= Orthodox pop =

Music genre

- Stylistic origins: Pop, rock, folk, jazz, cantoral music, nigun, klezmer
- Cultural origins: Early 1970s, United States and Israel
- Typical instruments: Vocals; synthesizer; bass; drums; keyboards; guitar; horn section; string section

Other topics
- Jewish rock, Jewish hip hop

Orthodox pop, sometimes called Hasidic pop, Hasidic rock, K-pop (Kosher pop), Haredi pop, and Ortho-pop, is a form of contemporary Jewish religious music popular among Orthodox Jews. It typically draws stylistically from contemporary genres like pop, rock, jazz, and dance music, while incorporating text from Jewish prayer, Torah, and Talmud as well as traditional Jewish songs and occasional original English lyrics with themes of faith and positivity. The genre was pioneered in the 1970s by artists like Mordechai Ben David and the Miami Boys Choir, who incorporated secular pop and dance influences into their music in contrast to the more traditional Jewish music of the time, and has had continued success in the modern era with singers like Yaakov Shwekey, Lipa Schmeltzer, Baruch Levine, and Benny Friedman.

Unlike other contemporary genres such as Jewish rock and Jewish hip hop, Orthodox pop is performed specifically by and for Orthodox Jews, reflects a distinctly Orthodox perspective, and abides by Orthodox halakha and cultural norms.

== History ==
=== Origins ===
Orthodox pop has its roots in the 1950s and early 1960s, when traditional Hasidic nigunim began to be recorded for the first time, such as Ben Zion Shenker's recordings of Modzitz melodies and cantor David Werdyger's recordings of Ger and other Hasidic melodies. Werdyger also founded the label Aderet Records in 1950, which was later inherited by his son Mendy Werdyger and which, along with its retail outlet Mostly Music, would become a major distributor of Orthodox music. Another influential figure around that time was Shlomo Carlebach, who pioneered the use of secular styles in Jewish religious music by combining Hasidic nigunim with a contemporary folk rock sound; artists like The Rabbis' Sons, Mark III, Ruach, Simchatone, and Abie Rotenberg's D'veykus followed in his style soon after, and many of Carlebach's compositions became standards and would be covered by countless Orthodox and non-Orthodox artists. Another development was the Hassidic Song Festival, begun in 1969 in Israel; winners included Nurit Hirsh's "Ose Shalom", Svika Pick's "Shema Yisrael", Carlebach's "Od Yishama" and "V'haer Enenu", and David Weinkranz's "Y'varech'cha", and these compositions were popularized in America via annual recordings and touring performances.

In the post-World War II generation of the 1960s, many Orthodox Jews were caught between the desire to maintain a traditional Orthodox way of life while also being "modern" and not living in the past, and from a musical standpoint this left a vacuum between the existing liturgical and cantorial music and more contemporary and secular styles. This led to the development of a new type of Jewish music that was not intended for the synagogue but instead for professional recording. According to historian Haym Soloveitchik:

Rock music sung with "kosher" lyrics was heard at the weddings of the most religious. There had been no "kosher" jazz or "kosher" swing, for music is evocative, and what was elicited by the contemporary beat was felt by the previous generation to be alien to a "Jewish rejoicing" (yiddishe simche). This was no longer the case. The body syncopated to the beat of rock, and the emotional receptivities that the contemporary rhythm engendered were now felt to be consonant with the spirit of "Jewish rejoicing." Indeed, "Hassidic" rock concerts, though decried, were not unheard of.

=== 1970s and 1980s ===
An early influence on Orthodox pop was the 1971 album Or Chodosh, the debut of an eponymous group created by Sh'or Yoshuv roommates Rabbi Shmuel Brazil, who would later create the group Regesh, and Yossi Toiv, later known as Country Yossi; the group performed at Brooklyn College with David Werdyger's son, the young Mordechai Ben David, opening for them. That same year, the group Clei Zemer, led by vocalist Noach Dear (later a State Supreme Court judge) and composer Abie Rotenberg, released the album Ki Lecho Tov Lehodos, whose title track was one of Rotenberg's first and most enduring compositions. Rotenberg would later make his solo debut with his D'veykus project in 1973.

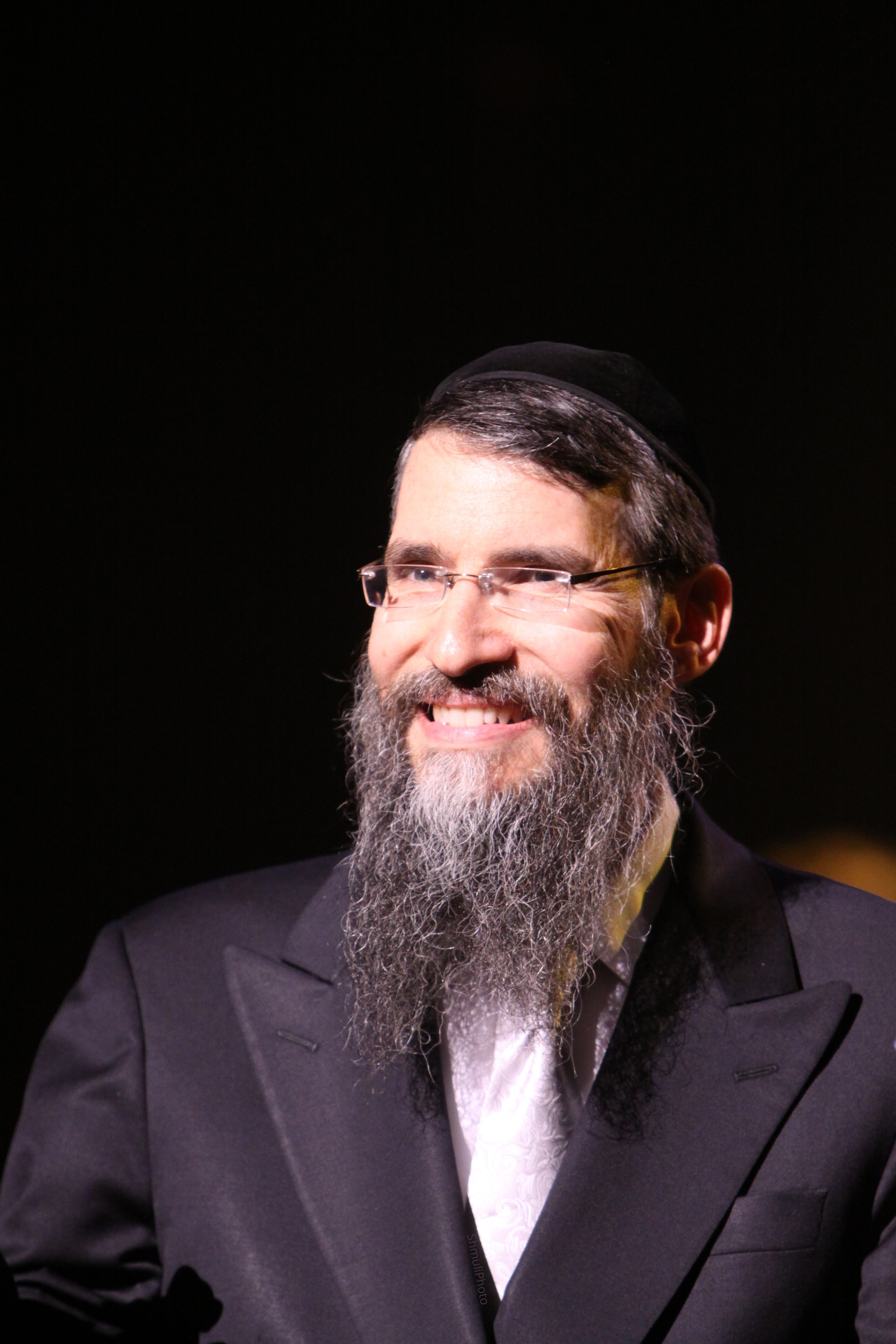
Artists like Mordechai Ben David, Avraham Fried, and Miami Boys Choir popularized Orthodox pop.

Perhaps the most substantial figure in the development of this new genre was David Werdyger's son Mordechai Werdyger, better known as Mordechai Ben David. His 1974 debut album Hineni broke conventions of Hasidic music by including professional arrangements with a full orchestra and English lyrics on several tracks, and his first three albums used a 1970s soft rock ballad style where the chorus is more energetic than the verses. In 1976, choir director Yerachmiel Begun formed the Miami Boys Choir, who inspired a trend of popular Orthodox boys choirs such as Yeshiva Boys Choir and several of whose members, including Yaakov Shwekey, Ari Goldwag, Shloime Dachs, and Mordechai Shapiro, would later become popular Orthodox singers in their own right. Another popular Orthodox singer, Avraham Fried, debuted in 1981 with his debut album No Jew Will Be Left Behind, with a title track written by composer Yossi Green about the coming of moshiach. His albums in the late '80s and early '90s featured more non-English text with music combining cantorial nusach, Hassidic niggun, and passages with a soothing melodic line, all tied together by an orchestral accompaniment. Meanwhile, in Israel, the decade saw the premiere of popular Orthodox singers like Dudu Fisher, Yehuda Glantz, Chaim-Dovid Saracik, and Dedi Graucher (Graucher had previously performed backing vocals on two of Mordechai Ben David's albums alongside Avraham Fried), as well as artists like Diaspora Yeshiva Band, Yosi Piamenta, Isaac Bitton, and Tofa'ah who helped introduce Jewish rock sounds to Orthodox music; Piamenta in particular being credited with introducing the electric guitar into Jewish music.

A considerable mainstream moment for the genre was a January 1988 concert at Lincoln Center's Avery Fisher Hall, a benefit for the Hebrew Academy for Special Children (HASC), featuring Mordechai Ben David, Avraham Fried, and Sephardi singer Yoel Sharabi; while similar performances had previously been held at Brooklyn College and Queens College, this was the first to take place in Manhattan. Similar benefit concerts would later take place at Carnegie Hall, Radio City Music Hall, the Paramount Theater at Madison Square Garden, Nassau Coliseum, Westbury Music Fair, and the Metropolitan Opera House, as well as concerts throughout North America, Europe, and Israel.

=== 1990s and 2000s ===
A younger generation of popular Orthodox singers arose throughout the 1990s and into the 2000s. The early 1990s saw the first solo albums of Mendy and Yeedle Werdyger, relatives of David Werdyger and Mordechai Ben David who had previously been featured on albums with them; British vocalist Shlomo Simcha, who collaborated with Abie Rotenberg for the Aish series of albums; and Shloime Dachs, who had performed as a child with Miami Boys Choir and on the 613 Torah Avenue series of children's albums.

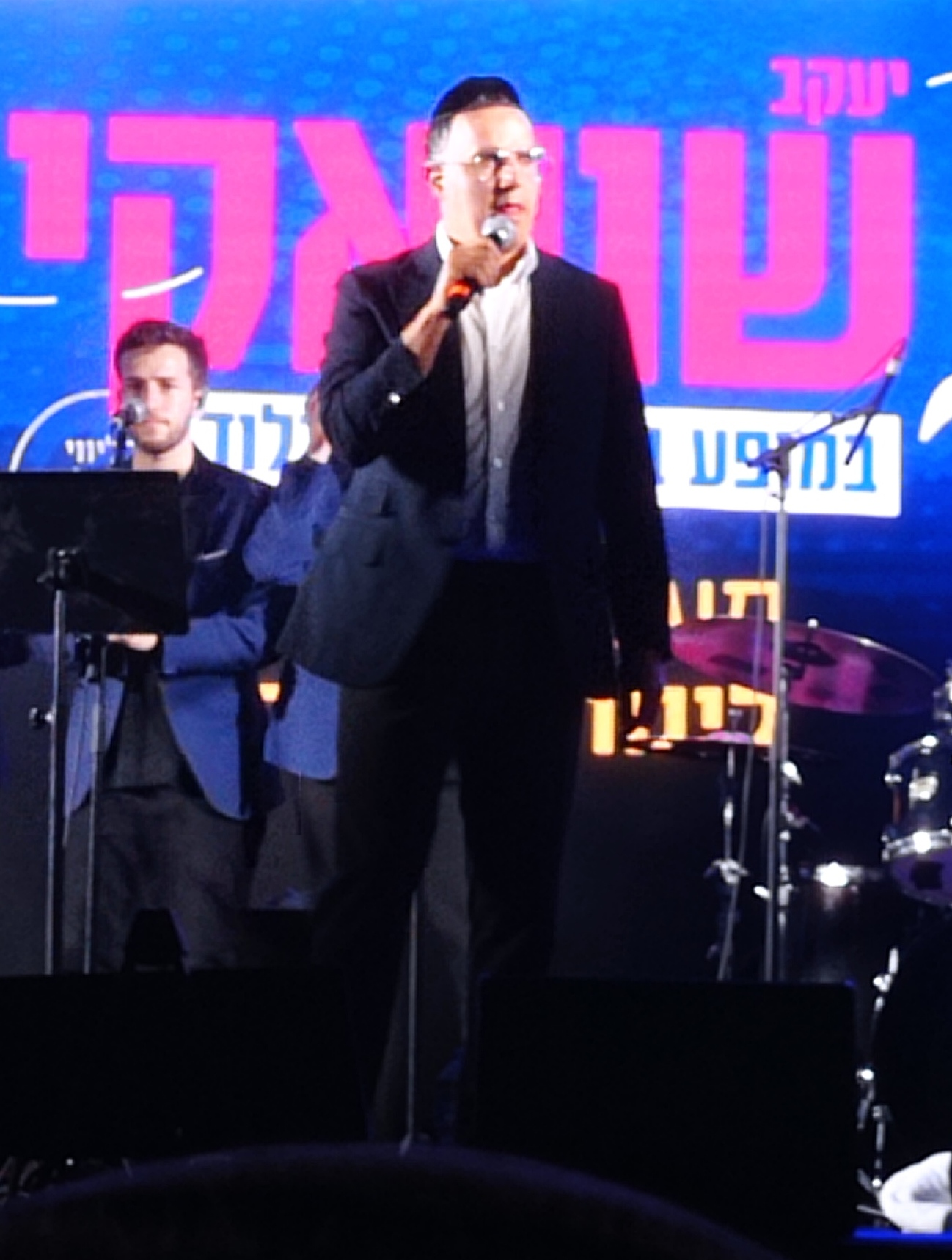
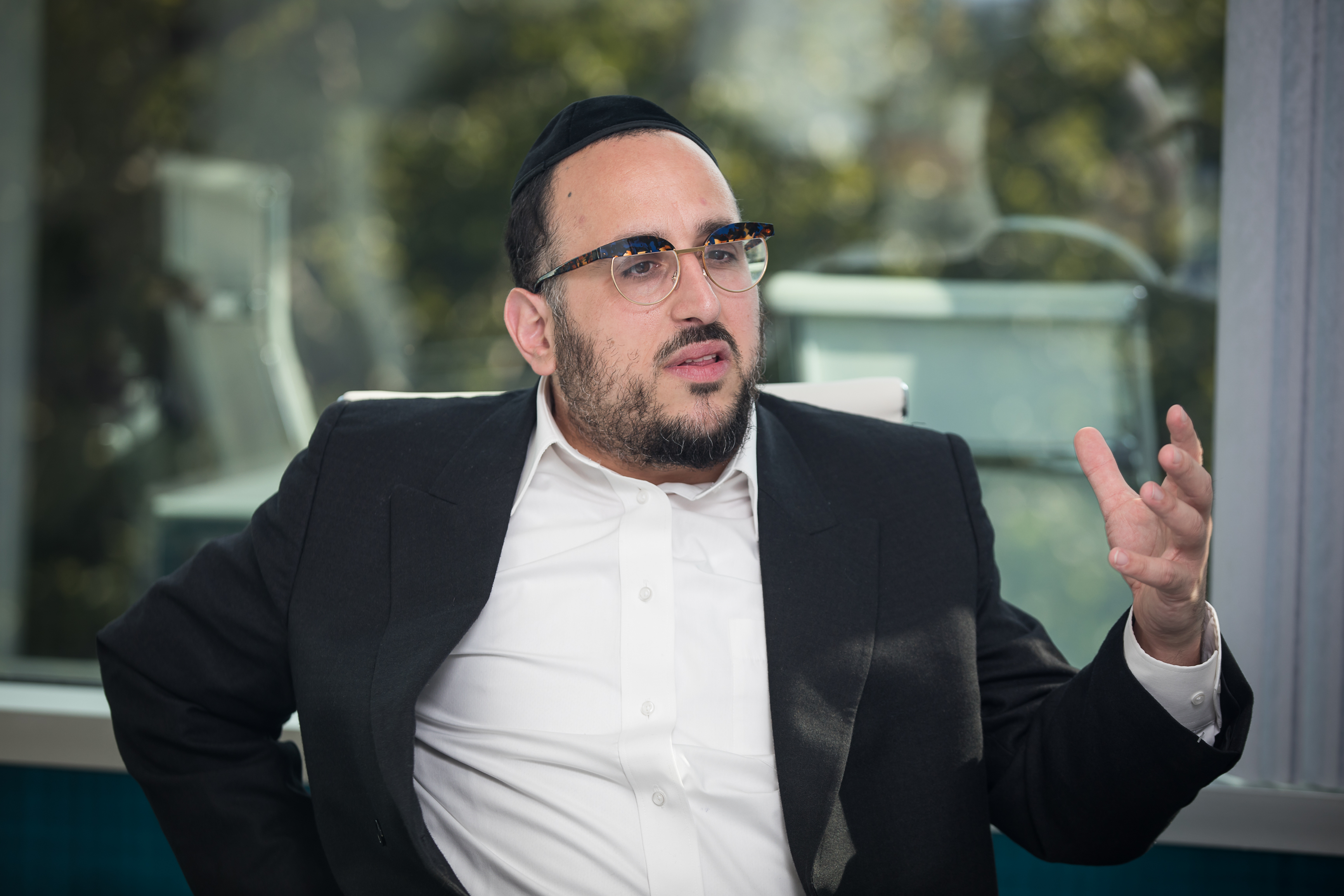
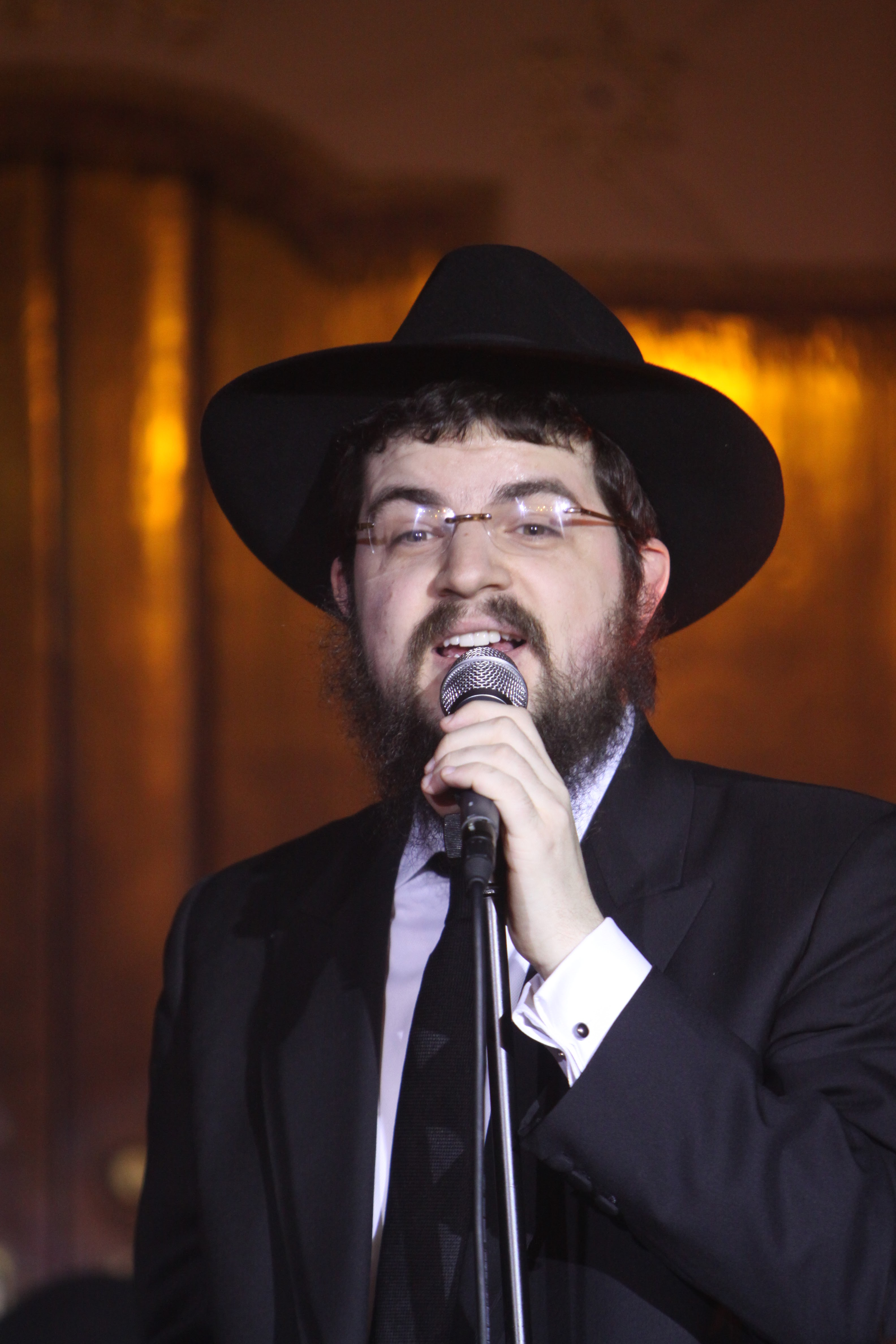
Shwekey, Lipa Schmeltzer, and Benny Friedman.

The latter part of the decade saw the arrival of Israeli artists Aharon Razel, Shuli Rand (who would gain fame starring in the 2004 film Ushpizin), and Gad Elbaz and, in America, Lipa Schmeltzer, who would garner the nickname "the Lady Gaga of Hasidic music" for his eccentric persona, becoming a hugely popular yet controversial figure in the community. Simultaneously, Eli Gerstner released his debut solo album; in addition to his own albums he would become a prominent producer, working with popular groups like The Chevra and Yeshiva Boys Choir and producing the annual HASC A Time for Music concerts from 2016 until 2022. Other popular names during this time included Sandy Shmuely, Mendy Wald, Yisroel Williger, Yehuda!, and Michoel Streicher.

One of the biggest breakouts in the 2000s was Yaakov Shwekey, a former Miami Boys Choir soloist who would become one of the most popular artists in the genre; his 2001 debut album, Shomati, produced his most popular single "Racheim", and his albums We Are A Miracle (2016) and Musica (2018) would later peak on the Billboard Top World Albums chart at No. 4 and No. 3 respectively. Other new artists in the decade included Yosef Karduner, Ari Goldwag, Yeshiva Boys Choir, Ohad Moskowitz, Udi Davidi, Shlomo Katz, Baruch Levine, Yonatan Razel, Shloime Gertner, Yehuda Green, Beri Weber, and Benny Friedman. Additionally, Hasidic reggae artist Matisyahu found mainstream crossover success with his 2005 single "King Without a Crown", which became a Top 40 hit and reached No. 28 on the Billboard Hot 100 (although Matisyahu would later leave Orthodoxy in 2011).

During this period there also debuted a number of female Orthodox singer-songwriters, who recorded and performed for female-only audiences to accommodate the prohibition of kol isha, following the lead of pre-existing Israeli band Tofa'ah. These included Ruthi Navon, Julia Blum, Dana Mase, Kineret, Miriam Sandler, Miriam Israeli (who also became an in-demand lyricist for Orthodox pop artists), Ashira, Rochel Miller, Susan Kates, and Shaindel Antelis.

=== 2010s ===
The 2010s saw a considerable amount of mainstream viral and commercial success for Orthodox pop artists. An early success in the decade was the Yeshiva University-founded a cappella group The Maccabeats, whose 2010 single "Candlelight" (a Hanukkah-themed cover of Mike Tompkins' version of Taio Cruz's hit "Dynamite") achieved viral status on YouTube and reached No. 1 on Billboard's Comedy Digital Tracks chart, leading to performances at the White House in 2011 and 2015, a spin-off group StandFour in 2012, and numerous further viral videos throughout the decade.

Also in 2010, cantor Yaakov Lemmer, who had seen his own viral success in 2007 with a recorded performance at Temple Beth El of Borough Park and described YouTube as "the springboard" to his career, released his debut studio album, Vimaleh Mshaloseinu, and would perform at the Boston Jewish Music Festival, multiple lightings of the National Menorah in Washington, D.C., at the Warsaw Ghetto alongside the Israel Philharmonic Orchestra to commemorate the uprising, and at the Jewish Culture Festival in Kraków and the Festival of Jewish Culture in Warsaw. Lemmer's brother, Shulem Lemmer, became a successful artist in his own right during this decade; after releasing a self-titled debut album in 2017, he became the first Hasidic-born artist to sign to a major label, the Universal Music Group classical imprint Decca Gold, who released his second album The Perfect Dream in 2019.

Elsewhere in the decade, the duo 8th Day, composed of two nephews of Avraham Fried, found viral success in 2011 with their single and music video "Ya'alili", while artists like Zusha, Shmueli Ungar, and Mordechai Shapiro all had albums place on Billboard's World Albums chart, and Israeli Orthodox artist Ishay Ribo had several albums certified gold and platinum. Other popular artists during the decade included Simcha Leiner, Shmuel Shapiro, Rogers Park, Meilech Kohn, Motty Steinmetz, Eitan Freilich, and Yoni Z.

== Characteristics ==
Musically, Orthodox pop incorporates a number of contemporary secular styles, such as pop, rock, easy listening, blues, country, soft rock, classical and techno, as well as traditional Hasidic nigunim. Songs will often make heavy use of orchestral instrumentation, synthesizers, and effects. Ethnomusicologist Abigail Wood, using the album Shabbos Classics as a sample of the genre, described it as "a soloist or men's choir [...] singing with high intensity throughout and fluently ornamenting the melodies [...] accompanied by synthesisers in a light pop style, complete with synthesised drums and numerous piano glissandi and key changes." Wood also noted, however, that the genre is less defined by musical features than by identification with and adherence to Orthodox Judaism.

Due to the prohibition of kol isha, the majority of Orthodox pop artists are male, with higher-range compositions being performed by children's choirs; there are, however, a number of female Orthodox singer-songwriters who perform for women-only audiences.

There is also a considerable presence of a cappella music in the genre, both as a replacement for periods like Sefirat Ha'omer, Tisha B'Av, and the Three Weeks wherein Orthodox Jews do not listen to music with instrumentation and to correlate with Orthodox vocal music traditions such as nigun, kumzits, and cantorial music.

== Criticism and controversy ==
=== Within the community ===
While Orthodox pop is broadly accepted in the Orthodox world, due to varying standards within the community and the incorporation of modern styles and aesthetics, it has faced periodic backlash, criticism, and even boycotts from Orthodox community leaders. Mark Kligman wrote in his 2001 essay "Contemporary Jewish Music in America" that such music "raises serious issues for the Orthodox community": "Should limits be placed on the use of 'non-Jewish' musical styles? Should the goal of the artist be to make money or to inspire people in their Jewish commitment? What can music do for those who are searching to connect to Judaism? Do rabbis have any responsibility to monitor this music? Might there not be dangers in allowing performers who are not rabbis to serve as charismatic role models for Orthodox youth?" Kligman also noted criticism within the community of Orthodox pop drifting from its roots and "[neglecting] true spirituality and [caring] only about making money", and how responses to this criticism from artists varied from Avraham Fried including more traditional works like the songs of Yom-Tov Ehrlich in his repertoire, to Lenny Solomon of Shlock Rock defending the use of secular styles as a means to better reach audiences with a spiritual message.

In a January 1997 article for The Jewish Observer entitled "Who Took the 'Jewish' Out of Jewish Music?", Rabbi Dovid Sears raised concerns that "rock-and-roll tunes, sutured together with Jewish lyrics, and promoted with a vengeance" might not be the best music the Jewish tradition has to offer; this was echoed in a subsequent Observer article in April that same year by David Altschuler, who described the 1995 Chabad telethon in Los Angeles featuring "a rocking Chassid shoving a microphone down his throat. Several chubby men in yeshiva garb nearby had sweat rolling down their peyos [side curls], their hands and hips gyrating in all-too-perfect synchronization."

In a 2006 joint interview with Mishpacha, Mordechai Ben David and Avraham Fried defended their work while criticizing newer artists in the scene, with Fried saying "We had the intention of touching people's hearts and bringing them closer to Hashem [God]. Today, anyone who can count to three can put out a disc" and MBD adding "I can't take what the new generation is doing. I can't even listen to it. It has no connection to chassidus [Hasidism]".

In a particularly infamous example, the Bnei Brak-based Haredi group Committee for Jewish Music, led by Rabbi Ephraim Luft, published in 2008 their "Rules for Playing Kosher Music", which condemned not only the use of secular styles in Jewish music but also modern instruments like saxophone and electric guitar as well as disco-style beats, and forbid the songs of "chareidi rock idols" from being played at Jewish events. Luft and the committee, in connection with groups like the Guardians of Sanctity and Education, sought to pre-approve all Haredi music and issued community-wide bans against many concerts, particularly targeting artists like Avraham Fried, Yaakov Shwekey, Mordechai Ben David, and Lipa Schmeltzer. Ben David allegedly called Luft a "sick individual" and other musicians in the scene privately told the press that they doubted the efficacy of his methods. Luft was also accused of racism due to his particular condemnation of black music styles like hip hop and reggae as "primitive", and one blogger noted that he had previously quoted the KKK publication The Southerner and approvingly cited the concept of white citizens' councils. Luft later released his own album, Hamavdil, in 2010, to provide an example of what he considered "proper music".

Writing in 2011 for The Journal of Halacha and Contemporary Society, in an article entitled "Secular Music", Ezriel Gelbfish, surveying the relevant rabbinic literature on Jewish appropriation of secular music, found a variety of authoritative opinions and proposed a nuanced, case-by-case approach.

Speaking about Haredi pop in 2015, Ben Zion Shenker said "What's happening now is that a lot of the young yeshiva boys are being exposed to this type of music [pop music], and they are going along with it. But the Rosh yeshivas are seeing a trend which is not a very good trend. Because with this type of music, you can go on the fringe, you know. If you become too inspired by it. It's not a kosher type of [outlet]."

In a 2016 interview, producer Eli Gerstner revealed that his first Chevra album in 2001 had been banned in many Jewish schools and that he had received both hate mail and in-person criticism for the album's "non-Jewish" mainstream pop sound. In response, Gerstner argued that his music was at its core niggunim and that the objectionable modern elements were merely "dressing" and a matter of taste.

==== Shwekey and Fried concert controversy ====
In August 2007, Shwekey and Avraham Fried were slated to headline a major concert in Jerusalem at Teddy Stadium. The event was produced by Moshe Ben-Zimra and billed as a commemoration of the 40th anniversary of the reunification of Jerusalem. Leading Haredi rabbis, including Rabbi Yosef Shalom Elyashiv, the Gerrer Rebbe, the Belzer Rebbe, Rabbi Aharon Leib Shteinman, Rabbi Shmuel Wosner, and Rabbi Chaim Pinchas Scheinberg signed a ban which appeared in the Haredi press forbidding participation or attendance of the event or similar events. Their ban stated that concerts should not be performed in front of both men and women, regardless if there was separate seating.

Shwekey issued a response that he had already posed the question to Rabbi Ovadia Yosef when an earlier concert featuring him, along with Mordechai Ben David, was also banned. Rabbi Yosef responded that there is absolutely no prohibition as long as the event had completely separate seating. Neither Shwekey nor Fried pulled out of the concert.

==== "The Big Event" controversy ====
In February 2008, a large amount of publicity was generated for a concert at Madison Square Garden's WaMu Theater in New York City featuring Lipa Schmeltzer and Shloime Gertner, under the playbill "The Big Event". On 20 February, a full-page notice was printed in the Hamodia, the most prominent Haredi newspaper, stating that it was "a serious prohibition to attend or perform" at the concert, which would lead to "ribaldry and lightheadedness", and added that it was "forbidden to hire these singers to sing at any party, celebration or charity event".

Following speculation over whether Schmeltzer would cancel the concert due to the ban, on 26 February it was confirmed that he was canceling his performance. He was quoted by The New York Times as saying, "I have a career, I have a wife and kids to support, I have a mortgage to pay, I have to get out of the fire". At the same time, Schmeltzer pulled out of a concert scheduled for later that month in London with other singers.

In an interview in June 2008, Schmeltzer stated: "I made a Kiddush Hashem and I don't regret it. But if I had known the truth about how things were presented to the gedolei hatorah, I would not have cancelled the concert." Schmeltzer said that "Many gedolei hatorah have told me that people came to them with false information regarding my concert: they said it would have mixed dancing or mixed seating." In 2009, one of the most prestigious rabbis who signed the document, Rabbi Shmuel Kamenetsky, told The Jewish Star that he had no problem with Schmeltzer: "As far as I know he is an ehrliche Yid [a truly devout Jew]."

Three months after the controversy, Schmeltzer released his next album, titled A Poshiter Yid (A Simple Jew), with a cover image and songs that portrayed him as a tradition-minded, Torah-observant Jew instead of the rock idol portrayed by the ban. Since that release, Schmeltzer's concert and recording schedules have increased.

Shortly after the cancellation of "The Big Event", promoters began planning another concert with the scaled-down name "The Event", which went off without controversy before a sell-out crowd at Madison Square Garden's WaMu Theater on March 1, 2009. Later the same year, Aderet Records released a double CD and DVD of "The Event".

=== Outside the community ===
Many non-Orthodox and ex-Orthodox individuals have criticized Orthodox pop as being of mediocre or substandard musical quality. Abigail Wood noted that while Orthodox pop recordings are "often well produced" and "the use of synthesisers and beats derived from pop music reflects the influence of wider American music culture, to an outsider to the Hasidic world, they sound kitschy at best, far from the historicist or contemporary musical aesthetics which have largely been adopted by world music artists including klezmer revivalists. As listening material, therefore, they are largely unappealing to those outside the strictly Orthodox community".

In a 1994 essay entitled "Sacred Music in a Secular Age", composer and teacher Samuel Adler sharply criticized the "pseudo-Hasidic or Israeli tunes that have become the trademark of the Jewish commercial sacred music norm".

The Modern Orthodox rock band Blue Fringe, on their signature 2003 song "Flippin' Out", a satirical portrayal of a young man becoming ultra-Orthodox after a year in Israel, features the in-character lyrics: "No more English music 'cause she might be pretty / Now it's only Carlebach and Miami Boys".

Writing about 8th Day for The Forward in 2007, music journalist Mordechai Shinefield distinguished them from "[collections] of revved-up wedding songs" common in the field, noting that "other ultra-Orthodox musicians tend to either be trapped in a liturgical-inspired genre (such as well-known Hasidic musician Avraham Fried, who happens to be the Marcus brothers’ uncle) or sacrifice the motifs of Hasidic culture for mass appeal (Matisyahu)." In another Forward article in 2010, Ezra Glinter described the Orthodox pop industry as producing "the frum equivalent of Justin Timberlake, or over-produced boys choirs backed up by obnoxious electronics and phony string arrangements."

Klezmer trumpeter and composer Frank London was critical of contemporary Hasidic music in 2014, calling it "horrible" and the instrumental accompaniment "abysmal" and critiquing its emulation of mainstream styles like disco: "The [modern Hasidic] accompaniments don't feel Jewish [....] Because it's interesting: the Hasids want their accompaniment to feel hip and modern. We [London and collaborator Lorin Sklamberg] live in the hip, modern world. We don't have any need to do that, to prove it to anyone, we're not trying to do that. So we can go another way." London's band The Klezmatics had previously featured a track on their 2003 album Rise Up! entitled "Tepel", which briefly features the band member's children singing in an imitation of Hasidic boys' choirs.

Writing for Hevria in 2016, Punk Jews filmmaker Saul Sudin described Orthodox Jewish music and video productions as "embarrassingly amateur" and spoke of "the wailing guitars, disco horns and crappy synthesizers you find at most Jewish parties these days."

In Israel, Hasidic singer Motty Steinmetz faced controversy in the summer of 2019 for performing for a gender-segregated audience. Steinmetz was scheduled to perform to a gender-segregated audience in Afula. This was challenged in the local courts with a judge recommending that the audience be split three ways with the addition of a mixed gender area. However, this ruling was challenged in the high court by a woman's activists’ group. The high court ruled that the segregation was illegal, but the judgment was only passed as the concert was finishing. Steinmetz said that he found the controversy "infuriating" and that he had received praise from Haredi politicians Aryeh Deri and Moshe Gafni. Subsequently, a male-only Steinmetz concert in Haifa was shut down by judges.

== Notable artists ==
Established	Artist	Notes
1959	Shlomo Carlebach	
1960	Yom Tov Ehrlich	
1967	Baruch Chait	
1971	Abie Rotenberg	
1973	Mordechai Ben David	
1975	Jerusalem Boys Choir	
1977	Miami Boys Choir	
1980	Moshe Yess	
1981	Avraham Fried	
1982	Isaac Bitton	
1985	Dudu Fisher	
1985	Yehuda Glantz	
1985	Dedi Graucher	
1986	Chaim-Dovid Saracik	
1988	Ruthi Navon	
1990	Julia Blum	
1990	Mendy Werdyger	
1991	Yehuda! (Yehuda Cik)	
1993	Yeedle Werdyger	
1993	Shlomo Simcha	
1994	Dana Mase	
1996	Shloime Dachs	
1998	Kineret	
1998	Adi Ran	
1999	Eli Gerstner	
1999	Miriam Israeli	
1999	Lipa Schmeltzer	
1999	Aharon Razel	
1999	Gad Elbaz	
2000	Yosef Karduner	
2001	Yaakov Shwekey	
2001	The Chevra	
2002	Yossi Green	
2003	Ari Goldwag	
2003	Yeshiva Boys Choir	
2003	Ohad Moskowitz	
2004	Udi Davidi	
2004	Matisyahu	
2006	Shlomo Katz	
2006	Baruch Levine	
2007	Yonatan Razel	
2007	Shloime Gertner	
2007	Yehuda Green	
2007	Aryeh Kunstler	
2007	Beri Weber	
2008	Miriam Sandler	
2008	Shaindel Antelis	
2008	Shuli Rand	
2009	Benny Friedman	
2010	The Maccabeats	
2010	Yaakov Lemmer	
2011	Simcha Leiner	
2011	8th Day	
2011	Shmuel Shapiro	
2012	StandFour	
2014	Zusha	
2014	Ishay Ribo	
2014	Rogers Park	
2015	Shulem Lemmer	
2015	Meilech Kohn	
2015	Motty Steinmetz	
2016	Mordechai Shapiro	
2016	Shmueli Ungar	
2016	Eitan Freilich	
2018	Yoni Z	
