= Shloime Gertner =

- Born: 1980 (age 45–46)
- Origin: London, England
- Genres: Contemporary Jewish religious music
- Occupation: Singer
- Years active: 2007–present
- Website: https://gertnermusic.com/en/

Shloime Gertner (Hebrew: שלמה גרטנר) is a British Hasidic Jewish singer from London, England. He achieved international celebrity status with his first album, Nissim (Miracles) in 2007. He often performs at Jewish weddings, and in concert and benefit performances with other top-billed Jewish singers.

== Family ==
Gertner was born to a Hasidic Jewish family in the Hendon neighbourhood of London. He is married with six children. His second daughter, Malka, is developmentally disabled; Gertner dedicated the song "Kodesh" ("Holy") on his debut album to her.

== Career ==
Gertner often sings at Jewish weddings and is known for his "sentimental and religious wedding songs", according to The Telegraph, which says he has been called "the Hasidic Robbie Williams". Gertner has appeared in concert with many popular Jewish performers, including Mordechai Ben David, Avraham Fried, Yehuda Green, Yaakov Shwekey, Baruch Levine, and Miami Boys Choir. He was featured in the HASC 24 and 25 concerts, was one of 30 top singers featured on the "Unity for Justice" song produced to benefit the legal defence of Sholom Rubashkin, and often sings at charitable events, including a 2014 appreciation breakfast at which he sang for the Mayor of London, Boris Johnson.

In 2007 Gertner released his first solo album, Nissim, featuring songs composed by Yossi Green, Pinky Weber, Eli Laufer, and other top Jewish composers.

=== "The Big Event" controversy ===
In February 2008, a large amount of publicity was generated for a concert of 9 March at Madison Square Garden's WaMu Theater in New York City featuring Lipa Schmeltzer and Gertner, under the playbill "The Big Event". On 20 February, a full-page notice of a rabbinical ban was printed in the Hamodia newspaper. The notice stated that it was "a serious prohibition to attend or perform" at the concert which would lead to "ribaldry and lightheadedness" and added that it was "forbidden to hire these singers to sing at any party, celebration or charity event". Gertner and Schmeltzer backed out of the concert within days, after 3,000 tickets had been sold.

Shortly after the cancellation of "The Big Event", promoters began planning another concert with the scaled-down name "The Event", which went off without controversy before a sell-out crowd at Madison Square Garden's WaMu Theater on 1 March 2009. Later the same year, Aderet Records released a double CD and DVD of "The Event".

=== Other albums ===
Gertner's second solo album, Say Asay, was released in 2010. This was followed by two more solo albums, Vehiskin (2012) and Imagine (2013). The latter album features songs in English, Hebrew, and Yiddish. In 2014 Gertner collaborated with Dudi Kalish on the album Dovid V'Shloime (Dovid and Shloime), an all-Yiddish production.

== Other activities ==
Gertner is the co-founder of Shmeichel (Yiddish for "Smile"), a "cheer-up squad" consisting of Gertner and his friends who visit and entertain sick adults and children in the London area.

== Albums ==
- Nissim (2007)
- Say Asay (2010)
- Vehiskin (2012)
- Imagine (2013)
- Dovid V'Shloime (2014)
- Mincha (2016)
- Serenity (2018)
- Yehaleli (2019)
- Viznitz Inderhiem (2022)
- Adei Ad (2026)

=== Singles ===
- "Yaaleh Veyovoi" (2014)

=== Guest appearances ===
- HASC 24 – A Time for Duets (2011)
- Kumtantz (2014)
- HASC 25 (2012)
