= Kineret (singer) =

American singer

Kineret Sarah Cohen כנרת שרה כהן
- Born: 1970 (age 55–56); Israel
- Origin: Brooklyn, New York, USA
- Genres: Contemporary Jewish religious music
- Occupations: Singer, songwriter, producer, lecturer
- Instrument: Vocals
- Years active: 1998–present
- Label: Aderet

Kineret Sarah Cohen (Hebrew: כנרת שרה כהן; born 1970) is an Israeli-American Orthodox Jewish singer, songwriter, producer, rebbetzin, and lecturer. She has released nine musical albums since 1998 and has been noted as an established performer of Jewish music for women only alongside artists like Ruthi Navon and Julia Blum. She is also known for her Torah lectures, motivational speeches, and weekly newsletters.

== Biography ==
=== Early life ===
Kineret was born in Israel. Her parents, both professional musicians, met in Italy and played in a band together. Due to their constant touring, she lived primarily with her maternal grandmother, Sarah, a religious Jew of Moroccan and Iraqi heritage who traced her lineage to the famous Sephardic rabbi Ben Ish Hai. While Kineret's mother was strictly secular, her grandmother exposed her to practices such as Shabbat and kashrut.

When she was six, she and her parents moved to Queens, New York. She attended P.S. 13, where she performed in school productions and was in the school band. She applied to Louis Armstrong Middle School but was disqualified after she was caught skipping class, and instead attended Yeshiva Academy of South Queens under Rabbi Zalman Deutscher. She also spent a summer at Camp Sternberg; both locations deepened her commitment to Judaism. When her parents moved again to California, she remained in New York, boarding with the family of noted posek Rabbi Noach Isaac Oelbaum and attending Shevach High School.

=== Career ===
She was encouraged by Rabbi Nuta Waidenbaum of Milk and Honey Productions to make a career in Jewish music and gave her first women-only performance during a Chanukkah production at Brooklyn College when she was 18. She released her first album, The Inspiration, in 1998, and has since released six more albums and two concert DVDS. Her third album, How Come, How Long?, was dedicated to victims of the September 11 attacks and includes covers of songs by Yehuda!, Mendy Wald, and Shloime Dachs. Her most recent album is Reach Out released in 2007. In the summer of 2011, she performed at a Shas-sponsored women's conference in Tel Aviv. She has received vocal training from Dr. William Riley, coach of Luciano Pavarotti and Celine Dion.

In addition to her music career, Kineret is a motivational speaker and life coach. She is the founder of the outreach organization Ohel Sara, which provides Jewish learning opportunities to women and girls new to Judaism. The organization is named after Kineret's grandmother and was encouraged early on by Rebbetzin Rachel Baraness and the late Rav Ovadia Yosef.

== Discography ==
=== Albums ===
- The Inspiration (1998)
- One Voice (2000)
- How Come, How Long? (2001)
- In Motion: The Dance Album (2002)
- Come Home: Kum Aheim (2003)
- The English Album (2004)
- Reach Out (2007)

=== Concert DVDS ===
- Kineret in Concert – Brooklyn College (2008)
- Kineret in Concert 2: In Celebration of Chanukah (2009)
