= Baruch Levine =

American singer (born 1977)

Rabbi Baruch Levine
- Born: December 28, 1977 (age 48); Toronto, Canada
- Genres: Orthodox pop
- Occupation: Yeshiva ketana rebbi (Jewish studies teacher)
- Years active: 2006–present
- Website: http://www.baruchlevine.com/

Baruch Levine (born December 28, 1977) is an American Orthodox Jewish composer and singer. His tunes have gained wide popularity at Shabbat tables and kumzits gatherings. One of his most successful compositions is "Vezakeini" (Give Us Merit), derived from the ancient prayer recited at Shabbat candle lighting.

== Early life and education ==
Baruch Levine was born and raised in Toronto, Canada. He attended Eitz Chaim Day School, where his father, Rabbi Michoel Levine, is currently the fifth-grade rebbi (Jewish studies teacher). He also studied at the Ner Yisroel in Toronto, and Toras Moshe and Mir Yeshivas in Jerusalem.

After Levine got married, he moved to Waterbury, Connecticut. In 2005, he joined the staff of the Yeshiva Ketana of Waterbury, Connecticut as a fifth-grade rebbi.

Levine has four children.

== Music career ==
Levine first began singing at the age of 8 in his school choir. Soon after he began studying keyboard, and performed at school and in summer camp during his youth. He tried out for a spot on the album The Marvelous Midos Machine and was not accepted, but he did sing on a Miriam Israeli album. He did, however, perform on The Golden Crown - another one of Abie Rotenberg's musical story albums for children. He was "Yehuda" - one of the children listening to the Zaidy tell the story of the Golden Crown - as well as a soloist on the song Torah Tzivo Lonu Moshe.

After his marriage, Levine began writing songs which he sold to other performers. One of his demos came to the attention of several music producers, who asked Levine why he wasn't performing his own songs. This led to the production of Levine's first album, Vezakeini, in 2006. The title song, which took him ten minutes to write, has become a relative classic in the Orthodox Jewish world. Like many of Levine's hits, it is a heartfelt tune with a rising crescendo. On his second album, Chasan Hatorah, Levine performed a medley of his compositions that other performers had made famous.

For Levine's 2009 album, Touched by a Niggun, Rabbi Yechiel Spero, author of the Touched by a Story series of books, wrote the English lyrics to the songs, which are based on his stories.

In 2010 Levine wrote two new songs and performed live in concert with Yaakov Shwekey; the resulting album, Live in Caesarea II – 5770, was later released on CD and DVD. In 2011, he sang on Abie Rotenberg's Marvelous Middos Machine Episode 4.

Levine was a guest performer at the 12th Siyum HaShas on August 1, 2012, at MetLife Stadium, which was attended by nearly 100,000 Jews. He performed again at the next Siyum HaShas, held on January 1, 2020 in MetLife Stadium, together with other famous singers in the Jewish music realm. He also performs at charity benefits. On November 27, 2011 he performed together with Shwekey in a concert benefiting Hatzolah in London. He was featured at the HASC 27 "A Time for Music" concert on January 12, 2013. On Lag B'omer 2020, he was one of many singers to perform in the "Hatzalah-thon" fundraiser, created to raise money for Hatzalah and in honor of the completion of the "Miracle Sefer Torah," which was written as a merit for those sick with COVID-19 which was rampant at that time. Another endeavor undertaken during COVID-19 was the production of The Place Where They Belong, which Levine made together with Abie Rotenberg, about Jews not being able to pray at the synagogue due to the necessary quarantine and much it is missed.

== Discography ==
=== Albums ===
- Vezakeini (2006)
- Chasan Hatorah (2008)
- Touched by a Niggun (2009)
- Hashkifah (2011)
- Modim Anachnu Lach (2013)
- Project Relax with Simcha Leiner (2015)
- Bonim Atem (2015)
- Project Relax Again with Simcha Leiner (2017)
- Peduscha (2018)
- Off the Record (2020)
- Off the Record 2 (2021)
- Lev Chodosh (2023)
- Kumzitz Alive (2024)
- Kumzitz Alive - Elul (2024)
- Off the Record 3 - The Pirchei Years (2024)
