= Ohad Moskowitz =

Israeli musical artist

Ohad Moskowitz אוהד מושקוביץ
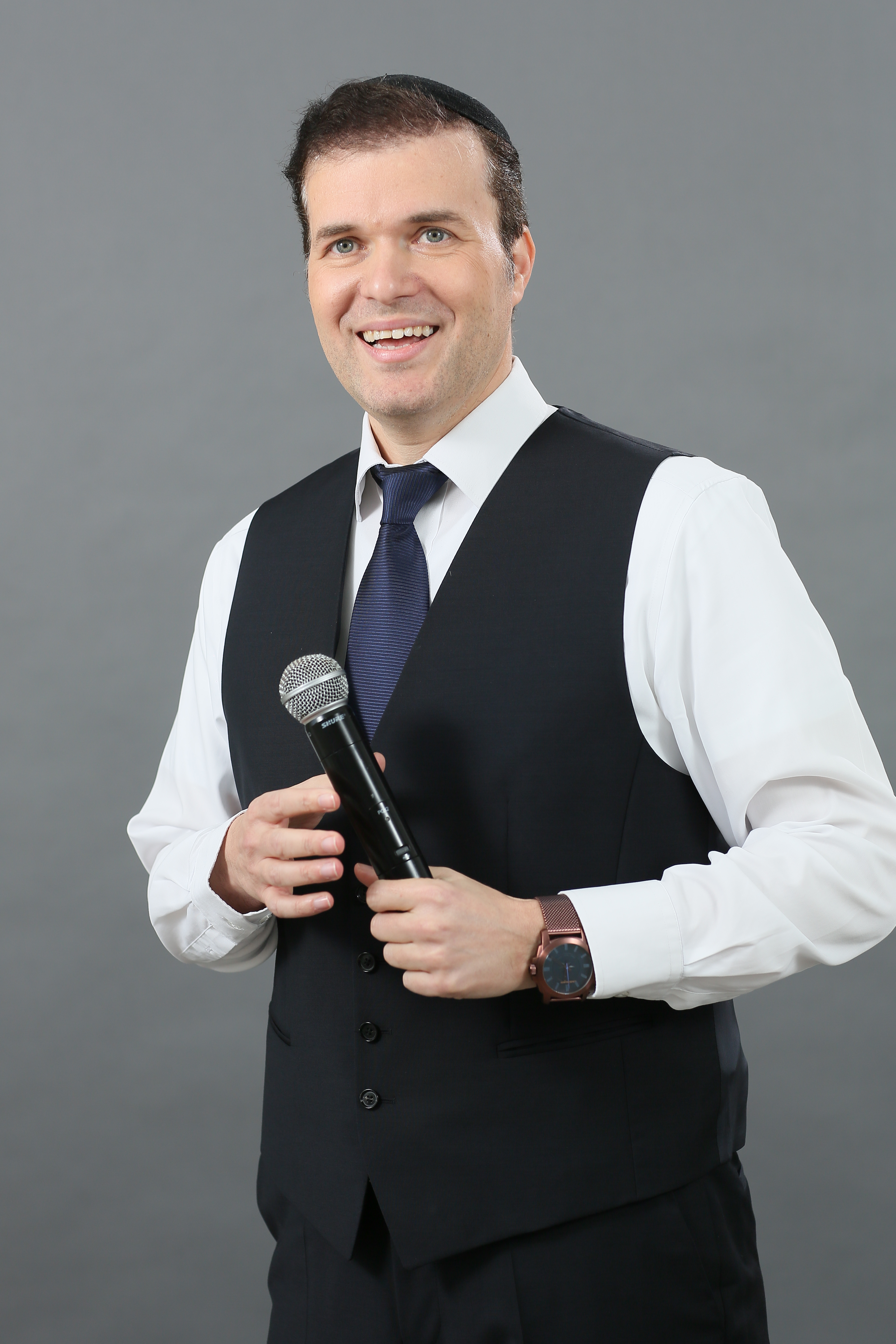

Background information
- Born: September 2, 1974 (age 52); Belgium
- Genres: Contemporary Jewish religious music
- Website: http://www.ohadm.com/

Ohad Moskowitz (Hebrew: אוהד מושקוביץ; born September 2, 1974), known professionally as Ohad, is a Belgian-born Israeli Orthodox Jewish vocalist who is one of the superstars of the contemporary Jewish religious music scene. He rose to international stardom in 2003 with his first solo album, Vearastich, produced by Yossi Green.

== Music career ==
Ohad began his career singing back-up vocals for Orthodox Jewish stars such as Mordechai Ben David and Dedi Graucher. His first American performance took place in 2003 at Yossi Green's Jewish hospice benefit concert at the Lincoln Center. Green was so impressed with the audience's reaction to Ohad's singing that he offered to produce Ohad's first album. Green wrote several songs for the album, including the title track, "Vearastich" (I Will Betroth You).

Ohad's debut album catapulted him to fame. He was named Singer of the Year at the Hasidic Music "People of the Year" ceremony in Israel in 2004. He was a featured singer at the HASC 18 "A Time for Music" in 2005. He was also a featured vocalist at HASC 20 (2007); HASC 21 (2007) (where he performed as one of the "Four Tenors" alongside Avraham Fried, Cantor Yitzchak Meir Helfgot, and Dudu Fisher); HASC 24 (2010) (where he sang a duet with Hasidic singer and hazzan Yehuda Green); HASC 25 (2011); and HASC 27 (2013). Ohad also performs at concerts benefiting Ohel and other Jewish charity organizations.

In 2008 Ohad performed a new Yossi Green song dedicated to Chabad shluchim around the world in the wake of the 2008 Mumbai attacks, which targeted the Chabad house there. He was one of over 30 Orthodox Jewish superstars appearing on the 2010 Unity for Justice album to benefit the legal defense of Sholom Rubashkin.

Ohad sings at Jewish weddings and Chol HaMoed events with choirs such as the Gershon Freishtat Orchestra, the Yedidim Choir, the KMR Boys Choir, and the Miami Boys Choir, His 2009 hit, Bo'i Kala, set to the words of the traditional song accompanying the bride to the chuppah, is a remake of Leonard Cohen's "Hallelujah".

== Vocal style ==
Ohad has an exceptionally wide vocal range and high vocal register, with the capacity to hold high notes.

== Personal life ==
Ohad was born in Belgium. He began singing at an early age. He attended the Talmudic college Yeshivat Kerem B'Yavneh. After his marriage, he immigrated to Israel. He resides in Modi'in with his wife and children.

In 2011 he recorded a duet for his song "Birkat HaBanim" (Bless the Children) with his firstborn son Eyal, then aged 13. While the boy shows talent, Ohad prefers that he perform in the school choir and in the studio with him, but not on stage.

== Discography ==
- Oh! Ohad: Vearastich (2003)
- Ohad Live in New York (2006)
- Oh! Ohad II (2008)
- My Music (2009)
- Ohad III (2011)
- Segula (2015)
- Beshaah Tova (2018)
