= Ari Goldwag =

- Born: April 8, 1979 (age 47); West Hempstead, New York, US
- Genre: Contemporary Jewish religious music
- Years active: 1988–present
- Website: arigoldwag.com

Ari Goldwag (born April 8, 1979) is an American Orthodox Jewish singer, songwriter, composer, and producer of contemporary Jewish religious music, as well as an author and teacher living in Ramat Beit Shemesh, Israel. He was a soloist for the Miami Boys Choir at age 10 and starred on five albums and three videos before his voice changed at age 14. He launched a music career after his marriage and move to Israel. He has released nine solo albums, and composes songs and produces albums for other artists.

== Early life, education, and family ==
Goldwag was born on April 8, 1979 in West Hempstead, where he also grew up. His father, Murray Goldwag, is a retired math teacher and owner of Murray's Kosher Socks in South Fallsburg. His mother Meryl was also a public school teacher.

Goldwag attended the Hebrew Academy of Nassau County for elementary school and the Yeshiva of Far Rockaway for high school. He came to Israel in 2000 and studied at the Mir yeshiva in Jerusalem. He met and married Talia, a native of Seattle, Washington, in 2001. The couple settled first in Jerusalem and later in Ramat Beit Shemesh. They have two sons and five daughters.

== Music career ==
=== Child singer ===
Goldwag enjoyed singing during his childhood and was a member of Seymour Silbermintz's choir in his elementary school years. After his ninth birthday, his mother took him to audition for the Miami Boys Choir; she had to convince him to go up on stage when he panicked at the sight of 200 other boys at the tryout. He passed the audition and became a member of the choir from 1988 to 1994. At age 10 he became a soloist, appearing as a lead vocalist on five Miami albums and three music videos. His soloist career ended at age 14 when his voice changed.

=== Singer, songwriter, composer, producer ===
Goldwag took voice lessons for five years with Cantor Hersh Einhorn, who also coached Avraham Fried. He produced his first solo album, Lishuascha Kivinu (For Your Salvation We Do Long) in 2003. In addition to composing 10 of the 11 tracks on the album, he mixed, engineered and produced the album himself, together with Jeff Horvitch. As of 2022, he has released eight solo albums. His son, Moshe Dov Goldwag, also performs on his albums and videos.

Goldwag appears in music videos to promote his albums, including "Hashem Loves You" and "Am Echad" (One Nation). For the latter video, he played five different denominations of Jews – Haredi, Hasidic, Breslov, Religious Zionist, and secular. He performed the song "Am Echad" at HASC 27 in 2014.

Goldwag has made guest appearances on albums by Mendy Wald and Shloime Dachs, Shalsheles, David Lowy, and Moshe David Weissman, and performed on the compilation albums A Capella Treasury: Yom Tov, Sameach at the Wheel, and A Kumsitz in the Rain. He also writes songs for other artists, including the hit song "Yesh Tikvah" (There Is Hope) (2012) and "Ivri Anochi" (Proud Jew) (2017), both of which were composed by Goldwag, and lyrics co-written with Miriam Israeli for singer Benny Friedman. Additionally, he produces albums for other artists, including Sheves Achim 1 & 2, and Sheves Chaverim 1 & 2, which feature child vocalists performing Goldwag's compositions and musical arrangements. Goldwag plays piano and guitar.

In 2007 he founded the Ari Goldwag Orchestra, which performs at weddings, bar mitzvahs, organizational fundraisers, and concerts. He occasionally performs in concert in the United States. He is the chazzan for Rosh Hashana and Yom Kippur at a Seattle-area synagogue.

=== Musical style ===
Goldwag characterizes his musical style as "yeshivishe pop", in contrast to "Hasidic pop". He composes songs in both English and Hebrew. While his Hebrew-language melodies are based on Jewish prayers and psalms, his English-language compositions are original. On his fifth solo album, The English Album, all the tracks are in English.

== Other activities ==
Goldwag is a prolific author and lecturer on Torah topics. He has recorded hundreds of talks on the weekly Torah portion and on the topic of Bitachon (Faith in God). Since 2007 he has delivered Torah shiurim on mussar and hashkafah on a podcast. He is also the author of a book on personal growth, titled Perfectly Imperfect: Breaking out of the ordinary and striving for greatness (Mosaica - Distributed by Feldheim).

== Discography ==
=== Solo albums ===
- Lishuascha Kivinu (For Your Salvation We Do Long) (2003)
- Simcha B'libi (The Joy in My Heart) (2004)
- Pure Soul: Flippin' In (2006)
- Am Echad (One Nation) (2013)
- The English Album (2014)
- Lo Nafsik Lirkod - Never Stop Dancing (2018)
- Yesh Li Hakol (I Have Everything) (2020)
- It's Geshmak to be a Yid! (It's Awesome to be a Jew) (2022)
- Ari Goldwag Hit Collection (2023)
- B'ezrat Hashem Nenatseach (With G-d's Help we will be Victorious) (2024)

=== A Cappella albums ===
- A Cappella Soul (2012)
- A Cappella Soul 2 (2014)
- A Cappella Soul 3 (2016)
- A Cappella Soul 4 (2017)
- A Cappella Soul 5 (2018)
- A Cappella Soul 6 (2019)
- Darkness to Redemption (2019)
- A Cappella Soul 7 (2020)
- A Cappella Soul 8 (2021)
- Darkness to Redemption 2 (2021)
- A Cappella Soul 9 (2022)
- Darkness to Redemption 3 (2022)
- A Cappella Soul 10 (2023)
- A Cappella Soul EP (2023)
- Darkness to Redemption 4 (2023)
- A Cappella Soul 11 (2024)
- Darkness to Redemption 5 (2024)
- A Cappella Soul 12 (2025)
- Darkness to Redemption 6 (2025)
- A Cappella Soul 13 (2026)
- Darkness to Redemption 7 (2026)

=== Productions ===
- Ruach U'neshama (2002) (with Yisroel Mayer Merkin)
- Shabbos: Get Ready (2007) (with Avi Newmark)
- Sheves Achim (2008)
- Sheves Achim 2 (2011)
- Sheves Chaverim (2009)
- Sheves Chaverim 2 (2015)
- Ki Taavor Bamayim (2015) with Moshe Dov Goldwag and Yosef Karduner
