= Yosef Karduner =

Israeli Hasidic singer and songwriter

Yosef Karduner יוסף קרדונר
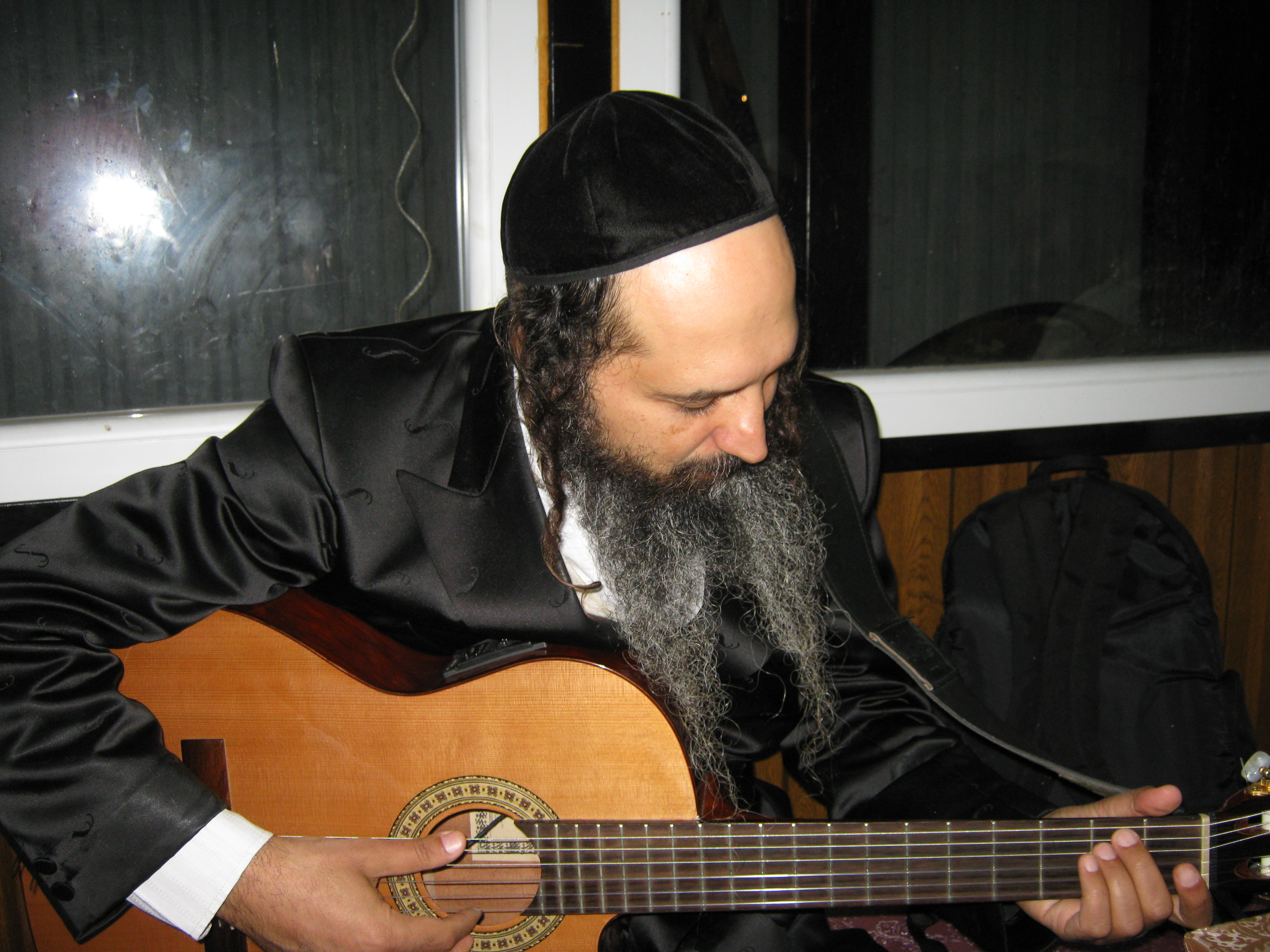
- Karduner performing at a kumzits (Jewish musical gathering) in Uman, Ukraine, 2013

Background information
- Born: Gilad Kardunos; 1969 (age 55–56); Petah Tikva, Israel
- Genres: Contemporary Jewish religious music
- Instrument: Guitar
- Years active: 2000–present

Yosef Karduner (Hebrew: יוסף קרדונר; born 1969) is an Israeli Hasidic singer, songwriter, and composer. His biggest hit, Shir LaMaalot (Psalm 121), appeared on his debut album, Road Marks (2000).

== Biography ==
Born Gilad Kardunos, he was raised in a traditionalist Jewish family in Petah Tikva, Israel. As a youth, he excelled in swimming and football. He placed second in a national competition in the 50-meter breaststroke, and competed with the Po'el Petah Tikva football team until he suffered a sprain to his ankle.

In his early teens he studied music and in particular the bass guitar. In 1987, at the age of 18, he was conscripted into the Israel Defense Forces where he played in a military musical troupe run by the Northern Command.

Following his army service Karduner formed his own rock band and was the backup guitarist for the Israeli singer Uzi Hitman. When Karduner was 24, he was introduced to the teachings of Rabbi Nachman of Breslov and the Breslover Hasidim. After discussions with Hitman and his father, who was from a Hasidic Lubavitcher family, Karduner suspended his career and began studying in a yeshiva run by the Breslover Hasidim for Jews who had turned to Orthodox Judaism ("baalei teshuva"). In the mid-1990s, as he became more religious, he changed his name from Gilad Kardunos to Yosef Karduner.

During one session of secluded prayer ("hitbodedut"), he created the tune for Shir LaMaalot ("Song to the Ascents"—Psalm 121), and one of his teachers urged him to resume his music career, this time in a vein related to Judaism. Shir LaMaalot became a hit in the Israeli religious world, inspiring other religious songwriters such as Aharon Razel to begin composing songs with lyrics from the Hebrew Bible. Shir LaMaalot has been covered by numerous Israeli artists, including Sheva.

Although he has released 11 albums, Karduner's work has not reached a wide audience due to his aversion to public relations and advertising. He rarely gives interviews. His albums are distributed in the US and he has conducted several live concert tours in New York and Chicago, including annual appearances in Crown Heights, Brooklyn from 2011 to 2019 with Aryeh Kunstler.

Karduner also joins Moshe Weinberger, rabbi of Congregation Aish Kodesh at the annual Hilula of Kalonymus Kalman Shapira, the rebbe of Piacezna. At those annual events, Weinberger preaches while Karduner performs. He and his wife, Vered, have seven children and reside in Beit Shemesh, Israel.

== Musical style ==
The teachings of Nachman of Breslov are a major source for Karduner's musical inspiration. Karduner's early albums were described as a "refreshing breeze on the Hasidic music scene". His melodies are simple and repetitive. His music also reflects soft rock, rock 'n' roll, jazz, country music, pop and Latin music.

Karduner often sets the words of the Breslover rebbe Nachman of Breslov's teachings to music, as well as composing songs based on biblical and liturgical passages. He is sometimes called "The Nightingale of Breslov". He has also been referred to as The "Sweet Singer of Breslov".

== Discography ==
Karduner has released the following albums:

- Sha'ah Achat (One Moment) (2020)
- Mesugal L'Teshuva (Capable of Repentance) (2016)
- Menorah HaZahav (The Golden Menorah) (2013)
- Dibur Pashut (Simple Talk) (2012)
- Kisufim L'Shabbat (Yearning for Shabbat) (2010)
- Kumzits: Live in New York (2010)
- Mikdash Melech (Sanctuary of the King) (2008)
- Breslever Melave Malka (2006)
- Bakesh Avdecha (Your Servant Asked) (2005)
- Osef L'yedidi (2003)
- Bechirah (Choice) (2003)
- Achat Sha'alti (I Asked One Thing) (2003)
- Mekor Chachmah (Source of Wisdom) (2002)
- Simanim Baderech (Road Marks) and Kol HaOlam (The Whole World) (2000, double album)
