= Shlomo Katz =

Israeli musical artist and rabbi

Shlomo Katz שלמה כץ
- Born: Shlomo Katz; 1980 (age 45–46); New Jersey, US
- Genres: Contemporary Jewish religious music
- Occupations: Bandleader, singer-songwriter
- Instruments: Guitar, vocals
- Years active: 2005–present
- Website: www.shlomokatz.com

Shlomo Katz (Hebrew: שלמה כץ) is a contemporary religious Jewish singer and rabbi in Israel.

== Biography ==
Shlomo Katz was born in New Jersey, the son of Cantor Avsholom Katz. His father was an Argentine immigrant from Buenos Aires, and was named for his uncle Avshalom Haviv. His family moved to Israel when he was nine years old and he has subsequently moved back and forth between Los Angeles and Israel. While studying in a Raanana yeshiva, Katz was introduced to the music and teachings of Rabbi Shlomo Carlebach.

Katz received his rabbinical ordination at Yeshivat HaMivtar in Efrat under Rosh HaYeshiva, Rav Chaim Brovender. Shlomo has been invited as a scholar in residence to university campuses and synagogues to teach Torah and give concerts, lead melave malkas and kumsitzim. He was the lead Baal Tefilah and spiritual guide in the Carlebach Minyan of Beth Jacob of Beverly Hills.

Today, Shlomo serves as the Rabbi and spiritual leader of Cong. Shirat David in Efrat, where he teaches several Torah classes weekly on various topics.

His brother, Reb Eitan, is also a well-known performer and the two often perform together.

== Musical style ==
Shlomo was born into a family of musicians, most notably his father Cantor Avshalom Katz. As a youth he sang in choirs and was trained in violin for seven years. Shlomo eventually switched to guitar and is best known for his performances with that instrument. He is a headliner in the post-Carlebach musical movement performing both his own compositions and covers.

== Discography ==
- Eilecha (with Avshalom and Eitan Katz) (1999)
- Biglal Avos (with Eitan Katz) (2001)
- VeHakohanim (2006)
- K'Shoshana (with Chaim-Dovid Saracik & Aharon Razel (2008)
- Malei Olam (2009)
- Live From Melbourne (2012)
- Likrat Shabbat (2014)
- Yismach Melech (2016)
- Brit Avot (2018)
- A Moment To Breathe (2021)
- Breslov (2022)
