= Shmuel Shapiro =

Shmuel Shapiro שמואל שפירו
- Born: Shmuel Raphael Shapiro; 26 January 1974 (age 52); Aix-les-Bains, France
- Origin: France
- Genres: Contemporary Jewish religious, Jewish music, Pop
- Occupations: Rabbi; singer; cantor; composer
- Instrument: Piano
- Years active: 1990–present
- Labels: Greentec, Ness Music France

Shmuel Shapiro (Hebrew: שמואל שפירו, born 26 January 1974) is a French Jewish rabbi, Cantor, singer, composer, and lecturer. He formerly served as the Chief Rabbi of Meurthe-et-Moselle and Nancy, France.

== Biography ==
His mother, Elisheva, is a musician and a lecturer in Judaism, and his father, David-Nathan, served as the rabbi of Clermont-Ferrand and Vichy. The family immigrated to Israel when he was nine years old.

He studied at the Ohel Shimon Erloy yeshivot in Jerusalem where he placed second in a Talmudic competition at the age of twelve.

He began composing music at the age of eleven, and by the time he was seventeen he was the principal cantorial singer in the Erlau Hasidic community.

After completing his studies in psychology and Jewish philosophy, he taught Judaism at the French-speaking Or Gabriel yeshiva in Jerusalem.

In 1994, he studied in a Kollel institute and taught in remedial education at the Tsafnat Panea'h school in Jerusalem.

He studied chazanut at Hechal Shlomo school in Jerusalem under the direction of his teachers Eli Jaffe and Benjamin Munk.

He also developed his voice with cantors Moshe Deriginski Avraham Pressman, the opera singer Gee Flashter and the maestro Daniel Gildar in Jerusalem, New York City, and Paris.

In 1998, he was sent to France by Chief Rabbi Yitzchak Dovid Grossman for an educational mission at the Ozar Hatorah school in Sarcelles and with the local Jewish community.

In 2001, Shmuel Shapiro gave lectures on Judaism, music, and voice for the radio station Kol Haneshama, broadcast in Israel and the United States. He served as cantor of Grossman's Migdal HaEmek synagogue in Israel.

In 2005, he was an educational advisor for the Chneor institutions in Aubervilliers.

From 2006 to 2020, he lectured and served as the hazzan at the synagogue of the rue de Montevideo in the 16th arrondissement of Paris.

He is an educated individual who gives courses, lectures and advice on a variety of subjects to the community.

He was the rabbi of Nancy and its region until November 2020.

His debut album, Seu Marom, was recorded in 2013 in France and Israel with arrangements by Didier Atlan. He composed the majority of the songs.

In 2022, he moved to Monaco and currently serves as rabbi and cantor in the Jewish community of Monaco, alongside Rabbi Daniel Torgmant.

He is married and has three children and four grandchildren.

== Discography ==
=== Albums ===
==== Studio albums ====
- 2013: Seu Marom (Of languages: Hebrew, French, English, Yiddish and Holy Tongue)

=== Singles ===
- 2000: Ko Amar
- 2003: Écoutez la Torah
- 2004: Ahavat Israel
- 2011: The Key
- 2012: Se'u Marom
- 2015: Ahavat Israel II
- 2016: Dos Yiddishe Lied

=== Collaborations ===
- 2002: Kel Mistater (Album: Otzrot Shabat 2, David Honig)
- 2005: Nitzotzot
- 2022: Banim Lebaneicha (Album: Psalm songs, The Goldin Project)

=== Music Videos ===
- 2011: The Key (for Gilad Shalit)
- 2013: Se'u Marom
- 2015: Ahavat Israel II
