= Simcha Leiner =

American singer, composer and entertainer

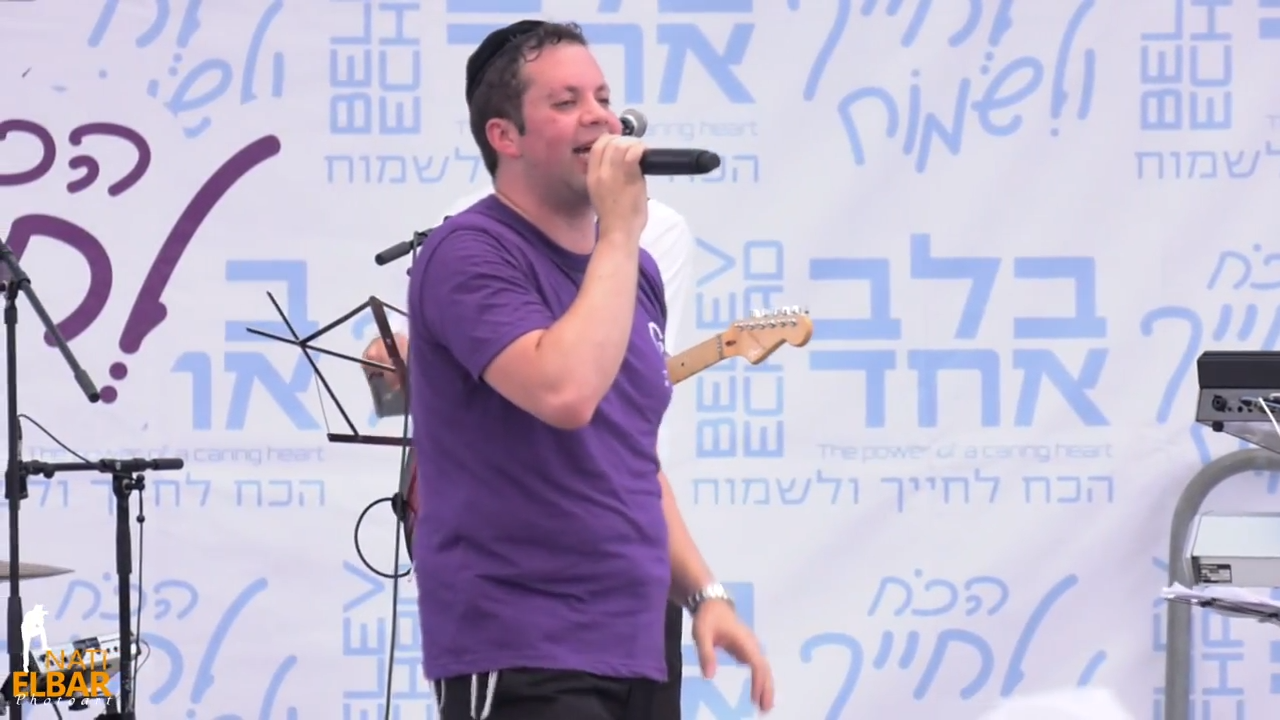
- Leiner performing in 2018

Background information
- Born: 1989 (age 35–36); Monsey, New York, United States
- Genres: Jewish music
- Years active: 2014–present
- Website: www.simchaleiner.com

Simcha Leiner (born 1989) is an American singer, composer and entertainer in the Contemporary Jewish religious music industry.

== Career ==
Leiner started singing at weddings in 2008. In 2014, he officially debuted his career with the release of his album Pischi Li. He released his single, Kol Berama. The song was composed by Leiner after the 11 March 2011 massacre in the Israeli settlement of Itamar by Palestinian terrorists. The song was used as the background in Tisha B’Av’s Chofetz Chaim Heritage Foundation’s videos. It was followed by two collaborative albums with Baruch Levine. He then released SL2 in 2015, followed by Merakeid in 2017, and Kol Hakavod in 2019. Kol Hakavod was produced by Leiner himself. In 2022; he released another album called Home.

Leiner is an advocate against bullying. In 2019, he released a single titled "Stand Up for Each Other" about the topic.

He currently resides in Toms River, NJ.

== Discography ==
- Pischi Li (2014)
- SL2 (2015)
- Merakeid (2017)
- Kol Hakavod (2019)
- Home (2022)
- Sheva 7 (2024)
