= Udi Davidi =

Israeli musical artist

Udi Davidi אודי דוידי
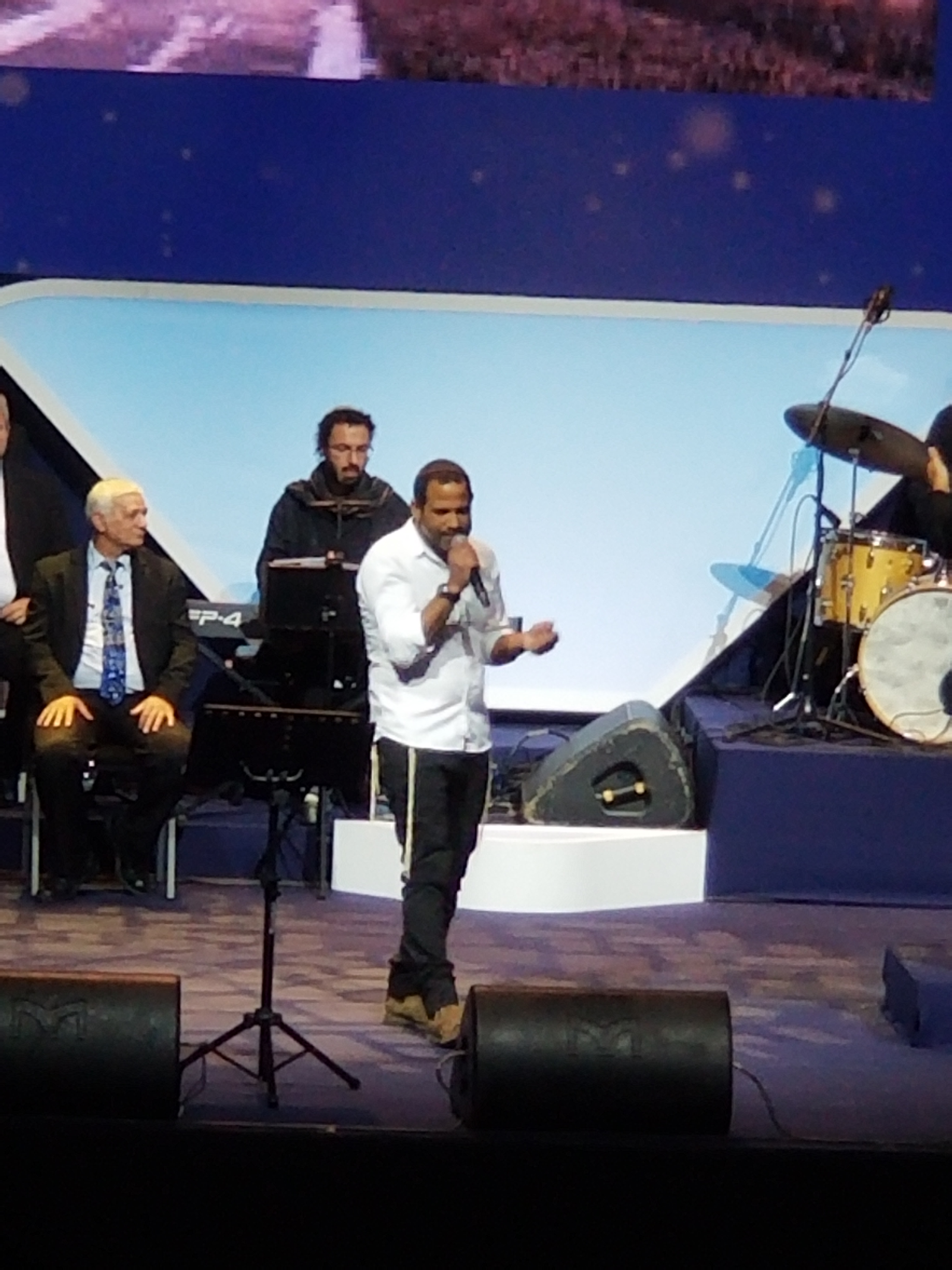

Background information
- Born: April 25, 1975 (age 51); Tel Aviv, Israel
- Genres: Jewish rock
- Occupations: Singer, musician, lyricist, composer and shepherd
- Instrument: Guitar
- Years active: Since 2004
- Label: Hatav Hashmini

Udi Davidi (Hebrew: אודי דוידי) is an Israeli singer, musician, lyricist and composer.

== Biography ==
Udi Davidi was born on April 25, 1975, and grew up in the settlement of Kedumim. When he was about 15, he met Lilach, the woman who he would later marry, through the Bnei Akiva youth groups. He served in the IDF in Sayeret Matkal, an elite special forces unit. Today he lives with his family on a farm in the West Bank village of Ma'on, Har Hebron, where he raises sheep and composes music.

== Music career ==
Davidi began his music career in 2004, when he released his first album, Speak to Him. In 2006 his second album, Coming Back to You, was released. In 2008 his third album, Time For Everything, came out, following the style of its predecessors. His fourth album, Good Spirit, was released in 2009 and served as a breakthrough in reaching the general public. The first track on the album, titled "Withholding Your Voice" was broadcast repeatedly on several Israeli radio stations, and nominated on two of them for the Discovery of the Year award. In 2011 Davidi's fifth album, Beloved Son, was released. It includes a duet with popular Israeli singer Shlomi Shabat. His sixth album entitled "Waiting For Silence" was released in 2014. Orot Gevohim, Davidi's seventh album, was released in time for the High Holidays of 2015. His third album sold over 10,000 copies and was picked for the Galgalatz playlist. He has written songs with his wife Lilach Davidi. He plays drums and often performs playing drums and singing simultaneously.

Davidi has music on the CD Israel's Greatest Hits 2010. He also appears on the compilation CD Kumzitz for Yeshiva Bochurim, in Eretz Yisroel.

During Hanukkah 2008 he appeared in the musical production of Hershele in Chelm (a "kosher" and educational alternative to the secular Hanukkah extravaganzas), for which he wrote the title song. Davidi performed for over 8,000 people at a celebration to honor the Garinim Torani'im program. The audience included soldiers and their families as well as several ministers and members of Knesset. His music is featured on Breslev Beams Radio, an internet radio station.

Davidi often writes about the relationship between God and man, and is influenced by the teachings of Rabbi Nachman of Breslov.

== Discography ==
- Speak To Him (2004), דבר אליו
- Coming Back to You (2006), חוזר אליך
- Time For Everything (2008), לכל זמן
- Good Spirit (2009), רוחות טובות
- Beloved Son (2011), בן אהוב
- Waiting For Silence (2014), מחכה לַשקט
- Headlights (2015), אורות גבוהים
