= Aharon Razel =

Israeli musician

Aharon Razel אהרן רזאל
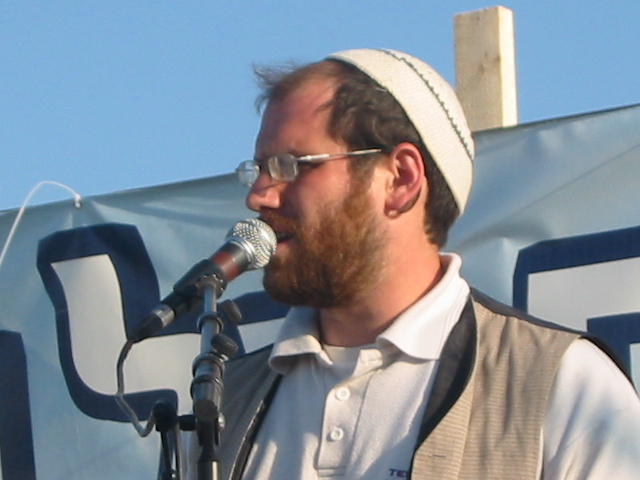
- Aharon Razel in Migron

Background information
- Born: 1974 (age 51–52); New York City
- Origin: Jerusalem, Israel
- Genres: Hasidic alternative
- Occupation: Singer-songwriter
- Instruments: Vocals, guitar
- Years active: 1999–present
- Label: HaTav HaShmini
- Website: www.aharonrazel.co.il

Aharon Razel (Hebrew: אהרן רזאל; born in 1974) is an Israeli musician. His music explores topics such as the Torah, Orthodox Judaism and living in Israel.

== Biography ==
Born in New York City in 1974, Razel came to Israel with his family when he was one month old. He started playing various instruments at an early age, mainly the piano, guitar, violin and recorder. He composed small pieces for different ensembles.

When Razel was in 4th grade, his family became religious so he moved to a religious school. When he was in 7th grade he switched back to secular education, attending Hebrew University High School.

In 1988, he started harpsichord, playing with David Shemer, and a year later doing composition with Andre Hajdu.

At the age of 15, Razel was accepted to the Jerusalem Rubin Music and Dance Academy harpsichord and composition departments, where he obtained a Bachelor of Music degree in 1994. He completed his MA degree in composition at Bar-Ilan University under the guidance of Andre Hajdu.

During his period of studies in the Music Academy, Razel played harpsichord with different ensembles throughout the country. At the same time, he composed various chamber music works which were performed at the Jerusalem Theatre and Tel Aviv Museum. He has been awarded AICF scholarships since 1990.

In 1992, the Israel Chamber Orchestra performed his piece "Shalom Rav Shooveh".

In addition to his activities in the field of classical music, Razel also composed 'light' music, and together with his brother, Yonatan Razel, had a record published by Phonokol in 1991.

He completed his army service as "outstanding musician". He then went through self-searching which led him to visit in Tzfat; in 1996, he moved there.

He has produced nine albums.

Razel is married and lives in the Nachlaot neighborhood of Jerusalem.

== Selected discography ==
- Water From the Rock (1999)
- Redemption Time (2001)
- The Burning Bush (2003)
- Song of Zion (2004)
- Live in Jerusalem (2005)
- Orange Days (2005)
- Connected to You (2007)
- K'Shoshana (with Shlomo Katz & Chaim-Dovid Saracik) (2008)
- Secret of Shabbos (with Yerachmiel Ziegler) (2009)
- What Have You Done Today (2011)
- Kavati Et Moshavi (I have made my place) (2013)
- The Man at the End of the Tunnel (2015)
- Until I Find A Place (2017)
- Ha'Neshama Rotzah Yoteir (The Soul Desires More) (2019)

== See also ==
- Music of Israel
