= Yonatan Razel =

American-Israeli musical artist

Yonatan Razel יונתן רזאל
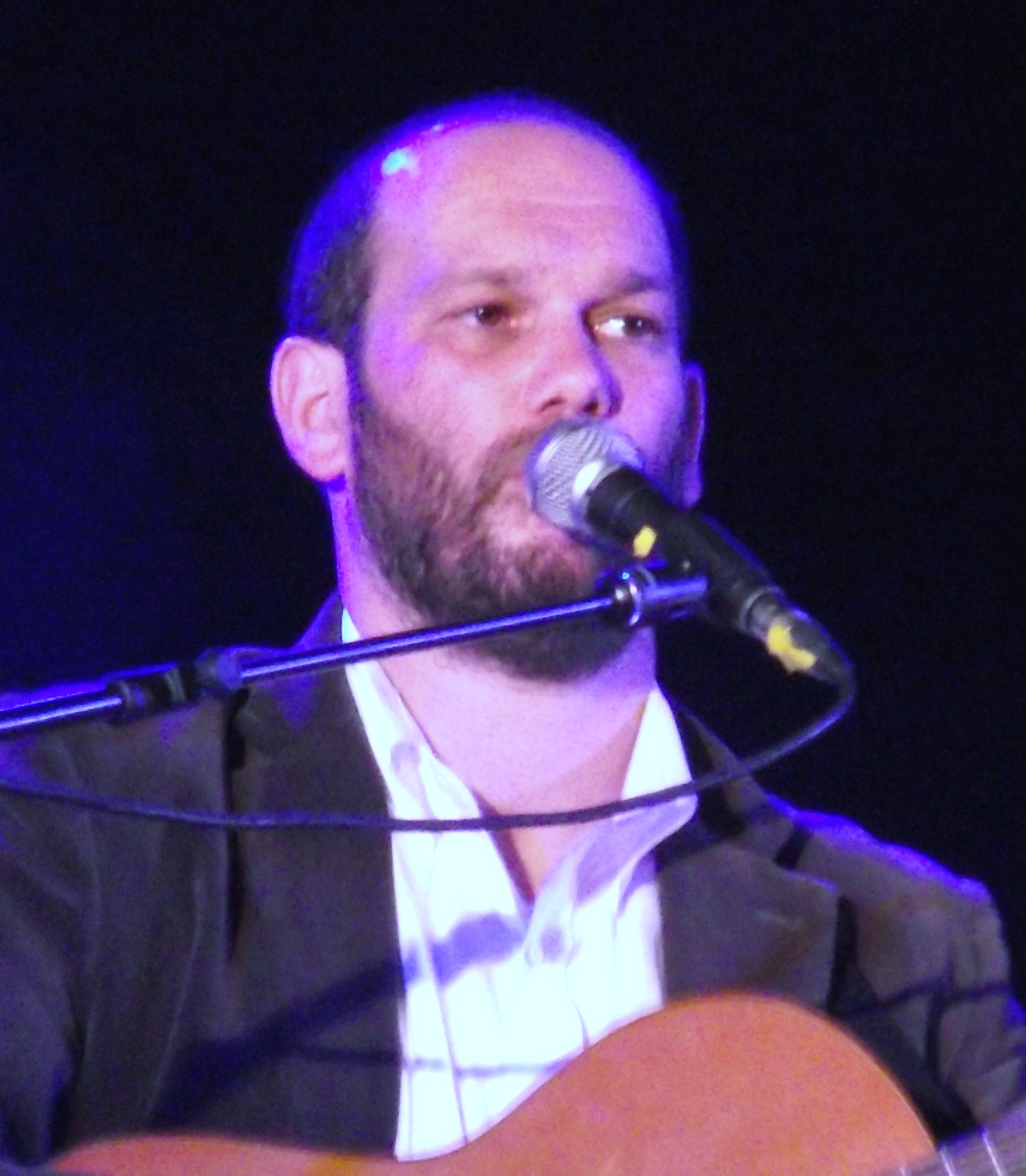
- Yonatan Razel in July 2010

Background information
- Born: Yonatan Razel; May 25, 1973 (age 53); New York City
- Origin: Jerusalem, Israel
- Genres: Contemporary Jewish religious music
- Occupations: Singer-songwriter, composer, arranger, conductor
- Instruments: Guitar, vocals, piano, cello
- Years active: 2007–present
- Website: www.yonatanrazel.com

Yonatan Razel (Hebrew: יונתן רזאל) is an American-Israeli singer, writer, composer, musical arranger and conductor.

== Biography ==
Yonatan Razel was born in New York and moved to Israel at a young age with his family.

Razel is the brother of musicians Aaron Razel and Ricka Van Leeuwen, and the cousin of the violinist Nitzan Chen Razel. As a child he learned to play on piano and cello, and studied conducting with Mendi Rodan. With his siblings Aharon, Yehuda and Ricka, the Razels formed a band and performed on Rivka Michaeli's program. Razel's army service was as a musician and arranger for the IDF military band. After his release, he studied conducting and was the conductor for the Israel Chamber Orchestra and the Ra'anana Symphonette.

For a number of years Razel abandoned his music, moved to Susya, where he worked as a shepherd and studied psychology. An offer to arrange music came from Yoni Rechter and drew him back into the musical world. This performance won warm reactions, and was later included in a "Best of.." collection by Yoni Rechter. This was also when Razel met and befriended Evyatar Banai.

He currently lives in Givat Zev HaChadasha, Israel, is married to Yael and has three daughters and one son.

He learns in the Jerusalem Kollel under the direction of Rabbi Yitzchak Berkovits.

In June 2026, Razel was hospitalized after suffering a brain hemorrhage. His family later stated that his condition was stable and requested prayers for his recovery.

== Musical career ==
In 2007, after 12 years of work, Razel released his first album, All in All, produced by Eviatar Banai. Three radio singles from the album were "All in all", "Zion", and "I am my prayer". The album was followed by a solo tour.

Razel won "Singer of the Year" and "Song of the Year" from Ynet in the fall of 2007.

Razel gained fame in 2009 for setting the Jewish liturgical poem "Vehi Sheamda" to music for Yaakov Shwekey. Israeli Haredi radio station Kol Chai named the song its "Song of the Decade" as the song became popular with both secular and religious listeners, becoming an anthem for the holiday of Passover in Israel.

== Discography ==
- All in All (2007)
- In Between the Sounds (2012)
- Open To Change (2017)
- Live at Heichal HaTarbut (2018)

== See also ==
- Aaron Razel
- Music of Israel
