= Yom-Tov Ehrlich =

Hasidic musician and entertainer

- Yom-Tov Ehrlich

Background information
- Born: 1914; Kozhan Gorodok, Russian Empire
- Died: 1990 (aged 75–76)

Rabbi Yom-Tov Ehrlich (Hebrew: יום-טוב עהרליך) (1914–1990) was a Hasidic musician, composer, lyricist, and recording artist known for his popular Yiddish music albums. He was born in Kozhan Gorodok and raised in the nearby Davyd-Haradok, both then part of the Russian Empire. He survived the Holocaust in Samarkand, Soviet Union. In 1946 he left, eventually settling in Williamsburg, Brooklyn, New York, United States.

Ehrlich was born to a family of Karlin-Stoliner Hasidim.

Some of Ehrlich's favorite songs were later recorded by other popular Hasidic entertainers, such as Mordechai Ben David, Lipa Schmeltzer, Levy Falkowitz, & Avraham Fried, although Ehrlich himself used Russian classical and folk melodies to accompany his own Yiddish lyrics.

His most popular songs include: "Yakkob", the tale of a Jew in Uzbekistan during the Holocaust; "Shloof mein kind" ("Sleep, my child"), the song of a Jewish woman who finds a child alone in the woods during the Holocaust; and "Williamsburg", a song about Hasidic Williamsburg during the 1950s.

== Discography ==
- The Wandering Jewish Folk Singer (1949)
- Yiddish Nachas (1960)
- Torah (1961)
- T'shuva (1962)
- Shema B'ni (1963)
- Ameritchka (1964)
- Emunah (1965)
- Shabbos (1967)
- Luksus (Double Album) (1967)
- Chevlei Moshiach (Double Album) (1969)
- Shabchi Yerushalayim (1970)
- Middois (1973)
- Dai (1974)
- Shelo Asani Goy (1975)
- Journey Through Song 1 - Lamnatzeach B'naginos (1975)
- Journey Through Song 2 - Mizmor L'sodah (1975)
- Kol Mevaser (1977)
- Yetzias Mitzrayim (2 Volumes) (1978)
- Chessed
- Elliyohu Hanuvee
- A Shabbus Mitten Rebben
- Der Satmerer Rebbe (2 Volumes) (1981)
- Der Baal Shem Tov (2 Volumes)
- Emunas Tzadikim
- Shoshanas Yaakov
- Ashreinu (2 Volumes)
- Hallel
- Rannenu Tzadikim (2 Volumes)
- Modeh Ani
- Bitachon
