= Yoni Z =

American pop singer (born 1991)

- Born: Yonatan Zigelboum; November 4, 1991 (age 35); Brooklyn, New York City, U.S.
- Occupation: Singer
- Years active: 2007–present
- Spouse: Ashley Eden (m. 2025)
- Children: 1
- Musical career
- Genre: Jewish music

Yonatan Zigelboum (born November 4, 1991), known by his stage name Yoni Z, is an American Hasidic pop singer. He has released two albums and several music videos. His songs mix Western pop and Mizrahi music.

== Early life ==
Zigelboum was born on November 4, 1991 in the Crown Heights neighborhood of Brooklyn, New York City. Zigelboum's father, Moti Zigelboum, is an Ashkenazi Jew and a former cantor while his mother is a Sephardic Jew, and he grew up in the Chabad community. He also has family members who survived the Holocaust. He attended yeshiva at the United Lubavitch Yeshiva of Crown Heights and then Yeshiva of Lubavitch in Monsey, New York.

At age fifteen, his rosh yeshiva reportedly told him that he was not suited for yeshiva. He left and tried working with video editing and working at a museum, and studied psychology at Touro College.

As a child he had stage fright. He started singing Haredi music at weddings after his first successful wedding in Toronto, Canada in August 2007. For two years, he performed every night exclusively in Crown Heights in order to gain experience. After people struggled to pronounce his surname, he adopted the stage name Yoni Z.

== Career ==
On July 26, 2018, Zigelboum released his debut album Yoni Z, consisting of 14 songs. It was produced by Yanky Katina, and Zigelboum participated in the songwriting and production of all album tracks. It includes catchy and upbeat songs which combine Western pop with Mizrahi music. The songs are both in English and Hebrew, including a few songs based on Biblical verses. The album has been called "revolutionary" for Jewish music. The album sold out during the pre-order, and immediately went into a second production. He released music videos of each of the tracks.

His second album, Ahava, was released on May 18, 2022. It included twelve tracks, most of which were written and composed by Zigelboum himself and arranged by Shloimy Zaltzman. It includes different diverse genres including Indian, African, orchestral, pop, and country.

In October 2018, Zigelboum was chosen as Israel's Kikar HaShabbat's Best New Artist of the Year and Music Video of the Year for the Israeli video "UP". He has performed singing the national anthem at a Miami Heat game in 2014, a Brooklyn Jewish Heritage Night performance hosted by the Brooklyn Nets in December 2015, and a Miami Heat Jewish Heritage Night half-time concert in December 2016. He also performed at a Passover program in Montego Bay, Jamaica, in 2018.

=== Music videos ===
Zigelboum has released several lavish music videos, including several prior to his debut album. In August 2018, Yoni released the music video "Kadima", setting a record for the number of music videos released from one Jewish music album. The video for "Ma Naaseh" was shot in the snow in the Carpathian Mountains of Romania, and he video of "Kadima" was filmed in the Eilat Mountains in Israel. The animated video for "UP", created by a team of fifteen people, uses a child-friendly approach to convey its message. His music video for "Hallelukah" was fimed in Ukraine and shows various types of people dancing at a silent disco, and was the first Jewish music video to show women prominently.

== Discography ==
=== Albums ===
- Yoni Z (2018)
- Ahava (2022)

== Personal life ==
On January 13, 2025, Zigelboum announced his engagement to Ashley Eden, a financial technology professional from Mexico City. They got married on April 27, 2025, in Brooklyn, New York, and had a daughter in March 2025. As of 2026 he lives in the Upper East Side of Manhattan, New York.

In May 2024, he was injured in a motorcycle accident in Rome when the Vespa bike he was riding was caught in a pothole, leading him to break bones in seven places. He was evacuated back to the United States ten days later, and spent over a year recovering through physical therapy, during which he cancelled all performances.
