= Dana Mase =

American pop singer and songwriter

Dana Mase is an American Orthodox Jewish pop singer and songwriter. She has released five albums so far: Diary (1994), Sitting with an Angel (1995), Through the Concrete & the Rocks (1998), Thread of Blue (2004) and The Colors of Black and White (2007). She is mostly known for the title track from Sitting with an Angel, which was featured in the television show Dawson's Creek. Her music also appeared on ESPN's Cold Pizza and CBS' Joan of Arcadia. She has worked with producers Steve Addabbo in Through the Concrete and Rocks and Neil Dorfsman in Thread of Blue. In 1997 she performed at Arlene's Grocery in Manhattan.

Her single “She Never Knew She Never Knew” (music video: ) addresses institutionalization of the disabled.
