= Shloime Dachs =

- Birth name: Shloime Dachs
- Genres: Orthodox pop
- Occupation: Singer
- Instrument: Vocals
- Years active: 1996–present
- Labels: Sameach
- Website: shloimedachs.com

Shloime Dachs is an American Orthodox pop vocalist. He is also the founder of the eponymous Shloime Dachs Orchestra, which plays at weddings, concerts, and benefits.

== Biography ==
Dachs was born in New York. He has one brother and one sister. His parents divorced when he was 13. He spoke publicly about being a child of divorced parents at the 88th National Convention of Agudath Israel of America in 2010.

Dachs began singing at age 7 with the Yeshiva Torah Vodaas school choir and joined the three main choirs of the era: the Miami Boys Choir, Tzlil V'Zemer, and Amudai Shaish Boys Choir. He sang the solos on the first 613 Torah Avenue albums.

In 1996 Dachs released his debut album, One Day at a Time. His introduction to the Jewish music scene precipitated many simcha and concert appearances. He released his second solo album, Acheinu, in 1998, and his third solo album, K'ish Echod B'Lev Echad, in 2001.

Dachs assembled the Shloime Dachs Orchestra in 2003. This band has performed at hundreds of weddings, bar mitzvahs, organization dinners and concerts.

His fourth solo album, Avinu, released in 2003, was the first to include an interactive computer video depicting an experience of Israel. His fifth solo album, Hashem Echad, released in 2007, also including an interactive computer video, marked the singing debut of Dachs' son Dovid. His sixth album, Dance All Night With the Shloime Dachs Orchestra, was released in 2009.

He has collaborated on albums with other Orthodox Jewish singers such as Mendy Wald (Listig & Lebedig, 1999), Ari Goldwag (V'Zoicher, 2010), and Yisroel Williger (The Yom-Tov Album, 2001, and The Wedding Album, 2010). He has also contributed songs to Dance Mix (1998), Chazak! (2001), and Avraham Fried Live! (2002).

== Benefit performances ==
Dachs is closely associated with the OHEL children's home and family services, both as an active board member and as a volunteer performer at concerts for residents of OHEL's community homes. He and his wife Libby host OHEL residents at their home throughout the year, including the annual Nine Days siyum and barbecue. Dachs is also a regular performer at Camp HASC and Camp Simcha Special. He has sung at the Israel Day Concert in Central Park, a Hanukkah concert benefiting the CAHAL Special-Education Program, a Long Island benefit concert to raise tuition for a special child, and a yahrtzeit concert memorializing rabbi-singer Shlomo Carlebach. In 2009 he was honored by the Chofetz Chaim Heritage Foundation for his efforts on behalf of that organization.

== Chazzan ==
Since 2002, Dachs has been a chazzan (cantor) for the High Holy Days at the Great Neck Synagogue, his childhood synagogue.

== Family ==
He and his wife, Libby, have 4 children and reside in Brooklyn, New York.

== Discography ==
=== Solo albums ===
- One Day At a Time (1996)
- Acheinu (1998)
- K'ish Echod B'Lev Echad (2001)
- Avinu (2003)
- Hashem Echod (2007)
- Dance All Night With the Shloime Dachs Orchestra (2009)

=== Collaborations ===
- Suki & Ding Present: Kumzits – The Early Years (1988)
- Kol Yaakov Orchestra - Heartzig (1991)
- Dance Mix (1998)
- Listig & Lebedig (1999)
- The Wedding Album (2000)
- Chazak! (2001)
- The Yom-Tov Album (2001)
- 100% (2001)
- Avraham Fried Live! (2002)
- V'Zoicher (2003)
- Special Moments (2003)
- Sounds of Today (2005)
