= Yehuda Green =

Israeli singer and composer (born 1959)

Yehuda Green יהודה גרין
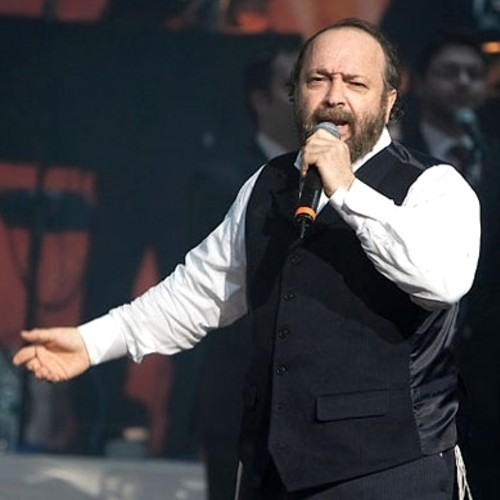

Background information
- Born: 1959 (age 66–67); Jerusalem, Israel
- Genres: Jewish music
- Occupations: Singer, composer, hazzan
- Instruments: Vocals, Guitar
- Years active: 2007–present
- Website: www.yehudagreen.com

Yehuda Green (Hebrew: יהודה גרין), born 1959, is a Hasidic Jewish singer and composer, and hazzan at the Carlebach Shul on Manhattan's Upper West Side. Singing in the style of singer-rabbi Shlomo Carlebach (1925–1994), he has been called "more Carlebach than Carlebach", and is acclaimed for his heartfelt renditions of Carlebach's songs.

== Biography ==
Yehuda Green was born in the Mea Shearim area of Jerusalem to a family of Breslover Hasidim. He heard his first Shlomo Carlebach album when he was five years old, and was encouraged by his father to sing Carlebach's composition, "Mimkomcha" ("From Your Place"), again and again. He enjoyed singing Carlebach's songs at the Lubavitcher yeshiva that he attended. In 1969 he attended his first Carlebach performance, and began frequenting Carlebach's Melaveh Malkah performances on Saturday nights on Mount Zion whenever the singer was in Israel. After his bar mitzvah, Green went to hear Carlebach lead the prayers at the Western Wall on Friday nights.

In 1980 Green attended a kumzits in Golders Green, London, where Carlebach was performing. Carlebach invited him to sing with him at a concert he was giving the following night. Green says he was so embarrassed that he agreed to perform only from behind a curtain.

Green made his first recording of Carlebach songs in the early 1990s, and asked Carlebach for his opinion. The singer wasn't happy with the arrangements, which put Green in a difficult position with his music arranger. In the end, the material was destroyed in a fire at the recording studio.

== Music career ==
Green released his first album, Land of Your Soul, in 2007. This and subsequent albums feature a combination of Green's own compositions and Carlebach pieces. One of the tracks on Green's first album, "Nishmas Kol Chai", became a favorite at kumzits gatherings in the Orthodox Jewish world, and Green acquired a following in Hasidic communities in Williamsburg and Monroe.

Green attracts both religious and secular fans to his concerts. He was the headliner at the two "Kumzits on the Hudson" concerts in 2008 and 2009. In 2014 he was the featured singer at a Yom HaAtzmaut gala at the Terrace on the Park in Queens, New York.

Green frequently performs at charity benefits. He was one of over 30 Orthodox Jewish superstars appearing on the 2010 Unity for Justice album to benefit the legal defense of Sholom Rubashkin. He was a featured singer at the HASC 22 "A Time for Music" concert in 2009. At the HASC 24 "A Time for Duets" concert in 2011, he sang an on-stage duet with Jewish singer Ohad and a virtual duet with Shlomo Carlebach, as the latter appeared on video footage. Green also lends his talents to annual musical evenings for the elderly and special needs population in Crown Heights. In 2024, Green released an album titled Amar Abayeh.

== Hazzan ==
In the late 1990s Green was asked to lead the High Holy Days prayers at the Carlebach Shul on the Upper West Side of Manhattan. He became an official hazzan at that synagogue in 1998. He leads the Shabbat prayer services twice monthly. His Carlebach-style Selichot prayers for the Carlebach Shul, which are held at the West Side Institutional Synagogue with guitar and violin accompaniment, attract upwards of 1,000 participants.

== Discography ==
- Land of Your Soul (2007)
- Yearning (2010)
- Peace in My Heart (2012)
- Barcheini (2015)
- Neshameleh (2018)
- Amar Abayeh (2024)
