= Motty Steinmetz =

Israeli Hasidic musical artist

Motty Steinmetz מוטי שטיינמץ
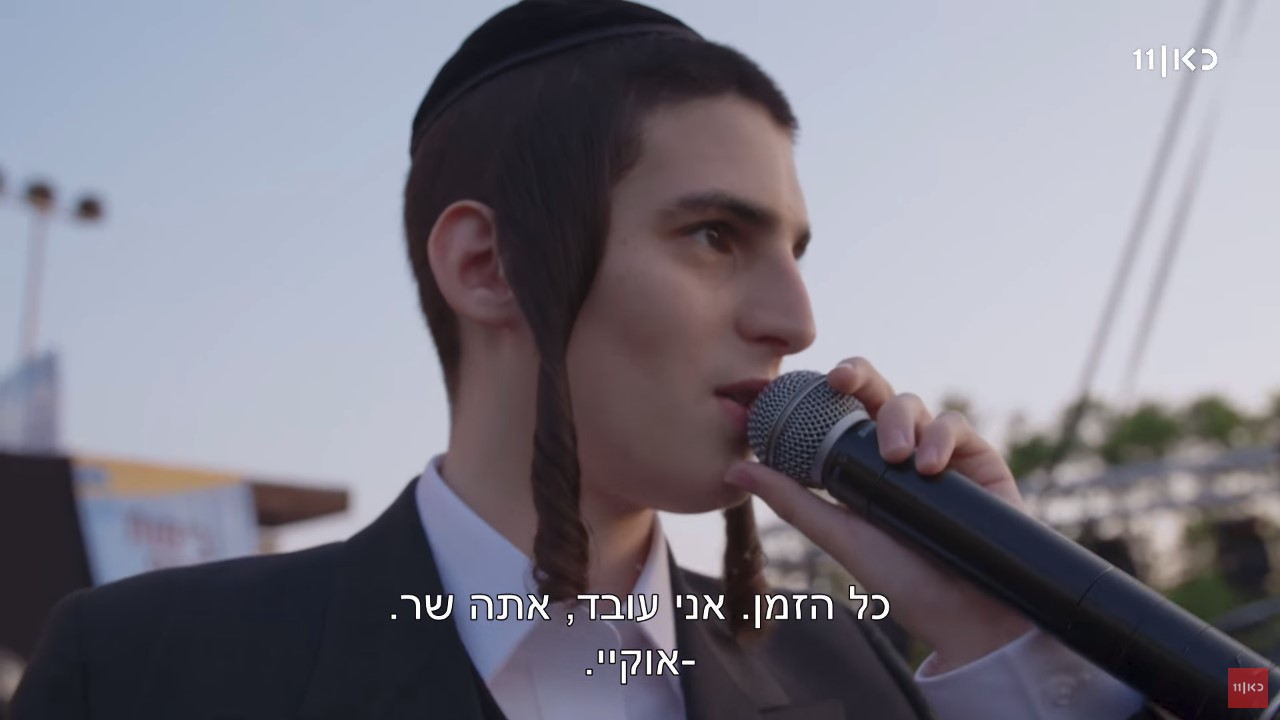

Background information
- Born: Mordecai Steinmetz; 5 July 1992 (age 34); Rehovot, Israel
- Genre: Jewish music
- Occupation: Singer
- Years active: 2012–present
- Website: mottysteinmetz.co

Yisrael Baruch Mordechai "Motty" Steinmetz (Hebrew: מוטי שטיינמץ) is a prominent Hasidic singer.

== Biography ==
Steinmetz was born in 1992 to a Vizhnitz family in Bnei Brak. Motty is the son of Rabbi Moshe and Rebecca Steinmetz, and the fourth of nine children. He is of Ashkenazi descent.

When Steinmetz was fourteen, his grandfather moved from Antwerp, Belgium, to Israel and taught him many traditional Vizhnitz tunes which influenced his musical style. In his early teens, he was spotted by producer and composer Ruvi Banet, who would later become his manager. Steinmetz sings religious Jewish songs, with the lyrics often being taken directly from scripture or prayers, and is known for the great emotion he puts into his music. In accordance with his ultra-Orthodox interpretation of the Jewish laws of modesty, he never performs to mixed audiences of men and women, unless there is a mechitza (separation). He has also visited a hospital in Israel to sing to an accident victim.

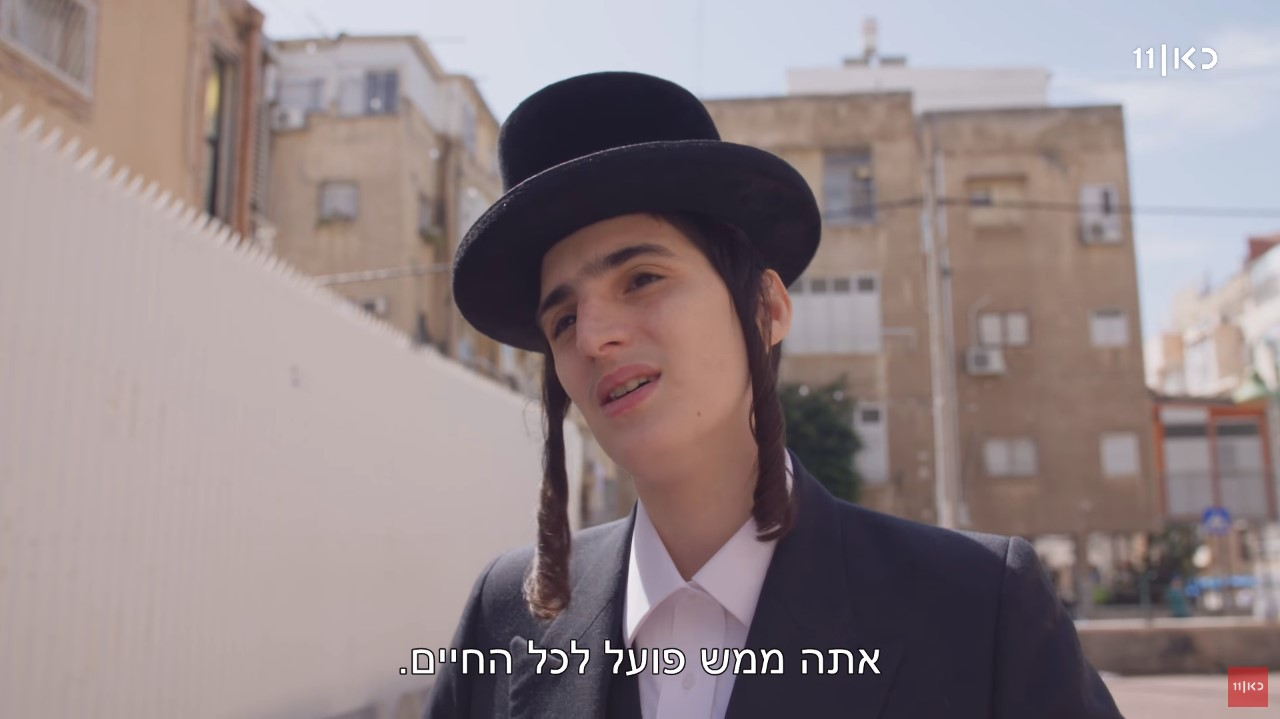
Steinmetz on Kan 11

In 2017, he released his debut album Haneshama Bekirbi, with Ashkenazi Chief Rabbi of Israel David Lau and the mayors of Bnei Barak and El'ad present at the launch of the album. The album reportedly took four years of work to finish, and achieved platinum certification in Israel.

In 2018, the Israeli national broadcaster Kan 11 produced an episode documenting Steinmetz's life and music.

Steinmetz was at the centre of a controversy about gender-segregated concerts in the summer of 2019. Steinmetz was scheduled to perform to a gender-segregated audience in Afula. This was challenged in the local courts with a judge recommending that the audience be split three ways with the addition of a mixed gender area. However, this ruling was challenged in the high court by a woman's activists’ group. The high court ruled that the segregation was illegal, but the judgment was only passed as the concert was finishing. Steinmetz said that he found the controversy “infuriating” and that he had received praise from Haredi politicians Aryeh Deri and Moshe Gafni. After all this, a male-only Steinmetz concert in Haifa was shut down by judges.

== Personal life ==
At age 23, Steinmetz was introduced to his wife Malka Weisel by a matchmaker. Weisel is the daughter of the head of the conversion system at Rabbi Karelitz's court in Bnei Brak who is also the rabbi of the Yeshivot students in Modi'in Illit. In 2015, Steinmetz married Weisel, with Hasidic singer Mordechai Ben David as a guest at the wedding. In 2017, the couple had a first daughter, Esther Steinmetz, and in 2020 had another daughter.

== Discography ==
=== Studio albums ===
- Haneshama Bekirbi (2017)
- Atik Yomin (2022)
- Emunah Ubitachon (2025)

=== Singles ===
	Single name	Release date	YouTube Views (April 2023)
1	Tseno Ureno	28 July 2015	13,967,745
2	Nafshi	10 June 2019	11,797,468
3	Haneshama Bekirbi	25 February 2017	7,807,965
4	Zechor Bris	25 September 2017	2,475,887
5	Yehei Raava	5 June 2019	1,741,731
6	Al Tashlicheini	6 September 2018	594,514
7	Le'oso Hazman	5 March 2017	537,774
8	Ta'isi	4 June 2018	489,096

- Rachmaneh (2015)
- Eitz Chaim (2015)
- Vesorev (2015)
- Shifchi Kamayim (2015)
- El Hana'ar Hazeh (2015)
- Elokim Al Domi Lach (2015)
- K'ayal Ta'arog (2015)
- B'sheim Hashem (2015)
- Tzeinah Uraeinah (2015)
- V'hi Rachamecha (2015)
- Ilan (2015)
- Nafshi (2018) (with Ishay Ribo)
- Nigun Vizhnitz (2020)
- Veomar Bayom Hahu (2020)
