= Miriam Israeli =

American-born lyricist and singer

Miriam Israeli (Hebrew: מרים ישראלי; born 1966), also known as Miri Israeli (Hebrew: מירי ישראלי) is an American-born lyricist and singer of contemporary Jewish religious music. Her biggest hits are "Ima Tagidi Li" ("Mother, Tell Me"), "Yesh Tikvah" ("There Is Hope") (co-written with Ari Goldwag), and "Tikvah LeYeled" ("Hope for the Child"). She performs internationally for women-only audiences.

== Biography ==
She was born and raised in Borough Park, Brooklyn, New York, where she graduated from Bais Yaakov Academy High School. After her marriage, she immigrated to Israel and began composing songs for the Song Nights held at the Beth Jacob Jerusalem seminary. It was for one of these events that she composed "Ima Tagidi Li" ("Mother, Tell Me"), which became internationally popular in Jewish girls schools and camps. She also started an after-school choir for English-speaking high school girls.

She released her first album of songs in 1999; however, her songs on this and a subsequent album were recorded by male vocalists per the directive of her Rav. Her songs have been recorded by Benny Friedman, Yaakov Shwekey, Ari Goldwag, and others. She performs her own songs in concert tours for women- and girl-only audiences in the United States, England, and Israel.

She is also a freelance writer and author of a serialized diary, "Music Maker", for Mishpacha magazine.

== Personal life ==
Miriam and her husband have 11 children; they reside in the Romema neighborhood of Jerusalem.

== Discography ==
- A New Experience in Song (1999)
- Amen (2010)
