= Miami Boys Choir =

- The choir performing in 2007 at a 30th Anniversary Concert.

Background information
- Origin: Miami Beach, Florida
- Genres: Orthodox pop, Jewish music, Jewish rock, Jewish pop, Fusion, Religious music
- Years active: 1977–present
- Website: https://miamiboyschoir.com/

The Miami Boys Choir (MBC) is a boys' choir specializing in Orthodox pop since 1977.

== History ==
In the early 1970s while studying in yeshivah in Toronto, Canada, Yerachmiel Begun created, directed, and recorded three successful albums with the Toronto (Pirchei) Boys Choir. However, in 1976 formed by Yerachmiel Begun as well, the Miami Boys Choir was part of a larger surge in popularity of Orthodox Jewish choral music. The use of an all-boy choir is related to a common interpretation of Orthodox Jewish law (halachah) of kol isha which they hold prohibits males above the age of majority from listening to non-familial females singing even on audio recordings.

While the group was formed in Miami Beach, Florida, after releasing the first few albums, Begun moved the choir to New York. Although he retained the "Miami" in the name of the group, subsequent albums were released with boys primarily from the New York/New Jersey area.

Yerachmiel Begun was the composer for almost all of the songs featured on his Toronto and Miami albums. In addition, he had composed many songs for a number of other Jewish music singers and groups including Simchatone, Kol Salonika (with Rabbi Boruch Chait), Kol Hakavod, Camp S'dei Chemed International, Mordechai Ben David, and Ira Heller. Yerachmiel conducted the boys choir on the NCSY record from 1979. In 1981, Yerachmiel composed the songs for the group and hit album titled "Judaea". At the 6th annual HASC A Time For Music concert in 1993, paying tribute to Jewish composers, Begun was listed and mentioned as one of the Top Ten Composers of Jewish Music. Yerachmiel has worked side by side with a number of arrangers for his compositions, including Yisroel Lamm (the Neginah Orchestra), Suki Berry, Moshe Laufer, Mona Rosenblum, Hershel Lebovits, Vladimir Grinberg, and others.

Over the years, the choir's imaging has changed with the times. Originally called the "Miami Choir Boys," its name has alternated between "Miami Boys Choir" and "Yerachmiel Begun and the Miami Boys Choir." In addition, the album titles have slowly changed over time from just Hebrew/Aramaic titles (i.e., B'syata D'shamaya) to English and Hebrew together (e.g., Torah Today) and finally to the present format, which places "Miami" before the title (i.e., Miami Moshiach).

Compared to mainstream artists, the choir has not had spectacular results in terms of sales. However, in the Jewish music world, they are recognized as a success story. An example is their album released in 2005, Miami Revach, which reportedly sold over 15,000 copies in the first few weeks alone.

=== Viral resurgence ===
The Miami Boys Choir experienced a resurgence in popularity in 2022, after Yerachmiel Begun's son established a TikTok account and posted clips of the group performing. One clip, a recording of 4 soloists (Yoshi Bender, Akiva Abramowitz, David Herskowitz, and Binyamin Abramowitz) performing an arrangement of Psalms 125:2 ('Yerushalayim') became a viral sensation. It has accrued over 10.8 million views as of May 5 that year. Users have been known to 'duet' the video offering glowing assessments of the soloists' performances, proclaiming their 'biases' (favorite members) within the group, in the same vein as fans of Korean idol groups.

== Prominent soloists and alumni ==
- Ari Goldwag
- Shloime Dachs
- Shmuel Boteach
- Nachman Seltzer
- Mordechai Shapiro
- Yaakov Shwekey

== Discography ==
Title	Year released	Comments
Victory Entebbe	1977	In 1977, Yerachmiel Begun released his first album, called "Victory Entebbe", against the background of the Entebbe operation that happened a year before. Yerachmiel composed all the songs, while the arrangements were entrusted to Yisrael Lamm, who had already arranged the Toronto Boys Choir albums. Among the songs that became hits you can find 'Moshe’ and ‘Bamorom'.
Miami Meets Toronto	1978	Prior to starting the Miami Boys Choir, Yerachmiel Begun lived and directed a choir in Toronto, Ontario. This album features a collaboration between the Miami Choir Boys, (as they were then called), and the Toronto Boys Choir. One song on this album, entitled 'Mr Carter', was about the president Jimmy Carter.
Miami Live	1979	In the first live Miami show, many songs became hits. One of these being the now classic slowly sung "Baruch Hagever" which was originally recorded and featured on Kol Hakavod (circa 1976-'77), Toronto Boys Choir 3 (1979), The Chevra (1982) and later more famously sung solo by Ari Goldwag at Miami Experience 2 (1992).
B'Siyata Dishmaya	1984	In 1980, Yerachmiel moved to New York, where he founded a new choir with children from Brooklyn and the surrounding area. The choir in Miami was such a great success that the name "Miami Boys Choir" remained, even though the choir is based in New York today. In 1984, the fourth album "B’siyata D’shmaya" was released. This album, arranged by Moshe Laufer, is considered one of the greatest successes of the choir, with most of the songs on the album becoming hits: 'Kail', 'L’murunun', 'Achas', 'B’siyata D’shmaya', 'Ono B’koach', 'Ez Tzemach' and 'Kol Yisroel'. The title song is performed by soloist Jonathan Paley, the first star among the choir's vocalists. In one performance where he lost his voice, he was replaced by Mendy Wald from the Tzlil V’zemer Choir.
Klal Yisroel - Together	1987	The next album, released in 1987, was called "Klal Yisroel Together" and was also arranged by Moshe Laufer. One of the songs on the album, 'Menucha', is from an ancient folk tune, a song Yerachmiel particularly liked and decided to include in the choir's album. This is the only song of all the choir's songs that was not composed by Yerachmiel Begun. Another song on the album, 'The Gedolei Hador', was written with lyrics in Yiddish, and performed by Yisroel Williger, who was not an official member of the choir. Some successful songs from this album were: 'Oshira', 'Mehairah' and 'Klal Yisroel Together'. At that time, the singers Eli Lewenstein, Avraham Willig and Ophie Nat starred.
Shabbos Yerushalayim	1988	In 1988, the album "Shabbos Yerushalayim" was released, against the background of the choir's concert tour around the world, which ended in Jerusalem. The title song talks about the special atmosphere in Jerusalem and the need to preserve its sanctity. The second hit, in English, was the song ‘We Need You’, which talks about the problem of talking in the synagogue during prayer. Other hits from the album include: 'Asher Bara', 'Devai Haser' and 'Refa’einu'. The album was arranged by Yisroel Lamm, and stars the vocalists Avraham Willig and Stuie Bienenstock.
Torah Today	1990	In 1990, the album "Torah Today" was released, arranged by Moshe Laufer and starring the vocalists Nochum Stark, Jonathan Morgenstern and Avraham Solomon. This album was particularly successful, and many of its songs became hits: 'Ohr Chadash', 'Basru', 'Baruch Habah', 'Od Yishama', 'Torah T’hi', and 'Torah Today'. Among the children of the choir who participated in this album (but did not get a single solo) you can find the singer Yaakov Shwekey and the producer Danny Finkelman.
Miami Experience 1	1991	In the early 1990s, the 'golden age' of the choir began, with a series of "Experience" concerts. This was a series of huge shows, held every year on Passover, usually at Brooklyn College under the direction of Yisroel Lamm. Each show included new songs, guest artists and production of the most innovative level. Also, for the first time, albums were released for people to watch these performances. The first show was held in 1991 and was called 'Korov Hashem'. The show was released as an album in an audio version and a video version, with each of the versions including sections that were omitted in the other version.
Miami Experience 2	1992	The second show was held in 1992, and was called "On The Road To Yerushalayim". New songs were written in honour of the show, including the song 'Omdos' and 'Be A Mentsch'. A new verse in English was added to the nostalgic hit 'Hoshiva'. In the central part of the show, a musical was presented about an American boy (Nochum Stark) who travels to the Holy Land and there realizes the value of learning the Torah. The singers Moshe Yess and Sherwood Goffin took part in the musical. The show stars vocalists Nochum Stark, Ari Goldwag and Eliezer Rabinowitz .
It's Min Hashamayim	1993	In 1993, the album "It's Min Hashomayim" was released. This album is considered a ground-breaker in Orthodox Jewish music in terms of the innovative arrangements of Yisroel Lamm. Some of the songs on the album are considered to be the most identified with the choir: 'Lo Yisa Goy', 'Ani Maamin' and 'Kumt', along with other hits. The song 'Yisrael' was written about the Gulf War. This album starred Nochum Stark, Ari Goldwag and Nachman Seltzer.
Miami Experience 3	1993	In the same year, the third show in the 'Miami Experience' series took place, and was called "When Moshiach comes". The show focuses on the difficulties of exile and the expectation of the coming of the Messiah. Another part of the show was dedicated to the songs of the Toronto Boys Choir and the first days of the choir back when it was in Miami. In addition to Ari Goldwag, whose voice was already changing, the singers Oded Kariti, Yitzy Spinner and Mordechai Levovitz starred.
Miami Experience 4 - Shiru Lo	1994	The fourth performance took place in 1994, and was called "Shiru Lo". In the show, the choir's most well-known song: 'Nekadesh' was performed for the first time, and together with it the title song, 'Shiru Lo'. The performance included a journey around the world with the children of the choir dressed in traditional costumes from many countries. In this show, Shlomo Carlebach was a guest and he sang his song 'Adir Hu' with the choir. At that time, the choir counted the highest number of children in its entire history - 48 children, of which the vocalists Oded Kariti and Yitzy Spinner stood out in particular.
One By One	1995	In 1995, the album "One By One" was released, this album was extremely successful and most of its songs became hits: 'Bayom Hahu', 'Tiskabel', 'Chasdei Hashem' (which was written following the case of an Orthodox Jewish girl who was lost in the forest, and was found safe and sound against all odds), 'Zoakti', 'Sunshine', 'Elokah', 'One by One' and 'Kol Mi'. Yisroel Lamm was again entrusted with the arrangements, and Oded Kariti, Yitzy Spinner, Eric Stern and Robert Lowy were the main soloists.
Miami Experience 5	1995	That same year, during Passover, the largest performance of the choir was held, at the "Nassau Coliseum" stadium in New York, with the participation of 15,000 spectators. On the same day, a terrorist attack occurred in the United States, which almost led to the cancellation of the event. This show "sealed" the "Experiences" series. At that time, the choir was a guest on Yisroel Williger's album 'The Voice of a New Generation’.
The Simcha Song	1997	In 1997 the album "The Simcha Song" was released. In this album, the song 'Adon Olam' was particularly successful, along with the songs 'The Simcha Song' and 'Tehilas Hashem'. The album was arranged by Yisroel Lamm and stars singers Eric Stern, Daniel Gober and Zavel Pearlman.
Chanukah - Light up the Nights	1997	At the end of 1997 an album was released in honor of Hanukkah called "Light up the Nights". The album contains 4 new songs - among them the hit 'Yaaleh V’yovoh', a medley of Hanukkah songs and an instrumental version of all the songs. This album was also arranged by Yisroel Lamm, and stars the vocalists Daniel Gober, Zavel Pearlman, Eric Stern and Mendy Levin. That Hanukkah there was a big event when the choir performed in the centre of the hall on a revolving stage. This show was not published, and only in 2012 were some video clips from it published.
Stand Up	1999	The next album was released in 1999 and was called "Stand Up" . In this album, the song "Hinei Ma Tov" was particularly successful, along with the songs "Veyivtechu", "Mitzva" and "Shema Koleinu". The last song on the album 'Shabbos Candles' is sung entirely by Yerachmiel Begun, and talks about Bug 2000 . This album is also edited by Yisroel Lamm. Starring: Duvie Shapiro and Zavel Pearlman.
Yerushalayim - Can You Hear Our Voice	2001	In 2000, the choir went on tour in Israel. They appeared in Gush Katif and Haifa, and were photographed in various places in Jerusalem. This year saw the release of the compilation album "Yerushalayim- Can You Hear Our Voice" - a collection of Jerusalem themed songs from all the albums and performances, with the addition of 2 new songs: 'Yerushalayim' and 'Im Eshkochaich'. These songs were also released in an audio album version, together with a video version that included lip syncing of songs from the albums 'Stand Up' and 'The Simcha Song' with the same photos of Jerusalem in the background.
B'derech Hatorah - We Will Prevail	2001	At the end of 2001, the album "B’derech Hatorah - We Will Prevail" was released. In this album, a first collaboration was created with the arranger Mona Rosenblum who took part in the production of the album alongside Moshe Laufer and Yisroel Lamm. Among the album's hits: 'Rak Chazak', 'Lo B’ruach Hashem', 'V’hoyoh Machanechah Kodosh' and 'B’derech Hatorah- We Will Prevail'. During this period, the singers Mordechai Shapiro, Daniel Muchnick and Isaac Benishai starred in the choir.
Miami 25 - Past Present and Future	2002	In 2002, a series of performances were held in New York and New Jersey on the occasion of the choir's 25th anniversary. Among others, choir graduates Yaakov Shwekey, Shloime Dachs, Ophie Nat and Nochum Stark took part. Before one of the performances, Yerachmiel Begun broke his leg, so in some of the songs you see him sitting at the piano and not conducting the choir.
Miami and Dedi	2003	In 2003, a collaboration was formed between the choir and the Israeli singer Dedi Graucher. The singer and the choir performed together in a show called "Kol Yisroel Araivim", in which a song in Hebrew and English symbolizes the unity between the Jews in Israel and the Diaspora. The show was released in a video version, and stars Mordechai Shapiro, Isaac Benishai and Chanina Abramowitz. The song 'Kain' that opened the show was released two years later on the ‘Revach’ album.
Miami Revach	2005	In 2005, the best-selling album of the choir, "Revach", was released. Over 15,000 copies were sold in three weeks - an unprecedented achievement in the world of frum music. Most of the album's songs were successful and became hits, including the title song 'Revach', 'V’ahavta', 'Mi Adir', 'Mimkomcha', 'Yichadishahu', and 'Ribono'. Yisroel Lamm, Mona Rosenblum and Moshe Laufer participated in the arrangement of the album. The music and the adult choir were recorded in Israel, in Ken Burgess' studios, with the participation of guitarist Avi Singolda. That year, like every year, a show was held on Passover in New York, which was released in a DVD version. Prominent soloists: Shaul Elson, Yosef Schick, Zalman Pollack and Ari Rosner.
Miami Revach (DVD)	2006	
Miami Moshiach	2007	In 2006, Begun and eight of the choir's children went to a concert in Israel, after 5 years of the choir not leaving the United States due to the September 11 attacks and the security situation in Israel. They performed at a Chabad rally, at the Yad Eliyahu Sports Hall, in front of about 10,000 spectators. A song composed by Begun specially for this evening, "Moshiach", was a big hit. Following the success of the song, Yerachmiel decided to immediately release an album containing 4 new songs, a medley of nostalgic songs and excerpts from performances together with Ohad Moskowitz and Dovid Gabay. Prominent vocalists: Shaul Elson, Yoshi Bender and Ari Rosner. The album was released in 2007.
Around the Campfire	2007	In the same year, the choir released an a cappella album especially for the days of the Sefira, the album contains songs from the albums Moshiach and Revach as well as verses and songs from other albums. The album is called "Around the Campfire" and is accompanied by sound effects of a campfire and crickets.
Yavoh	2008	In preparation for Hanukkah 2009, the album "Yavo" was released. Yisroel Lamm, Moshe Laufer, Mona Rosenblum, Yitzi Bald and Yaakov Leib Rigler took part in the adaptations. Among the successful songs you can find the hit 'Ayom V’norah', 'Me’im Hashem' 'Galeh' and the title song 'Yavoh'. Among the slow songs on the album you can find 'M’heiroh' - a new melody to the words of the iconic song from the album 'Klal Yisroel' and 'Azor Noh' which is performed entirely by the vocalist Yair Kenig. Alongside Kenig, the soloists Yoshi Bender and David Herskowitz starred in the album. An a cappella version of the album was released in 2020. Later that year, a DVD version with the same name was released from the Chol Hamoed Sukkot performances at Brooklyn College. The show mainly performed songs from the album Yavo, but also songs from the album 'Moshiach'. In the summer of 2022, excerpts from the DVD were uploaded to the social network TikTok and garnered millions of views. The stars of the show: Akiva Abramowitz, Yoshi Bender, David Herskowitz and Binyamin Ravina Abramowitz.
Ultimate Miami - The Ultimate Collection	2010	A collection of the English songs over the years.
The Miami Solo Album	2010	In 2010, the album "Hisorirus " (The Miami Solo Album) was released, which unusually did not include original songs but versions of well-known songs, performed by soloists from the choir that were recorded several years before their voices began to change. Participants: Shaul Elson, Yair Kenig, Binyamin Ravina Abramowitz and David Herskowitz.
Mi L'Hashem Eilai	2011	In 2011, Yerachmiel's son Chananya, along with choir graduate Menachem Klein, founded an Israeli branch of MBC. The choir was called 'Miami Mizrach', and the children sang in Hebrew and with an Israeli accent. The choir was not successful and was closed after several years. The next album "Mi Lahashem Aylai ", was released in the summer of 2011. This album was also worked by Moshe Laufer, Yisroel Lamm and Mona Rosenblum . Among the successful songs: 'Shema Yisrael' and 'Mi Lahashem Aylai'. The title song was translated into Hebrew and performed by the Israeli branch of the choir. The album featured vocalists Sruli Rubin, Dovid Pearlman, Binyamin Ravina Abramowitz and Jeremy Herskowitz.
When the Siyum Calls	2012	In 2012, the choir was hosted for the third time at the 'Hasc' 25 show and performed the hit 'Shema Yisrael' there. That same summer, a special music video was produced by the choir called "When The Siyum Calls". The music video garnered hundreds of thousands of views on YouTube. In addition, a compilation album was released that included the choir's nostalgic songs related to Torah study, the title song and the solo song "Modim" which is performed in a duet between the choir's soloist David Perlman and Yerachmiel Begun.
Miami in Concert	2013	On Passover 2013, a huge show was held to mark 36 years of MBC - 'Miami 36'. The show was accompanied by 18 musicians and 18 alumni from the past. 3 new songs were written especially for the show: 'Chai Chai', 'Am Levodod Yishkon' and 'Hakel'. During the show, the alumni of the choir performed a number of songs from the past, when, among others, the stars of the past Isaac Benishai and Daniel Muchnick performed a reconstruction of their iconic solo pieces from the song 'Lo B’ruach Hashem'. Choir graduates Chanina, Akiva and Binyamin Ravina Abramowitz performed the song 'Ani Maamin' (from the album 'It's Min Hashomayim') together with their brother Chiya. In addition, a reconstruction of the musical from Miami Experience 2 was carried out, and a duet was performed between Nochum Stark, who was the main actor in 1992, and his successor Dovid Pearlman.
Ut Ut	2015	The next album was released in 2014 and was called "Ut Ut ". The album was edited by Yerachmiel Begun and Yisroel Lamm. This album was very successful in the United States, but in Israel it was less well known. Among the album's hits: the title song 'Ut Ut' which includes lyrics in Yiddish from the nostalgic song 'Kumt Shoin' and received a new melody; 'B'simcha Rabah' 'Tzur' and 'Kol Kol Kol'. The prominent soloists of the album: Dovid Pearlman, Tzvi Simchon and Michael Weingarten. In the summer of 2014, the choir toured Europe and Israel together with singer Benny Friedman on the occasion of the release of the new album UT UT. The performances were a great success.
Miami B'Simcha Rabah (DVD)	2016	On Chanukkah 2016, a new DVD called "Miami B'simcha Rabah " was released, which included performances by the choir from the Ut Ut album period, the alumni choir, a special clip of the 'Unity Choir' and another song they performed. In addition, 40-minute long behind-the-scenes footage of the choir's concert tour in Antwerp, London, Paris, Israel and Mexico was published.
Miami Le'olam Vo'ed ~ Forever!	2018	In the summer of 2018, the album "Le'olum Vo'ed" was released. In this album, for the first time, a collaboration was created with the producers Yoeli Dikman, Naftali Schnitzler, Avromi Barko, Jan Praitor and Eli Leshinsky, in addition to the veteran processor Yisroel Lamm. A short time later, a 'clip' version of the album's hit 'Esmach' was released. Among the songs of the album that were successful: 'Yevorechecho', 'Dor Dor' and 'Le'olum Vo'ed'. The song 'T'filas Chupah' is performed entirely by the vocalist Eliyahu Levy. Other stars: Elisha and Eli Cohen. This album, like the previous one, failed to stand out too much, and symbolized a decline in the choir's popularity. On Passover 2019, the choir performed with a show centered on a musical called "Save the Day". The musical tells the story of children trying to save their school from closing due to financial difficulties. 5 new songs were written in honor of the show, and in addition to the children of the choir, 2 of its alumni were also presented: Yoshi Bender and Yochonon Burstein. The stars of the show were Elisha Cohen and Mark Rosenstock. The musical was released on DVD in 2020.
We Stand With Israel (Single)	2023	As a response to the October 7 attacks 2023, Begun wrote a song to show the choir's support for Israel. They were accompanied by the Miami Teens. The two soloists were Jack Hidary and Charles Zoltan.
One Voice	2024	In 2024, the Miami boys choir created a new album called "One Voice".
Kuh Rebon	2025	A song made with the Miami Choir Experience for the Shabbos Project
Torah Umitzvos (Single)	2025	
