= Julia Blum =

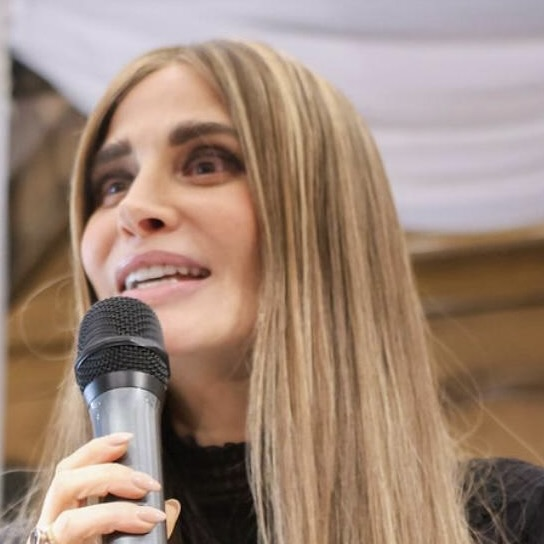
- Blum speaking in 2024

Background information
- Born: Julia Anne Blum; 1967 (age 58–59); Beverly Hills, California, U.S.
- Genres: Jewish music, folk, soul
- Occupations: Singer, songwriter, music producer, actress
- Instruments: Vocals, piano
- Years active: 1990–present

Julia Anne Blum (born 1967, Beverly Hills, California) is an American Orthodox Jewish singer, songwriter, actress, and speaker. A baalat teshuva, Blum studied music and theater at Harvard and Yale and worked with vocal coach Seth Riggs before becoming Orthodox in the late 1980s. She has released two albums, Stand Tall (1990) and Songs of the Heart (1998), and has toured throughout the United States, Canada and overseas.

== Biography ==
=== Early life ===
Blum grew up in Beverly Hills, California. Her mother, Cynthia, is an elementary school teacher, while her father, Frederick, is an insurance executive. During Julia's childhood, the family attended a Conservative synagogue and celebrated the major Jewish holidays, and Julia received a bat mitzvah.

The young Blum took piano and ballet lessons from an early age and began acting and singing professionally at age 12, appearing in commercials and studying under noted voice coach Seth Riggs. She attended Beverly Hills High School, where she won the lead role in virtually every theatre production and performed alongside future successes such as David Schwimmer.

After excelling in high school, Blum was accepted to multiple Ivy League universities, including Princeton, Harvard, and Brown, ultimately studying music, theater, and film at Harvard and Yale. At Yale, she frequently performed leading roles in major productions with the Yale Dramat, the Yale Repertory Theatre, and the Yale School of Drama — an unusual distinction for an undergraduate.

=== Turn to Orthodoxy and career in Jewish music ===
After graduating Cum Laude with Distinction from Yale in 1988, Blum traveled abroad to Europe, Greece, and Israel. In the latter country, Blum, curious about her heritage, studied at an Orthodox women's yeshiva in Jerusalem, where she read biblical Hebrew texts, visited religious families, and kept Shabbat. The experience endeared her to Orthodoxy and inspired her to become a baalat teshuva.

Upon returning to the United States, Blum began writing and performing original music inspired by her newfound faith. She has released two albums, Stand Tall (1990) and Songs of the Heart (1998).

== Artistry ==
Blum has been cited as a role model among Orthodox women. She adheres to the rabbinic prohibition of kol isha by performing only for girls and women.

Blum primarily sings in English with occasional Hebrew verses, including selections from Psalms. She also sings in French on the title song from Songs of the Heart. Her lyrical topics include family relationships ("Hey Little Sister"), her struggles with becoming religious ("Smelling Roses", "Longing for the Longing"), and the temporary nature of fame ("Greatness", "Price You Pay").

Blum has performed at major venues for Orthodox women, including Brooklyn College. After taking many years away from performing to focus on her family, she has resumed her career and begun recording her third album.

== Discography ==
=== Albums ===
- Stand Tall (1990, independent)
- Songs of the Heart (1998, Firefly)
