= Chaim-Dovid Saracik =

Israeli musical artist

Chaim Dovid Saraicik חיים-דוד סרצ'ק
- Also known as: Chaim Dovid
- Genres: Jewish, Kumzits, Shlomo Carlebach
- Instrument: Acoustic Guitar
- Years active: 1995–present

Chaim-Dovid Saracik (Hebrew: חיים-דוד סרצ'ק) is an Orthodox Jewish Chasidish musician who lives in the Old City of Jerusalem. He professionally goes by the name Chaim Dovid. He has produced more than eleven albums and has played for thousands of people in a career spanning decades.

== Background ==
Saracik was born and raised in South Africa and began playing guitar at the age of 11. He was conscripted into the South African military at 17, and made Aliyah at 19. In the 1970s he spent time in Israel volunteering as a gardener on kibbutz Ramat Hakovesh. After his volunteer work in Israel, he traveled to Europe.

Saracik met Rabbi Shlomo Carlebach at a concert in Amsterdam and first performed with him in London a few months later. In 1975 he arrived at the Diaspora Yeshiva in Jerusalem, Israel.

Saracik lives in the Old City of Jerusalem. His parents lived their last years in Australia.

== Musical style ==
Saracik's music is heavily influenced by Shlomo Carlebach and is a regular at the Safed summer klezmer festivals. He is famous for his niggun "Yamamai" and many others.

== Discography ==
- Ohr Chadash (1986)
- Open Up Your Gates (1988)
- Songs for Your Shabbos Table (for Aish Hatorah) (1988)
- Lema'an Shemo ...For the Sake of His Name (1991)
- Hayom ...On This Day (1993)
- Before You - Lefanecha (1998)
- Grateful ... And Alive! (Live from the Carlebach Shul) (1999)
- With the Chassidim (2000)
- Mi'tzur Dvash (2001)
- Ma'aser Rishon (2003)
- First Fruits (compilation of 'Ohr Chadash' & 'Open Up Your Gates') (2004)
- Bnei Baischo - Build Your Home (songs of Eliyahu Hartman) (2005)
- Chaim David and the Good News Bearers (2009)
