= Kumzits =

Hasidic jewish musical gathering

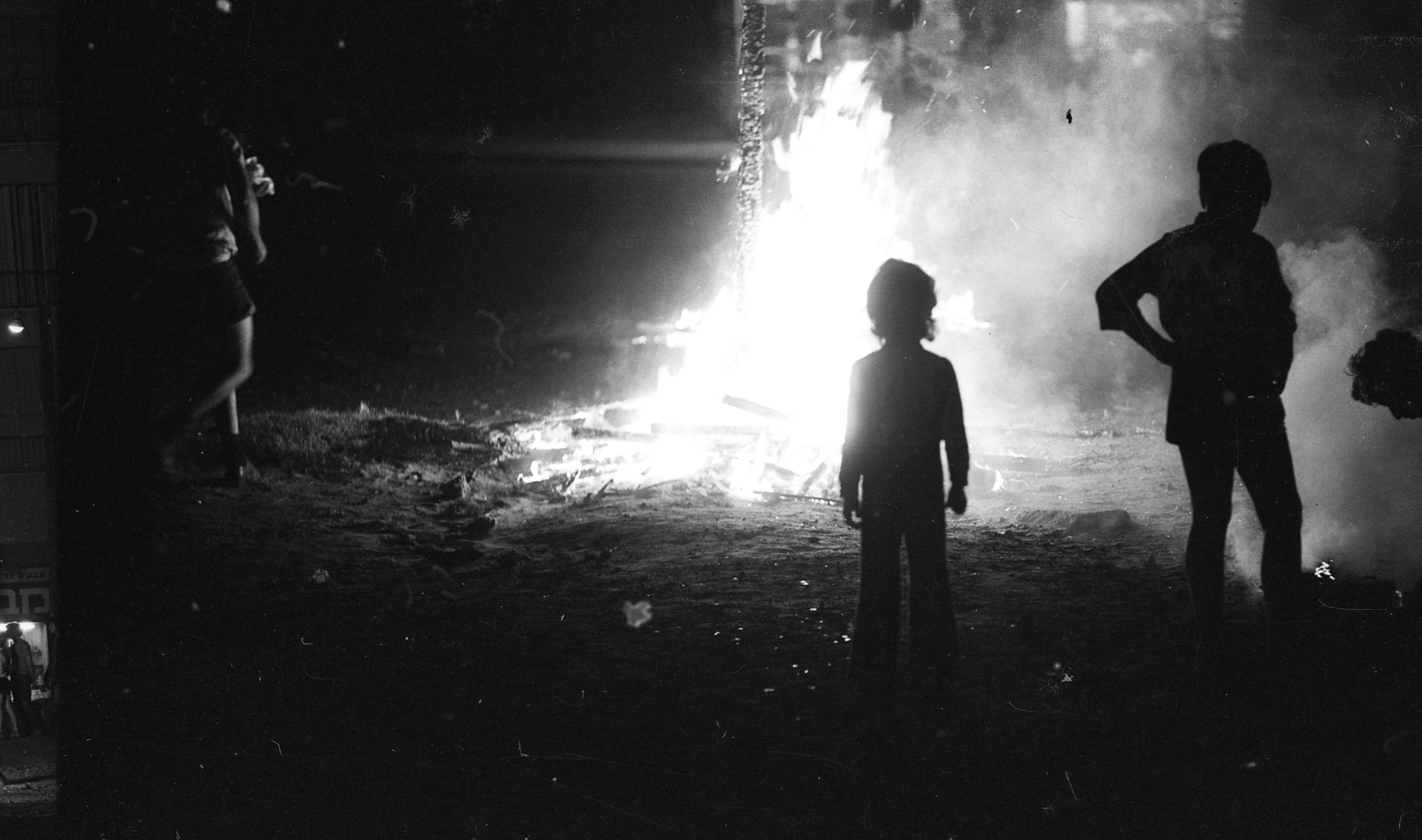
A Lag BaOmer kumzits in Israel, 1972

Kumzits (Yiddish: קומזיץ) is used to describe a musical gathering that Jews partake in. Everyone sits together, be it on the floor or on chairs, and sings spiritually moving songs. To establish a certain ambiance the lighting is often low and candles are primarily used, or if taking place outdoors it is usually around a campfire.

If it is not the Jewish Sabbath then there will usually be musical instruments, such as guitar or violin. An orator will usually tell short inspirational folk-stories between songs.

Among Slonimer Chassidim, a similar gathering is called a "zitzen", which is Yiddish for "sitting", is conducted by the Chassidim after the Rebbe's Tish, without the presence of the Rebbe.

It is a compound word in Yiddish composed of קום (come) and זיץ (sit). Originally the word was coined by the Biluim. Despite the opposition of some who preferred to use the more distinctly Hebrew שב-נא Shev-na "please sit" or Persian/Arabic טוזיג "Tozig" (via the Talmud), the word has stuck and is used mainly by the religious but sometimes also the secular public.

Often, a kumzits will take place after the Sabbath, and as such some erroneously use the term interchangeably with Melava Malka. When a kumzits takes place Friday night, it is often called an "oneg shabbos" (a Hebrew phrase meaning "Sabbath pleasure"). Kumzits are also popular among campers.

Generally, slow, moving songs are sung during a kumzitz. Songs composed by Shlomo Carlebach are very popular, as well as songs by the more recent Jewish singing groups such as Dveykus and Zusha. If the kumzits takes place on Shabbat, songs with a Sabbath theme can be sung. If the kumzits is held on Rosh Chodesh or near the date of another Jewish holiday, songs associated with that holiday can be sung.
