= History of religious Jewish music =

== Temple origins ==
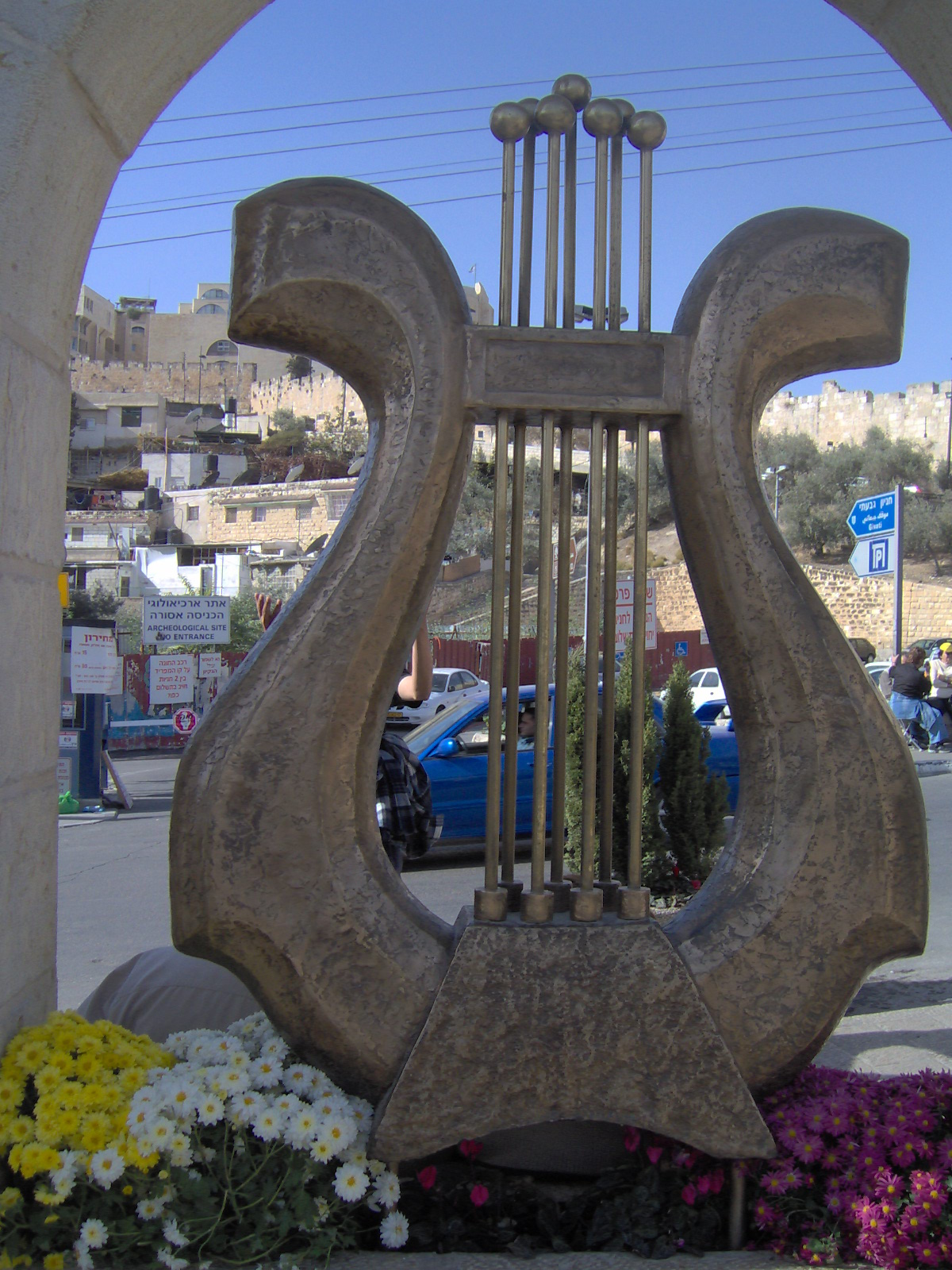
Symbolic model of King David's harp (or lyre) displayed in the City of David, Jerusalem, Israel

The earliest synagogal music was based on the same system as that used in the Temple in Jerusalem. According to the Talmud, Joshua ben Hananiah, who had served in the sanctuary Levitical choir, told how the choristers went to the synagogue from the orchestra by the altar, and so participated in both services.

Biblical and contemporary sources mention the following instruments that were used in the ancient Temple:

- the nevel, a 12-stringed harp
- the kinnor a lyre with 10 strings
- the shofar, a hollowed-out ram's horn
- the chatzutzera, or trumpet, made of silver
- the tof or small drum
- the metziltayim, or cymbals
- the paamon or bell
- the halil, a large flute

According to the Mishna, the regular Temple orchestra consisted of twelve instruments, and the choir of twelve male singers.

A number of additional instruments were known to the ancient Hebrews, though they were not included in the regular orchestra of the Temple: the transl. he – transl. uggav (small flute), the transl. he – transl. abbuv (a reed flute or oboe-like instrument).

After the destruction of the Temple and the subsequent diaspora of the Jewish people, there was a feeling of great loss among the people. At the time, a consensus developed that all music and singing would be banned; this was codified as a rule by some early Jewish rabbinic authorities. However, the ban on singing and music, although not formally lifted by any council, soon became understood as only a ban outside of religious services. Within the synagogue the custom of singing soon re-emerged. In later years, the practice became to allow singing for feasts celebrating religious life-cycle events such as weddings, and over time the formal ban against singing and performing music lost its force altogether, with the exception of the Yemenite Jews. The Jews of Yemen maintained strict adherence to Talmudic and Maimonidean halakha and "instead of developing the playing of musical instruments, they perfected singing and rhythm." (See Yemenite Jewish poetry. For the modern Yemenite-Jewish musical phenomenon, see Yemenite Jewish music.)

It was with the piyyutim (liturgical poems) that Jewish music began to crystallize into definite form. The cantor sang the piyyutim to melodies selected by their writer or by himself, thus introducing fixed melodies into synagogal music. The prayers he continued to recite as he had heard his predecessors recite them; but in moments of inspiration he would give utterance to a phrase of unusual beauty, which, caught up by the congregants.

=== Adaptations from local music ===
The music may have preserved a few phrases in the reading of scripture which recalled songs from the Temple itself; but generally it echoed the tones which the Jew of each age and country heard around him, not merely in the actual borrowing of tunes, but more in the tonality on which the local music was based. These elements persist side by side, rendering the traditional intonations a blend of different sources.

The underlying principle may be the specific allotment in Jewish worship of a particular mode to each sacred occasion, because of some esthetic appropriateness felt to underlie the association. In contrast to the meager modal choice of modern melody, the synagogal tradition revels in the possession of scale-forms preserved from the remote past, much as are to be perceived in the plain-song of the Catholic, the Byzantine, and the Armenian churches, as well as Hungarian, Roma, Persian and Arab sources.

== Cantorial and synagogue music ==
The traditional mode of singing prayers in the synagogue is often known as hazzanut, the art of being a hazzan (cantor). It is a style of florid melodious intonation which requires the exercise of vocal agility. It was introduced into Europe in the 7th century, then rapidly developed.

The age of the various elements in synagogal song may be traced from the order in which the passages of the text were first introduced into the liturgy and were in turn regarded as so important as to demand special vocalization. This order closely agrees with that in which the successive tones and styles still preserved for these elements came into use among the Gentile neighbors of the Jews who utilized them. Earliest of all is the cantillation of the Bible, in which the traditions of the various rites differ only as much and in the same manner from one another as their particular interpretations according to the text and occasion differ among themselves. This indeed was to be anticipated if the differentiation itself preserves a peculiarity of the music of the Temple.

Next comes, from the first ten centuries, and probably taking shape only with the Jewish settlement in western and northern Europe, the cantillation of the Amidah referred to below, which was the first portion of the liturgy dedicated to a musical rendering, all that preceded it remaining unchanted. Gradually the song of the precentor commenced at ever earlier points in the service. By the 10th century, the chant began at Barukh she'amar, the previous custom having been to commence the singing at "Nishmat," these conventions being still traceable in practise in the introit signalizing the entry of the junior and of the senior officiant. Hence, in turn, appeared cantillation, prayer-motive, fixed melody, and hymn as forms of synagogal music.

=== Reminiscences of non-Jewish sacred melody ===
The contemporaneous musical fashion of the outer world has ever found its echo within the walls of the synagogue, so that in the superstructure added by successive generations of transmitting singers there are always discernible points of comparison, even of contact, with the style and structure of each successive era in the musical history of other religious communions. Attention has frequently been drawn to the resemblances in manner and even in some points of detail between the chants of the muezzin and of the reader of the Qur'an with much of the hazzanut, not alone of the Sephardim, who passed so many centuries in Arab lands, but also of the Ashkenazim, equally long located far away in northern Europe.

The intonations of the Sephardim even more intimately recall the plainsong of the Mozarabian Christians, which flourished in their proximity until the 13th century. Their chants and other set melodies largely consist of very short phrases often repeated, just as Perso-Arab melody so often does; and their congregational airs usually preserve a Morisco or other Peninsular character.

The Cantillation reproduces the tonalities and the melodic outlines prevalent in the western world during the first ten centuries of the Diaspora; and the prayer-motives, although their method of employment recalls far more ancient and more Oriental parallels, are equally reminiscent of those characteristic of the eighth to the 13th century of the common era. Many of the phrases introduced in the hazzanut generally, closely resemble the musical expression of the sequences which developed in the Catholic plainsong after the example set by the school famous as that of Notker Balbulus, at St. Gall, in the early 10th century. The earlier formal melodies still more often are paralleled in the festal intonations of the monastic precentors of the eleventh to the 15th century, even as the later synagogal hymns everywhere approximate greatly to the secular music of their day.

The traditional penitential intonation transcribed in the article Ne'ilah with the piyyut "Darkeka" closely reproduces the music of a parallel species of medieval Latin verse, the metrical sequence "Missus Gabriel de Cœlis" by Adam of St. Victor (c. 1150) as given in the Graduale Romanum of Sarum. The mournful chant characteristic of penitential days in all the Jewish rites, is closely recalled by the Church antiphon in the second mode "Da Pacem Domine in Diebus Nostris" ("Vesperale Ratisbon," p. 42). The joyous intonation of the Northern European rite for morning and afternoon prayers on the Three Festivals (Passover, Sukkot and Shavuot) closes with the third tone, third ending of the Gregorian psalmody; and the traditional chant for the Hallel itself, when not the one reminiscent of the "Tonus Peregrinus," closely corresponds with those for Ps. cxiii. and cxvii. ("Laudate Pueri" and "Laudate Dominum") in the "Graduale Romanum" of Ratisbon, for the vespers of June 24, the festival of John the Baptist, in which evening service the famous "Ut Queant Laxis," from which the modern scale derived the names of its degrees, also occurs.

=== Prayer-motives ===
Next to the passages of Scripture recited in cantillation, the most ancient and still the most important section of the Jewish liturgy is the sequence of benedictions which is known as the Amidah ('standing prayer'), being the section which in the ritual of the Dispersion more immediately takes the place of the sacrifice offered in the ritual of the Temple on the corresponding occasion. It accordingly attracts the intonation of the passages which precede and follow it into its own musical rendering. Like the lessons, it, too, is cantillated. This free intonation is not, as with the Scriptural texts, designated by any system of accents, but consists of a melodious development of certain themes or motives traditionally associated with the individual service, and therefore termed here prayer-motives. These are each differentiated from other prayer-motives much as are the respective forms of the cantillation, the divergence being especially marked in the tonality due to the modal feeling alluded to above. Tonality depends on that particular position of the semitones or smaller intervals between two successive degrees of the scale which causes the difference in color familiar to modern ears in the contrast between major and minor melodies.

Throughout the musical history of the synagogue a particular mode or scale-form has long been traditionally associated with a particular service. It appears in its simplest form in the prayer-motive—which is best defined, to use a musical phrase, as a sort of coda—to which the benediction (berakha) closing each paragraph of the prayers is to be chanted. This is associated with a secondary phrase, somewhat after the tendency which led to the framing of the binary form in European classical music. The phrases are amplified and developed according to the length, the structure, and, above all, the sentiment of the text of the paragraph, and lead always into the coda in a manner anticipating the form of instrumental music entitled the rondo, although in no sense an imitation of the modern form. The responses likewise follow the tonality of the prayer-motive.

This intonation is designated by the Hebrew term nigun ('tune') when its melody is primarily in view, by the Yiddish term shteyger ('scale') when its modal peculiarities and tonality are under consideration, and by the Romance word gust and the Slavonic skarbowa when the taste or style of the rendering especially marks it off from other music. The use of these terms, in addition to such less definite Hebraisms as ne'imah ('melody'), shows that the scales and intervals of such prayer-motives have long been recognized and observed to differ characteristically from those of contemporary Gentile music, even if the principles underlying their employment have only quite recently been formulated.

=== Modal difference ===
The modal differences are not always so observable in the Sephardic or Southern tradition. Here the participation of the congregants has tended to a more general uniformity, and has largely reduced the intonation to a chant around the dominant, or fifth degree of the scale, as if it were a derivation from the Ashkenazic daily morning theme (see below), but ending with a descent to the major third. Even where the particular occasion—such as a fast—might call for a change of tonality, the anticipation of the congregational response brings the close of the benediction back to the usual major third. But enough differences remain, especially in the Italian rendering, to show that the principle of parallel rendering with modal difference, fully apparent in their cantillation, underlies the prayer-intonations of the Sephardim also. This principle has marked effects in the Ashkenazic or Northern tradition, where it is as clear in the rendering of the prayers as in that of the Scriptural lessons, and is also apparent in the Ḳerobot.

All the tonalities are distinct. They are formulated in the subjoined tabular statement, in which the various traditional motives of the Ashkenazic ritual have been brought to the same pitch of reciting-note in order to facilitate comparison of their modal differences.

=== Chromatic intervals ===
By ancient tradition, from the days when the Jews who passed the Middle Ages in Teutonic lands were still under the same tonal influences as the peoples in southeastern Europe and Asia Minor yet are, chromatic scales (i.e., those showing some successive intervals greater than two semitones) have been preserved. Shabbat morning and weekday evening motives are especially affected by this survival, which also frequently induces the Polish ḥazzanim to modify similarly the diatonic intervals of the other prayer-motives. The chromatic intervals survive as a relic of the Oriental tendency to divide an ordinary interval of pitch into subintervals (compare Hallel for Sukkot, the "lulab" chant), as a result of the intricacy of some of the vocal embroideries in actual employment, which are not infrequently of a character to daunt an ordinary singer. Even among Western cantors, trained amid mensurate music on a contrapuntal basis, there is still a remarkable propensity to introduce the interval of the augmented second, especially between the third and second degrees of any scale in a descending cadence. Quite commonly two augmented seconds will be employed in the octave, as in the frequent form—much loved by Eastern peoples—termed by Bourgault-Ducoudray ("Mélodies Populaires de Grèce et d'Orient," p. 20, Paris, 1876) "the Oriental chromatic" (see music below).

The harmonia, or manner in which the prayer-motive will be amplified into hazzanut, is measured rather by the custom of the locality and the powers of the officiant than by the importance of the celebration. The precentor will accommodate the motive to the structure of the sentence he is reciting by the judicious use of the reciting-note, varied by melismatic ornament. In the development of the subject he is bound to no definite form, rhythm, manner, or point of detail, but may treat it quite freely according to his personal capacity, inclination, and sentiment, so long only as the conclusion of the passage and the short doxology closing it, if it ends in a benediction, are chanted to the snatch of melody forming the coda, usually distinctly fixed and so furnishing the modal motive. The various sections of the melodious improvisation will thus lead smoothly back to the original subject, and so work up to a symmetrical and clear conclusion. The prayer-motives, being themselves definite in tune and well recognized in tradition, preserve the homogeneity of the service through the innumerable variations induced by impulse or intention, by energy or fatigue, by gladness or depression, and by every other mental and physical sensation of the precentor which can affect his artistic feeling (see table).

== Occasions ==
The development of music among the Israelites was coincident with that of poetry, the two being equally ancient, since every poem was also sung. Although little mention is made of it, music was used in very early times in connection with divine service. Amos 6:5 and Isaiah 5:12 show that the feasts immediately following sacrifices were very often attended with music, and from Amos 5:23 it may be gathered that songs had already become a part of the regular service. Moreover, popular festivals of all kinds were celebrated with singing and music, usually accompanying dances in which, as a rule, women and maidens joined. Victorious generals were welcomed with music on their return, and music naturally accompanied the dances at harvest festivals and at the accession of kings or their marriages. Family festivals of different kinds were celebrated with music. I Samuel 16:18 indicates that the shepherd cheered his loneliness with his reed-pipe, and Lamentations 5:14 shows that youths coming together at the gates entertained one another with stringed instruments. David by his playing on the harp drove away an evil spirit from Saul; the holy ecstasy of the Prophets was stimulated by dancing and music; playing on a harp awoke the inspiration that came to Elisha. The description in Chronicles of the embellishment by David of the Temple service with a rich musical liturgy represents in essence the order of the Second Temple, since, as is now generally admitted, the liturgical Temple Psalms belong to the post-exilic period.

The importance which music attained in the later exilic period is shown by the fact that in the original writings of Ezra and Nehemiah a distinction is still drawn between the singers and the Levites (comp. Ezra 2:41,70; 7:7,24; 10:23; Nehemiah 7:44, 73; 10:29,40; etc.); whereas in the parts of the books of Ezra and Nehemiah belonging to the Chronicles singers are reckoned among the Levites (compare Ezra 3:10; Nehemiah 11:22; 12:8,24,27; I Chronicles 6:16). In later times singers even received a priestly position, since Agrippa II. gave them permission to wear the white priestly garment.(comp. Josephus, "Antiquities" 20:9, § 6). The detailed statements of the Talmud show that the service became ever more richly embellished.

== Singing in the Temple ==
Unfortunately few definite statements can be made concerning the kind and the degree of the artistic development of music and psalm-singing. Only so much seems certain, that the folk-music of older times was replaced by professional music, which was learned by the families of singers who officiated in the Temple. The participation of the congregation in the Temple song was limited to certain responses, such as "Amen" or "Halleluiah," or formulas like "Since His mercy endureth forever," etc. As in the old folk-songs, antiphonal singing, or the singing of choirs in response to each other, was a feature of the Temple service. At the dedication of the walls of Jerusalem, Nehemiah formed the Levitical singers into two large choruses, which, after having marched around the city walls in different directions, stood opposite each other at the Temple and sang alternate hymns of praise to God (Nehemiah 12:31). Niebuhr ("Reisen," i. 176) calls attention to the fact that in the Orient it is still the custom for a precentor to sing one strophe, which is repeated three, four, or five tones lower by the other singers. In this connection mention may be made of the alternating song of the seraphim in the Temple, when called upon by Isaiah (comp. Isa. vi.). The measure must have varied according to the character of the song; and it is not improbable that it changed even in the same song. Without doubt the striking of the cymbals marked the measure.

Ancient Hebrew music, like much Arabic music today, was probably monophonic; that is, there is no harmony. Niebuhr refers to the fact that when Arabs play on different instruments and sing at the same time, almost the same melody is heard from all, unless one of them sings or plays as bass one and the same note throughout. It was probably the same with the Israelites in olden times, who attuned the stringed instruments to the voices of the singers either on the same note or in the octave or at some other consonant interval. This explains the remark in II Chronicles 5:13 that at the dedication of the Temple the playing of the instruments, the singing of the Psalms, and the blare of the trumpets sounded as one sound. Probably the unison of the singing of Psalms was the accord of two voices an octave apart. This may explain the terms al alamot and al ha-sheminit. On account of the important part which women from the earliest times took in singing, it is comprehensible that the higher pitch was simply called the maiden's key, and ha-sheminit would then be an octave lower.

There is no question that melodies repeated in each strophe, in the modern manner, were not sung at either the earlier or the later periods of psalm-singing; since no such thing as regular strophes occurred in Hebrew poetry. In fact, in the earlier times there were no strophes at all; and although they are found later, they are by no means so regular as in modern poetry. Melody, therefore, must then have had comparatively great freedom and elasticity and must have been like the Oriental melody of today. As Niebuhr points out, the melodies are earnest and simple, and the singers must make every word intelligible. A comparison has often been made with the eight notes of the Gregorian chant or with the Oriental psalmody introduced into the church of Milan by Ambrosius: the latter, however, was certainly developed under the influence of Grecian music, although in origin it may have had some connection with the ancient synagogal psalm-singing, as Delitzsch claims that it was ("Psalmen," 3d ed., p. 27).

== Contemporary Jewish religious music ==
Jewish Music in the 20th century has spanned the gamut from Shlomo Carlebach's nigunim to Debbie Friedman's Jewish feminist folk, and includes through-composed settings of the Avodath Hakodesh ('Sacred Service') by such composers as Ernest Bloch, Darius Milhaud, and Marc Lavry. Velvel Pasternak has spent much of the late 20th century acting as a preservationist and committing what had been a strongly oral tradition to paper. John Zorn's record label, Tzadik, features a "Radical Jewish Culture" series that focuses on exploring what contemporary Jewish music is and what it offers to contemporary Jewish culture.

Periodically Jewish music jumps into mainstream consciousness, Matisyahu (musician) being the most recent example.

=== Example ===
One type of music, based on Shlomo Carlebach's, is very popular among Orthodox artists and their listeners. This type of music usually consists of the same formulaic mix. This mix is usually brass, horns and strings. These songs are composed from within one pool of composers and one pool of arrangers. Many of the entertainers are former yeshiva students, and perform dressed in a dress suit. Many have day jobs and sideline singing at Jewish weddings. Others moonlight in kollel study or at Jewish organizations. Some have no formal musical education, and sing mainly pre-arranged songs.

Lyrics are most commonly short passages in Hebrew from the Torah or the siddur, with the occasional obscure passage from the Talmud. Sometimes there are songs with lyrics compiled in English in more standard form, with central themes such as Jerusalem, the Holocaust, Jewish identity, and the Jewish diaspora.

Some composers are Yossi Green; a big-name arranger of this type of music is Yisroel Lamm. Artists include Avraham Fried, Dedi Graucher, Lipa Schmeltzer, Mordechai Ben David, Shloime Dachs, Shloime Gertner, and Yaakov Shwekey.

=== Contemporary music for children ===
Some Orthodox Jews believe that secular music contains messages that are incompatible with Judaism. Parents may choose to limit their children's exposure to music produced by those other than Orthodox Jews, so that they are less likely to become influenced by many of the more, in the parents' eyes, harmful outside ideas and fashions.

A large body of music produced by Orthodox Jews for children is geared toward teaching religious and ethical traditions and laws. The lyrics of these songs are generally English with some Hebrew or Yiddish phrases. Country Yossi, Abie Rotenberg, and Uncle Moishy are examples of Orthodox Jewish musicians/entertainers whose music teach children Orthodox traditions.

== See also ==
- Zemirot
- Piyyut
- Synagogal Music
- Gregorian chant
- Nigun

== Bibliography ==
; citing:

- Saalschütz, Gesch. und Würdigung der Musik bei den Alten Hebräern, 1829;
- Delitzsch, Physiologie und Musik, 1868;
- Forkel, All-gemeine Gesch. der Musik. i. 173 et seq. and the bibliography there given.E. G. H.
