= Shlomo Simcha =

Contemporary Jewish Singer

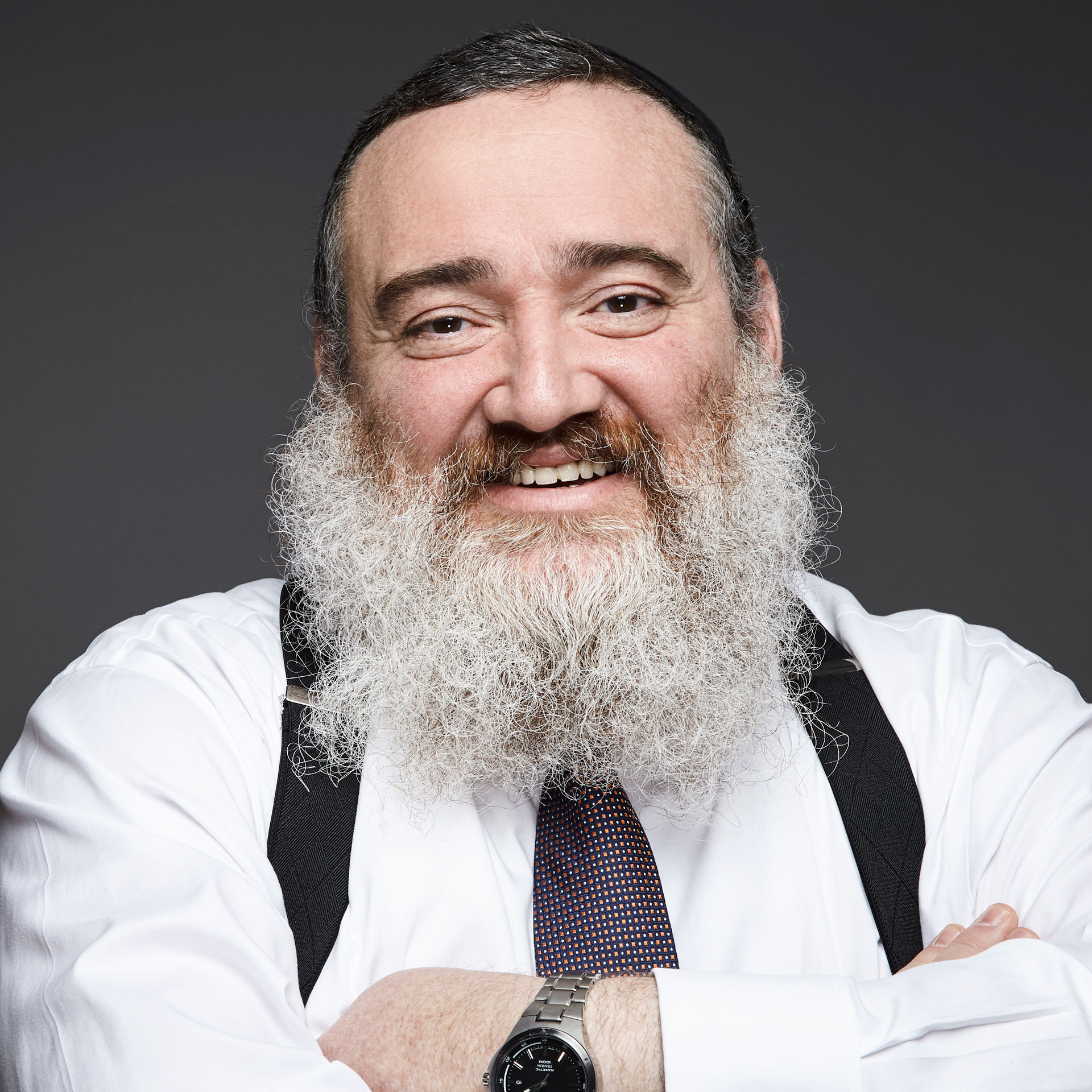

Background information
- Born: Manchester, United Kingdom
- Genres: Jewish music, Contemporary Jewish religious, Religious Jewish music
- Occupations: Jewish cantor, Jewish singer
- Instrument: Vocals
- Years active: 1983–present
- Labels: Sheya Mendlowitz Productions, Aderet Records, Sameach Music, M & M Enterprises, HASC, Doni Gross Productions
- Website: https://www.shlomosimcha.com

Shlomo Simcha Sufrin, better known as Shlomo Simcha (Hebrew: שלמה שמחה) is a UK-born Canadian Hasidic Jewish cantor and singer. Shlomo Simcha began his career in a small kollel in Montreal, where he was discovered by a local wedding band leader who brought him onto a project recording a series for children in the Satmar community called Besof Umachol. His work on the series caught the attention of Mendy Werdyger at Aderet Records, who introduced him to producer Sheya Mendlowitz, with whom he would create his first commercial album.

In 1992, Shlomo Simcha found himself flying to Israel to perform on stage with Mordechai Ben David at a concert in Yad Eliyahu, Tel Aviv during the holiday of Sukkot – his first major exposure to audiences and other names in the world of Jewish music. That exposure led to the first of many invitations to perform at the annual A Time for Music benefit concert, in support of the Jewish non-profit agency HASC, and the beginning of his relationship with composer and musical artist Abie Rotenberg, with whom he would create the popular Aish music series.

Since the start of his career, Shlomo Simcha has released seven solo albums and collaborated or been featured on over 20 albums, with artists, arrangers, and composers like Benny Friedman, Nafshenu Orchestra, Yossi Green, Moshe Laufer, Suki Berry / Suki & Ding, Yisroel Lamm (the Neginah Orchestra), and more. He regularly performs at benefit concerts and Jewish community events across North America, the UK and Israel, as well as private and corporate functions.

== Personal life ==
Shlomo Simcha was born in Manchester, United Kingdom, to Rabbi Mordechai Tzvi and Mrs. Frayda Sufrin. He is a great-grandchild of Rabbi Eliyahu Lopian, and one of 14 children. He grew up in the Hampstead Garden Suburb and Temple Fortune neighbourhoods of London where he was influenced by the prayer styles of his own father, as well as Nathan (Bobby) Vogel, and Cantor Herschel Gorman.

Following his family's move to Temple Fortune, Shlomo Simcha became obsessed with professional singing, and sought to join the London School of Jewish Song (a London-based Jewish choir led by composer and musical artist Yigal Calek). While he has said his family would not be able to manage the time commitment necessary for Shlomo to be in the choir, he was allowed to sit in on rehearsals, and he made a point to seat himself at the same table as Yigal Calek at their synagogue's Friday evening services every week.

== Career ==
In 1989, Shlomo Simcha entered his first professional position as Sexton and Assistant Cantor at the Tifereth Beth David Jerusalem Synagogue in Cote St Luc, Montreal. He remained there until 1993, when he moved to Toronto, Ontario after receiving an offer for the position of Lead Cantor from Shaarei Shomayim Congregation, working alongside Cantor Yaakov Motzen. Shlomo retained that position until 2005, after which he became the Cantor at the Torath Emeth Congregation, a role he held until 2019. During and beyond his time as a cantor, Shlomo Simcha worked to build up his career as a solo and collaborative artist, beginning with his 1993 debut album, That Special Melody, under Aderet Records.

While Shlomo Simcha's career as a solo artist officially began with the release of his first album in 1993, his first experience in studio was singing on the Besof Umachol series for the Satmar community in 1990, recorded at the home studio of the head of the Montreal wedding band. In 1992, Mendy Werdyger of Aderet Records heard the tape while in a store in Williamsburg, Brooklyn and contacted Shlomo Simcha directly to inquire about making an album. During his initial meeting at Aderet in New York, Werdyger introduced Shlomo Simcha to Sheya Mendlowitz, producer of the HASC: A Time for Music series, and informed him that they wanted to record a series of albums together. Soon after, Werdyger's brother, singer Mordechai Ben David, invited Shlomo Simcha to travel with him to Israel to perform at a concert for the holiday of Sukkot, and the two performed together on stage, introducing Shlomo Simcha to Ben David's fan base.

Not long after, Shlomo Simcha would receive the first of what would be many invitations to perform at the annual HASC: A Time for Music benefit concert, where he would eventually meet long-time friend and collaborator Abie Rotenberg, with whom he would go on to create the Aish series. Since the beginning of his career as a recording artist, between solo, collaborative and featured work, Shlomo Simcha has sung on over 40 full-length albums.

Shlomo Simcha moved from Toronto to Boca Raton, Florida in 2021.

== Discography ==
=== Solo albums ===
Year	Album title	Label
1993	That Special Melody	Sheya Mendlowitz Productions
1995	Simchas Yom Tov	Sheya Mendlowitz Productions
1995	Tehilim	Sheya Mendlowitz Productions
1999	Aneini	Self-Published
2000	Made in Canada (Released internationally as Siman Tov)	Suki & Ding
2001	Shabbos with Shlomo Simcha – Nusach Ashkenaz	Aderet Records
2001	Shabbos with Shlomo Simcha – Nusach Sephard	Aderet Records
2004	Hamenagen	Sameach Music
2006	Miracles	Aderet Records
2016	Ani Kan	Doni Gross Productions
2026	Brachot Ve'Ichulim	Eli Dolinsky Productions

=== Aish series ===
Year	Album title	Label
1997	Aish Volume 1	Aderet Records
2003	Aish Volume 2	Aderet Records
2020	Aish Volume 3	Doni Gross Productions

=== Collaborations and featured ===
Year	Artist	Album title	Label
1990	Shlomo Itzkowitz	Besof Umachol	Satmar
1993	HASC	A Time for Music VI	Sheya Mendlowitz Productions
1993	Various Artists	The Bentching Tape	Sheya Mendlowitz Productions
1994	Gideon Levine	The Best of the Best	GYL Productions
1995	Various Artists	Solid Gold Volume 1	Solid Gold Music
1996	Suki & Ding	Zemiros 2	Suki & Ding Productions
1997	Various Artists	Solid Gold Volume 2	Solid Gold Music
1999	Various Artists	Solid Gold Volume 3	Solid Gold Music
1999	Yerachmiel Begun & The Miami Boys Choir	Yachad – Where the Stars Come Together	Yerachmiel Begun & The Miami Boys Choir
2000	Various Artists	All-Star Collection	Sameach Music
2002	Gideon Levine	The Best of the Best 2	GYL Productions
2002	HASC	A Time for Music XV: United We Stand	Sheya Mendlowitz Productions
2003	Various Artists	Sameach at the Wheel	Sameach Music
2004	Various Artists	Solid Dance	Solid Gold Music
2004	Neshoma Orchestra	Neshama Yeseirah – A Heimishe Simcha	Sameach Music
2005	HASC	A Time for Music XVIII	Sheya Mendlowitz Productions
2005	Various Artists	Sameach at the Wheel 2	Sameach Music
2006	Suki & Ding	All Star Collection	Suki & Ding Productions
2006	Various Artists	Hallel 2	Gal Paz
2006	Nafshenu Orchestra	Chai Lifeline Presents Nafshenu Orchestra Featuring Shlomo Simcha	Sheya Mendlowitz Productions
2007	Various Artists	Harei Yehudah	M&M Enterprises
2011	Nafshenu Orchestra	The Wedding of the Century	Aaron Appelbaum Productions
2013	Nafshenu Orchestra	Fusion	
2014	Benny Friedman	With All My Soul – Kol Haneshama Sheli	Benny's Music
2014	Various Artists	The Power of Amein	Aaron Teitelbaum Productions
2015	Various Artists	The Lost Treasure	Shimmy Shtauber
2015	Doni Gross	A Kumzitz in the Rain Vol. 2	Doni Gross Productions
2016	Tzvi Silberstein	Voice of the Stars – Kol HaKochavim	Doni Gross Productions
2016	Pinchas Wolf	Shirei Pinchas Volume 1	Nigun Music
2017	Pinchas Wolf	Shirei Pinchas Volume 2	MRM
2017	Pinchas Wolf	Shirei Pinchas Volume 3	Shiray Pinchas LLC
2017	Doni Gross	A Kumzitz in the Rain Vol. 3 (Junior)	Doni Gross Productions
2017	Shades of Green	Leil Shishi	Doni Gross Productions
2017	Chabad with Moshe Laufer	Leil Shishi	Levik T.
2019	Pinchas Wolf	Shirei Pinchas Volume 4	Shiray Pinchas LLC
2019	Doni Gross	A Kumzitz in the Rain Vol. 4 (Junior)	Doni Gross Productions
2020	Benny Friedman	Whispers of the Heart	Doni Gross Productions
2022	Journeys	Volume 5	Doni Gross Productions
