= HASC =

HASC may refer to:

- Hebrew Academy for Special Children, in New York City
  - HASC Concert, an annual Jewish music concert which is a fundraiser for Camp HASC
- Hierarchical administrative subdivision codes, codes to represent names of country subdivisions, such as states, province, regions
- Hindustan Aeronautics Limited S.C. (Hindustan Aeronautics Sporting Club) a football team in India
- Home Affairs Select Committee, a Committee of the House of Commons in the Parliament of the United Kingdom
- House Armed Services Committee, a standing committee of the United States House of Representatives
