= Benny Friedman (singer) =

American Jewish singer (born 1984)

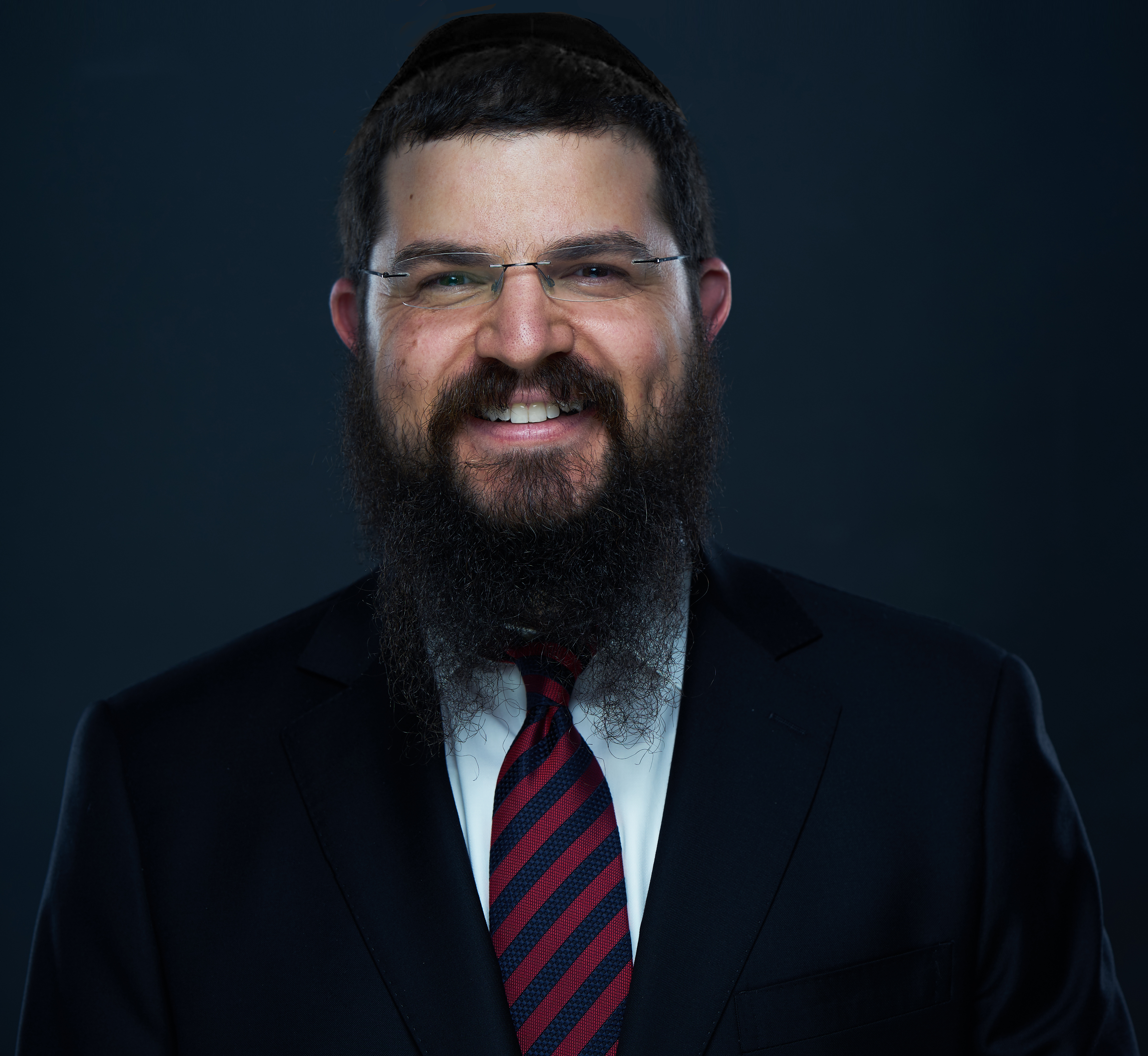
- Friedman in 2018

Background information
- Born: December 3, 1984 (age 41); St. Paul, Minnesota, U.S.
- Genres: Orthodox pop
- Occupation: Singer
- Years active: 2009–present
- Spouse: Chanale Gopin (m. 2009)
- Website: bennysmusic.com

Benzion Hakohen "Benny" Friedman (Hebrew: בנציון הכהן פרידמן; born December 3, 1984) is an American Hasidic Jewish singer and non-pulpit rabbi. Professionally trained in voice, he rose to prominence on the Orthodox pop scene with his first album in 2009. Singing mainly in Hebrew, Friedman tours extensively and also appears in music videos. He views his music as a shlichus (outreach) tool, with the goal of drawing Jews closer to Judaism.

== Early life and family ==
Friedman was born in St. Paul, Minnesota, where his father, Rabbi Manis Friedman, was a Chabad shaliach. He is one of fourteen children. His uncle (his father's brother) is Orthodox Jewish singing star Avraham Fried; he is also the first-cousin of Shmuel and Bentzi Marcus (sons of his father's sister Ita) of the band 8th Day.

At the age of twelve he was sent to learn at the Lubavitcher yeshiva in Postville, Iowa, where he boarded in the home of Rabbi Sholom Rubashkin. At age 15 he traveled to Israel to study in the Lubavitcher yeshiva in Safed. He earned rabbinic ordination and worked as a Chabad shaliach in Tucson, Arizona for several years.

He married Chanale Gopin on June 4, 2009, and resides in Crown Heights, Brooklyn.

== Music career ==
As a child, Friedman enjoyed singing at the family Shabbat table and listening to the CDs of his uncle, Avraham Fried, Mordechai Ben David, and Moshe Yess. He was also comfortable performing in front of audiences. After his bar mitzvah he began performing in Orthodox Jewish summer camps in the Catskill Mountains; later he gave concerts in the U.S., Europe, and Israel during his vacations from yeshiva.

Before his marriage, Friedman trained for four years with voice coach Seth Riggs in California. During that time, he created a show called "Judaism: The Song and the Story", which toured the West Coast for several years running.

Friedman came to national attention with the release of his first solo album, Taamu, produced by Avi Newmark along with Technical Producer Sruly Meyer, in 2009, just after he married. Afterward he began touring in concert and singing at Jewish weddings. He was the vocalist on the 2011 album Nagila V'Nismicha, singing with the Nagilah Orchestra.

His second solo album, Yesh Tikvah: Dawn of Moshiach (2012), also produced by Newmark, along with Technical Producer, Sruly Meyer, made a splash in the Orthodox Jewish world with its title track, "Yesh Tikvah". The Hebrew-language song encouraging hope and faith was co-written by Ari Goldwag and Miriam Israeli. The song earned a mention in an editorial in the Yated Ne'eman Orthodox Jewish newspaper, a paper not known for music reviews. "Yesh Tikvah" has been covered by numerous major Orthodox Jewish singers and choirs and was rendered into Yiddish by the Yedidim Choir.

In 2013, Friedman released his first spinoff album B'nei Heichala: A Shabbos with Benny Friedman, which includes traditional and modern Shabbat zemirot.

He released his third solo album, Kol Haneshama Sheli, in 2014 and his fourth, Fill The World With Light – which included thirteen original songs – in 2016.

In 2019, he released Kulanu Nelech – a studio album featuring 13 tracks. The music was executive produced by Benny Friedman and written by a wide range of composers, including: Ari Goldwag, Udi Damari, Moshe and Yitzy Waldner. Three tracks were recorded live with the Budapest Art Orchestra of Hungary, and included orchestral arrangements by Frederic Bernard, Gershon Freishtat and Elchanan Elchadad. The album's songs marked a shift from his previous more traditional songs based on words from the Hebrew Bible to more universal Hebrew lyrics.

In 2020, he released his first a cappella album, Whispers of the Heart. The album was conceived and recorded over one week, during the COVID-19 pandemic. The following year he released a follow-up album Whispers of the Heart 2. Whispers of the Heart 3 was released two years later with a fourth addition in the form of an EP, Whispers of a Broken Heart released in 2026.

His sixth solo album after a six-year break, Be Gebentched!, was released in August 2025 and was produced by Doni Gross. They had started working on it in 2021, and it included thirteen songs. As well as the expected funk, it includes songs with different styles such as boogie-woogie.

== Benefit performances ==
Friedman has performed on three fund-raising singles: "Chasoif", a free download supporting the rebuilding of the Chabad house damaged in the 2008 Mumbai attacks, and families of the victims; "Unity", a production by 30 top Orthodox Jewish performers to benefit the legal defense of Sholom Rubashkin; and "Berachamim", whose proceeds were earmarked for the medical expenses of Ilan Tocker, a Cedarhurst man who suffered a traumatic brain injury. In 2014 Friedman sang on the album Shir (Song), a collection of 18 songs composed by Shlomo Rechnitz and performed by the leading musical artists in the Orthodox Jewish world. The artists all donated their talents, and proceeds from album sales will benefit the Keren Hashviis Fund, which supports Israeli farmers keeping the laws of Shmita.

Friedman was a headliner at HASC 24, "A Time for Duets" (2011), singing both solo and in duets with his uncle, Avraham Fried; as well as six HASC concerts since.

Friedman frequently performs at Chabad events. In 2009 he was the guest vocalist at the first anniversary memorial for the Chabad shluchim murdered in the 2008 Mumbai attacks. In 2013 he sang for both adults and youth at the annual Kinus HaShluchim Conference in New York City. In December 2013 he sang the national anthem of the US at the first Jewish Heritage Night at a Brooklyn Nets game.

In 2014 he performed at a Chasdei Soul II Soul concert to benefit special-needs students in Crown Heights.

Friedman launched his "Am Yisrael Chai" global concert tour in January 2024 to promote Jewish unity and solidarity during the Gaza war.

== Musical style ==
Friedman's music is categorized as pop Jewish music. He mainly sings in Hebrew, as well as in English.

== Music videos ==
Friedman appears in music videos to promote his songs. The 2012 "Yesh Tikvah" music video has him singing against a nighttime cityscape and then moving to a sunny field to the accompaniment of a chorus of children. In the 2013 music video for "Maaleh Ani", Friedman sings by the Malibu, California coastline while a guitarist, bass guitarist, and drummer play underwater in a swimming pool. Friedman eventually jumps into the pool fully clothed in his trademark black dress suit, white shirt, and tie – clapping, drumming, and playing air guitar with the band. In his 2022 music video "Yama", he appears to run through Israel from coast to coast.

== Discography ==
=== Solo albums ===
- Taamu (2009)
- Yesh Tikvah – Dawn of Moshiach (2012)
- Kol Haneshama Sheli – With All My Soul (2014)
- Fill The World With Light (2016)
- Kulanu Nelech (2019)
- Be Gebentched! (2025)

=== Spinoffs ===
- Nagila V'Nismicha with the Nagilah Orchestra (2011)
- B'nei Heichala – A Shabbos with Benny Friedman (2013)
- Whispers of the Heart – A Cappella Inspiration for Sefira & The 3 Weeks (2020)
- Whispers of the Heart 2 – A Cappella Inspiration for Sefira & The 3 Weeks (2021)
- It Sounds Like Purim (2022)
- It Sounds Like Chanukah (2022)
- Whispers of the Heart 3 – A Cappella Inspiration for Sefira & The 3 Weeks (2023)
- Am Yisrael Chai (2023)

=== Singles ===
- Chasoif - with Yitzy Spinner and Yisroel Werdyger (2008)
- Berachamim - with Ari Goldwag (2010) (also featured on Yesh Tikvah)
- Mi Shemaamin (2011)
- Light One Candle (2013)
- Kulam Sharim (2016) (also featured on Fill The World With Light)
- B'sefer Chaim (2016) (also featured on Fill The World With Light)
- V'haarev Na - with Baruch Levine (2018)
- Lichtig un Varem (2018)
- Vesechezena (2018)
- No Time Like Now (2018)
- My Dear Rebbe - with Yitzy Waldner (2019)
- Hareini Mekabel (2019) (also featured on Kulanu Nelech)
- Vzakeini - with Baruch Levine (2020)
- B'Shir - with Sruly Green (2020)
- Ich Bin Dans - with Dovy Meisels (2020)
- 25,000 Candles (2021)
- We May All Be Different - with Joey Newcomb (2021)
- A Yid (2021)
- It's a Rebbe's Life (2021)
- Thank You Rebbi - with Yitzy Waldner (2021)
- Stand Up For Our Morahs (2021)
- Hold On Tight - with Baruch Levine (2022)
- Dear Am Yisroel (2022)
- YAMA (2022)
- Emunah, Bitachon, Geulah (2022)
- Our Children are our Mission - with Shloime Gertner (2022)
- Tu Tu Tu (2023)
- Vshavu Banim - with Baruch Levine (2023)
- We Are With You (2023)
- Rebbi - It's All From You! (2023)
- Lo Lefached (2023)
- Am Yisroel Chai Mashup - with Moshe Tischler (2024)
- Bein Kochavim - with Moshe Klein (2024)
- Nissim Geluyim (2024)
- Thinkin' About Thankin' (2024)
- Nothing Holding You Back (2024)
- I Have A Little Dreidel Dream (2024)

=== Guest appearances ===
- HASC 24 - A Time For Duets (HASC), 2011 ("Avraham Fried & Benny Friedman Medley")
- The Music We Love (Ohel Concert), 2012 ("Taamu", "Yavducha", "One Day")
- Kumzing 2 (Hamenganim Orchestra), 2012 ("No Lyrics", "Letova", "Kad Yasvun")
- Simchas Hachaim 2 (Aderet Music), 2013 ("Chabad Medley")
- The Yess Legacy (tribute to Moshe Yess), 2013 ("As A Jew")
- Believe (Six13), 2013 ("Yesh Tikvah")
- Chai (The Chevra), 2013 ("Ad Olam" - with Yeshiva Boys Choir)
- HASC 26 (HASC), 2013 ("Family Medley")
- Am Echad (Ari Goldwag), 2013 ("Min Hameitzar")
- Simchas Hachaim 3 (Aderet Music), 2014 ("Nodeh Leshimacha", "Zeh Hayom", "Niggun Karlin", "Ashrei Mi")
- One Day More (Maccabeats), 2014 ("Yesh Tikvah")
- A Cappella Soul 2 (Ari Goldwag), 2014 ("Min Hameitzar")
- Shir (Shlomo Rechnitz), 2014 ("Hinei Hinei")
- HASC 27 (HASC), 2014 ("Dreams Come True", "Shalom Aleichem", "Hashem Melech")
- 2nd Dance II (The A Team), 2014 ("Melech Malchei Hamlachim")
- Simchas Hachaim 4 (Aderet Music), 2015 ("Batorah", "Hareini Mizamen", "Nigun Avod", "Habet Na", "Ze Ho'ois")
- Simchas Hachaim 5 (Aderet Music), 2016 ("Ani Maamin", "Nishmas", "Nigun Chabad", "Teka Teka", "Uvenei")
- A Cappella Soul 3 (Ari Goldwag), 2016 ("Lehisaneg")
- Shirei Pinchas (Reb Pinchas Wolf), 2016 ("Torah Tziva", "Hashomayim")
- The Rebbe's Nigunim (DVD) (Tashbar Media), 2016 ("Asader LeSeudoso")
- Neemos Hachaim (Aderet Music), 2016
- Heart Beats (Mishpacha Magazine), 2016
- Shir 2 (Shlomo Rechnitz), 2016 ("B'chayachon")
- Simchas Hachaim 7 (Aderet Music), 2016
- Storm the World (Ruvi New), 2017 ("The Night A Soul Was Saved")
- Uncle Moishy Volume 19 (Uncle Moishy and the Mitzvah Men), 2018 ("A Holiday")
- Matana Tova (Shlomo Rechnitz), 2018 ("Motzi Asirim")
- The Great Farby (Chony Milecki), 2018 ("It's Late", "Want You")
- Ashrecha (Eitan Katz), 2018 ("B'Fi Yeshorim")
- The Fingerprint Album (Sruli Bodansky), 2019 ("Ki Yaakov")
- Lev El Hanishomah (Cheskie Wiesz), 2019 ("Shira")
- Aish 3 (Abie Rotenberg & Shlomo Simcha), 2020 ("Rachamana")
- How Aw Ya Reb Yid? (Joey Newcomb), 2020 ("Mi K'amcha Yisrael")
- Off the Record (Baruch Levine), 2020
- Emes (New York Boys Choir), 2020 ("Vzakeini")
- Shir 3 (Shlomo Rechnitz), 2021 ("I'm Eshkachech")
- Shema B'ni (Tzvi Silberstein), 2021 ("Poseach")
- Taher Libi (Naftali Kalfa), 2021 ("Yehudi Yakar")
- Tzama 6 (Tzama), 2022 ("Nigun Simcha")
- Journeys 5 (Abie Rotenberg), 2022 ("Chaverim Kol Yisrael")
- Miracles 3 (Chayala Neuhaus), 2022 ("Odeh Lakel")
- Freilach All The Time (Joey Newcomb), 2025("Freilach All The Time")
