= HASC Concert =

Jewish music concert

- The logo of A Time for Music 38
- Frequency: annually
- Country: United States
- Years active: 39
- Inaugurated: January 17, 1988; 38 years ago
- Founder: Sheya Mendlowitz
- Most recent: January 18, 2026
- Next event: January 2027
- Attendance: 3,000
- Ticket price: avg. $500
- Website: hascconcert.com

The HASC Concert, officially A Time for Music, is an annual concert benefiting Camp HASC, a summer camp for children with special needs. Established in 1988, the concert is a prominent event within the Jewish music community.

== History ==
Camp HASC was established in 1963 by Rabbi Max and Blanche Kahn. It offers therapeutic, medical, and educational services to its campers. It offers a combination of academic and recreational activities, supported by a team of staff and medical professionals.

The inaugural HASC concert took place on January 17, 1988. Sheya Mendlowitz conceived the concert after visiting Camp HASC in the 1980s and learning about the camp's financial difficulties. The first concert was held at the Lincoln Center. The concert has been held annually since and has become a significant fundraising event for the camp.

== Format ==
The concert takes place in January and features a lineup of Jewish musical artists. Past performers have included Avraham Fried, Mordechai Ben David, Yaakov Shwekey, and Benny Friedman. The performers are typically not announced in advance.

The concert is typically held at venues such as Lincoln Center, Madison Square Garden, and the New Jersey Performing Arts Center. The program includes musical performances, duets, and sometimes theatrical presentations.

The concerts were previously released on DVD. Starting with A Time For Music 31, a livestream was offered instead of a DVD release.

== Production ==
Sheya Mendlowitz produced the concert for majority of its first eighteen years. Suki and Ding produced it from 2006 to 2015, Eli Gerstner produced it from 2016 to 2022, followed by Shloime Steinmetz from 2023.

The concert was originally directed for the first thirty years by Yisroel Lamm, conducting the Neginah Orchestra. Following his retirement, various conductors participated, sometimes several in one show, including Yoeli Dikman, Rafi Grady, Yuval Stupel, Tzvi Blumenfeld of Freilach Band, and Mendy Hershkowitz.

The concert is hosted by Nachum Segal, who succeeded the original host, Zale Newman.

Chaim Tutio has been the official concert photographer since 2016, succeeding Stan Weiss.

== Recent concerts ==
The 37th concert, held on January 5, 2024, included a hologram of performer Shlomo Carlebach, which generated controversy.

== Timeline ==
#	Date	Theme	Featured Performers	Venue
1	January 17, 1988	Around the Year	Mordechai Ben David, Avraham Fried, Yoel Sharabi	Avery Fisher Hall
2	January 22, 1989	25 Year Tribute to Jewish Music	Mordechai Ben David, ShIomo Carlebach, Dveykus, Piamentas, Ben Zion Shenker, Jo Amar, Or Chodosh, Pirchei, Avraham Rosenblum	Avery Fisher Hall
3	January 21, 1990		Avraham Fried, Harmony, Abie Rotenberg, Mordechai Ben David	Avery Fisher Hall
4	January 6, 1991		Mordechai Ben David, Dveykus, Journeys, Kol Achai, London School of Jewish Song	Avery Fisher Hall
5	January 12, 1992	Showcase of the Masters	Mordechai Ben David, Regesh, Yaron Gershovsky, Yaakov Uriel, Avi Piamenta, Yossi Piamenta, Abie Rotenberg, Yeedle Werdyger	Avery Fisher Hall
6	January 10, 1993	The Concert of a Lifetime	Mordechai Ben David, Shlomo Carlebach, Baruch Chait, Abie Rotenberg, Yoel Sharabi, Dedi Graucher, Yaron Gershovsky, Dov Levine, David Werdyger, Rivie Schwebel, Shlomo Simcha, Yossi Piamenta, Avraham Rosenblum & Ruby Harris, Yigal Calek & London Vocal Quartet	Avery Fisher Hall
7	January 9, 1994	The Next Stage	Mordechai Ben David, Miami Boys Choir, Gershon Veroba, Sandy Shmuely, Moshe Yess	Radio City Music Hall
8	January 8, 1995	Only Music	Mordechai Ben David, Miami Boys Choir, Abie Rotenberg, Ira Heller, Yeedle Werdyger, Yehuda Glantz	Avery Fisher Hall
9	February 4, 1996	Cities Salute Jerusalem	Avraham Fried, Prague Symphony Orchestra	Avery Fisher Hall
10	January 5, 1997	Tenth Anniversary	Dedi Graucher, Mendy Wald, Yoel Sharabi, Jo Amar, Yeedle Werdyger, Abie Rotenberg	Avery Fisher Hall
11	January 11, 1998	The Next Decade	Mordechai Ben David, Dedi Graucher, Amit Listvand	Metropolitan Opera House
12	1999		Mordechai Ben David, Avraham Fried, Amit Listvand	Metropolitan Opera House
13	January 9, 2000	Bar Mitzvah Celebration	Mordechai Ben David, Dedi Graucher, Abie Rotenberg, Shlomo Simcha, Toronto Kol Chaveirim Choir	Metropolitan Opera House
14	February 4, 2001		Mordechai Ben David, Avraham Fried, Ruby Harris, Toronto Vocal Ensemble	Metropolitan Opera House
15	January 13, 2002	United We Stand	Mordechai Ben David, Dedi Graucher, Baruch Abittan, Srully Williger, Shlomo Simcha, Abie Rotenberg, Yossi Green, Yeedle Werdyger, D’veykus, Toronto Kol Chaveirim Choir	Metropolitan Opera House
16	January 12, 2003	Vintage MBD	Mordechai Ben David, Yaakov Shwekey, Srully Williger, Shloime Dachs, Mendy Wald, Yeedle Werdyger, Baruch Chait, Toronto Kol Chaveirim Choir	Metropolitan Opera House
17	January 18, 2004	Jerusalem - The Experience	Mordechai Ben David, Shalsheles, Srully Williger, Chaim Dovid, Lipa Schmeltzer, Benzion Miller, Yaron Gershovsky	The Theater at Madison Square Garden
18	January 9, 2005	Chai - Eighteen Year Celebtration	Yaakov Shwekey, Yeshiva Boys Choir, Srully Williger, Ohad Moskowitz, Shlomo Simcha, Yossi Green, The Rabbis' Sons, Piamentas, Baruch Levine, Matisyahu, Eli Gerstner, Lipa Schmeltzer, Yaron Gershovsky	The Theater at Madison Square Garden
19	2006		Yaakov Shwekey, Abie Rotenberg, Avraham Fried, Yitzchak Meir Helfgot, Yeshiva Boys Choir	Carnegie Hall
20	January 14, 2007		Avraham Fried, Yitzchak Meir Helfgot, Lipa Schmeltzer, Dovid Gabay, Ohad Moskowitz, Dedi Graucher, Baruch Levine, Shalsheles Junior	Avery Fisher Hall
21	January 13, 2008		Avraham Fried, Yitzchok Meir Helfgot, Ohad Moskowitz, Dudu Fisher, Shlomo Katz, Yeshiva Boys Choir, Eitan Katz	Avery Fisher Hall
22	January 11, 2009		Yaakov Shwekey, Yitzchok Meir Helfgot, Yehuda Green, Dovid Gabay, Baruch Levine, Abie Rotenberg, Yossi Piamenta, Moni Piamenta	Avery Fisher Hall
23	January 10, 2010		Avraham Fried, Lipa Schmeltzer, Dedi Graucher, Yitzchak Fuchs	Avery Fisher Hall
24	January 9, 2011	A Time for Duets	Abie Rotenberg, Baruch Levine, Ohad Moskowitz, Yehuda Green, Lipa Schmeltzer, Shloime Gertner, Shalsheles, Shalsheles Jr, Avraham Fried, Benny Friedman, Yonatan Shainfeld, Yeshiva Boys Choir	Avery Fisher Hall
25	January 8, 2012	A Time For Celebration	Avraham Fried, Lipa Schmeltzer, Shloime Gertner, Ohad Moskowitz, Dedi Graucher, Dovid Gabay, Abie Rotenberg, Eitan Katz, Yehuda Green, Chaim Dovid, Uncle Moishy, Yoel Sharabi, Shalsheles, Shalsheles Jr, Maccabeats, Yitzchok Meir Helfgot, Journeys, Srully Williger, Mendy Wald, Shloime Dachs, Baruch Levine, Miami Boys Choir	Avery Fisher Hall
26	January 13, 2013	We're Back	Mordechai Ben David, Avraham Fried, Abie Rotenberg, Michoel Pruzansky, Yeedle Werdyger, Benny Friedman	Avery Fisher Hall
27	January 12, 2014	Celebrating 40 Years of Camp HASC	Avraham Fried, Abie Rotenberg, Diaspora Yeshiva Band, Ohad Moskowitz, Baruch Levine, Benny Friedman, 8th Day, Ari Goldwag, Ieshula Ishakis	Avery Fisher Hall
28	January 11, 2015		Yaakov Shwekey, Abie Rotenberg, Benny Friedman, Simcha Leiner, Dedi & Aviel Graucher	Avery Fisher Hall
29	January 10, 2016		Yaakov Shwekey, Abie Rotenberg, 8th Day, Lev Tahor, Yonatan Razel, Piamentas	David Geffen Hall
30	January 15, 2017	A 30 Year Celebration	Abie Rotenberg, Rivie Schwebel, Baruch Levine, Avraham Fried, Yaakov Shwekey	David Geffen Hall
31	January 7, 2018		Avraham Fried, Ari Goldwag, Shalsheles, Meilech Kohn, Eli Gerstner, Yeshiva Boys Choir, Simcha Leiner, Baruch Chait	David Geffen Hall
32	January 6, 2019		Zusha, Pumpidisa, Matt Dubb, Abie Rotenberg, Shlomo Simcha, Mordechai Shapiro, Beri Weber, Or Chodosh, Eli Gerstner, Shlomo Schachter, Yishai Lapidot, Yaakov Shwekey, Abie Rotenberg	David Geffen Hall
33	January 12, 2020		Avraham Fried, Ishay Ribo, Shulem Lemmer, Yerachmiel Begun, Benny Friedman, Simcha Leiner, Avraham Rosenblum, Joey Newcomb	David Geffen Hall
34	February 14, 2021		Beri Weber, Matt Dubb, Joey Newcomb, Baruch Levine, Yaakov Shwekey, Avraham Fried	American Dream
35	January 9, 2022		Avraham Fried, Chaim Yisrael, Joey Newcomb, Mordechai Shapiro, Ishay Ribo, Lipa Schmeltzer	Bell Works
36	January 9, 2023		Yaakov Shwekey, Akiva, Shulem Lemmer, Itzik Dadya, Eitan Katz, Yitzy Waldner, Miami Boys Choir	New Jersey Performing Arts Center
37	January 5, 2024	A Time for Unity	Shulem Lemmer, Benny Friedman, Ari Hill, Shalom Berholtz, Shmuel, Mordechai Shapiro, Baruch Levine, Abie Rotenberg, Alex Clare, Avraham Fried, Matt Dubb	New Jersey Performing Arts Center
38	January 19, 2025	Beyond Words	Eli Schwebel, Rivie Schwebel, Benny Friedman, Avraham Fried, Shuli Rand, Zusha, Yonatan Razel, Yaakov Shwekey	New Jersey Performing Arts Center
39	January 18, 2026		Shulem Lemmer, Shmueli Ungar, Sruly Green, Benny Friedman, Itzik Dadya, Moti Weiss, Naftali Kempeh, TYH Boys, Mendy Worch, Chaim Ghoori	New Jersey Performing Arts Center
