= Dedi Graucher =

Israeli singer (1961–2023)

Dedi Graucher עודד דוד גראוכר

Background information
- Also known as: Dedi
- Born: Oded David Graucher; 28 July 1961; Israel
- Died: 11 September 2023 (aged 62) Israel
- Genres: Contemporary Jewish religious music
- Years active: 1990–2023
- Spouse: Malca Devorah (Sand) Graucher

Oded David "Dedi" Graucher (Hebrew: עודד דוד גראוכר; 1961 – 11 September 2023), known professionally as Dedi, was an Israeli Orthodox Jewish singer.

== Music career ==
Dedi began his music career providing back-up vocals on Mordechai Ben David's albums in the late 1970s and early 1980s. In 1995 he performed with Ben David at two Sukkot concerts in Israel, one in Haifa that drew 3,000 participants and one at Yad Eliyahu Stadium in Tel Aviv that attracted 10,000 people.

Dedi performed the songs "Hebron" and "Lo Nazuz Mipo" ("We Will Not Move From Here") on the album Hebron's Song of Songs.

Dedi collaborated with composers Yossi Green, Rabbi Boruch Chait, Abie Rotenberg, and others on songs featured on his albums. The music on his albums was arranged by Moshe Laufer, Mona (Moshe) Rosenblum, Suki Berry, Yisroel Lamm (the Neginah Orchestra), and Ruvi Banet. He was featured at several HASC "A Time for Music" concerts, including HASC 6 (1993), HASC 15 (2002), HASC 20 (2007), HASC 23 (2010), and HASC 25 (2012). In 2004, Dedi appeared in concert with Yerachmiel Begun and the Miami Boys Choir for their 26th anniversary celebration, entitled "Miami and Dedi". The concert was released on CD and DVD. He also appeared on a number of all-star cast albums produced by Suki & Ding, as well as Gideon Levine.

== Personal life and death ==
Dedi lived with his wife Malka in Petah Tikva. Their son, Rabbi Aviel Graucher, is a music arranger and composer.

Dedi Graucher died from medical complications on 11 September 2023, at the age of 62.

== Discography ==
=== Solo albums ===
- V'sechezena (1979)
- Ra'iti Ish Baderech (Single) (1980)
- Rotzoh (1993)
- Omnom (1994)
- V'ohavto (1996)
- Bit'chu Bashem (1997)
- Adon Hashalom (1999)
- Hooked on Dedi (2001)
- Mipnei Ma (Single) (2002)
- Hakol Letova (2003)
- Baou Nesameach (Single) (2017)
- Vechozakto (Single) (2017)

=== Collaborations ===
- Duo Re'im – Neshama (Background Choir) (Uncredited) (1977)
- Mordechai Ben David – V'chol Ma'aminim (Background Vocals) (1978)
- Bnei Akiva Jubilee – 50 Year Jubilee — Kadesh Chayecha (Solo) (1979)
- Mordechai Ben David – Memories (Backup Choir) (1981)
- Chayah Rosenfeld - Stars of Chasidic Music in Songs — Zechor Hashem & Galeh Kvod (Solo)
- Hassidic Hit Parade 5742 — Esa Einai (Solo) (1983)
- Aryeh Glazer – Benei Beyscha (Background Vocals)
- Laibale Haschel – Mital Hashamayim Umishmanei Ha'aretz (Vocals) (1987)
- Kol Salonika – Vesamachta (Soloist) (1989)
- HASC – A Time for Music: Volumes 6, 10, 11, 12, 13, 15, 20, 23, 25 & 28
- Gideon Levine – The Best of the Best 1 & 2 (Solos) (1996, 2002)
- Jeff Horvitch – Dance with Chen 6 — Hashem He'elisa (Solo) (1998)
- Ma'arava Machon Rubin – Bema'arava Shiro — Lulei Sorascho (1999)
- Haneshama Lach Vol. 3 (2003) (with Shalhevet Orchestra)
- Miami & Dedi: Kol Yisrael Areivim Zeh Lazeh (2004) (with Miami Boys Choir)
- Ringling Bros. and Barnum & Bailey – Chol Hamoed Pesach (2005) (with Avraham Fried)
- Dedi & Yonatan (2005)
- The Event (2009) (with Lipa Schmeltzer, Mordechai Ben David, and others)
