= Dadya =

Dadya or Dadia (Hebrew: דדיה) is a surname. Notable people with the surname include:

- Claude Dadya, Israeli choreographer
- Itzik Dadya, Israeli musician
- Or Dadia, Israeli footballer
