= Vehi Sheamda =

Jewish liturgical poem

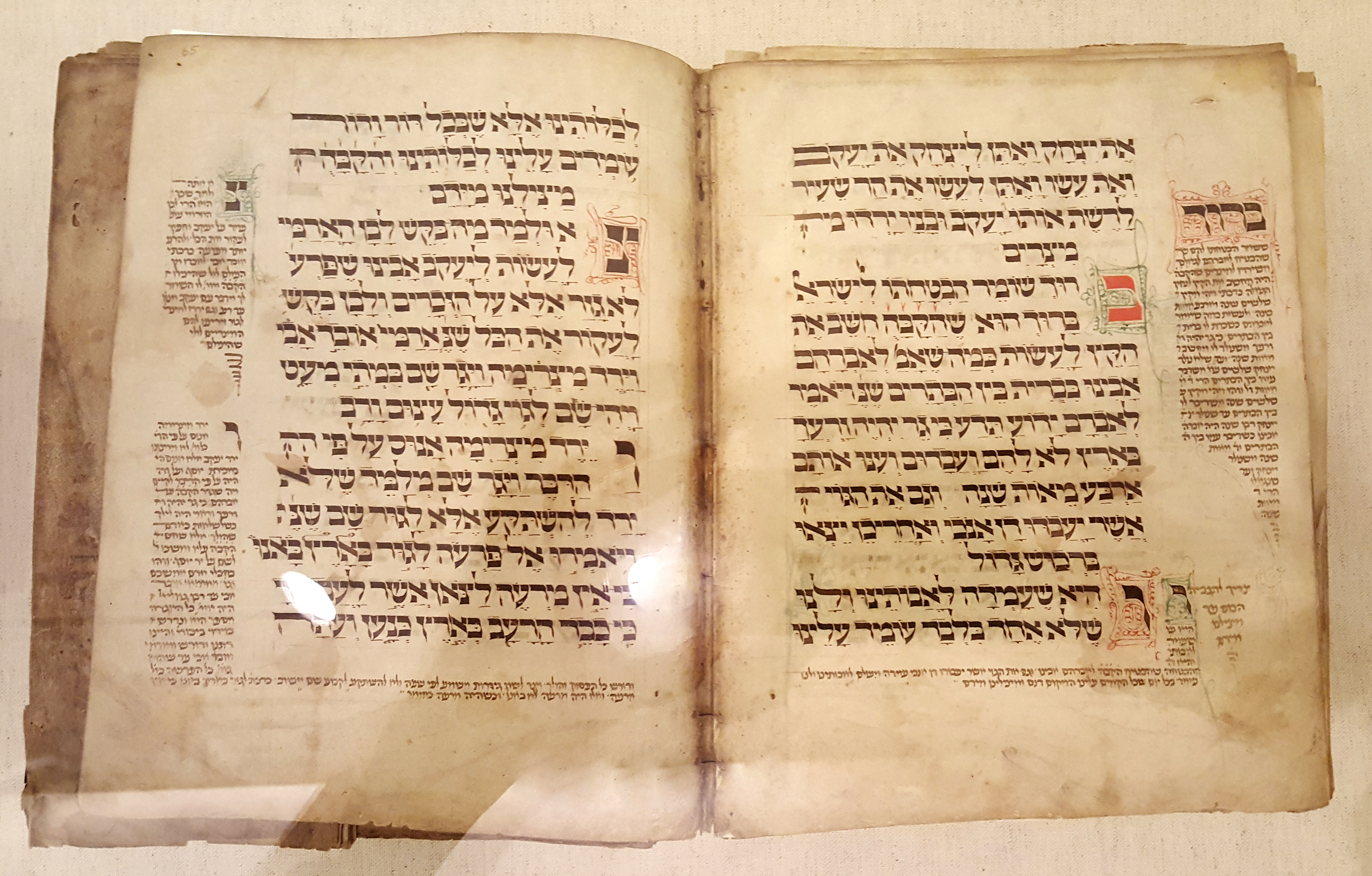
Passover Haggadah, 14th century.

Vehi Sheamda (Hebrew: וְהִיא שֶׁעָמְדָה, lit. 'It Is This That Has Sustained [us]') is a Jewish piyyut (liturgical poem) in the Haggadah of Passover Seder that mention's God's promise of ending the exile of the Jews from the Land of Israel.

== Composition ==
Vehi Sheamda is a short passage in the Haggadah of Passover Seder that deals with saving the people of Israel by God, from all His enemies. It is customary to read the passage in a melody, and today it is also prevalent as a piyut on its own. It follows the previous paragraph of the text regarding God's promise of ending the exile of the Jews and moreover, setting them free with much wealth.

Hebrew	Transliteration	Translation
וְהִיא שֶׁעָמְדָה לַאֲבוֹתֵינוּ וְלָנוּ שֶׁלֹּא אֶחָד בִּלְבָד עָמַד עָלֵינוּ לְכַלּוֹתֵנוּ אֶלָּא שֶׁבְּכָל דּוֹר וָדוֹר עוֹמְדִים עָלֵינוּ לְכַלּוֹתֵנוּ וְהַקָּדוֹשׁ בָּרוּךְ הוּא מַצִּילֵנוּ מִיָּדָם	V'hi she-am'dah la-avoteinu v'lanu. Shelo echad bilvad, amad aleinu l'chaloteinu. Ela sheb'chol dor vador, om'dim aleinu l'chaloteinu, v'HaKadosh Baruch Hu matzileinu mi-yadam.	And it is this (the promise) that has stood by our ancestors and for us. For not only one (enemy) has risen up against us to destroy us, but in every generation they rise up to destroy us. But the Holy One, Blessed be He, delivers us from their hands.

== Musical adaptations ==
Orthodox singer Yonatan Razel, who sets Jewish liturgical poems and prayers into song, gained fame in 2009 for setting "Vehi Sheamda" to music for Yaakov Shwekey. Israeli Haredi radio station Kol Chai named the song its "Song of the Decade" as the song became popular with both secular and religious listeners, becoming an anthem for the holiday of Passover in Israel.

During the COVID-19 pandemic in Israel, Israeli singer Eden Ben Zaken performed a cover of "Vehi Sheamda" on YouTube.
