= Chaim Zanvil Abramowitz =

20th-century Hasidic Rebbe born in Romania

- Title: Ribnitzer Rebbe

Personal life
- Born: חיים זאנוויל אבראמאוויטש; 1902 Botoșani, Romania
- Died: 18 October 1995 (92/93) Monsey, New York, U.S.

Religious life
- Religion: Judaism

Jewish leader
- Began: 1930?
- Ended: 18 October 1995

Chaim Zanvil Abramowitz (Yiddish: חיים זאנוויל אבראמאוויטש, Hebrew: חיים זנוויל אברהמוביץ, 1902 – 18 October 1995) was known as the Ribnitzer Rebbe (ריבניצער רבי), and considered a great Hasidic tzadik of Rîbnița (present-day Transnistria, Moldova). Others, including singer Mordechai Ben David, who was one of the rabbi's close disciples, said that he was born in 1893 and was 102 when he died.

Abramowitz was a prominent follower of Rabbi Avrohom Matisyohu of Shtefanesht.
