= Yaakov Shwekey =

American Jewish singer

Yaakov Shwekey יעקב שוואקי
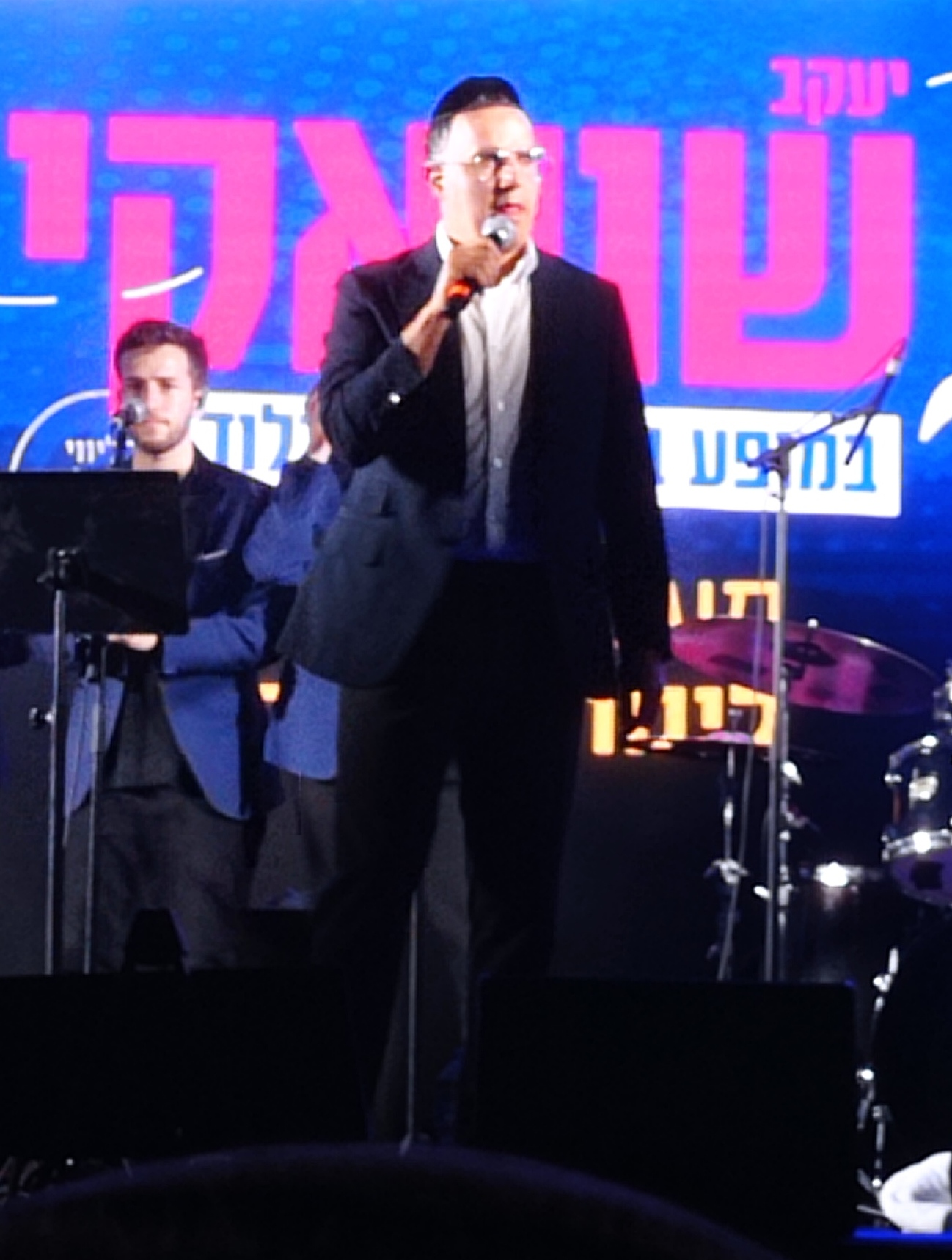
- Shwekey in Lod, 2021

Background information
- Born: Yaakov Choueka; 12 January 1977 (age 49); Jerusalem
- Genre: Contemporary Jewish religious music
- Occupation: singer
- Years active: 2001-present
- Website: www.yaakovshwekey.com

Yaakov Shwekey (Hebrew: יעקב שוואקי) is an Orthodox Jewish recording artist and musical entertainer. He is of Egyptian and Syrian Sephardic heritage from his father's side; and Ashkenazi from his mother‘s side.

== Family and early life ==
Shwekey was born in Jerusalem to an Ashkenazi Jewish mother raised in the United States, and a Sephardi Jewish father born in Cairo to a family from a Syrian background. His parents had met and married in New York City. In his early years, Shwekey lived in the Bayit VeGan neighborhood of Jerusalem, but he eventually moved to Polanco, Mexico City, and attended Yeshiva Ateret Yosef. He later lived in Lakewood, NJ, and Brooklyn, NY, and attended Yeshiva of Brooklyn before moving to Long Branch, NJ. As a child, he sang in the Ateret Yosef Choir in Mexico City, and he and his brother, Yisroel Meir, sang with the Miami Boys Choir for a short period of time. In his young adult years, Shwekey studied in Rabbi Menachem Davidowitz's yeshiva (TIUNY) in Rochester, NY. After studying for a few years in the Deal kollel and his subsequent marriage, Shwekey launched his professional career as a singer.

== Musical style ==
Shwekey's songs and lyrics are generally composed by others. Until late 2015, his albums were produced by Yochi Briskman, and distributed in the US by Aderet Music, and in Israel by JMI. Going forward, he has produced his own albums with Yitzy Waldner. Many different arrangers have arranged his albums in the past including Moshe Laufer, Mona Rosenblum, Yanky Briskman, Avrumi Berko, Leib Yaakov Rigler, and Yisroel Lamm. Until 2006 Shwekey's primary studio was "Studio X" (run by Yochi Briskman, engineered by AJ Greenwald); today, some of his recording is done in his private home studio.

One of his best-known songs is Racheim (Have Compassion), composed by Pinky Weber. The lyrics are from the grace after meals, asking God to have mercy on the Jewish nation and the city of Jerusalem. As Shwekey describes this song, "It's a prayer. It's not just a song. We connect with God and ask Him to have mercy." In 2008/2009 Vehi She'omdah, composed by Yonatan Razel and debuted on his Live in Caesaria concert DVD, and later rerecorded on Ad Bli Dai, became a major hit. Many of his songs, including Shomati (from the Talmud) composed by Yossi Green, and Im Eshkacheich, from Psalm 137, composed by Yochanan Shapiro, have found considerable popularity as Jewish wedding songs. His latest hits are: Cry No More, Ra'u Banim, Bo'ee Be'shalom, Lo Ya'avod, Am Yisrael, and Et Rekod, among others. From his album We are a Miracle, the songs Maamin Benisim, Smachot, Maran Sheli, and Inshallah were met with critical acclaim and can be heard across the world at Jewish events and celebrations and in Jewish homes, schools, and camps. He sang a new tune, composed by Yitzy Waldner, to Mi Shebeirach a prayer globally recited for soldiers in the IDF, in the Nokia Stadium, Tel Aviv in 2013, in the presence of many Israeli soldiers. In June 2018, Shwekey released Musica, on which he displayed a variety of styles, with lyrics in multiple languages.

== Recent projects ==
Shwekey released his tenth solo studio album in June 2018. Entitled Musica, it was Shwekey's second self-produced solo album (the first being We Are a Miracle), though in the credits, Shwekey credited Yitzy Waldner with being his co-producer. Waldner also composed most of the album's songs, with most of the lyrics for the album written by longtime lyricist Miriam Israeli. Additionally, Waldner made a guest appearance on the album's second song, Tefilat Hashla, as can be seen on music streaming service Spotify's catalogue of the album's songs.

Another album release was in 2019, “Those Were The Days 2”, a medley album featuring past hits and classics from various sources and arranged by different composers.

On 19 April 2020 during the COVID-19 pandemic, Shwekey collaborated with popular Chabad-Lubavitch rabbi and speaker Rabbi Y.Y. Jacobson, both working from home, to stream a free online live concert on YouTube. The reason for this, Shwekey said, was to "make people happy, because that's what God gave me the ability to do". The concert was viewed 138,000 times within its first three weeks online, and is still available on YouTube, accessible via the original link.

In 2021 Shwekey released A Toast to Life in which he sings songs which takes inspiration from Jewish life and themes in a typically Ashkenazi style of Hebrew pronunciation despite his Mizrahi heritage.

Shwekey said in an October 2025 interview that he will soon be releasing an album produced by Doni Gross, comprising over 100 Shabbat songs, together with a book co-authored by Shwekey and Yisroel Besser and published by ArtScroll.

== Concert controversy ==
In August 2007, Shwekey and Avraham Fried were slated to headline a major concert in Jerusalem at Teddy Stadium. The event was produced by Moshe Ben-Zimra and billed as a commemoration of the 40th anniversary of the reunification of Jerusalem. Leading Haredi rabbis, including Rabbi Yosef Shalom Elyashiv, the Gerrer Rebbe, the Belzer Rebbe, Rabbi Aharon Leib Shteinman, Rabbi Shmuel Wosner, and Rabbi Chaim Pinchas Scheinberg signed a ban which appeared in the Haredi press forbidding participation or attendance of the event or similar events. Their ban stated that concerts should not be performed in front of both men and women, regardless if there was separate seating.

Shwekey issued a response that he had already posed the question to Rabbi Ovadia Yosef when an earlier concert featuring him, along with Mordechai Ben David, was also banned. Rabbi Yosef responded that there is absolutely no prohibition as long as the event had completely separate seating. Neither Shwekey nor Fried pulled out of the concert.

== Notable duet concerts ==
In 2000, Shwekey performed a duet with a young Mordechai Shapiro to his song Rachem. In July 2019, Shwekey and Omer Adam sang a duet together. Yaakov Shwekey headlined a concert together with Shlomi Shabbat at Live Park in Rishon LeZion, Israel and Nokia Arena in Tel Aviv. On February 25, 2020, Yaakov Shwekey and Kobi Peretz headlined a concert together at the Pais Arena in Jerusalem. Yaakov Shwekey and Ishay Ribo performed together at a recent concert in Israel. Yaakov Shwekey and Hanan Ben Ari performed live in Tel Aviv together in 2016.

Shwekey has been praised for his ability to collaborate with Jewish musicians of various backgrounds and for having the rare ability to reach Jews from all corners of the Jewish world. He is widely considered one of the most popular Jewish religious singers in the world today.

== Personal life and philanthropy ==
He and his wife Jenine and their six children live in Long Branch, NJ. Jenine is the co-founder of the Special Children's Center in Lakewood, New Jersey, a respite and support program for special needs children, and Shwekey also volunteers much time and energy to this philanthropic endeavor. All proceeds of his single I Can Be were donated to the center. In an interview with Yated Ne'eman, Shwekey said, "I'm convinced that the success I've experienced in my music career is all because of our work with these special children."

Shwekey had a close relationship with Rabbi Ovadia Yosef, and his single Maran Sheli is dedicated to his memory.

=== Endorsement of Donald Trump ===
In August 2020, Shwekey held a concert at the Orthodox summer camp Camp Teumim Mesivta in Pennsylvania and performed "We Are America", a version of his 2016 single "We Are A Miracle" with new lyrics endorsing President Donald Trump's reelection campaign. The new lyrics had been written by Mishpacha editor Yisroel Besser for a Trump fundraiser earlier that summer at the home of late Trump donor Stanley Chera, and Shwekey would later film a music video for this version of the song. Video of the Teumim Mesivta performance, which showed Shwekey performing the song, and ending with chants of "U.S.A! U.S.A!", went viral online.

== Discography ==
Album name	Year released	Comments
Shomati	2001	Features the hits "Shomati" "Shehechiyonu" "Meheroh" "Racheim" & "Chasoif"
Shwekey 2	2002	Features the hits "Av Horachamim" "Hamelamed" "V'noh" & "Ki Hatov"
Besimcha	2003	Collection of popular Jewish wedding songs
Yedid	2004	Features the hits "Hu Yiftach" "Vehaarev" "Ben Bag Bag" "Omar" "Shema" & "Im Eshkocheich"
Behisorerus	2005	Collection of popular Kumzits songs
Live in Paris	2006	Also released on DVD
Leshem Shomayim (Shwekey 4)	2007	Features the hits "Birshus" "Eishes Chayil" "Emes" "Halo Yadata" "Ma Ma Ma" & "Tatte" in both English & Yiddish
Live in Caesaria, Israel 5768	2008	Also released on DVD. Includes duets with Yonatan Razel and Yossi Green
Ad Bli Dai (Shwekey V)	2009	Features the hits "Areivim" "Veshochanti" "Mimkomcha" "Illon" & "Vehi She'omdah"
The Shwekey Collection	2010	Triple album compilation of songs from previous albums
Libi Bamizrach	2010	Features the hits "Libi Bamizrach" "Boee Beshalom" "Hakadosh Baruch Hu" & "Rau Banim"
Live in Caesaria II, Israel 5770	2010	Also released on DVD. Includes duets with Chaim Yisrael, Baruch Levine, Yitzchak Meir Helfgot, and Acheinu. Features the hits "Refuah" & "Kol Mevaser"
Cry No More	2012	Features the hits "Kedai" "Lo Yaavod" "Oleinu" "Yesimcho" & "Cry No More"
Live in Nokia Stadium, Israel 5773	2013	Also released on DVD. Includes duets with Shai Abramson and Shlomi Shabat. Features the hit "Mi Shebeirach"
Kolot	2014	Includes duets with Shlomi Shabat and Aharon Razel. Features the hits "Am Yisrael" "Kolot" "Tefillat Kallah" "Et Rekod" & "Asara Bnei Adam"
I Can Be (Single)	2015	Also released as a music video
We Are A Miracle	2016	Features the hits "Maamin Benisim" "We Are A Miracle" "Smachot" "Maran Sheli" "Inshallah" & "Chaim Shel Shalom"
Those Were The Days: My Favorite Collection	2017	Double album featuring covers of many classic Jewish songs from a variety of artists and genres
A Time For Music 29 & 30, Part 1	2017	Also released on DVD. Includes a duet with Yitzy Waldner
A Mother's Promise (Single)	2018	Also released as a music video
Aleph Bais Gimmel (Single)	2018	Celebrates the release of Sholom Mordechai Rubashkin
Musica	2018	Released in June 2018; most compositions were done by Yitzy Waldner, who appears on "Tefilat Hashla". Album's arrangers are: Tamir Zur, Ian Freitor, Daniel Kapler, Ravid Kashti, Abie Rotenberg, Moshe Laufer, Avrumi Berko, Moshik Tzabbari and Rafi Greidi.
Those Were The Days 2: My Favorite Collection	2019	Album featuring covers of many classic Jewish songs from a variety of artists and genres
Shwekey Live Park, Israel 5779	2021	Also released on DVD. Includes duets with Shlomi Shabbat, Yonatan Razel, Ishay Ribo and Tzemed Yeled.
A Toast To Life	2021	13 songs in various styles in Hebrew, English and Yiddish
Elevate	2022	Each track is a collaboration with a different Jewish music artist or band, in memory of Yossi Kohn who died in the 2021 Meron crowd crush.
Guf Uneshama (EP)	2024	
Ahavat Olam (EP)	2024	
Dor Tzame L'Or (EP)	2024	
Shabbat Gan Eden (EP)	2025	
From Galus to Geula (EP)	2025	
Erev Shabbos	2025	Collection of popular Shabbos songs
Kabolas Shabbos	2025	Collection of popular Shabbos songs
Kiddush	2025	Collection of popular Shabbos songs
Friday Night Zemiros	2025	Collection of popular Shabbos songs
Kah Ribon	2025	Collection of popular Shabbos songs
Oneg Shabbos	2026	Collection of popular Shabbos songs
Tefilas Shabbos	2026	Collection of popular Shabbos songs
Seudas Shabbos	2026	Collection of popular Shabbos songs
Shalosh Seudos	2026	Collection of popular Shabbos songs
Havdalah & Melaveh Malkah	2026	Collections of popular Shabbos songs
Pizmonim	2026	Collections of popular Shabbos songs
Happiness (EP)	2026	

In addition, Shwekey appears on the following albums:

- Yonasan Weiss with The Yeshiva Boys Choir, 1988 (Child Solo on "Maher")
- Torah Today (Miami Boys Choir), 1990 (Member of the Boys Choir)
- Shuvu El Hashem (R' Shmuel Brazil), 2000 ("Kechu", "Kerasicha", "Im Eshkachech", "Shuvi Nafshi", & "Yerushalayim")
- Dance With Neginah 5 (Neginah Orchestra), 2001 ("Zoche" & "Hora Medley")
- Dance With the Stars, 2002 ("Zoche")
- The Best of The Best 2 (Gideon Levine), 2002 ("Al Tiktzof")
- Miami 25 (Miami Boys Choir), 2002 ("Racheim" duet with Child Soloist Mordechai Shapiro)
- Journeys 4 (Abie Rotenberg), 2002 ("Mama Rachel")
- A Time for Music XVIII (HASC), 2005 ("Ben Bag Bag", "Mama Rachel", "Ki Hatov", " Racheim", “Ribono Shel Olam” & "Finale")
- Vezakeni (Baruch Levine), 2006 ("Vehu Keili")
- Eternity (Oorah), 2006 ("Eternity")
- A Time for Music XIX (HASC), 2006 ("Racheim","Mama Rachel", Yedid", "Shema Yisroel" & "Finale")
- Harei Yehuda (Yehuda Gilden), 2008 ("Yehi Shalom")
- A Time for Music XXII (HASC), 2009 ("Emes", "A Vinkele", "Leshem Shomayim", "Vehu Keili", "Mi K'amcha Yisrael", "Carlebach Medley", "Rachem Medley", "Ma Ma Ma", & "Finale")
- Mona 7 (Mona Rosenblum), 2017 ("Uteshuva U'Tefilah Utzedakah")
- Shir 3 (Shlomo Yehuda Rechnitz), 2021 ("Achas")
- Tzama 6 (Chabad) 2021 ("Mimitzrayim G'altonu")
- Lchaim & Nachas (Moshy Kraus) 2021 (Featured Performer)
- Legends Untie (Mendy Hershkowitz Band) 2023 (Featured Performer alongside Mordechai Ben David & Avraham Fried)
