= Yeedle Werdyger =

American Hasidic Jewish singer (born 1971)

- Born: Yehudah Werdyger; 1971 (age 54–55)
- Genres: Contemporary Jewish religious music
- Occupation: Vocalist
- Years active: 1994 – present
- Labels: Yeedle

Yehudah "Yeedle" Werdyger (born 1971) is an American Hasidic Jewish singer. He is the son of singer Mordechai Werdyger (stage name: Mordechai Ben David, MBD) and grandson of the cantor David Werdyger.

Yeedle (יידל) is a Yiddish diminutive of the Hebrew name Yehudah (יהודה)

== Production ==
Werdyger's fifth album, Lev Echad, included compositions by Akiva Homnick, Aharon Razel, and Werdyger cowriting with Eli Laufer.

Werdyger has produced his father Mordechai Ben David's albums starting from 2001; albums produced include:

- Maaminim Bnei Maaminim
- Kumzitz
- Efshar Letaken
- Kulam Ahuvim
- Tzeakah
- Hashpuos

== Family ==
Werdyger is the son of Mordechai Ben David and grandson of David Werdyger. His uncle Mendy Werdyger is a singer and music producer.

== Discography ==
=== Singles ===
- Motzi Asirim (2024)
- Vayehi Binsoah (2024)
- Torah Medley (EP) (2024)
- B'zeh Habayit - with Nemouel (2026)

=== Main albums ===
- Together (1993)
- Laasos Retzon Avicha (1995)
- Shiru Lamelech (Sing for the King) (1998)
- Yeedle IV (2002)
- Lev Echod (One Heart) (2008)
- A Verdiger Yid (2013)
- Hu V’lo Acher (2025)

=== Collaboration albums ===
- Just One Shabbos (1982)
- Jerusalem All Star Cast (1983)
- That Special Melody (1988)
- The Double Album (1990)
- HASC 5 - A Time for Music (1992)
- Three Generations (1993)
- Special Moments (1994)
- Solid Gold - Volume 1 (1997)
- Yachad (1999)
- Chazak! - Live at the Jacob Javits Center NY (2011)
- HASC 15 - A Time for Music (2002)
- A Day of Shabbat and Rest (2005)
- Shira Chadasha (2015)
- Shabbos with the Werdyger Family (2006)
- Shabbos With the Werdygers II (2010)
- HASC 26 - A Time For Music (2013)
- Boruch Sholom Blesofsky, Bishvili (2015)
