= Hebrew Academy for Special Children =

New York City-based Jewish educational organization

HASC
- Hebrew Academy For Special Children
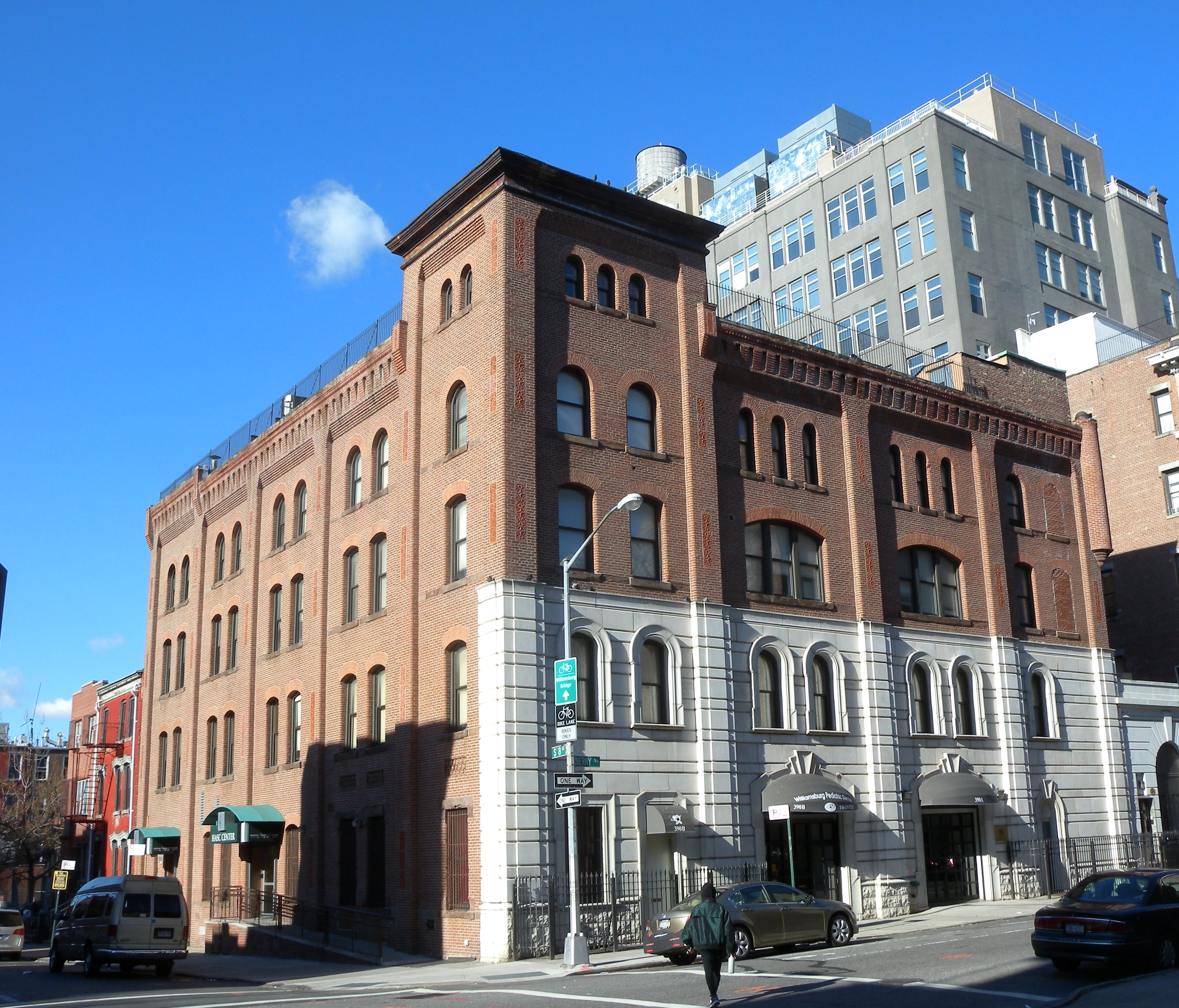
- Formation: 1963; 63 years ago
- Founder: Max and Blanche Kahn
- Type: Nonprofit
- Location: New York City, U.S.
- Director: Samuel Kahn
- Website: hasc.net

Hebrew Academy For Special Children (HASC) is a Jewish non-profit agency in New York City, United States, providing a wide range of supportive services to children with special needs. The organization is best known for its summer camps and its annual A Time for Music benefit concert.

== History ==
The HASC (Hebrew Academy For Special Children) Programs were established in 1963 by Rabbi Max and Blanche Kahn to provide educational and clinical services to individuals from infancy through adulthood who exhibit developmental delays. HASC is currently directed by Samuel Kahn.

== Services ==
HASC's services are geared toward infants, children, and adults with speech, learning, or motor limitations and also children who have behavioral difficulties. There are currently 6 locations in the New York region serving over 1,000 children. In addition, HASC provides programs and living quarters like Camp HASC and assisted living apartments throughout the New York City area.

A school is located in Woodmere, New York with a student body of approximately 890 students.

Programs are divided by approximate age ranges:

- Early Intervention (0-3)
- Preschool (3-5)
- School Age (5-21)
- Summer Camp (all ages)

== A Time for Music ==
HASC is well known for its annual A Time for Music benefit concert. These concerts have been annually since 1988 in venues such as Lincoln Center, Carnegie Hall, Madison Square Garden and New Jersey Performing Arts Center. The concert is viewed as a major event within the New York Jewish community, and has been described by Benny Friedman as "the Jewish Music Super Bowl". In the past it has attracted contemporary Jewish stars like Mordechai Ben David, Avraham Fried, Yaakov Shwekey and Matisyahu. The concert has been produced by Shloime Steinmetz since 2023, and is hosted by Nachum Segal.

== Camp HASC ==
Camp HASC is one of the many organizations founded by Max and Blanche Kahn, in the year 1970. Camp HASC is a host to over 300 special needs children each summer. These children are given individual counselors to work, play, and care for them throughout the entire summer. HASC also provides experience for new nurses just out of nursing school. For 7 weeks in the summer, newly qualified nurses work alongside the counselors. The Infirmary provides an aid for those in need, the campers and counselors alike.

== In the news ==
The school found itself in the news in 1998 when it named a building after Senator Alfonse D'Amato and the senator used derogatory terms about some of his political opponents in his acceptance speech.

The agency received a $430,000 federal grant in 2001 to establish a national service center for the disabled.
