= Yigal Calek =

Orthodox Jewish composer (1944–2024)

- יגאל צלק
- Born: 29 May 1944; Tel Aviv, Israel
- Died: 21 October 2024 (aged 80); London, England
- Education: Gateshead Yeshiva
- Occupations: Conductor, composer
- Years active: 1970—1999

Yigal Yisroel Calek (Hebrew: יגאל צליק; 29 May 1944—21 October 2024) was a British Orthodox Jewish conductor and composer of Israeli origin. He was the founder and conductor of the London School of Jewish Song, the first Orthodox Jewish children's choir.

== Early life ==
Calek was born in 1944 in Tel Aviv and grew up in the Neve Tzedek neighborhood in South Tel Aviv in a family of Ger Hasidism. As a child he studied at Tachkamoni School, and performed in plays at the children's theater next to the Cameri Theatre under the direction of Yosef Milo. In 1957, when he was 13 years old, his family immigrated to London, United Kingdom. He studied at the Gateshead yeshiva and after his marriage began to work as a Judaism teacher at a non-religious Jewish school in London, where, according to him, he recognized the need to create religious Jewish music. He began his musical career when he founded the school choir.

== Musical career ==
In 1970 Calek founded the London School of Jewish Song choir. The choir was considered a pioneer in the genre of Jewish music. Its debut album, Ma Navu, contained 14 songs, most of which were composed by Calek. Prominent songs from the album included "Sali Umetzudasi", "Al Zeh Hayah Daveh Libeinu", "Shimu Malachim", "Hamavdil", "Ki Heim Chayeinu" and "Yevanim". The choir's second album, Barchi Nafshi, released in 1971, included hits such as "Mar'eh Kohen", "Darkecha Eloikeinu" and "Ein Meilitz Yosher". Its third album, Ashira Lashem, was released in 1973 with the Neginah Orchestra, from which the hits "Ashira Lashem", "Yadav Shel Moshe", "Pedei" and "Chamol" stood out.

In 1974, Calek visited Israel and founded the Jerusalem Choir which operated in Bnei Brak. Together with the choir, he released the album Jerusalem Choir - Yad Bzemer. Notable songs from the album included "Kol Berama", "Vaamartem" and "Hinei Ma Toiv". These three songs were the first famous songs of Yossi Green, who was then an 18-year-old yeshiva student. After a few months Calek returned to London and the choir disbanded. It was re-established a few years later by Hanan Avital in a different format.

After six albums of the London School of Jewish Song, in 1978, Calek closed the choir and took a break from musical activity. He renewed the choir's activities in 1988, when he released with the choir the album The Return Of The London School Of Jewish Music. In 1991, the choir released the album The London School of Jewish Song. In 1997, the choir released its ninth and last album V'nisa Bracha. The choir continued to perform for another three years and closed in 1999.

=== Albums ===
- Ma Navu (1970)
- Barchi Nafshi (1971)
- Ashira Lashem (1973)
- London Live (Brooklyn College, 1975)

== Personal and later life ==
Calek suffered a stroke in 2021, leaving him in "severe" condition. He died on 21 October 2024, at the age of 80.
