= Itzik Dadya =

Israeli musician

- Itshak Dadon
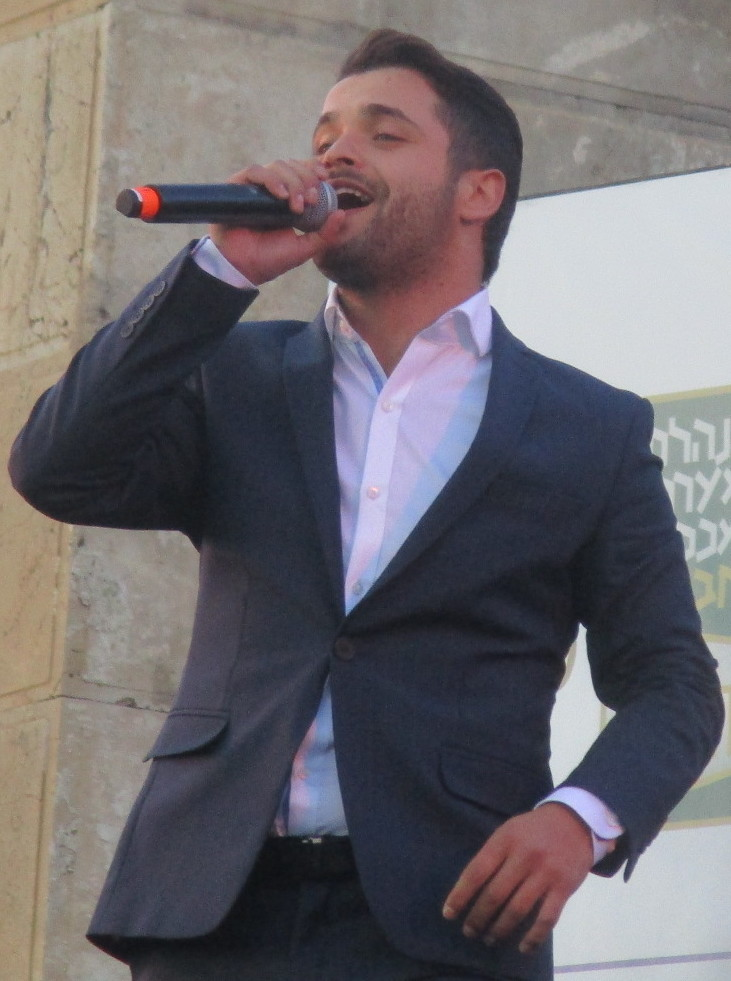
- Dadya in 2019
- Born: 18 December 1993 (age 32)

Itzik Dadya (Hebrew: איציק דדיה; born 18 December 1993) is an ultra-Orthodox Israeli musician and producer.

== Career ==
Dadya enlisted in the Israel Defense Forces and participated in the 2014 Gaza War.

In December 2024 Dadya released "Rokedli" a pop single. In June 2025, Dadya released the second part of "Forever", an album of wedding music.

== Personal life ==
Dadya married Esther, a physician, on September 20, 2023 in New York.

== Discography ==
=== Albums and EPs ===
Title	Year	Ref.
Forever: Volume 2 (Hebrew: לָנֶצַח)	2025	
Forever: Volume 1 (Hebrew: לָנֶצַח)	2025	
Sing from the Soul (Hebrew: לשיר מהנשמה)	2015	
Aiming for the Light (Hebrew: מכוון אל האור)	2013	
Am Yisrael Chai (Hebrew: עם ישראל חי)	2012	

=== Singles ===
Title	Year	Ref.
Always Love Me (Hebrew: תמיד אוהב אותי)	2024	
