= Avraham Fried =

Avraham Fried אברהם פריד
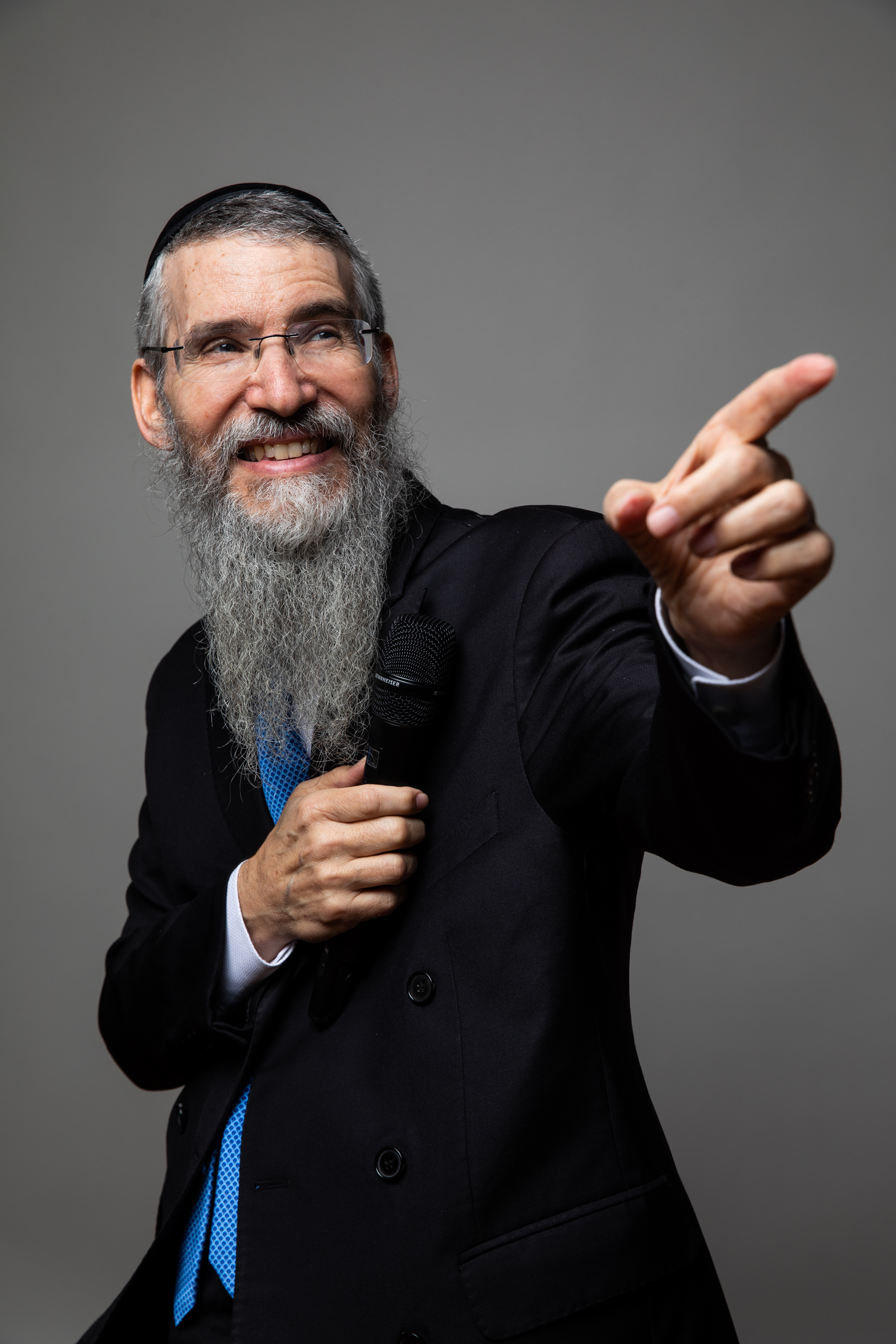

Background information
- Born: Avraham Shabsi (HaKohen) Friedman; March 22, 1959 (age 67)
- Origin: New York City
- Genre: Orthodox pop
- Occupations: Singer, songwriter, musician
- Instrument: Vocals
- Years active: 1981–present
- Labels: Sameach, Aderet
- Website: Avrahamfried.com Facebook Page

Avraham Shabsi Hakohen Friedman (Hebrew: אברהם שבתי הכהן פרידמן; born March 22, 1959) better known by his stage name, Avraham Fried, is an Orthodox Jewish American singer.

== Career ==
Fried was encouraged towards a music career by Rabbi Menachem Mendel Schneerson, the rebbe of Lubavitch, Rabbi Eli Teitelbaum, Mordechai Ben David and producer Sheya Mendlowitz. Fried began his career with the release of his first album No Jew Will Be Left Behind in 1981. The title song was composed by Yossi Green and the song "Kel Hahodaos" was written by Rabbi Baruch Chait of Kol Salonika & The Rabbis' Sons. Music was by the Zimriah Orchestra and arrangements by Marty Lewinter. Fried went on to collaborate with Sheya Mendlowitz and Yossi Green on eight albums. Green is credited with some of Fried's biggest hits, including "Aderaba", "Tanya", and "Didoh Bei". Fried also collaborated most notably with arranger Moshe Laufer over the years, but worked with a number of other arrangers including Marty Lewinter, Yisroel Lamm (the Neginah Orchestra), Suki Berry, Mona Rosenblum, Hershel Lebovits, Yaron Gershovsky, and others.

Avremel, as many of his friends call him, had appeared as a guest soloist on the Amudai Shaish Orchestra's Kol Sason V'kol Simcha - Wedding Album in 1981. During that same year he appeared as special guest star on Suki With a Touch of Ding II - Wedding Album. He also appeared as an adult soloist on the Amudai Shaish Boys Choir's third album (their second double album), in 1982. He also sang on a number of all-star cast albums produced by Suki & Ding.

In summer 2009, Fried made a concert tour in Israel where he introduced Israeli singer and composer Chanan Yovel and featured the songs "Rak T'filla" ("רק תפילה") and "U'Nesane Tokef" ("ונתנה תוקף").

== Musical style ==
His music is mostly categorized as pop Jewish music, similar to Mordechai Ben David and tends to integrate many styles of popular music, including pop, rock and jazz, with Jewish lyrics and themes. He also has a few "cantor" style songs on most of his albums, as well as many songs written in Yiddish.

== Family background ==
Fried's grandfather, Rabbi Meir Yisroel Isser Friedman, was the head of the Bobov Eitz Chaim Yeshiva in Krenitz, a renowned halakhist, and a Hasid of the Rebbe of Bluzhov. After World War II he resided in Crown Heights for many years, before moving to Borough Park, Brooklyn. His father, Yaakov Moshe Friedman, was originally a Hasid of Bobov, and worked as an administrator at the United Lubavitcher Yeshiva in Crown Heights for 40 years.

Fried is the youngest of eight children of the Friedman family. He has five brothers and two sisters. Fried and his siblings were all educated in Lubavitcher institutions, becoming Lubavitcher Hasidim. His brothers are all involved in Chabad outreach; his brother, Rabbi Manis Friedman, is an author, lecturer and shaliach (emissary) in St. Paul, Minnesota. Benzion and Eliyahu are shlichim in Overland Park, Kansas, and Safed, Israel, respectively. Yossi works at the Kehot Publication Society and Shlomo at Lubavitch Youth Organization. Two sisters, Feige Green in Florida and Ita Marcus in California, are also engaged in outreach.

His nephews include Jewish singers Benny Friedman (son of Manis), Eli Marcus & Shmuel and Bentzi Marcus (sons of Ita) of 8th Day, and Simche Friedman (son of Eliyahu).

Fried and his wife have six children and they live in Crown Heights, Brooklyn. He is a Kohen.

== Charity appearances ==
Fried has appeared several times in the annual A Time for Music HASC concert to benefit HASC (Hebrew Academy for Special Children), an organization that provides Jewish children with disabilities the chance to live a normal lifestyle. He most recently appeared in the 37th HASC concert, which took place at NJPAC in New Jersey on January 7, 2024. Avraham was the headline performer along with Mordechai Ben David and others at the Ohel [Organization] concerts in Madison Square Garden during the late 1990's.

== Discography ==
- No Jew Will Be Left Behind (1981)
- The Time is Now (1982)
- Forever One (1983)
- Melaveh Malka with Avraham Fried (1984)
- Goodbye Golus (1985)
- Around the Year Volume 2 (1986)
- The Good Old Days (1986)
- We Are Ready (1988)
- Around the Year Volume 3 (1989)
- Aderaba (1991)
- Yiddish Gems Volume 1 (1992)
- Shtar Hatnoim (1993)
- Yiddish Gems Volume 2 (1994)
- Brocha V'Hatzlocha (1995)
- Im Eshkachech Yerushalayim (2 CD's) (1996)
- Hupp Cossack! (1996)
- Hebrew Gems Volume 1 (1997)
- Hebrew Gems Volume 2 (1997)
- All the Best (compilation of songs on Suki & Ding Albums) (1997)
- Chazak! (1997)
- The Baal Shem Tov's Song (1998)
- My Fellow Jew - Yochid V'rabim (2001)
- Avraham Fried Live! (2 CD's) (2001)
- Avinu Malkeinu (2003)
- Bein Kach U'vein Kach (2006)
- My Father's Zemiros - The Zemiros of R' Yaakov Moshe Friedman (2008)
- Yankel Yankel (2009)
- 30 Hits, One Collection (compilation album) (3 CD's) (2009)
- Live In Israel (2 CD's) (2009)
- Keep Climbing (2012)
- Ah Mechayeh! (2013)
- Bring the House Down (2016)
- Kama Tov Shenifgashnu - The Israeli Album (2017)
- Project Relax with Avraham Fried (2020)
- Project Relax with Avraham Fried 2 (2022)

=== Other solos and singles ===
- 1971: Eliyohu Hanovee & V'hu Rachum (child solos) [part of Eli Lipsker albums]
- 1971:V'nikeisi (child solo) [part of S'dei Chemed International Vol. 1] (also heard on Goodbye Golus)
- 1972: Hakshiva (child solo) [part of Pirchei sings Al Chomosayich]
- 1976: V'hi Sheamdah (solo) [part of Nichoach vol. 8]
- 1980: A Moment of Meditation (Arukah M'eretz Midah) & Gam Ki Eileich (singles) [part of Amudai Shaish Wedding Album] (first promo for the Jewish music scene)
- 1981: V'hu K'chasan & Asher Bara/Chaim Shetehei Banu (singles) [part of Suki with a Touch of Ding 2; re-released as The Greatest Wedding Collection 2]
- 1981: Hodu Lahashem & Bo'ee V'shalom (solos) [part of Kol Naim Choir Sings the Best of Chaim Banet] (as Avraham Friedman)
- 1982: Shuvi Nafshi, Habot'chim, Pikudei & Mi Ho'ish (solos) [part of Amudai Shaish Boys Choir Volume 3]
- 1983: Al Kein Tzion (single) [part of Yerushalayim All-Star Cast]
- 1985: His'halelu, Stoliner Niggun, & Hashem's the World (singles) [part of Torah All-Star Cast]
- 1984: Pikudei Hashem & Ki L'cha Tov (singles) [part of Simcha All-Star Cast]
- 1986: [Album] Zelig Lider sings Sholom Aleichem (background vocals)
- 1987: Kol Rina & Keili Atah (singles) [part of Hallel All-Star Cast]
- 1987: Prok Yas Anach & Racheim B'chasdecha (solos) [part of MBD and Friends]
- 1987: You're Never Alone, Yiboneh, & Hisoriri (solos) [part of Holyland's Greatest Hits, re-released as You're Never Alone]
- 2002: Aleh Katan Sheli (single)
- 2003: Moriah (single) [part of Mona 4]
- 2005: Ani Choshev Aleichem (single)
- 2007: Galei (single) [part of Afikoman (Oorah)]
- 2008: Ma Oshiv (single) [part of Harei Yehudah]
- 2008: Ge'ulah Sheleimah (single) [part of Kosher L'Pesach Bagels (Oorah)]
- 2008: Hesech Hada'as (solo) [part of The 8th Note]
- 2009: Rak T'filla (single)
- 2009: Haazinu (solo/single)
- 2009: The Song of Miracles (single)
- 2010: Ki Hirbeisa (single)
- 2010: Kinor (single) [part of Shmorg 2 (Oorah)]
- 2010: Bar Yochai (single) [part of Kdai R' Shimon Bar Yochai - Teem Productions]
- 2010: Hu Yivneh Bayis (single) [part of Hamenagnim, Fried and Friends]
- 2011: Kama Tov Shenifgashnu (single)
- 2014: Racheim (single) [part of Shir]
- 2014: Oid Oid Oid (single) [part of The 2nd Dance 2]
- 2015: Boruch Haba (single) [part of 6 All New Songs]
- 2015: Ptach Libcha (solo/single)
- 2015: Greit Zich (single)
- 2016: Riboin Ho'olomim (single)
- 2016: V'zakeinu (single) [part of Shabbat HaMalka 3]
- 2016: Ata V'chartonu & Kad Yasvun (singles) [part of Shir 2]
- 2016: Shuva Hashem (single) [part of Tzamah 3]
- 2017: Maher (single)
- 2017: Al Hasela (single) [part of Tzamah 4]
- 2017: The Beinoni, Arba Bavos & Nyeh Zhuritze (singles) [part of The Nigunim]
- 2018: Pikudei Hashem (single)
- 2018: Mizmor L'soda (single) [part of Matana Tova]
- 2019: Aba (single)
- 2020: OhToToh (single)
- 2021: Mameh (single)
- 2023: B'korov Mamash (single)
- 2025: Layehudim (single)
- 2026: No Shtus (single)
