= Mordechai Ben David =

American Hasidic Jewish singer

Mordechai Ben David מָרְדֳּכַי בֶּן דָּוִד
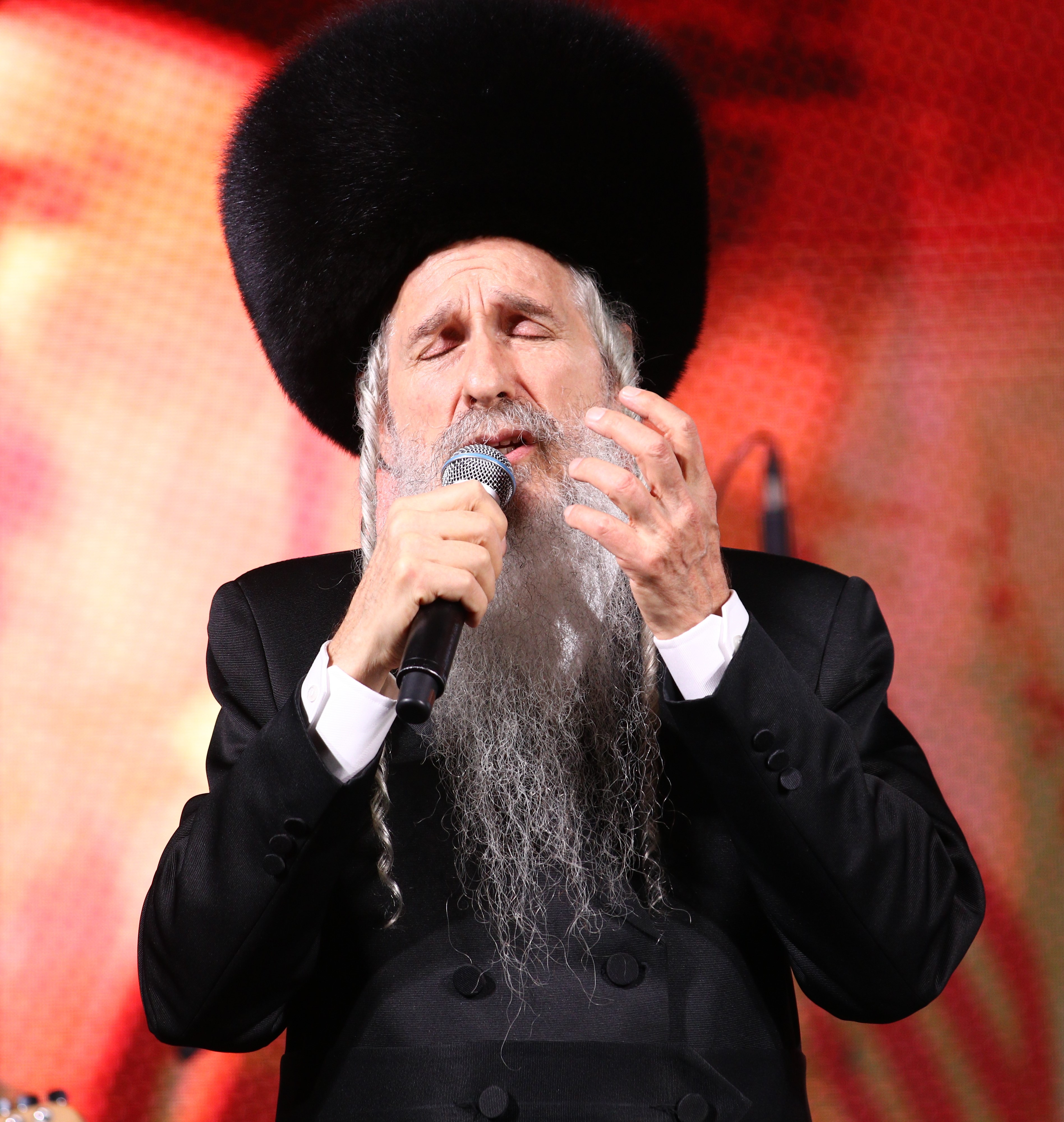
- Werdyger performing in 2024

Background information
- Also known as: MBD
- Born: Mordechai Werdyger; April 16, 1951 (age 75)
- Origin: Brooklyn, New York City, U.S.
- Genres: Orthodox pop
- Occupations: Vocalist; composer
- Years active: 1973–present

Mordechai Werdyger (Hebrew: מָרְדֳּכַי ווֶרְדִּיגֶר; born April 16, 1951) is an American Israeli Hasidic Jewish singer and songwriter who performs under the stage name Mordechai Ben David (Hebrew: מָרְדֳּכַי בֶּן דָּוִד, romanized: Mordocháy Ben-Davíd, lit. 'Mordecai, son of David') or simply MBD. He has released over 46 albums while performing internationally. He has headlined at charity concerts, especially those of HASC and Ohel.

== Early life ==
MBD was one of four sons born to David Werdyger, a hazzan (cantor) from Kraków who survived the Holocaust. MBD was a soloist on a number of his father's albums, which combined classic Hasidic niggunim (melodies) with cantorial vocals and classical instruments. Even so, his shyness and introversion caused him to be less inclined than his three cantor brothers to sing in public. Even much later in life, MBD has voiced his aversion to cantoring.

== Career ==
MBD began his musical career during a time when hazzanut was the main source of recorded music in Orthodox Jewish circles, with very few solo singer-performers. He was inspired by Ben Zion Shenker and Shlomo Carlebach, who in the early 1960s had pioneered a genre rooted in Hasidic and American folk music.

MBD's first concert performance was in 1972, when friends cajoled him to open for the musical group Ohr Chadash at Brooklyn College. At the event, for which he earned $50, MBD sang a few of his father's songs and some of the material from his own first album Mordechai Ben David Werdyger Sings Original Chassidic Niggunim. Noticed by a record producer, MBD was then invited to open for Yigal Calek and his London School of Jewish Song. The stage name Mordechai Ben David (lit. 'Mordechai, son of David') was suggested by a friend as a way for MBD to bolster his own career by connecting it to his father's notoriety.

For his next albums, MBD began to seek out the services of talented arrangers and composers. For 1974's Hineni, MBD worked with composer Yisroel Lamm of the Neginah Orchestra, which ushered in the beginnings of MBD's trademark sound. The title track was based upon a request from Esther Jungreis on behalf of her Hineni outreach organization. 1975's Neshama Soul benefitted from the talents of Mona Rosenblum, an Israeli arranger who had recently worked with MBD's father, thereafter opening up MBD's music to an international audience. At this point, MBD's musical trajectory was altered somewhat through the efforts of Chaim Zanvl Abramowitz—the Ribnitzer rebbe— who encouraged him to temper the modern and Israeli aspects of his music with a more traditional Hasidic singing style. The result was 1977's I'd Rather Pray and Sing, the title track of which was written by the rebbe's wife Freida Milka. The idea for the prayerful V'chol Ma'aminim - Songs of Yomim Noraim came one Saturday in 1978 when Suki Berry and David Nachman Golding ("Suki & Ding") heard the title track being sung during the seudah shlishit meal in their yeshiva. They hurried over to Jerusalem's Binyanei Hauma, played the song on a piano for MBD—who was scheduled to go on stage there—and offered to help produce a High Holy Days concept album. After the album was released, they became aware that the title track's melody had actually been composed by Shlomo Carlebach for his rendition of "Tov L'hodot". MBD also worked with Moshe Laufer, Yossi Green, Boruch Chait, Abie Rotenberg, Hershel Lebovits and Nachman Klein. He has also collaborated with musicians Yaron Gershovsky (director of the Manhattan Transfer), Daniel Freiberg and Ken Burgess.

Together with producer Sheya Mendlowitz, in 1981 MBD produced Avraham Fried's first solo album, entitled No Jew Will Be Left Behind. That same year, Mendlowitz was involved with two of MBD's releases: Mordechai Ben David Live (his first live album) and Memories, which was written in memory of his mother. This album also featured a number of songs composed by Yerachmiel Begun of the Toronto and Miami Boys Choirs. Over the following next few years, Mendlowitz and MBD jointly produced a number of hit albums together, including: his MBD & Friends (1987), Mostly Horas (1987), Yisroel Lamm & The Philharmonic Experience (1988), and 25 Years of Jewish Music (1988). Mendlowitz went on to produce Werdyger's Simen Tov - Keitzad (single album) (1989), and The Double Album (1990). He has also appeared on albums produced and sung by his son Yeedle, and brother Mendy. He has appeared on a number of "All Star Cast" albums produced by Suki & Ding, Gideon Levine, and Avi Fischoff.

MBD's single "Yachad Shivtei Yisrael" was composed in honor of the 2012 Siyum HaShas. A single composed for the Days of Awe, "Nekom", was released in 2015. In June 2017 he released the album Tzeaka including soloists Motty Steinmetz and Nussi Fuchs.

MBD records in his private studio in Sea Gate, Brooklyn. He has been called the "King of Jewish Music" and the "Jewish Michael Jackson". As of June 2004, his album sales have exceeded one million units. As of November 2022, he has recorded 46 albums and participated in 40 album collaborations.

== Genre ==
Many of MBD's lyrics are based on Hebrew prayer, biblical passages, and zemiros (Jewish religious poetry). Other songs, composed in English, Yiddish, and Modern Hebrew, carry religious themes such as the sanctity of Shabbos and the yearning for Moshiach. His recordings include traditional Hasidic melodies of Eastern European folk-style alongside more modern jazz, pop, and rock music.

While this style of music remains popular with Orthodox Jews, MBD's performances have occasionally been a target for criticism by the Haredi community. In June 2004, eight Haredi rabbis from Manchester decried MBD's upcoming concert in the Lowry as "a negative influence on young people" in a letter they signed, in which they urged their followers not to participate in the event. One of the rabbis said "We are becoming polluted with this popular sub-culture that is causing immorality. It is not true that this is 'religious' music as some people claim; this is a very different genre". The concert organizer dismissed the rebuke, comparing the "extremist" rabbis' religious fervor to that of suicide bombers, and asserted that this type of concert appealed to "99.99 per cent" of the Jewish community. A portion of the event's proceeds were earmarked for ZAKA, an Israeli organization that offers assistance in the wake of suicide attacks. The Manchester beth din (religious court) issued a clarification that the rabbis' statement did not represent the views of the beth din. MBD's concerts are typically gender-segregated.

== Political opinions ==
Beginning in the 1980s, some of MBD's songs began to carry political messages that emanated from current events and other issues of interest to Orthodox Jews. The title track of 1982's Just One Shabbos was a tribute to Meir Schuster, a rabbi who engaged in Orthodox Judaism outreach for many years at Jerusalem's Western Wall. In 1984 and 1985, MBD's songs "Hold On" and "Let My People Go" focused on the plight of Anatoly Natan Sharansky, a Jewish refusenik languishing behind the Iron Curtain. While "Hold On" expresses hope, "Let My People Go" specifically called for "support and pressure" to free Sharansky and Ida Nudel from captivity in the Soviet Union.

In 1986, Simcha Bunim Alter (sixth rebbe of Ger) asked MBD to headline at a mass demonstration in April of that year opposite the Temple Mount in protest of the construction of the BYU Jerusalem Center. MBD's quasi-rock beat "Not For Sale", which was written for the occasion, embodied the spirit of Haredi opposition to the center, which crystallized due to their fears that the Mormons would use it to proselytize to the Jews. The lyrics included such phrases as:

"You better run for your life, back to Utah overnight, before the mountain top opens wide to swallow you inside ... The wars, the pain, brought masses returning, back to their roots more than ever. The leftists fiercely fighting truth, dampening the sparks still burning. So wake up my friend, this is the very end, the arrows are pointing our way!"

In the end, the center was formally greenlighted by the Knesset after the Mormons pledged not to use the facility for missionary activity. Thirty-six years later, MBD remembered this performance as one of the most exhilarating moments of his career.

1994's "Yerushalayim We Will Never Leave You", recorded in Hebrew and English, protested the intent of dividing Jerusalem under the Oslo I Accord.

MBD released a single track in 1996, named "Chevron Always And Forever" (heb. חברון מאז ולתמיד), protesting proposed Israeli concessions over Hebron under the Oslo II Interim Agreement.

In 1999, on a track sung in Hebrew, "Ad Matay" (heb.עד מתי), written by Chaim Walder, MBD took on tensions between Israeli secular and religious parties. This dramatic composition expressed a heart-wrenching cry against internal hatred and takes an indirect shot at anti-religious politicians Yossi Sarid (Meretz) and Tommy Lapid (Shinui) by rhyming their surnames into a phrase depicting "the flame of hatred [lapid lit flame] which leaves no remnants [sarid lit remnant]".

In 2010, MBD re-wrote his famous English song "Unity", expressing protest of alleged Federal injustice to Sholom Rubashkin in his widely publicized case in the U.S. The song, renamed "Unity For Justice", was performed by MBD together with Avraham Fried and forty famous Jewish singers. An HD Video recording was publicized on a petition website as well as the social network.

In 2016, MBD attracted controversy after a December 29 concert performance in Jerusalem, wherein he remarked to the audience in Hebrew between songs, "Do you know when there will be peace? In a few weeks, when there will be a new president in the United States and the kushi goes home." The statement prompted applause from the audience, which included Jerusalem Mayor Nir Barkat and Interior Minister Aryeh Deri. The recorded comments, made in Hebrew and referencing outgoing US President Barack Obama and incoming president Donald Trump, were perceived by many who reviewed the footage as containing a pejorative term towards black people. In an opinion piece for Yeshiva World News, Yair Hoffman criticized media coverage of the incident, noting that the audience had cheered after "there will be a new president" rather than at the racial term. He wrote that while MBD's use of the term was "wrong" and merited an apology, the term itself was not necessarily pejorative or derogatory.

== Personal life ==
MBD's wife, Esther, is the daughter and sister of hazzanim. His brother Mendy, also a Jewish singer, is the owner of the Jewish record label Aderet Records and its retail store in Boro Park, Brooklyn. His son, Yeedle, and nephew, Yisroel Werdyger (Mendy's son), are also Jewish singers. His brother-in-law Ari Klein is a cantor who has recorded several albums. His cousin, Shmilu Rosenberg of Canada released two albums in the 1980s.

In April 2017, MBD wrote and released a song titled "Boee Besholom" dedicated to the marriage of his granddaughter. The song was sung at the wedding by MBD and singer Lipa Schmeltzer who was one of the guests. MBD resides in Sea Gate, Brooklyn.

== Song adaptations ==
A few of MBD's songs are adaptations of well-known, non-Jewish songs.

- "Hinei Lo Yanum" on Hineni (1974) is an adaptation of "Mamy Blue", originally composed by veteran French songwriter Hubert Giraud in 1970. In May 1971, Alain Milhaud, a French record producer based in Spain, acquired the song for Pop-Tops.
- "Shir Hashalom" on his Neshama-Soul album (1975) is an adaptation from Bobby Vinton's "My Melody of Love".
- "Blow the Shofer" on Moshiach is Coming Soon (1980) is an adaptation of Salvatore Adamo's "Tombe La Neige".
- "Lichtiger Shabbos" on Just One Shabbos (1982) [retitled "Yiddish" on Solid MBD (1993)] is an adaptation of "Close Every Door To Me", from the musical theater production Joseph and the Amazing Technicolor Dreamcoat, by Tim Rice and Andrew Lloyd Webber.
- "Kumt Aheim" on Jerusalem: Not For Sale (1986), commonly referred to as "Yidden" and retitled as such for the CD release, uses the music of "Dschinghis Khan" (English: Genghis Khan), from the German band Dschinghis Khan.
- "Father Dear" on Yerushalayim Our Home (1988) [retitled "Daddy Dear" on The English Collection (1998)] uses music from the song "Little Boy and the Old Man", written by singer-songwriter Wayne Shanklin.

In addition, "V'chol Ma'aminim", from MBD's album of the same name, was an adaptation of "Tov Lehodos", an earlier song by Shlomo Carlebach. "Yerushalayim Our Home" on Yerushalayim Our Home (1988) is based on the first verse and chorus of "Al Kapav Yavee" by Rivka Zohar.

== Discography ==
=== Solo albums ===
- Mordechai Ben David Werdyger Sings Original Chassidic Nigunim (1973)
- Hineni (1974)
- Neshama Soul (1975)
- I'd Rather Pray and Sing (1977)
- V'chol Ma'aminim - Songs of Yomim Noraim (1978)
- Moshiach Is Coming Soon (1980)
- Mordechai Ben David Live (1981)
- Memories (1981)
- Ich Hob Gevart (I Have Waited) (1982)
- Just One Shabbos (1982)
- Around the Year Vol. 1 (1983)
- Hold On (1984)
- Let My People Go (1985)
- Jerusalem Is Not For Sale (1986)
- MBD and Friends (1987)
- Jerusalem Our Home - Lekovod Yom Tov (1988)
- The Double Album (1990)
- Solid MBD (1990)
- Live in Yerushalayim (1991)
- Moshiach, Moshiach, Moshiach (1992)
- Tomid B'Simcha - Always Happy (1994)
- Once Upon a Niggun (1996)
- Ein Od Milvado (1997)
- The English Collection (1998)
- We Are One (1999)
- Maaminim (2001)
- Kumzits (2003)
- Nachamu Ami (EP) (2004)
- Efshar Letaken (2006)
- Yiddish Collection (2007)
- Kulam Ahuvim (2009)
- Platinum Collection (2009)
- Kisufim (2011)
- Tzeaka (2017)
- Hashpuois (2022)

=== Singles ===
- "Chevron - Always & Forever" (1996)
- "Siman Tov" / "Kaitzad" (1989)
- "Oorah" (2005)
- "Anovim Anovim" (2008)
- "Oorah" (2008)
- "Levado - Mishpacha" (2008)
- "The Unity Project" (2010)
- "Omdos Hoyu" (2012)
- "Yachad Shivtei Yisrael" (2012)
- "Afofuni" (2013)
- "Asher Boro/Simen Tov" (2014)
- "Nekom" (2015)
- "Beshir V'kol Toida" (2015)
- "Uvemakeihlois" (2015)
- "Tavoi" (2017)
- "Kdei Rabi Shimon" (2019)
- "Day" (2020)
- "Le'shana Haba'a Benei Chorin" (2021)
- "Forever/Lanetzach" (2022)
- "Chaverim Kol Yisroel" (2025)
- "V'chol Bo'ei Olam" (2025)

=== On his father David Werdyger's albums ===
- L'dovid Mizmor "Songs of David" (1960) (Credited as Marc)
- Gerer Melava Malka Melodies (1963)
- Skulaner Nigunim - Oidchu Hashem (1968)
- Melodies of Camp Kol-Ree-Nah (1969)
- Chassidic Nigunim (1971)
- Skulaner Nigunim 2 (1977)
- Melitzer Oneg Shabbos 2 (1979)
- Boyaner Nigunim - Yismechu Bemalchuscha (1980)
- Sadegurer Nigunim (1981) (Mordechai Ben David Orchestra)
- Satmerer Nigunim (1981)
- Father & Sons Biglal Avos (1984)
- Esso Einai El Hehorim (1985)
- A Shabbos with David Werdyger (1990)

=== Collaborations ===
- Jewish Education Program [JEP], Vol. 4 Someday We Will All Be Together (1979)
- Jerusalem (1983)
- Simcha (1984)
- Torah (1985)
- Hallel (1987)
- 25 Years of Jewish Music (1988)
- The Bentching Tape (1993)
- Yeedle, Together (1993)
- 3 Generations - Yom Shekulo Shabbos (1993)
- Special Moments With Mordechai Ben David, Mendy, & Yeedle Werdyger - The Wedding Album (1995)
- Yeedle, Laasos Retzon Avicha (1995)
- Best of the Best 1 (1996)
- Solid Gold Volume 1 (1997)
- Solid Gold Volume 2 (1998)
- Lev Vanefesh II (1998)
- Mona 3 (1998)
- Solid Gold Volume 3 (1999)
- Hameshorerim (1999)
- Ken Burgess, I'll Never Walk Alone in the Desert (2000)
- All Star Collection (2000)
- The Vocal Version (2001)
- Best of the Best 2 (2002)
- Yeedle, IV (2002)
- Mona, Mona 4 (2003)
- Sheves Achim, Shabbos In Mezibuz (2004)
- Ken Burgess, Melech (2005)
- Brand New (2005)
- Shabbos With the Werdygers 1 (2006)
- Yeedle, Lev Echad (2008)
- Hameorerim (2008)
- The 8th Note (2008)
- Shabbos With the Werdygers 2 (2010)
- Lipa Schmeltzer, Meimka Dlipa: From the Depth of My Heart (2010)
- Miami Boys Choir, Light Up the Nights & Greatest Dance Hits (2010)
- Big Time - Alter Heim - Then & Now (2011)
- Yeedle, A Verdige Yid (2013)
- Shir (2014)
- Shir 2 (2016)
- Lev El Haneshama (2019)
- All Star - Teniyos (2022)
- Ata Zocher (Single) - MBD & Ishay Ribo (2023)
