= List of Jewish rock bands =

The following is a list of Jewish rock bands and artists, bands which have Jewish themes in their music.

== List ==
Established	Artist	Notes
1959	Shlomo Carlebach	German-born Hasidic rabbi and musician. Drew inspiration from then-contemporary folk music and hippie culture. Founded Moshav Mevo Modi'im, birthplace of several influential Jewish rock bands.
1967	The Voices Four	Consisted of students of various New York theological seminaries. Drew inspiration from the contemporary psychedelic rock scene, creating a sound labeled by director David Koffman as “Jewish Soul.”
1976	Diaspora Yeshiva Band	Formed at Diaspora Yeshiva in Jerusalem. Played a bluegrass and rock fusion with Jewish lyrics.
1976	Safam	"Jewish-American" folk rock band formed by members of the Zamir Chorale of Boston.
1981	Yosi Piamenta	Jerusalem-born Orthodox singer-songwriter and rock guitarist. Described his music as "klezmer with electric guitar".
1981	Craig Taubman	Conservative singer-songwriter, best known for his children's music.
1982	Isaac Bitton	
1984	Tofa'ah	All-female Jewish rock/blues/jazz band from Jerusalem.
1985	John Zorn	Avant-garde composer and founder of Tzadik Records.
1987	Shlock Rock	Known for their Jewish-themed parodies of popular songs.
1991	Steve Lieberman	American Jewish outsider musician with elements of punk and metal. Also known as "The Gangsta Rabbi".
1992	Sam Glaser	Los Angeles-based Orthodox singer-songwriter.
1993	Reva L'Sheva	Carlebach-influenced folk rock band. Bassist Adam Wexler was in Diaspora Yeshiva Band.
1996	Soulfarm	Carlebach-inspired folk rock band. Lead singer Noah Solomon Chase is the son of Diaspora Yeshiva Band's Ben Zion Solomon.
1996	Dan Nichols	Reform singer-songwriter from Raleigh, North Carolina; founder of the band E18hteen.
1996	Hasidic New Wave	Experimental klezmer band from Manhattan.
1998	Moshav Band	Founded at Mevo Modi'im in 1995. Members Yehuda, Yosef, and Meir Solomon are sons of Diaspora Yeshiva Band's Ben Zion Solomon and were neighbors of Carlebach growing up.
1998	Rick Recht	St. Louis-based singer-songwriter who made his name performing at Jewish summer camps. Founded Jewish Rock Radio in 2010.
1998	Adi Ran	Hasidic musician based in Ramat Gan. Songs featured in the 2004 Israeli film Ushpizin.
2000	Yidcore	Australian comedic punk rock band.
2000	Pharaoh's Daughter	American psychedelic folk band with Middle Eastern and klezmer influences, promoted through Tzadik's Radical Jewish Culture series.
2001	La Mar Enfortuna	Side project of Elysian Fields focused on rediscovering Sephardic music. Incorporates jazz, folk, rock, Middle Eastern, and Latin music. Formerly signed to Tzadik Records.
2002	Oi Va Voi	British Jewish experimental klezmer band.
2003	Blue Fringe	Carlebach-inspired pop rock band, formed at Yeshiva University in 2001.
2003	Sefarad	Turkish Sefardic rock band.
2004	Matisyahu	Formerly-Hasidic reggae fusion artist; experienced mainstream success with his album Youth and its single "King Without a Crown".
2004	Black Ox Orkestar	Canadian folk/jazz/rock band performing Yiddish folk songs.
2005	Golem	New York-based klezmer/folk punk band.
2006	Rav Shmuel	Hasidic rabbi and singer-songwriter playing alternative rock and anti-folk music.
2006	Heedoosh	American-born Yemenite grunge/britpop band led by brothers Yaniv and Yahav Tsaidi.
2006	Aharit Hayamim	Israeli reggae rock band influenced by Carlebach and Nachman of Breslov.
2007	Aryeh Kunstler	Orthodox alternative rock singer-songwriter from Queens, New York. Bassist in Yaakov Chesed.
2007	Hamakor	American-Israeli grunge/trance band from Mevo Modi'im. Lead singer Nachman Solomon is the son of Diaspora's Ben Zion Solomon and has brothers in Soulfarm and Moshav Band.
2007	Yood	Israeli blues rock trio from Beit Shemesh. Formed by Lazer Lloyd of Reva L'Sheva.
2007	Yaakov Chesed	Orthodox alternative rock band from Long Island. Won Yeshiva University's Battle of the Bands in 2007.
2008	The Shondes	Brooklyn-based Jewish feminist punk band known for their political activism.
2009	Moshiach Oi!	Breslov-oriented hardcore punk band from Long Island.
2009	Ashira	All-female Orthodox Israeli band formed at Bar-Ilan University.
2009	Breslov Bar Band	Ensemble combining traditional Breslov melodies with styles including rock, punk, funk, jazz, reggae, and klezmer.
2010	JudaBlue	Orthodox rock band formed in Silver Spring, Maryland. Lead singer Shlomo Gaisin later formed Zusha.
2010	The Groggers	A Modern Orthodox satirical pop punk band from New York.
2011	Schmekel	Transgender Jewish folk punk band from Brooklyn, known for their humorous lyrics.
2011	Moshe Hecht Band	Folk rock band fronted by Moshe Hecht, a Chabad rabbi from Brooklyn.
2011	8th Day	Formed in California by nephews of Avraham Fried. Incorporates klezmer, funk, blues, and reggae.
2011	Shtar	Haredi rap rock band composed of American, British, and Israeli members. Formed at Aish HaTorah yeshiva in Jerusalem. Uses elements of Sephardic music.
2012	Bulletproof Stockings	All-female Hasidic alternative rock band from Crown Heights.
2013	Deveykus	Philadelphia-based drone/doom metal band incorporating traditional Hasidic nigunnim. Signed to Tzadik Records.
2014	Distant Cousins	Los Angeles indie pop band. Formed by Dov Rosenblatt of Blue Fringe and Duvid Swirsky of Moshav Band.
2014	Zusha	Neo-Hasidic folk/soul band specializing in nigunim. Co-formed by Shlomo Gaisin of JudaBlue.
