= Duvid Swirsky =

Israeli-American musician

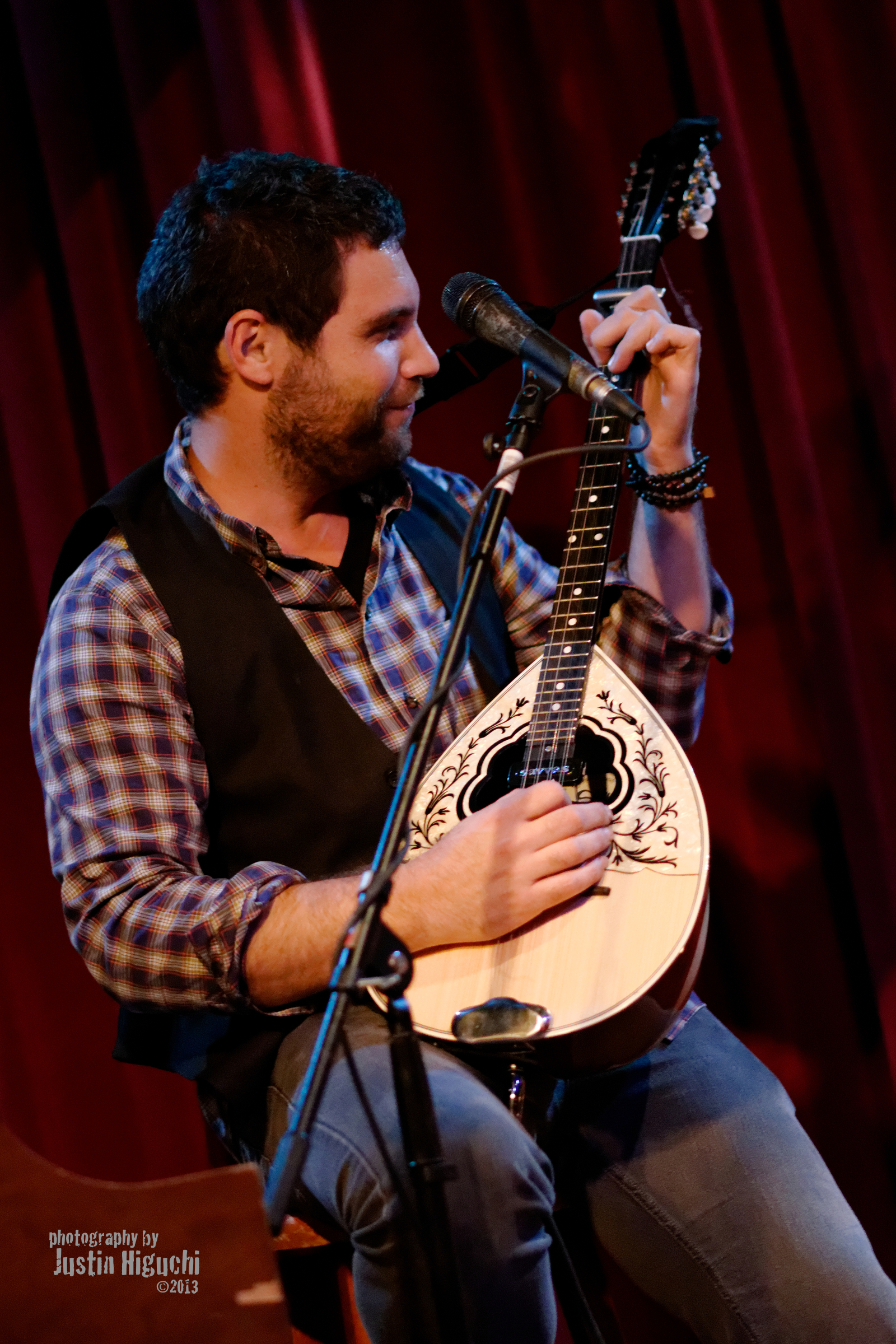

Background information
- Also known as: David Sky
- Born: April 2, 1976 (age 48); Xenia, Ohio
- Origin: Los Angeles, California
- Genres: Jewish rock, alternative rock, folk rock
- Occupation(s): Singer, songwriter, composer, guitarist
- Years active: 1995–present
- Member of: Moshav; Distant Cousins
- Formerly of: Skyland
- Website: dswirsky.com

Duvid Swirsky (born April 2, 1976) is an Israeli-American singer, songwriter, guitarist, and composer. He is best known as the guitarist, co-vocalist, and founding member of the Jewish rock band Moshav. He has also performed with the folk rock bands Skyland (with C Lanzbom) and Distant Cousins (with Dov Rosenblatt and Ami Kozak).

== Early life ==
Swirsky was born in the United States before his family moved to Mevo Modi'im, Israel when he was ten. The village's founder, influential Jewish singer Rabbi Shlomo Carlebach, would frequently visit the village and perform for the residents. Swirsky first played professionally when he was 15 as part of Carlebach's band at a Tel Aviv concert.

== Career ==
=== Moshav ===
Growing up in Mevo Modi'in, Swirsky became close friends with his neighbor Yehuda Solomon, whose father, Ben Zion Solomon, was a founding member of Diaspora Yeshiva Band and one of the first residents of the village. Swirsky and Solomon performed together from a young age and formed the Moshav Band in 1996. They have released ten albums since 1998 and have been credited, alongside Blue Fringe and Soulfarm, with pioneering a new movement of Jewish rock in the 1990s.

=== Skyland ===
Swirsky briefly collaborated with Soulfarm guitarist C Lanzbom in 2012 under the name Skyland. Their self-titled debut album was released on January 10, 2012 through Desert Rock Records and Sweet Sense Music.

=== Distant Cousins ===
Later in 2012, Swirsky, Blue Fringe lead singer Dov Rosenblatt, and singer-songwriter Ami Kozak formed the indie pop group Distant Cousins. They released two self-titled EPs (one in 2014, one in 2015) and have had their music appear in commercials, television shows, and films, including a soundtrack song, "Are You Ready (On Your Own)", for the 2014 film This Is Where I Leave You.

== Personal life ==
Swirsky lives in Los Angeles with his wife and two sons.

== Discography ==
=== Solo ===
2022: "Anani" (single)

=== With Moshav ===
- The Things You Can't Afford (1998)
- Days (1999)
- Lost Time (2002)
- Return Again (2004)
- Malachim (2005)
- The Best of Moshav Band: Higher and Higher (2005)
- Misplaced (2006)
- Dancing in a Dangerous World (2010)
- New Sun Rising (2013)
- Shabbat Vol. 1 (2014)

=== With Skyland ===
- Skyland (2012)

=== With Distant Cousins ===
- Next of Kin (2019)

=== Other ===
- 1996: Ben Zion Solomon and Sons, Give Me Harmony: Songs of R' Shlomo Carlebach – bass
- 2008: Rachel Diggs, Center of the Earth – composer on "Wanted"
- 2018: Shirat, Crazy EP – featured on "No One's Watching"
- 2019: Various, A Million Little Things Season 1 soundtrack – contributes "Be My Katie"
