= Ben Zion Solomon =

American-born Israeli musician

Ben Zion Solomon בן ציון סולומון
- Born: San Francisco, California
- Origin: Mevo Modi'im, Israel
- Genres: Jewish rock, folk
- Occupations: Singer, songwriter, producer, multi-instrumentalist, musicologist
- Instruments: Vocals, violin, banjo, mandolin, guitar, trumpet
- Years active: 1975-present

Ben Zion Solomon (Hebrew: בן ציון סולומון) is an American-born Israeli musician, best known as a founding member of the seminal Jewish rock group Diaspora Yeshiva Band, for whom he played fiddle and banjo from 1975 to 1983. A disciple of Shlomo Carlebach, Solomon and his family were among the first residents of Carlebach's moshav, Mevo Modi'im. His sons later founded the bands Moshav, Soulfarm, and Hamakor.

== Background ==
Solomon graduated from Berklee College of Music, where he studied music history.

While living in San Francisco's Haight-Ashbury neighborhood in the early 1970s, Solomon attended gatherings at The House of Love and Prayer. There, he met the shul's founder, Rabbi Shlomo Carlebach, who convinced him to move to Israel.

== Career ==
=== Diaspora Yeshiva Band ===
Solomon attended the Diaspora Yeshiva and co-founded the Diaspora Yeshiva Band in 1975 with fellow students Avraham Rosenblum, Simcha Abramson, Ruby Harris, Adam Wexler, and Gedalia Goldstein. Playing a mix of rock and bluegrass with Jewish lyrics, the group was highly influential in Jewish music and recorded six albums before disbanding in 1983.

=== Ben Zion Solomon and Sons ===
Solomon recorded three albums with his children under the name Ben Zion Solomon and Sons. They played alongside Reva L'Sheva at Binyanei HaUmah in 1998 to commemorate Carlebach's fourth yartzheit. They returned to the venue in 2012 for another Carlebach tribute concert, this time joined by Yehudah Katz, Chaim-Dovid Saracik, Shlomo Katz, and Aharon Razel.

== Family and personal life ==
Solomon met his wife, Dina, while living in California. Prior to meeting Carlebach, they were hippies and lived on a commune in northern California. Dina is currently a caterer and nutritionist and published the cookbook Wild Figs for Breakfast.

The Solomons were among the first families to settle in Carlebach's moshav Mevo Modi'im upon its establishment in 1976, handpicked by Carlebach himself. Actor Eric Anderson stayed at their house for Shabbat as preparation to play Carlebach in the Broadway musical Soul Doctor.

Several of Solomon's sons have become prominent Jewish musicians: Noah Solomon co-founded Soulfarm with C Lanzbom; Yehuda, Yosef, and Meir Solomon formed the Moshav Band with fellow Mevo Modi'im resident Duvid Swirsky; and Nachman Solomon formed Hamakor. Nachman, Yosef, and Sruli Solomon also perform together as the Solomon Brothers Band.

== Discography ==
=== Solo albums ===
- Now and Then (2006)

=== With Diaspora Yeshiva Band ===
- The Diaspora Yeshiva Band (1976)
- Melave Malka with the Diaspora Yeshiva Band (1977)
- At the Gate of Return (1978)
- Live From King David's Tomb (1980)
- Land of Our Fathers (1981)
- Diaspora Live on Mt. Zion (1982)
- Live at Carnegie Hall (1992)
- The Diaspora Collection (2000)

=== With Shlomo Carlebach ===
- Nachamu Nachamu Ami (1983) (producer, mandolin, violin)

=== With Ben Zion Solomon and Sons ===
- Give Me Harmony: Songs of R' Shlomo Carlebach (1996)
- L'Chu N'ran'noh (2000)
- Nishmas Kol Chai (2002)

=== Breslov albums and songbooks ===
Solomon has produced, researched, and performed on several albums of traditional melodies for the Breslov Research Institute.

- Shabbat Vol. 1 - Azamer Bishvochin (1986)
- Shabbat Vol. 2 - Me'eyn Olam Haba (1986)
- Simcha Vol. 1 - Ashreinu (1987)
- Simcha Vol. 2 - Plioh (1988)
- Shabbat Vol. 3 - Asader Lis'udoso (1990)
- Simcha Vol. 3 - Kochvei Boker (1993)
- Shabbat Vol. 4 - B'nei Heicholo (2007)
- Shabbat Vol. 5 - B'Moitso'ei Yoim M'nuchoh (2011)
