= Yehuda Solomon =

Israeli-American musician and hazzan

- Born: June 20, 1977 (age 49); Mevo Modi'im, Israel
- Origin: Los Angeles, California, United States
- Genres: Jewish rock, folk rock, Israeli music
- Instruments: Vocals, percussion
- Years active: 1995–present
- Member of: Moshav
- Website: moshavband.com

Yehuda Solomon (Hebrew: יהודה סולומון; born June 20, 1977) is an Israeli-American singer, songwriter, and hazzan. He is the lead singer and co-founder of the band Moshav, which heavily influenced Jewish rock in the late '90s. He is the son of Diaspora Yeshiva Band member Ben Zion Solomon, while his siblings include Noah Solomon of Soulfarm.

== Early life ==
Solomon was born and raised in Mevo Modi'im, an Israeli moshav founded by musician and spiritual leader Rabbi Shlomo Carlebach, who was a regular fixture in the village. His father is Ben Zion Solomon, a founding member of the Diaspora Yeshiva Band, while his brothers include Soulfarm's Noah Solomon, Hamakor's Nachman Solomon, and future Moshav bandmates Yosef and Meir Solomon.

== Career ==
=== Moshav ===
Solomon played together with his neighbor Duvid Swirsky from a young age, and the two formed the Moshav Band in 1996. They have released ten albums since 1998 and have been credited, alongside Blue Fringe and Soulfarm, with pioneering a new movement of Jewish rock in the 1990s.

=== Other activities ===
While living in Los Angeles, Solomon was the chazzan and prayer leader at the Happy Minyan, one of the largest Carlebach minyanim in the country.

He has worked several times with Jewish reggae singer Matisyahu; while Solomon provided Hebrew vocals on Matisyahu's song "Two Child One Drop" from his Shattered EP (2008). In 2016, Solomon and Jewish rapper Kosha Dillz made a surprise appearance on stage during a Matisyahu concert at the Wiltern Theatre.

He was one of the judges on the fourth season of A Jewish Star, a YouTube-based reality singing competition for Jewish singers. His fellow judges included Gad Elbaz, Lipa Schmeltzer, Yossi Green, and Yeedle Werdyger.

== Artistry ==
Solomon's vocal style combines aspects of cantorial chanting, Mizrahi music, and grunge, often being compared to Eddie Vedder.

== Personal life ==
In 2024, Solomon, along with his wife and children, returned to live in Israel, after having lived in Los Angeles since in 2000.

== Discography ==
=== With Moshav ===
- The Things You Can't Afford (1998)
- Days (1999)
- Lost Time (2002)
- Return Again (2004)
- Malachim (2005)
- The Best of Moshav Band: Higher and Higher (2005)
- Misplaced (2006)
- Dancing in a Dangerous World (2010)
- New Sun Rising (2013)
- Shabbat Vol. 1 (2014)
- Shabbat Vol. 2 (2018)

=== Other credits ===
- Ben Zion Solomon and Sons, Give Me Harmony: The Songs of Shlomo Carlebach (1996) – vocals
- Yaniv, Bakhol (2003) – choir/chorus
- Matisyahu, Shattered EP (2008) – vocals on "Two Child One Drop"
- Peter Himmelman, The Mystery and the Hum (2010) – background vocals
- Various Artists, A Cappella Treasury: Shabbos (2010) – primary artist on "Carlebach's V'Shomru"
- Hamakor, World On Its Side (2010) – background vocals on "Memories"
- Matisyahu, Live at Stubb's, Vol. 2 (2011) – guest artist, vocals, shofar
- Naftali Kalfa, The Naftali Kalfa Project (2013) – vocals with Gad Elbaz on "I Will Be"
- Diwon, Gonna Light EP (2013) – guest vocals ("Sivivon")
