= Rogers Park (band) =

American Hasidic folk rock duo

- Origin: Chicago, Illinois
- Genres: Jewish rock, folk rock
- Years active: 2011–present
- Members: Yosef Peysin; Mordy Kurtz
- Website: rogersparkband.com

Rogers Park is an American Hasidic folk rock duo from Chicago, Illinois. Formed in 2011 by childhood friends Yosef Peysin and Mordy Kurtz, the group is named after the Chicago neighborhood where they grew up. Their debut album, The Maggid, was released on January 19, 2016.

== History ==
Yosef Peysin and Mordy Kurtz grew up together in the Chabad community of Chicago's Rogers Park area, after which the band would later be named. They were involved in Chabad house outreach activities at the University of Illinois at Urbana–Champaign, including manning kosher food stands at the university's State Farm Center during basketball games. They formed Rogers Park in 2011, and were later named Continuum Theater's "Best Chicagoland Jewish Band 2014".

In June 2014, they recorded their debut single, "Sukkah's Falling", a Sukkos-themed parody of the Beatles song "I've Just Seen a Face". After taking time off to allow Peysin to attend yeshiva in Israel, they reconvened in early fall to film a video for the song on the UIUC campus with filmmaker Mendel Katz and comedian Mendy Pellin. Within two weeks of its September 30 release, the video had received 27,740 views on YouTube. In December, they released a cover of Moshe Yess' "Beggar Woman" with Diaspora Yeshiva Band violinist Ruby Harris.

The following year, the band released two more videos, "Shared Hearts" with the organization Libenu and "Golden Crown". In December, they performed at a Chabad menorah lighting in McAllen, Texas.

Their debut album, The Maggid, was released on January 19, 2016. A video for the title track was released on March 6.

== Musical style ==
Rogers Park perform folk, pop, and rock music with Jewish-themed lyrics in Hebrew and English. Their influences include Levi Robin, Matisyahu, Alex Clare, Moshav Band, The Rabbis' Sons, Diaspora Yeshiva Band, and Simon & Garfunkel, and they have covered songs by the Beatles, Leonard Cohen, and Shlomo Carlebach.

== Discography ==
=== Albums ===
- The Maggid (2016)
- Petersburg (2018)

=== Singles ===
- "Friendship Connection" (2013)
- "Sukkah's Falling" (2014)
- "Beggar Woman" (Moshe Yess cover; ft. Ruby Harris) (2014)
- "The Holy One" (2015)
- "Shared Hearts" (2015)
- "Pushka" (A cappella version) (2016)
- "Blessings" (2019)
- "Oh Hannukah!" (2019)

=== Music videos ===
- "Sukkah's Falling" (2014)
- "Shared Hearts" (ft. Libenu) (2015)
- "Golden Crown" (2015)
- "The Maggid" (2016)
- "Harninu" (2016)
- "Ki Hinei Kachomer" (2017)
- "Geulah" (2018)
- "Blessings" (2019)
