= Misplaced (album) =

Studio album by Moshav
- Released: August 8, 2006
- Genre: Jewish rock, folk, world music
- Length: 48:11
- Label: Jewish Music Group
- Producer: Ron Aniello; David Kopp

Moshav chronology
Malachim (2005)	Misplaced (2006)	Dancing in a Dangerous World (2010)

Misplaced is the sixth studio album by Jewish rock band Moshav. It was produced by Ron Aniello and mixed by Brendan O'Brien, and was released on August 8, 2006 by Jewish Music Group.

== Production ==
The album was produced by Ron Aniello and David Kopp and mixed by Brendan O'Brien, with engineering by Trina Shoemaker and Clif Norrell. In addition to Moshav, the album features accompaniment by pianist Aaron Embry, guitarist C Lanzbom of Soulfarm, and drummer Matt Chamberlain of Critters Buggin. Musically, the album expands on the band's previously established folk sound with elements of worldbeat and the use of electronic effects.

== Release and reception ==
The album was released on August 8, 2006. Hal Horowitz of AllMusic gave it 3.5 out of 5 stars, saying, "Some material is a bit undercooked and/or sappy, but in general this makes an excellent introduction to a group that, along with Matisyahu, has the talent to introduce the Western world to a vibrant and innovative combination of styles." Ben Jacobson of The Jerusalem Post named it one of the best Jewish albums of 5767 (2006–2007), saying the band had "finally made good on their threat to make it big in the New World with this effort...Every spiritual guitar pop song is pushed to its dramatic edge."

== Track listing ==
1. "The Only One" (David Kopp) – 3:54
2. "Closer" – 4:19
3. "When I'm Gone" (Ron Aniello) – 4:33
4. "Misplaced" – 3:58
5. "Cold Cry" (Aniello) – 3:33
6. "Hallelu" (Kopp) – 2:49
7. "Lift Up Your Head" (Aniello) – 4:37
8. "The Streets of Jerusalem" (Larry John McNally) – 3:27
9. "Jockey Full of Bourbon" (Tom Waits cover) – 3:18
10. "Heart Is Open" – 3:46
11. "Stand Up" (Aniello) – 2:53
12. "Abba Shimon" – 4:56
13. "Dream Again" (Aniello) – 2:08

== Personnel ==
=== Moshav Band ===
- Yehuda Solomon – lead vocals, percussion
- Duvid Swirsky – vocals, guitar, bass, percussion
- Yosef Solomon – bass

=== Additional musicians ===
- Ron Aniello – bass, guitar, keyboards
- C Lanzbom – guitar
- Aaron Embry – melodica, piano, zither
- Nimrod Nol – violin
- Jagonnathan Ramaamoorthy – violin
- Jesse E. String – cello
- Matt Chamberlain – drums, percussion
- Gidon Shikler – percussion, backing vocals

=== Technical personnel ===
- Ron Aniello – composer, engineer, management, mixing, producer
- David Kopp – composer, producer, programming
- Brendan O'Brien – mixing
- Trina Shoemaker – engineer
- Clif Norrell – engineer
- C Lanzbom – engineer
- Jay Goin – engineer
- Todd Spitzer – engineer
- Kenny Takahashi – engineer
- Larry John McNally – composer
- Joey Peters – engineer, programming, project assistant
- Glenn Pittman – assistant engineer
- James Rudder – engineer
- Ian Suddarth – assistant engineer
- Tom Syrowski – assistant engineer
- Summer Ray Brown – project assistant
- Lori Carfora – project assistant
- Richard Foos – project assistant
- Leonard Korobkin – project assistant
- Joshua Mazalian – project assistant
- David McLees – project assistant
- Patrick Milligan – project assistant
- Deborah Radel – project assistant
- Yehuda Remer – project assistant
- Dean Schachtel – project assistant
- Candy Shipley – project assistant
- Stuart Wax – project assistant
