= Noah Solomon =

Israeli–American musician (born 1973)

- Born: June 9, 1973 (age 53); San Francisco, California, U.S.
- Origin: The Bronx, New York
- Genres: Jewish rock, folk rock, world music
- Occupations: Singer, songwriter, composer, guitarist
- Instruments: Vocals, guitar, mandolin
- Years active: 1990–present
- Member of: Soulfarm, Lanzbom Solomon
- Website: www.soulfarm.com

Noah Solomon Chase (born June 9, 1973) is an Israeli–American musician, best known as the lead singer, guitarist, and mandolinist for the Jewish rock band Soulfarm.

== Early life ==
Chase was born in Northern California before moving with his family to Mevo Modi'in, Israel, a communal village founded by musician and spiritual leader Rabbi Shlomo Carlebach, who frequently visited the village. He comes from a family of musicians; his father, Ben Zion Solomon, was a founding member of Diaspora Yeshiva Band (whose debut album features Chase as a child soloist), while his brothers include Moshav Band's Yehuda Solomon and Hamakor's Nachman Solomon.

He began seriously pursuing music as a teenager. At age 16, he was seen practicing by Carlebach, who invited him to play at some of his shows. He subsequently became Carlebach's official guitarist for the last two years before his death in 1994.

== Career ==
=== Soulfarm ===
Solomon met American guitarist and fellow Carlebach disciple C Lanzbom at a Purim party in Mevo Modi'im, and attended a music class taught by him in Jerusalem in the 1980s. The two later moved to New York City and formed Inasense (later Soulfarm) in 1991. They have released eight albums, as well as five albums as Lanzbom Solomon. Alongside Moshav Band and Blue Fringe, they have been credited with advancing Jewish rock in the late 1990s and early 2000s.

=== Other activities ===
In 2013, Solomon provided musical accompaniment for Tisha B'Av services at The Brownstone in East Village, Manhattan, alongside Neshama Carlebach, Basya Schechter, and Naomi Less.

== Discography ==
=== With Soulfarm ===
- Inasense (1996)
- The Ride (1997)
- Get Your Shinebox (2000)
- Unwind (2003)
- Monkey Dance (2008)
- Holy Ground (2010)
- Blue and White (2012)
- The Bridge (2014)

==== With Lanzbom Solomon ====
- Tribute (1999)
- Butterfly (2001)
- Live at Club Tzorah (2003)
- Jerusalem Ridge (2004)
- The Chabad Sessions (2006)

=== Other work ===
- Diaspora Yeshiva Band, The Diaspora Yeshiva Band (1976) – vocals ("Esah Eynai")
- Neshama Carlebach, Soul (1996) – acoustic guitar, background vocals
- Neshama and Shlomo Carlebach, HaNeshama Shel Shlomo (1997) – background vocals
- Shlomo Carlebach, Days Are Coming (1999) – acoustic guitar ("L'Cha Dodi" and "Asher Bara"), background vocals
- Neshama Carlebach, Dancing With My Soul (2000) – background vocals, acoustic guitar ("Tshuasam"), composer ("Soulmate", "Before You Go")
- Neshama Carlebach, Ani Shelach (2001) – background vocals ("Eishet Chayil"), acoustic guitar ("Chasdei Hashem"), mandolin ("Eishet Chayil")
- Steve Hass, Traveler (2003) – main personnel, vocals
- Neshama Carlebach, Journey (2004) – background vocals
- Neshama Carlebach, One and One (2008) – songwriter ("Only Now", "Soulmate")
- Pioneers for a Cure, The Am Yisrael Chai Collection (2009) – featured artist ("El Yivne HaGalil")
- Various, A Cappella Treasury: Shabbos (2010) – primary artist with Sean Altman ("Havdalah - Hinei" and "Havdalah - Berachot")
- Cecelia Margules, New Sinai Sound (2012) – vocals ("Hava Nagila")
