= Safam =

American Jewish rock band

- Origin: Boston, Massachusetts
- Genres: Jewish rock, folk rock
- Years active: 1974–present
- Spinoff of: Zamir Chorale of Boston
- Members: Dan Funk; Joel Sussman; Robbie Solomon; Alan Nelson
- Website: safam.com

Safam is an American Jewish rock band from Boston, Massachusetts. Singer-songwriters Dan Funk, Joel Sussman, Robbie Solomon, and Alan Nelson formed the band in 1974.

They have released eleven studio albums, two greatest hits albums, and a double album of Hannukkah and Passover songs.

== Biography ==
Safam was formed in 1974 in Boston, Massachusetts. Dan Funk, Joel Sussman, and Alan Nelson were members of the Zamir Chorale of Boston, but wanted to try performing outside a choral setting. They met Robbie Solomon when he moved to Boston from Baltimore to attend the Berklee College of Music. They named the group Safam, Hebrew for "moustache", in reference to the facial hair they all had at the time.

Safam initially performed primarily traditional Hasidic and Israeli songs, particularly from the Hasidic Song Festival book, until they discovered Solomon and Sussman's talent at songwriting and began writing original music. One of their most popular original songs, "Leaving Mother Russia", was written by Solomon about the plight of Jewish refuseniks unable to leave the Soviet Union, and was debuted at a 1977 concert at the Hillel House at Rutgers University before appearing on the band's second album, Encore (1978). Years later, while they were performing the song at a rally at the Headquarters of the United Nations in New York City, Natan Sharansky, the song's inspiration, came onstage and stood with the band.

During the 1980s and 1990s, the band performed throughout the United States, England, the Caribbean, and Canada. In 2014, they performed at the Baltimore Hebrew Congregation and at Temple Beth Sholom in Fair Lawn, New Jersey.

== Musical style ==
Influenced by both traditional Jewish music and the American popular music of the 1960s and 1970s, Safam has a wide repertoire of songs and styles, including rock, pop, folk, Dixieland, calypso, Latin, Hasidic, and cantorial music. They have self-identified their sound as "Jewish-American", with member Dan Funk saying, "Our sound is a synthesis of our Jewish and American roots...People walk out feeling good about their Jewishness."

== Members ==
- Dan Funk – vocals
- Joel Sussman – vocals, piano, synthesizer, guitar
- Robbie Solomon – vocals, guitar, mandolin, flute
- Alan Nelson – vocals, synthesizer

== Discography ==
=== Studio albums ===
- Dreams of Safam (1976)
- Encore (1978)
- Sons of Safam (1980)
- Bittersweet (1983)
- Peace by Piece (1984)
- A Brighter Day (1986)
- The Greater Scheme of Things (1989)
- The Soul of Jewish America (1992)
- On Track (1993)
- After All These Years (1995)
- In Spite Of It All (1999)

=== Compilation albums ===
- Greatest Hits: Volumes I and II (1991)
- Greatest Hits: Volumes III and IV (2000)

=== Holiday albums ===
- Songs for the Jewish Holidays (1994)
- The Chanukah/Passover Collection (2003)
