= Adam Wexler =

American-Israeli musician (born 1956)

Adam Wexler אדם וקסלר
- Born: 1956 (age 69–70); Minneapolis, Minnesota
- Origin: Bat Ayin, Israel
- Genre: Jewish rock
- Instruments: Bass guitar, vocals
- Years active: 1977–present
- Formerly of: Diaspora Yeshiva Band, Reva L'Sheva

Adam Wexler (Hebrew: אדם וקסלר) is an American-Israeli musician best known as the bassist for Jewish rock groups Diaspora Yeshiva Band and Reva L'Sheva.

== Biography ==
Wexler grew up in Minneapolis, Minnesota, and started playing at age five. He is a cousin of singer-songwriter Peter Himmelman.

In 1975, Wexler became one of the founding members of the Diaspora Yeshiva Band, along with Avraham Rosenblum, Ben Zion Solomon, Simcha Abramson, Ruby Harris, and Gedalia Goldstein. The group, which played rock and bluegrass with Jewish lyrics, released six albums before disbanding in 1983.

Wexler was an associate of Rabbi Shlomo Carlebach, performing on several albums in the 1980s and early 1990s. Shortly after Carlebach's death in 1994, Wexler and fellow Carlebach devotee Yehuda Katz co-formed the band Reva L'Sheva. Combining a Carlebach influence with a jam band rock sound, the band was a forebear of the post-Carlebach Jewish rock scene, preceding bands like Moshav, Soulfarm, and Blue Fringe. The band released six studio albums before disbanding in 2004.

== Child molestation case ==
On December 23, 2004, Wexler was indicted and later jailed on charges he had sexually abused an eight-year-old girl in his neighborhood. The charges, most of which Wexler admitted to, included three instances of "rape, indecent acts, and indecent assaults" committed between 1994 and 1996.

== Discography ==
=== Credits ===
- Was Credited in Raw tape #5 by Reverse Chronological for the song Suburban Sprawl (2003-2004)

=== Solo albums ===
- A Million Voices (2005)

=== With Diaspora Yeshiva Band ===
- The Diaspora Yeshiva Band (1976)
- Melave Malka with the Diaspora Yeshiva Band (1977)
- At the Gate of Return (1978)
- Live From King David's Tomb (1980)
- Land of Our Fathers (1981)
- Diaspora Live on Mt. Zion (1982)
- Live at Carnegie Hall (1992)
- The Diaspora Collection (2000)

=== With Shlomo Carlebach ===
- Shlomo Sings with the Children Of Israel (Hiney Anochi V'hayeladim) (1989)
- The Gift of Shabbos (1995)
- Open Your Hearts (Music Made From The Soul, Vol. 1) (1986 Recordings) (1997)
- Holy Brothers and Sisters (Music Made From The Soul, Vol. 2) (1986 Recordings) (1997)

=== With Reva L'Sheva ===
- Higia HaZman (1996)
- Kumu (1998)
- Etz Chaim Hee: Secrets (1999)
- Avahat Chinam: One Love (2001)
- 10: Live (2004)
- V'Sham Nashir (2005)
