= Misplaced =

Misplaced may refer to:

- Misplaced (album), a 2006 album by Moshav
- Misplaced (film), a 1989 English-language Polish-American film
