= The House of Love and Prayer =

Synagogue founded by Shlomo Carlebach in the 1960s

Coordinates: 37.7842°N 122.4591°W

Religion
- Affiliation: Hasidic Judaism (former)
- Ecclesiastical or organizational status: Synagogue (1967–1978)
- Status: Abandoned

Location
- Location: 347 Arguello Boulevard, Richmond, San Francisco, California
- Country: United States
- Interactive map of The House of Love and Prayer

Architecture
- Founder: Rabbi Shlomo Carlebach; Rabbi Zalman Schachter

The House of Love and Prayer was a Hasidic Jewish congregation and synagogue, located at 347 Arguello Boulevard, in the Richmond district of San Francisco, California, in the United States.

Founded in spring/April 1968 by rebbe Shlomo Carlebach, the congregation had a short existence, lasting just ten years. Despite its Hasidic origins, the rituals of worship were inspired by the American counterculture movement, and attracted young, non-affiliated Jews. The congregation eventually disbanded, and some of the congregants relocated to Israel, founding Moshav Mevo Modi'im in 1975.

== History ==
Carlebach, a rabbi and singer-songwriter founded a synagogue inspired by the counterculture of the 1960s. Carlebach called his congregants "holy hippielech" ("holy hippies"). Many of Carlebach's followers soon began practicing Judaism according to the Orthodox tradition.

A second house, located at 1456 9th Avenue, in the Sunset district, was acquired during the early 1970s and served as a yeshiva for the congregation. This was after the first House, which was a commune and synagogue on Arguello Blvd., was closed on Dec. 4,1970.

Carlebach's synagogue inspired the creation of a musical presented by the National Yiddish Theatre titled "The House of Love and Prayer". Carlebach's daughter, Neshama Carlebach was among the production's collaborators.

== See also ==
- Carlebach movement
- Moshav (Band)
- History of the Jews in the United States
- List of synagogues in the United States
