= Heedoosh =

Israeli-American Jewish hard rock band

Heedoosh חידוש
- Origin: New York City
- Genres: Jewish rock, alternative rock, hard rock, grunge
- Years active: 2005–present
- Members: Yaniv Tsaidi; Yahav Tsaidi; Dror Shimoni; Shaya Rubenstein; Rafi Gassel; Ari Leichtberg
- Past members: Daniel Engelman; Guy Engelman; Gary Levitt; Yoshie Fruchter; Donni Rothchild; Eli Massias; Avi Hoffman; Meir Weinberg

Heedoosh (Hebrew: חידוש; "revelation") is an Israeli-American Jewish hard rock band from New York City. They were formed in 2005 by brothers Yaniv and Yahav Tsaidi, and released their debut album, Meumkah Delibah ("Depth of the Heart"), in 2006.

== History ==
Heedoosh was founded by brothers Yaniv and Yahav Tsaidi, who were born in Israel but grew up in Detroit with Yemenite-Moroccan parents. Yaniv began his career as a Hasidic pop singer in Chicago, recording two solo albums and performing on the 2004 Am Yisrael Chai tour alongside Reva L'Sheva and Adi Ran; eventually, however, he decided to take his music in a rock direction.

The Tsaidis formed Heedoosh in New York City in 2005, collaborating with Brooklyn-based producer/guitarist Eli Massias and drummer Ari Leichtberg. That same year, they performed at the Triad Theater, played the Jewish music festival Yidstock at Monticello Raceway, and opened for Badfish.

Their debut album, Meumkah Delibah, was released on May 9, 2006. Ben Jacobson of The Jerusalem Post listed it as the number one Jewish album of the year, describing the songs "Etz Hayim," "Lev Tahor," "Bein Mayim L'Yayin" and "The Purim Song" as "among the greatest rock songs ever to focus on Jewish themes." After a brief hiatus, the band returned in December and performed at New York's Lion's Den alongside Hamakor.

In 2008, the band relocated to Israel with a new lineup, including lead guitarist Dror Shimoni, guitarist Shaya Rubenstein, and bassist Rafi Gassel, who had previously played with Yaniv in the American band Rashan. They performed their first Israeli concert in June at the Canaan Land club in downtown Jerusalem.

== Musical style ==
Heedoosh plays a grunge style influenced by Oasis, Nirvana, Radiohead, and Alice in Chains, with Jewish-influenced Hebrew lyrics.

== Members ==
Current members

- Yaniv Tsaidi – vocals
- Yahav Tsaidi – guitar, vocals
- Dror Shimoni – lead guitar
- Shaya Rubenstein – guitar
- Raffi Gassel – bass
- Ari Leichtberg – drums

Former members

- Daniel Engelman – bass
- Guy Engelman – guitar
- Meir Weinberg (Mizrach) – guitar / backing vocals
- Gary Levitt – bass
- Yoshie Fruchter – guitar (Zion80, Soulfarm)
- Donni Rothchild – guitar
- Eli Massias – guitar
- Avi Hoffman – bass (Blue Fringe)

== Discography ==
Albums

- Meumkah Delibah (2006)
