= Ashira =

Ashira may refer to:

- Ashira (band), Israeli Jewish rock band
- Evans Ashira (born 1969), Kenyan boxer

== See also ==
- Bu Ashira, neighborhood of Manama, Bahrain
