= Soulfarm discography =

The following is a discography of the band Soulfarm.

== Albums ==
=== As Inasense ===
- Inasense (1996)
- Live in Berlin – Volume 1 (1997, cassette only EP)
  - Recorded live at the Haus der Kulturen der Welt, Berlin, Germany, 23 November 1996
- The Ride (1997)
- Get Your Shinebox (2000)

=== As Soulfarm ===
- Live at Wetlands (2000)
  - Live album recorded on March 20, 2000, at the Wetlands Preserve
- Scream of the Crop (2001, compilation)
- Live in Berlin – Volume 2 (2001)
- Unwind (2003)
- Monkey Dance (2008)
- Holy Ground (2010)
- Blue and White (2012)
- The Very Best of Carlebach, Chabad, and Breslev (2014)
- The Bridge (2014)
- Lost and Found (2015)

=== As Lanzbom Solomon ===
C Lanzbom and Noah Solomon also released a series of albums as a duo.

- A Tribute (1999)
- Butterfly (2001)
- Live @ Club Tzorah (2003)
  - Live acoustic set recorded live at Club Tzora, September 2002
- Jerusalem Ridge (2004)
- The Chabad Sessions (2006)

== Compilation appearances ==
Year	Album	Contribution
2007	Best of the Celebrate Series (Craig 'N' Co.)	"Ani L'dodi"

== Singles ==
Year	Song	Album
2013	"Unwind"	The Bridge
2013	"Walk With Me"	The Bridge
2013	"Who Knows"	The Bridge
2015	"Eretz Nehederet"	Non-album singles
2015	"Gam Ki Elech"	Non-album singles

== Music videos ==
Year	Song
2011	"Ready to Shine"
2012	"Novocaine"
2012	"Set Me Free"
2013	"Shine a Light"
2013	"Hevel"
2013	"Relax Your Mind"
2013	"Unwind"
2013	"Walk With Me"
2013	"Who Knows"
2015	"Gam Ki Elech"
