= Archibald's Next Big Thing =

American animated television series

- Promotional poster
- Created by: Tony Hale
- Based on: Archibald's Next Big Thing by Tony Hale, Tony Biaggne and Victor Huckabee
- Developed by: Tony Hale; Drew Champion; Jacob Moffat
- Directed by: Adam Gunn
- Voices of: Tony Hale; Adam Pally; Chelsea Kane; Jordan Fisher; Kari Wahlgren; Rosamund Pike
- Narrated by: Rosamund Pike
- Theme music composer: Distant Cousins
- Composer: Matthew Janszen
- Country of origin: United States
- Original language: English
- No. of seasons: 6
- No. of episodes: 50

Production
- Executive producers: Tony Hale; Eric Fogel (S2)
- Running time: 12 minutes
- Production company: DreamWorks Animation Television

Original release
- Network: Netflix
- Release: September 6, 2019 – March 20, 2020
- Network: Peacock
- Release: February 18 – October 14, 2021

Archibald's Next Big Thing (known as Archibald's Next Big Thing Is Here! starting in its third season) is an American children's animated sitcom created by Tony Hale for Netflix and Peacock. The plot revolves around Archibald Strutter, a positive chicken who often goes astray, but always finds his way back home.

The series debuted on September 6, 2019, on Netflix. Its second season was released on March 20, 2020.

On January 26, 2021, a new series was announced, which saw the series move to Peacock and rebrand as Archibald's Next Big Thing Is Here!, which premiered on February 18, 2021. The second season premiered on April 22, 2021, the third on July 15, 2021, and the fourth on October 14, 2021.

== Voice cast ==
Main

- Tony Hale as Archibald Strutter
- Adam Pally as Sage Strutter, Archibald's older brother who enjoys the outdoors
- Chelsea Kane as Loy Strutter, Archibald's sister who likes inventing things and doing science
- Jordan Fisher as Finly Strutter, Archibald's brother who likes singing, dancing and art
- Kari Wahlgren as Bea, Archibald's best friend and sidekick
- Rosamund Pike as the Narrator

Recurring

- Kari Wahlgren as Murph, Cheryl, Aunt Violet, Aunt Beatrice, Grandma Ashley, Martha Von Gobblesberg, Me-Maw, Ms. Blue, Old Cat Lady, Skipper Bellhop, Tanya
- Roger Craig Smith as Cousin Ashley, Mayor Fowler, Brock, additional voices
- Kevin Michael Richardson as Ronald, Moe, Dave, additional voices
- Eric Bauza as Mikael, Nitro Ned, additional voices
- Casey Wilson as Wendi Powers, a reporter
- Charlie Dell as Ed, an old rooster and Dixie's husband
- Karly Rothenberg as Dixie, an old chicken and Ed's wife
- Matty Cardarople as Preston, a bird who works various jobs
- Chris Parnell as Dr. Fluffberg
- Gary Cole as Officer Jones, a owl police
- Lauren Blumenfeld as Roxlyn, Archibald's unicorn pen pal
- Aaron LaPlante as Gorbit, a goat

Guest

- JP Karliak as Mr. Hackensack

Notable guest stars

- Christine Baranski as Madame Baroness, a glamorous singer
- "Weird Al" Yankovic as Jasper
- RuPaul as Jonathan Jagger, a fashion designer llama
- Sally Phillips as Flurbin, a sheep live in Hoofhöven that appears in "Mountain Mayhem"
- Julia Louis-Dreyfus as Claire, an astronaut monkey that appears in "The Chicken Has Landed" who actually has a fear of space
- Adam Ray as Johnny Hawkstorm, Dilbert Tuxington III, snail husband Larry
- Joel McHale as Jean Pierre
- Taylor Trensch as Archibald's singing voice
- Jane Lynch as Dotty Culpepper
- Henry Winkler as Herman Sherman
- John O'Hurley as Dr. Eggleston
- Rachael Ray as the Krak-hen
- Justin Long as Mr. Skunkmeyer
- Ana Gasteyer as Mimsy
- Marieve Herington, Kat Palardy and Kari Washlgren as the Flamingo Sisters (Ricotta, Brie and Feta) that appears in "A Taste of Crackridge"
- Karly Rothenberg as Crostini, snail wife
- Laraine Newman as Suzie, a cow lady that appears in "The Chair Museum"
- Jim Rash as Fritz, a captain anteater that appears in "Impromptu Cruise"
- Lori Alan as Gale St. Salty, Walker
- Kate McKinnon as Jojo, a bat that appears in "Power Play" and minor in "Zoom Boomer"

== Episodes ==
=== Archibald's Next Big Thing ===
==== Series overview ====
Season	Episodes	Originally released
1	13	September 6, 2019
2	13	March 20, 2020

=== Season 1 (2019) ===
No. overall	No. in season	Title	Directed by	Written by	Original release date
1	1	"Chicken at Sea"	Eric Fogel	Drew Champion and Jacob Moffat	September 6, 2019
1	1	"The Keymaster"	Brian Hatfield	Eric Fogel	September 6, 2019
Chicken at Sea: Archibald meet Ronald, sails the seas to help a group of turtles in danger. The Keymaster: It's Archibald to the rescue when the citizens of Crackridge report a series of thefts.
2	2	"Best in Showbot"	Andrew Collins	Drew Champion and Jacob Moffat	September 6, 2019
2	2	"The Secret of Madame Baroness"	Steve Trenbirth	Julia Prescott	September 6, 2019
Best in Showbot: An accident damages Loy's robot named Steve, and fear causes Archibald to end up inside it in the Crackridge Tournament of Robots. The Secret of Madame Baroness: Archibald finds a job as a doorman in Madame Baroness's home.
3	3	"The Oath of the Compass"	Brian Hatfield	Drew Champion and Jacob Moffat	September 6, 2019
3	3	"Garbage Fruit"	Andrew Collins	Kevin Kramer	September 6, 2019
The Oath of the Compass: Archibald forgets to send the invitations to Loy's party and must act quickly. Garbage Fruit: Archibald loses his vision for a while and learns to trust his other senses.
4	4	"Glide & Gobble"	Steve Trenbirth	Drew Champion and Jacob Moffat	September 6, 2019
4	4	"Wheelie, No Hands"	Brian Hatfield	Eric Fogel	September 6, 2019
Glide & Gobble: Archibald and his brothers must find a way out of a cave with help of Jasper the giraffe. Wheelie, No Hands: Archibald he joins a two cycling club called the Bikers and the Birds, and discovers a hidden talent.
5	5	"The Missing Piece"	Steve Trenbirth	Drew Champion and Jacob Moffat	September 6, 2019
5	5	"The Scotchman"	Andrew Collins	Julia Prescott	September 6, 2019
The Missing Piece: Archibald participate in a treasure hunt to find the last piece of the puzzle. The Scotchman: Archibald becomes Superhopscotch's apprentice with the Scotchman.
6	6	"Mountain Mayhem"	Brian Hatfield	Kevin Kramer	September 6, 2019
6	6	"The Gator Spinner Max"	Andrew Collins	Jeff Trammel	September 6, 2019
Mountain Mayhem: As part of a citizen exchange contest, Archibald moves to Hoofhöven for a week. The Gator Spinner Max: Archibald finds a practical use for Cousin Ashley's new invention.
7	7	"Dino-Can-Do"	Adam Gunn and Steve Trenbirth	Eric Fogel	September 6, 2019
7	7	"The Big Bad Bug"	Brian Hatfield	Julia Prescott	September 6, 2019
Dino-Can-Do: A new resident tries to adapt to Crackridge, but it's no easy task for the poor Calhoun the dinosaur. The Big Bad Bug: Archibald faces his fear of the basement with a new friend Benny.
8	8	"Stuck in Skates"	Andrew Collins	Drew Champion and Jacob Moffat	September 6, 2019
8	8	"Lawn Circles"	Andrew Collins	Drew Champion and Jacob Moffat	September 6, 2019
Stuck in Skates: An afternoon of ice skating with a pen pal Roxlyn ends in trouble. Lawn Circles: Crop circles appear in Crackridge, could it be the work of aliens?.
9	9	"Lights, Camera, Crackridge!"	Brian Hatfield	Eric Fogel	September 6, 2019
9	9	"Karaoke Dokey"	Adam Gunn	Julia Prescott	September 6, 2019
Lights, Camera, Crackeridge!: Archibald gets a job as a stunt double for a movie star in the new Johnny Hawkstorm movie. Karaoke Dokey: Loy becomes obsessed with Finly's karaoke game.
10	10	"The Enchanted Mansion"	Andrew Collins	Drew Champion and Jacob Moffat	September 6, 2019
10	10	"The Shell Game"	Brian Hatfield	Jen Bardekoff	September 6, 2019
The Enchanted Mansion: In search of Finly's magic wand, Archibald gets lost in a haunted mansion. The Shell Game: Archibald helps Freddie the hermit crab find a new shell.
11	11	"Strutter Sitting"	Adam Gunn	Julia Prescott	September 6, 2019
11	11	"Corny-O Chaos"	Brian Hatfield	Jen Bardekoff	September 6, 2019
Strutter Sitting: The Strutters organize a garage sale while they take care of other problems with a babies. Corny-O Chaos: Archibald enters a race to win an eternal supply of grain of Corny-O.
12	12	"The Chicken Has Landed"	Andrew Collins	Eric Fogel	September 6, 2019
12	12	"The Night of the Nibbler"	Adam Gunn	Bryan Belknap	September 6, 2019
The Chicken Has Landed: Archibald makes an unexpected trip to space and meet Claire. The Night of the Nibbler: He then turns detective to find a lost recipe that has been in Dolly's family for generations.
13	13	"The Primrose Classic"	Andrew Collins	Drew Champion and Jacob Moffat	September 6, 2019
13	13	"The Blimpateers"	Brian Hatfield	Benjamin Lapides	September 6, 2019
The Primrose Classic: The professional paper airplane launcher Munch hires Archibald as an assistant. The Blimpateers: In the air, Archibaled meets some birds that live in an airship.

=== Season 2 (2020) ===
No. overall	No. in season	Title	Directed by	Written by	Original release date
14	1	"The Mall Walkers"	Adam Gunn	Kevin Kramer	March 20, 2020
14	1	"Treasured Tattoo"	Adam Gunn	Nicole Belisle	March 20, 2020
The Mall Walkers: Archibald stumbles upon a crime with older birds in progress while trapped in a shopping mall. Treasured Tattoo: Ronald's tattooed map inspires Archibald to search for treasure.
15	2	"The Compost Elf"	Andrew Collins	Drew Champion and Jacob Moffat	March 20, 2020
15	2	"Meet Ya at the Stump"	Brian Hatfield	Katie Mattila, Drew Champion, Jacob Moffat, and Kevin Kramer	March 20, 2020
The Compost Elf: The Strutters it is filled with garbage when it gives false information about compost. Meet Ya at the Stump: Archibald and his friends speak out when their favorite place is threatened.
16	3	"A Taste of Crackridge"	Adam Gunn	Charlie Shoup	March 20, 2020
16	3	"The Bird and the Bee"	Brian Hatfield	Eric Fogel	March 20, 2020
A Taste of Crackridge: Archibald's stuffed is a hit among the residents of Crackridge. The Bird and the Bee: Archibald and Bea remember how they met.
17	4	"Lake Ball Pit"	Andrew Collins	Drew Champion and Jacob Moffat	March 20, 2020
17	4	"The Poppy Corn Festival"	Adam Gunn	Nicole Belisle	March 20, 2020
Lake Ball Pit: Archibald is a lifeguard at ball lake The Poppy Corn Festival: Archibald receives a lesson in the art of sarcasm with Loy and Cheryl.
18	5	"The Paperbirds"	Brian Hatfield	Drew Champion and Jacob Moffat	March 20, 2020
18	5	"Rock and Egg Roll"	Andrew Collins	Benjamin Lapides	March 20, 2020
The Paberbirds: A gang of thieves mistakes Archibald for a criminal mastermind. Rock and Egg Roll: Archibald discovers a rock with mysterious powers that give goosebumps.
19	6	"The Chair Museum"	Adam Gunn	Charlie Shoup	March 20, 2020
19	6	"The Legend of Crackerfoot"	Brian Hatfield	Benjamin Lapides	March 20, 2020
The Chair Museum: Archibald's plan to help Sage get her rocking chair back goes awry. The Legend of Crackerfoot: Archibald meet the legendary Crackerfoot
20	7	"Baritone Tea"	Andrew Collins & Adam Gunn	Drew Champion and Jacob Moffat	March 20, 2020
Archibald accidentally drinks all of Finly's enhancing tea on the eve of his brother's concert.
21	8	"Déjà Flu"	Brian Hatfield	Jennifer Bardekoff	March 20, 2020
21	8	"Crackridge Live!"	Andrew Collins	Drew Champion and Jacob Moffat	March 20, 2020
Déjà Flu: Archibald comes to the rescue when Loy, Saga and Finly catch the Déjà Flu Crackridge Live!: Archibald and Cousin Ashley take over the airwaves.
22	9	"House of the Future"	Adam Gunn	Eric Fogel	March 20, 2020
22	9	"Dr. Buttersocks"	Brian Hatfield	Benjamin Lapides	March 20, 2020
House of the Future: Loy makes improvements around the house with some robotic reinforcements. Dr. Buttersocks: Archibald becomes a puppet fighting superstar.
23	10	"The Royal Strutters"	Andrew Collins	Drew Champion and Jacob Moffat	March 20, 2020
23	10	"Impromptu Cruise"	Adam Gunn	Jennifer Bardekoff	March 20, 2020
The Royal Strutters: After pulling a sword from a tree, Sage is crowned king for a day. Impromptu Cruise: Archibald wins a vacation on a luxury cruise.
24	11	"The Four Flamingos"	Brian Hatfield	Drew Champion and Jacob Moffat	March 20, 2020
24	11	"The Roaring Rooster"	Andrew Collins	Benjamin Lapides	March 20, 2020
The Four Flamingos: Archibald eats too many beets and joins the lumberjacks in a log competition. The Roaring Rooster: Sage tries to earn all his rooster scout medals in one day.
25	12	"Dang, I'm Rich!"	Adam Gunn	Kevin Kramer	March 20, 2020
25	12	"Power Play"	Brian Hatfield	Jennifer Bardekoff	March 20, 2020
Dang, I'm Rich!: Cousin Ashley wants to be rich and buy a mansion. Power Play: Archibald explores Cracridge during a blackout with new friend Jojo the bat.
26	13	"Big Fun Town"	Adam Gunn	Jennifer Bardekoff and Benjamin Lapides	March 20, 2020
26	13	"New Crackridge"	Andrew Collins	Drew Champion and Jacob Moffat	March 20, 2020
Big Fun Town: Archibald and Bea plan another overdue honeymoon for Ed and Dixie. New Crackridge: Will the tornado reach Crackridge? Archibald is sure of it.

=== Archibald's Next Big Thing Is Here! ===
==== Series overview ====
Season	Episodes	Originally released
1	6	February 18, 2021
2	6	April 22, 2021
3	6	July 15, 2021
4	6	October 14, 2021

=== Season 1 (2021) ===
No. overall	No. in season	Title	Directed by	Written by	Original release date
1	1	"A Tiny Problem"	Adam Smith	Charlie Shoup	February 18, 2021
1	1	"Changing Lanes"	Steve Trenbirth	Drew Champion and Jacob Moffat	February 18, 2021
2	2	"Switched!"	Derek Moore	Eric Fogel	February 18, 2021
2	2	"Free-Range Chickens"	Adam Smith	Kevin Kramer	February 18, 2021
3	3	"The Fluffberg Method"	Derek Moore	Charlie Shoup	February 18, 2021
3	3	"Singing Tele-Grammers"	Steve Trenbirth	Drew Champion and Jacob Moffat	February 18, 2021
4	4	"Farewell General Sherwood"	Adam Smith	Drew Champion and Jacob Moffat	February 18, 2021
4	4	"Zoom Boomer"	Steve Trenbirth	Noëlle Lara	February 18, 2021
5	5	"Egg's Day Out"	Adam Smith	Noëlle Lara	February 18, 2021
5	5	"The Way of the Snake"	Steve Trenbirth	Charlie Shoup	February 18, 2021
6	6	"Castles and Caves"	Derek Moore	Eric Fogel; Drew Champion and Jacob Moffat	February 18, 2021

=== Season 2 (2021) ===
No. overall	No. in season	Title	Directed by	Written by	Original release date
7	1	"Unpoppable"	Adam Smith	Haley Mancini	April 22, 2021
7	1	"Slumber Party Hard"	Derek Moore	Noëlle Lara	April 22, 2021
8	2	"Maximum Overdue"	Steve Trenbirth	Drew Champion and Jacob Moffat	April 22, 2021
8	2	"Gator's Giving"	Steve Trenbirth	Charlie Shoup	April 22, 2021
9	3	"Crazy Maze"	Adam Smith	Charlie Shoup	April 22, 2021
9	3	"Super Sneaks"	Derek Moore	Noëlle Lara	April 22, 2021
10	4	"Robo Family"	Adam Smith	Charlie Shoup	April 22, 2021
10	4	"The Phantom of Pointy Peak!"	Derek Moore	Benjamin Siemon	April 22, 2021
11	5	"The Tooth Pirate"	Steve Trenbirth	Noëlle Lara	April 22, 2021
11	5	"Zups"	Steve Trenbirth	Drew Champion and Jacob Moffat	April 22, 2021
12	6	"A Star Is Hatched"	Adam Smith	Eric Fogel	April 22, 2021
12	6	"Say Cheese"	Derek Moore	Drew Champion and Jacob Moffat	April 22, 2021

=== Season 3 (2021) ===
No. overall	No. in season	Title	Directed by	Written by	Original release date
13	1	"Win a Day with Nitro Ned"	Steve Trenbirth	Charlie Shoup	July 15, 2021
13	1	"Lil' Chickies"	Adam Smith	Noëlle Lara	July 15, 2021
14	2	"Something Old, Something New"	Derek Moore	Drew Champion and Jacob Moffat	July 15, 2021
14	2	"The Ghoster"	Steve Trenbirth	Charlie Shoup	July 15, 2021
15	3	"The Saddle-Ridge Cup"	Adam Smith	Noëlle Lara	July 15, 2021
15	3	"Mayor Brock"	Derek Moore	Ellie Guzman	July 15, 2021
16	4	"Skunked!"	Steve Trenbirth	Benjamin Siemon	July 15, 2021
16	4	"Neighborhood Bird Watch"	Adam Smith	Nicole Belisle	July 15, 2021
17	5	"Tumbleweed Wrangler"	Derek Moore	Noëlle Lara	July 15, 2021
17	5	"The Extreme Bean Machine"	Steve Trenbirth	Eric Fogel	July 15, 2021
18	6	"The Undeliverables"	Adam Smith	Charlie Shoup	July 15, 2021
18	6	"Johnny Hawkstorm: Two Birds, One Stone"	Derek Moore	Drew Champion and Jacob Moffat	July 15, 2021

=== Season 4 (2021) ===
No. overall	No. in season	Title	Directed by	Written by	Original release date
19	1	"See You Next Plursday"	Adam Smith	Drew Champion and Jacob Moffat	October 14, 2021
19	1	"The Doppelganger"	Steve Trenbirth	Noëlle Lara	October 14, 2021
20	2	"8-Bit of Trouble"	Steve Trenbirth	Eric Fogel	October 14, 2021
20	2	"Found Feathers"	Derek Moore	Charlie Shoup	October 14, 2021
21	3	"Primetime Wendi Powers"	Ben McLaughlin	Noëlle Lara	October 14, 2021
21	3	"A Giant Problem"	Derek Moore	Ellie Guzman	October 14, 2021
22	4	"Earl Trappercorn"	Adam Smith	Drew Champion and Jacob Moffat	October 14, 2021
22	4	"Queen Bea"	Steve Trenbirth	Charlie Shoup	October 14, 2021
23	5	"King of Camp"	Derek Moore	Noëlle Lara	October 14, 2021
23	5	"Dancing Zombies"	Adam Smith	Charlie Shoup	October 14, 2021
24	6	"The Time Disrupter"	Steve Trenbirth	Eric Fogel	October 14, 2021
24	6	"The Time Disrupter"	Derek Moore	Drew Champion and Jacob Moffat	October 14, 2021
