= Hamakor (band) =

Israeli Jewish rock band

- Origin: Mevo Modi'im, Israel
- Genres: Jewish rock; alternative rock; grunge; trance fusion
- Years active: 2006–2015
- Past members: Nachman Solomon; Ben Katz; Yosef Solomon; Chemy Soibelman; Mendy Portnoy; Ben Frimmer; Jonathan Fialko; Lazer Grunwald; Bruce Burger; Jason Reich; Gavriel Saks; Eliezer Grundman; Jono Landon; Yakir Hyman; Zechariah Reich

Hamakor (Hebrew: המקור, "the source"; often typeset as haMakor and häMAKOR) was an Israeli Jewish rock band from Mevo Modi'im. They were formed in 2006 by lead singer Nachman Solomon and released two albums, The Source (2007) and World On Its Side (2010). The group's fluctuating lineup at different times included musicians like Bruce Burger, Chemy Soibelman, and Mendy Portnoy, and members would go on to participate in groups like G-Nome Project, Shlomit & RebbeSoul, and Zusha.

== History ==
=== Origins (2006–2007) ===
Lead singer and founder Nachman Solomon grew up in Mevo Modi'im, a communal village founded by Rabbi Shlomo Carlebach. He is the son of Diaspora Yeshiva Band violinist and founding member Ben Zion Solomon, while his brothers Noah, Yehuda, Meir, and Yosef formed the influential Jewish rock bands Moshav Band and Soulfarm. Nachman performed with his family regularly from a young age.

Hamakor was formed at Mevo Modi'im in January 2006 by a 19-year-old Solomon and lead guitarist Lazer Grunwald, although the latter was replaced with Yakir Hyman after he moved to the United States a few months later. During the band's first year together, they opened for Moshav Band and Aharit Hayamim and became monthly fixtures at the local Mike's Place.

=== The Source (2006–2010) ===
After a brief US tour and a year of frequent gigging around Jerusalem, HaMakor began recording their debut album, The Source, in the winter of 2006-07. At this point, the band included Zechariah Reich on bass. The album was released on May 11, 2007.

Shortly after recording the album, Hyman and Reich were drafted into the Israel Defense Forces. Reich was replaced by bassist Jonathan Fialko, while Hyman was briefly replaced by Reich's brother, Jason Reich, before established solo artist Bruce "RebbeSoul" Burger took over as lead guitarist. American keyboardist Ben Frimmer of Signal Path and Canadian drummer Jono Landon also joined around this time. In November, they performed at the Jerusalem launch party for Erez Safar's Shemspeed website, alongside Yood, Nosson Zand, missFlag, Aharit Hayamim, Sagol 59, Funkenstein, and Coolooloosh. The following Hanukkah, the band was recruited for a 10-city tour of Poland by the country's Chief Rabbi Michael Schudrich.

=== World On Its Side and dissolution (2010–2015) ===
The band released their second album, World On Its Side, on July 20, 2010. By this time, the band had acquired Yosef Solomon on bass, keyboardist Gavriel Saks, and drummer Eliezer Grundman. The album spawned two singles, "Illusion" and "Memories".

After a period of inactivity, the band resurfaced in 2014 with the Solomon brothers accompanied by guitarist Ben Katz, keyboardist Mendy Portnoy, and drummer Chemy Soibelman of The Groggers. The band released a single, "Lift Me Up", and announced plans for a third album of the same name. However, in a 2016 interview, Nachman Solomon confirmed that, following several member departures, the band had "kind of died out" a few years prior.

== Other projects ==
Several members of Hamakor have gone on to other musical endeavors:

- Following the group's dissolution, Nachman and Yosef Solomon, together with their brother Sruli, formed a folk rock group called the Solomon Brothers Band. The band has released two albums, 2017's Songs of Life and 2019's Change Another's Heart.
- Chemy Soibelman, Yakir Hyman, and Zecharia Reich formed the electronica jam band G-Nome Project with keyboardist Eyal Salomon. Soibelman left that group in 2018 and subsequently became the drummer for Zusha.
- Mendy Portnoy returned his focus to his band The Portnoy Brothers with his brother Sruli. Their debut album, Learn To Love, was released in 2016.
- Following his stint with the band, Bruce Burger collaborated with singer Shlomit Levi of Orphaned Land under the name Shlomit & RebbeSoul.
- Jason and Zechariah Reich were members of the folk band HOLLER! with vocalist Ami Yares.

== Musical style ==
Hamakor played a mix of grunge, trance fusion, folk, and classic rock with Hebrew and English lyrics. Band members cited influences from Pearl Jam, Phish, John Scofield, Disco Biscuits, Red Hot Chili Peppers,. Lead singer Nachman Solomon's songwriting was influenced by funk, reggae, jam band, and blues music, as well as the music of the Banai family, and the group's concerts often featured covers of The Who, Guns N' Roses, and The Grateful Dead, as well as Jewish artists like Shlomo Carlebach. Although many of Hamakor's lyrics were religious-themed, Nachman Solomon argued that non-Jews could also enjoy their music, saying, "The words are meaningful and spiritual, but we don't play mostly songs based on biblical verses".

== Members ==
=== Past members ===
- Nachman Solomon – lead vocals, rhythm guitar (2006–2015)
- Ben Katz – lead guitar, vocals (2014–2015)
- Yosef Solomon – bass guitar, vocals (2010–2015)
- Chemy Soibelman – drums (2014–2015)
- Mendy Portnoy – keyboards (2013–2014)
- Bruce Burger – guitar, vocals (2008–2010)
- Gavriel Saks – keyboards, vocals (2010–2014)
- Eliezer Grundman – drums (2010–2014)
- Ben Frimmer – keyboards, synths (2007–2010)
- Jonathan Fialko – bass guitar (2007-2010)
- Jason Reich – lead guitar (2007–2008)
- Jono Landon – drums (2006–2010)
- Yakir Hyman – guitar (2006–2007)
- Zechariah Reich – bass guitar (2006–2007)
- Lazer Grunwald – guitar (2006)

== Discography ==
Albums

- The Source (2007)
- World On Its Side (2010)

Singles

- "Illusion" (2010; World On Its Side)
- "Memories" (2011; World On Its Side)
- "Lift Me Up" (2014)
