= Sam Glaser =

American musician

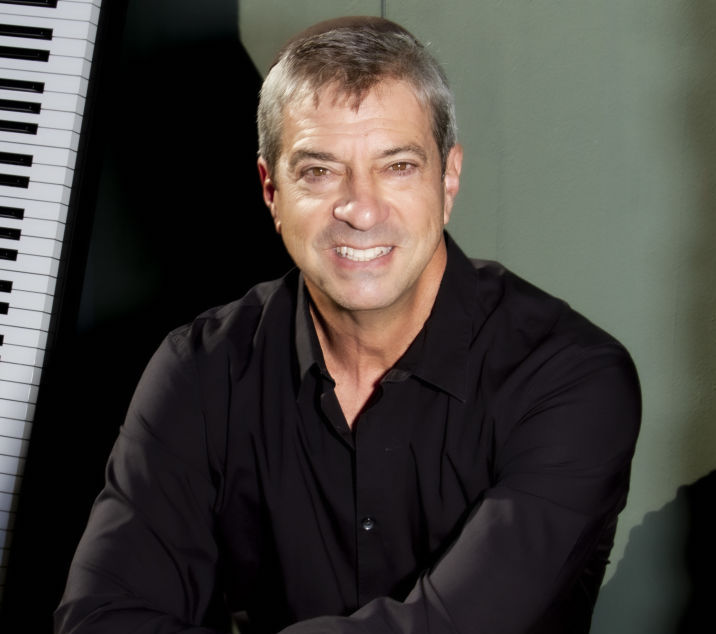

Background information
- Born: 1962 (age 63–64); Los Angeles, California, U.S.
- Genres: Jewish rock, classic rock, children's music
- Occupations: Performer, composer, producer, cantorial soloist, educator, and writer
- Instruments: Vocals piano
- Years active: 1990–present
- Label: Glaser Musicworks
- Spouse: Shira Glaser
- Website: samglaser.com

Sam Glaser (Hebrew: סם גלזר; born 1962) is an American Jewish performer, composer, producer, cantorial soloist, educator and writer.

Previously, Glaser served as an executive director of the Jewish Music Commission.

== Early life and education ==
Glaser was born to a Jewish family in Los Angeles. He grew up in Brentwood and Pacific Palisades, California, where he was exposed to jazz, classical and rock music. He regularly attended performances by the Los Angeles Philharmonic and was influenced by his mother's interest in Piano and musical theater. During his high school years, Glaser transitioned from classical piano to jazz and rock.

Glaser started composing and performing at the age of 7. He recorded his debut full-length album when he was 11 years old and composed his first national radio spot for Independence Bank at the age of 14.

Glaser earned a Bachelor of Arts degree in business with a minor in music from the University of Colorado Boulder. He also studied at the Berklee College of Music in Boston and later the University of California, Los Angeles Film Scoring Program.

== Career ==
After completing his education, Glaser worked in production and sales in the garment industry with his father for five years while simultaneously attempting to establish a career in rock music. During this period, he found that the demands of a full-time job left him with limited energy to pursue his musical ambitions, leading him to reevaluate his career path. In 1990 he went into music full time.

From 1992 to 2000, Glaser produced the annual American Jewish Song Festival, a songwriting competition, and later the American Jewish Idol singing contest. He served as music coordinator for the Department of Continuing Education at American Jewish University, where he was responsible for overseeing the music curriculum and directing the Cultural Arts program.

Since 1992, Glaser and his band has performed on his annual tours across 40–50 cities each year, appearing in over 1000 venues, including L.A.'s Greek Theatre, Crypto.com Arena, and Dodger Stadium, as well as Broadway and the White House. His tours have reached nearly every US state and throughout Australia, Asia, Europe and the Middle East. Sam has produced and recorded 26 albums of his own songs, primarily in Jewish rock and classic rock genres, as well as award-winning children's albums.

Glaser owns and operates Glaser Musicworks, his record company and recording studio, which produces music for film, television, audiobooks, and albums for other artists. He has served as in-house composer for the Warner Brothers Network and has scored for ESPN, PBS, Warren Miller Films and the SportsChannel.

Glaser has been involved in youth engagement, holding positions such as the director of the Yad b'Yad Youth Theater Troupe, a music specialist at Camp Ramah, and the music director for both the JCC Maccabi Games and the Brandeis Collegiate Institute.

In 2019, Glaser published his overview of spiritual living, The Joy of Judaism.

== Personal life ==
Glaser is an Orthodox Jew. He is married to Shira and they have three children together. He currently lives in the Pico-Robertson neighborhood of Los Angeles.

== Awards and recognition ==
Glaser is a 7-time winner of the ASCAP Award and his work has received awards from organizations such as Parent's Choice, the John Lennon Songwriting Contest, and the International Songwriting Competition. He has been named as one of the top ten Jewish artists in the U.S. by Moment magazine.
