= Jewish Rock Radio =

- Chesterfield, Missouri; United States
- Broadcast area: Internet

Programming
- Language: English
- Format: Jewish rock

Ownership
- Owner: Judaism Alive

History
- First air date: 2010

Links
- Website: Jewish Rock Radio station

Jewish Rock Radio is a non-profit Internet radio station founded in 2010. It is based in Chesterfield, Missouri.

== Development ==
Jewish Rock Radio is a non-profit Internet radio station founded by Jewish rock musician Rick Recht, who is the station's executive director. Launched in 2010, it was one of the first exclusively Jewish rock online radio stations in the United States, and runs programming 7 days a week and 24 hours a day. It was conceived as a global communications channel for Jews across the world. Recht was inspired to create Jewish Rock Radio after seeing how Christian rock radio stations operated. The station is a non-profit under the umbrella of the 501c3 charity "Judaism Alive", an organization established in 2009 "to strengthen Jewish identity and connection for youth through their love of music, musical instruments, and online interaction" according to The Jewish Week.

== Mobile app ==
In 2011 the station launched its mobile app, which is provided free of charge for both Apple and Android devices. More than 10,000 apps were downloaded in the first few months, providing over 500,000 listening minutes. In 2012 the app was named one of the top five Jewish music apps available on the Internet by The Jerusalem Post. The radio station became embedded in the websites of several top Jewish institutions.

== Live concerts ==
Jewish Rock Radio DJs include Seth Williams out of St. Louis, and has a focus on new up-and-coming artists. Many who work at the station also provide collaborative live shows at major music concerts. In February 2013 the station organized and hosted the first Jewish Rock Radio Rockfest National Music Festival at the St. Louis Jewish Community Center.

== Recognition ==
In 2011 the station was awarded a Slingshot Award, given as a part of the "annual compilation of the 50 most inspiring and innovative organizations, projects, and programs in the North American Jewish community". This includes serving as an advertising vehicle to Jewish-oriented businesses to directly communicate with their target constituencies.
