= Moshav (band) =

Israeli-American Jewish rock band

- Also known as: Moshav Band
- Origin: Mevo Modi'im, Israel
- Genres: Jewish rock, alternative rock, folk rock, world music
- Years active: 1996–present
- Labels: Jewish Music Group; Aderet; Sameach
- Spinoffs: Hamakor, Distant Cousins, Fools For April, Skyland, Solomon Brothers Band
- Members: Yehuda Solomon; Duvid Swirsky; Tamir Bar Zeli; Geoffrey Parry; Matt Cheadle
- Past members: Yosef Solomon; Karen Teperberg; Meir Solomon; Danny W. Roy Kariok; Nimrod Nol
- Website: moshavband.com

Moshav, formerly known as Moshav Band, is an Israeli-American Jewish rock band originating from Moshav Mevo Modi'im. Founded in 1996 by Yehuda Solomon and Duvid Swirsky, the group moved to Los Angeles in 2008 and have released ten studio albums. With a sound incorporating elements of alternative rock, folk, funk, and reggae, they were credited, alongside Soulfarm and Blue Fringe, with advancing Jewish rock in the early 2000s.

== History ==
=== 1996–2000: Formation and The Things You Can't Afford ===
Moshav was formed in Israel by neighbors Yehuda Solomon and Duvid Swirsky. The children of American-born parents, Solomon and Swirsky were raised in Mevo Modi'im, a moshav founded by musician and spiritual leader Rabbi Shlomo Carlebach, who lived in the community and became a role model and mentor for the boys. Solomon is the son of Ben Zion Solomon, a founding member of 1970s Jewish rock group Diaspora Yeshiva Band, and his siblings include Noah Solomon, who had previously started the band Soulfarm, and Yosef and Meir, who would later join Moshav. Swirsky and the Solomon brothers often performed on Ben Zion's albums and as part of Carlebach's backing band in their childhood and teens. They eventually began performing as a band in 1996, which was dubbed the Moshav Band by locals due to their place of origin.

As the Moshav Band, they developed a live following in the late 1990s among North American college students studying abroad in Israel. A group of American fans raised money for the band to tour college Hillel Houses in the United States. Two other fans, Canadian Hebrew University students Sig Shore and Justin Korda, convinced philanthropist and Seagram CEO Edgar Bronfman Sr. to fund the band's first full-scale tour in North America and the recording of their debut album, 1998's The Things You Can't Afford. The album was recorded in Los Angeles, where the band would officially relocate as of 2000.

=== 2000–2010 ===
Moshav continued to tour and release albums throughout the 2000s, performing internationally and at venues including Irving Plaza, House of Blues, B.B. King's Blues Club, the Knitting Factory, and The Bitter End. They played the 2003 Beit Shemesh Jewish Rock and Soul Festival alongside Shlomo Katz, Adi Ran, and Reva L'Sheva. In 2005, they released their fifth studio album, Malachim, as well as a greatest hits album, The Best of Moshav Band: Higher and Higher.

After changing their name from Moshav Band to simply Moshav, the group's mainstream profile was raised with the release of their sixth studio album, 2006's Misplaced, which was recorded with producer Ron Aniello, mixing engineer Brendan O'Brien, and musicians including drummer Matt Chamberlain, and was released by the Sony-affiliated Jewish Music Group (JMG) label. 2008 saw the band embark on a mini-tour of the East Coast with shows in Manhattan, Philadelphia, and New Jersey, followed by a series of concerts in Israel; during this time, the band acquired former Kelly Clarkson violinist Nimrod Nol. That summer, they performed at Vancouver Island's Big Time Out Festival alongside Matisyahu. In June 2009, they returned to Vancouver to perform at Granville Island Stage as part of a fundraising gala for Vancouver Hebrew Academy.

A seventh album, Dancing in a Dangerous World, was released in 2010. That same year, they gave a free public concert at United Hebrew Congregation in Chesterfield, Missouri.

=== 2010–2020 ===
In August 2012, the band launched a new tour with a show at Philadelphia's World Cafe Live. By this time, drummer Tamir Bar Zeli, guitarist Geoffrey Parry, and bassist Matt Cheadle has been added to the lineup, and the group became known for appearing at numerous benefits, fundraisers, and community events. In November 2013, they performed in Brooklyn's Park Slope neighborhood as part of the annual Sephardic Music Festival. Their eighth album, New Sun Rising, initially planned for release in late 2012, was ultimately released in 2014. In March of that year, they performed at Jewlicious Festival with Matisyahu, who was also featured on the album's single "World On Fire". That year also saw the release of Shabbat Vol. 1, an album of original, traditional, and Carlebach-composed songs recorded at the band's home studio in Los Angeles. A follow-up, Shabbat Vol. 2, would be released in 2018.

In 2017, the band performed at Philadelphia's Gershman Y to benefit the Center City Orthodox synagogue Mekor Habracha; they had previously raised money for the synagogue with a 2012 show at Union Transfer. They also performed at the annual Jeffersonville-based Jewish music festival The Camping Trip in 2016 and 2017, alongside acts including Zusha, Matisyahu, Soulfarm, Kosha Dillz, and Levi Robin. They were set to return to the festival in 2018, with a lineup including Gad Elbaz, Hebro, and G-Nome Project, before its suspension due to legal difficulties.

=== 2020–present ===
In November 2021, Moshav performed at a public menorah lighting organized by the Chabad Center for Jewish Life in Newport Beach, California; they were accompanied by the Corona del Mar High School drumline, and Rep. Michelle Steel was in attendance. They also performed at another Hanukkah event the following month, held at the Arneson River Theater in San Antonio, Texas.

In early December 2022, Moshav performed at the second annual "Shine a Light on Antisemitism" event in Times Square, alongside comedian Ariel Elias, rapper Nissim Black, former Miami Boys Choir member David Herskowitz, the Ramaz Upper School Choir, and the cast of Folksbiene's Fiddler on the Roof in Yiddish. Later in the month, they returned to Newport Beach for another Chabad Center for Jewish Life menorah lighting and gave a pair of concerts at Brooklyn Made and Rutgers University, the latter to raise money for the charity Tomchei Shabbos. In an interview with Jewish News Syndicate, Yehuda Solomon teased a new upcoming album entitled World on Fire.

In April 2023, the non-profit The Shabbat Inc. organized a two-week Passover program hosted at the Las Vegas Strip's Resorts World, featuring performances by Moshav, Shir Soul, Six13, and comedians Mark Schiff, Daniel Lobell, and Brian Kiley.

== Musical style and impact ==
=== Genre and sound ===
Moshav is known for an eclectic Jewish rock style that draws from alternative rock, folk rock, classic rock, pop rock, reggae, funk, country, bluegrass, jam band, nigunim, and Middle Eastern music, with lyrics in Hebrew and English. Yehuda Solomon has jokingly described the band's sound as "falafel -- we take a lot of different styles and make them all work together."

In 2003, The New York Times described Moshav and their sibling band Soulfarm as being influenced by the improvisatory nature of the Grateful Dead and The Allman Brothers Band, while their album Return Again had arrangements echoing folk rock artists Jack Johnson and Ben Harper. Other songs on Return Again have elements of Israeli folk, Celtic music, klezmer, and Latin music. The following album, Malachim (2005), continued a folk-influenced rock sound, split between jangle-driven pop rock and softer ballads and utilizing fiddle, mandolin, and hand drums. 2006's Misplaced saw the group expand into a more polished, production-heavy sound with worldbeat and electronic elements akin to Peter Gabriel. Their 2014 album Shabbat Vol. 1 featured a blend of reggae, Middle Eastern, and traditional folk music with instrumentation including bouzouki, banjo, cello, trumpet and oud.

Yehuda Solomon has been noted for his unique vocals, which variously emulate cantorial, Middle Eastern, and grunge singing styles, often drawing comparison to Eddie Vedder. His live performances are known to be exuberant and occasionally punctuated by "animalistic chants". Solomon has credited exposure to Sephardic music (by Moroccan and Yemenite Jewish friends), Ashkenazi cantorial singing, and American rockers like Vedder with influencing his voice. In contrast, co-vocalist Duvid Swirsky typically sings with a softer folk-inflected voice, sometimes compared to Bob Dylan and Peter Gabriel, and he and Solomon are known to utilize close vocal harmonies. Summit Daily News noted that the vocals on Misplaced progress from being "steeped in Persian and diminished scales" on early tracks to emulating a cappella and country styles on later tracks.

=== Influences ===
The members of Moshav were most prominently influenced by the teachings and folk music of childhood neighbor Shlomo Carlebach. Many of their songs are adapted from Carlebach compositions, and Yehuda Solomon has said that he and his brothers "learned how to deal with an audience" performing in Carlebach's live band. Besides for Carlebach and their father's work with Diaspora Yeshiva Band, they were also influenced by American artists of the 1960s and '70s that their parents played, including Bob Dylan, Bob Marley, Miles Davis, Neil Young, Van Morrison, Cat Stevens, Joni Mitchell, and Crosby, Stills, Nash & Young. Other cited influences have included American grunge band Pearl Jam and Pakistani Qawwali singer Nusrat Fateh Ali Khan. The band have covered songs by Paul Simon, Tom Waits, and Zion Golan.

=== Impact ===
As early as 2003, The Jewish Journal credited Moshav, Blue Fringe, and Soulfarm with "advancing Jewish rock", while Ben Bresky of the Cleveland Jewish News wrote that the band was "in the forefront of a post-Carlebach folk-rock movement." Later Jewish artists including Blue Fringe, Rogers Park, Jacob's Ladder, and The Weinreb Brothers have cited Moshav as an influence, while artists like Aryeh Kunstler and Shaindel Antelis have recorded covers of their songs.

== Members ==
=== Current members ===
- Yehuda Solomon — vocals, percussion
- Duvid Swirsky — vocals, guitar
- Tamir Bar Zeli — drums, percussion
- Geoffrey Parry — guitar
- Matt Cheadle — bass

=== Past members ===
- Nimrod Nol — violin
- Karen Teperberg — drums
- Danny W. — guitar
- Roy Kariok — guitar
- Oneg Shemesh — rhythm guitar, backing vocals
- Meir Solomon — guitar
- Yosef Solomon — bass

== Discography ==
=== Studio albums ===
- The Things You Can't Afford (1998)
- Days (1999)
- Lost Time (2001)
- Return Again (2002)
- Malachim (2005)
- Misplaced (2006)
- Dancing in a Dangerous World (2010)
- New Sun Rising (2014)
- Shabbat Vol. 1 (2014)
- Shabbat Vol. 2 (2018)

=== Live albums ===
- Live At B.B.King NYC (2003)

=== Compilation albums ===
- The Best of Moshav Band: Higher and Higher (2005)

=== Singles ===
- 2011: "Light the Way"
- 2013: "Chicki Boom"
- 2013: "K'Shoshana"
- 2013: "World on Fire" (ft. Matisyahu)
- 2021: "Rainmaker"
- 2022: "Adam" (Thank You Hashem ft. Moshav)

=== Music videos ===
- "Eliyahu Hanavi" (2005)
- "Bereishit" (2005)
- "World on Fire" (2013)
- "Chicki Boom" (2014)

== See also ==
- Reva L'Sheva
- Soulfarm
- Hamakor (band)
- Baal teshuva
