= Tomchei Shabbos =

Name for several unreelated Jewish charities

Tomchei Shabbos is the name for several Jewish charities in different communities, which are not all affiliated with one another. The Hebrew name means "supporters of the Sabbath." Thus, the charity's mission is to provide food and other supplies so that poor Jews can celebrate the Sabbath and the Jewish holidays.

== United States ==
=== Rockland County, New York ===
Tomche Shabbos of Rockland County has been providing food packages to the poor since 1973. Operating on Thursday nights, they gave out 202,256 lbs of chicken in 2013. They are also a registered 501(c) organization.

=== Bergen County, New Jersey ===
Tomchei Shabbos of Bergen County was founded by Chani Schmutter, Lori Frank, and Claire Strauss in Bergen County, New Jersey (Teaneck, Bergenfield, and Fair Lawn) in 1990. As of 2012, Tomchei Shabbos supported 180 Jewish families in the area.

=== Los Angeles, California ===
Tomchei Shabbos of Los Angeles was founded by three Orthodox rabbis in 1977 or 1978. A 2003 article in the Los Angeles Jewish Journal stated that over 200 Jewish families rely on the volunteer organization for weekly donations.

The organization provides numerous family services, such as job assistance, clothing, furniture, and emergency utility and rent payments; it also helps children obtain a Jewish education and directs people to social service organizations. They also provide food for the week, Shabbat, and the holidays.

As of February 11, 2016, Tomchei Shabbos of Los Angeles is helping close to 1,500 individuals on a weekly basis with food packages and store credit vouchers. They also assist over 2,800 individuals bi-annually with brand-new clothing. In addition, they assist 25 families monthly with furniture, 100 families monthly with diapers and hundreds of families annually with hardship assistance.

Tomchei Shabbos of Los Angeles is a d/b/a name of Touch of Kindness, a 501(c)(3) organization.

=== Miami, Florida ===
Tomchei Shabbos of Miami was started in 2009.

=== Queens, New York ===
Founded in 1979 by a group of young men in Forest Hills, and has since moved to Kew Gardens, Queens. It operates every Wednesday night, with volunteers from diverse Jewish backgrounds, arranging food packages which are then delivered to the needy, by many local volunteers. It is currently responsible for the delivery of approximately 350 packages weekly. With its low overhead and no salaries, most of the money goes directly into providing food for community members.
