= Distant Cousins (American band) =

American indie pop band

Distant Cousin
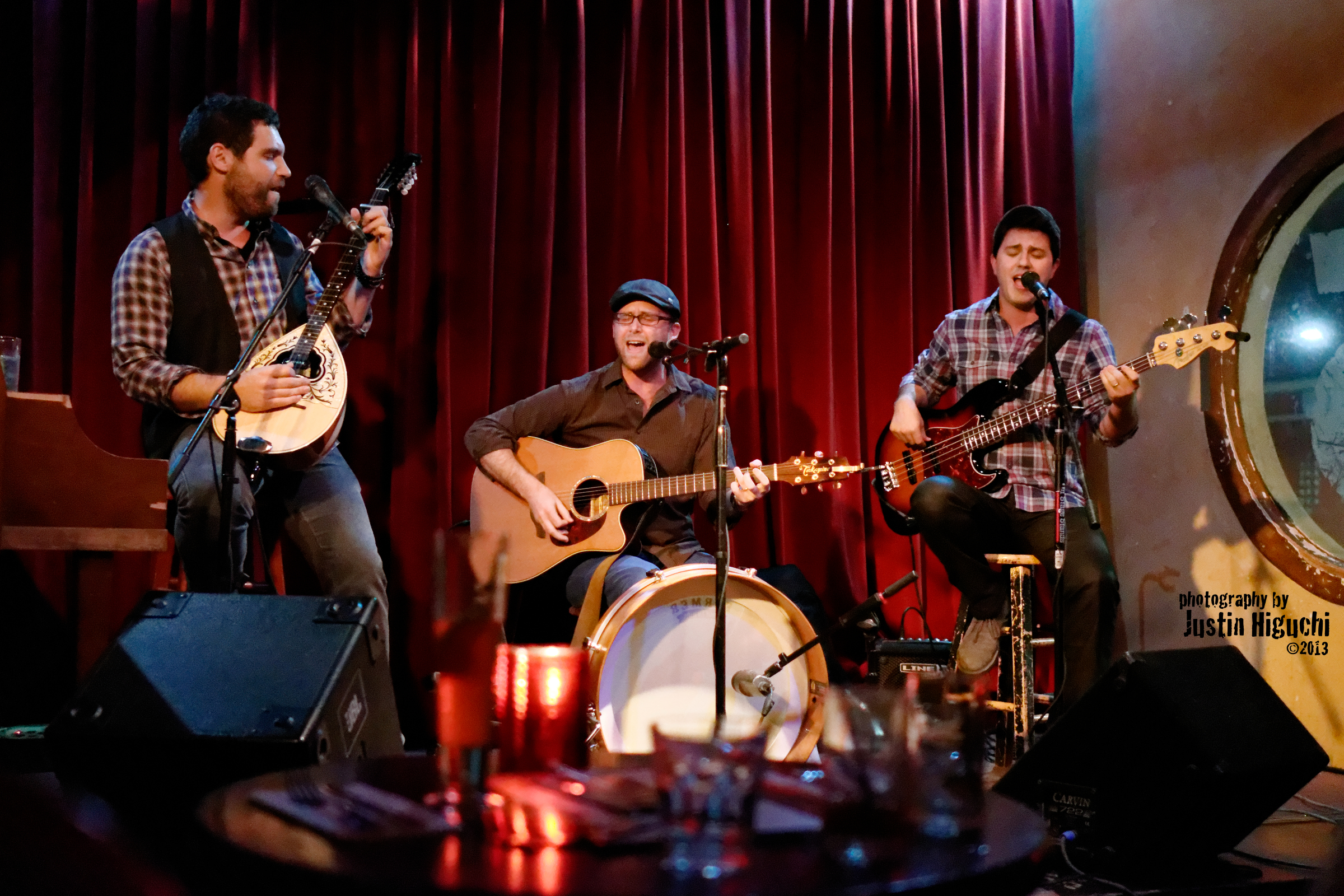
- Distant Cousins in 2013

Background information
- Also known as: DC
- Origin: Los Angeles, California, USA
- Genre: Indie pop
- Years active: 2012–present
- Label: Family First
- Spinoff of: Blue Fringe; The Wellspring; Moshav
- Members: Dov Rosenblatt; Duvid Swirsky; Ami Kozak
- Website: distantcousinsofficial.com

Distant Cousins is an American indie pop band from Los Angeles, California. Formed in 2013, the band is composed of Dov Rosenblatt, Duvid Swirsky, and Ami Kozak. Rosenblatt previously led the bands Blue Fringe and The Wellspring, while Swirsky is a founding member of Moshav. They released their debut self-titled EP on September 16, 2014, followed by a second self-titled EP in 2015. Several of their songs have been featured in film, television, and commercials.

== Background ==
Prior to forming Distant Cousins, Dov Rosenblatt was the lead singer of the Jewish rock band Blue Fringe, while Duvid Swirsky was a founding member of the band Moshav. Swirsky, Rosenblatt, and Kozak met in Los Angeles in 2012 while their respective bands were playing a show together. Upon hearing a song Swirsky and Rosenblatt had written, "When We Love", Kozak offered to produce it, and the three subsequently began playing together. The name Distant Cousins, a reference to the members' longtime familiarity with each other, was first used when writing a song for the 2013 film Coffee Town.

Their debut EP, the self-titled Distant Cousins EP, was released on September 16, 2014. A second EP of the same name was released the following year, and a debut full-length album, Next of Kin, released in 2019.

== Media appearances ==
- "Are You Ready (On Your Own)" appeared at the end of the 2014 film This Is Where I Leave You and the trailer of the 2019 animated film How to Train Your Dragon: The Hidden World.
- "Everybody Feels It" was used in a commercial for the German soft drink Lift and on the NBC medical drama Heartbeat.
- "On My Way" was used in Macy's "Denim Nation" ad campaign.
- "Raise It Up" appeared on the TV shows Graceland and Criminal Minds and in the 2015 comedy film 4th Man Out.
- "Fly Away" was used in The CW series Reign.
- "Burnin' Up" was featured in a trailer for the 2015 Will Ferrell comedy Daddy's Home.
- The band created a song for The Loud House Movie (2021), called “Let’s Get Lost Together”.
- The band has contributed music to several DreamWorks Animation projects, contributing theme songs to Archibald's Next Big Thing and Where's Waldo? and composing original songs for Kipo and the Age of Wonderbeasts.

== Discography ==
=== Albums ===
- Next of Kin (2019; Family First)
- Here & Now (live visual album; 2020; Family First)

=== EPs ===
- Distant Cousins EP (September 16, 2014)
- Distant Cousins EP (October 16, 2015; Family First)

=== Singles ===
- "Raise It Up" (2013)
- "Everybody Feels It" (2014)
- "Are You Ready (On Your Own)" (2014)
- "Burnin' Up" (2015)
- "Your Story" (ft. Jessie Payo of Jupiter Rising) (2015)
- "Taste of Tomorrow" (2015)
- "Get It to Me" (2017)
- "Famously" (2017)
- "Big" (2017)
- "Waking Up" (2017)
- "Something in the Air" (2017)
- "Lights On" (2018)
- "Running" (2018)
- "In My Blood" (2018)
- "Like Me" (2018)
- "Here & Now" (ft. Lindsey Ray) (2020)
- "Angelina" (2020)

=== Music videos ===
- "On My Way" (2014; dir. Loïc Guilpain)
- "Your Story" (2015; dir. Jon Danovic)
- "For A Moment" (2015)
- "Burnin' Up" (2016; dir. Nate Klein)
- "This Day On" (ft. Ada Pasternak) (2017; dir. David Schlussel)
- "Angelina" (2019; dir. Zoe Hu)
- "Here & Now" (ft. Lindsey Ray) (2020)
