= Ashira (band) =

Israeli Jewish rock band

Ashira אשירה
- Origin: Ramat Gan, Israel
- Genres: Jewish rock; blues; Irish folk
- Years active: 2006–present
- Members: Pnina Weintraub; Yael Teitz; Lia Bagrish; Maayan Schweitzer; Sapir Gizbar
- Past members: Hagit Tawil; Inbar Perser

Ashira (Hebrew: אשירה, fem. "I will sing") is an Israeli Jewish rock band based in Ramat Gan. They were formed at Bar-Ilan University in 2006 by violinist Pnina Weintraub and flautist Yael Taitz. They are notable for performing exclusively for women in accordance with the Jewish law of kol isha.

== Overview ==
Ashira was formed in 2006 in Ramat Gan by two Bar-Ilan University music students, violinist Pnina Weintraub and flautist Yael Taitz. Weintraub was frustrated that the school always hired male musicians for parties and Jewish holidays due to the need for separation, and additionally wanted to create an artistic outlet for other religious girls in Israel, so she approached her friend Taitz about forming an all-female band that would play exclusively for women. She and Taitz contacted Erez Barkai, a music teacher at Yeshurun High School in Petah Tikva who later became the band's musical producer; Barkai introduced them to guitarist Lia Bagrish and drummer Maayan Schweitzer, who joined alongside bassist Inbar Perser (Gessner). After a series of auditions and an initial singer who left, the band acquired lead vocalist Hagit Tawil (later replaced with Sapir Gizbar).

The band first gained attention performing at Ulpanim, Jewish seminaries and girl's schools, small halls, and various events as part of Sherut Leumi national service, before starting to write original songs together. Their first performance outside of Sherut Leumi was at the Israeli pub C'naan during Sukkot of 2008, attended by an audience of 300 women and girls. They would go on to perform at Bar-Ilan University and at various religious pubs, larger auditoriums, and arts centers in Israel, attracting both religious and secular audiences. In keeping with Jewish laws of modesty, they perform only for women and do not allow their concerts to be filmed.

After a period of minimal activity, the band announced in August 2014 that they had finished recording their debut album. Later in the year, it was announced that Inbar Perser would be leaving the group. A single entitled "Ashira" was posted to Facebook in late 2017, and an album of the same name was given a limited self-release in 2019. Outside of the group, Sapir Gizbar has recorded as a solo artist since 2020.

== Musical style ==
Ashira performs a mix of Jewish music, rock, blues, Irish folk, and occasionally hip hop; an Associated Press article compared them to The Chicks. Violinist Pnina Weintraub has argued that the band represents a new genre in the religious sector, saying "There’s no other band that plays the way we play," while bassist Inbar Perser has said, "We play lots of genres of music. We play everything that makes sense for the songs." Their lyrical repertoire incorporates covers of Israeli songs, Jewish Biblical texts, and original Hebrew lyrics with religious themes.

== Band members ==
=== Current ===
- Sapir Gizbar – lead vocals
- Lia Bagrish – guitar, vocals
- Pnina Weintraub – violin, vocals
- Yael Taitz – flute
- Maayan Schweitzer – drums

=== Former ===
- Hagit Tawil – lead vocals
- Inbar Perser (Gessner) – bass guitar

== Discography ==
=== Albums ===
- Ashira (2019; self-released)

=== Singles ===
- "Ashira" (2017)
