= Zamir Chorale of Boston =

The Zamir Chorale of Boston, founded in 1969, is a choral group that performs Jewish liturgical pieces, major classical works, music of the Holocaust, newly commissioned compositions, and Israeli, Yiddish, and Ladino folksongs. Zamir has been recognized by American Record Guide as “America’s foremost Jewish choral ensemble.” The documentary film Zamir: Jewish Voices Return to Poland, about the Chorale’s 1999 trip to Eastern Europe, was shown across the country on public television stations. Rose of Sharon Winter, Rovi, of The New York Times, called the film “an unforgettable video experience.”

Zamir has 21 recordings and has toured throughout the United States, as well as in Israel and Europe. In January 2006, Zamir was invited to perform at the United Nations General Assembly for the first International Day to Commemorate Victims of the Holocaust.

Zamir strives to develop future leaders in Jewish choral music. The Mary Wolfman Epstein Conducting Fellowship provides funding for young conductors to study Jewish choral music with Joshua Jacobson. Graduates of the program have gone on to conduct choirs of their own in Boston and beyond. Zamir also mentors other Jewish community choruses through joint rehearsals and performances.

== History ==
Zamir traces its lineage to the Hazomir Jewish Society for Literature and Music formed in Łódź, Poland in 1899. The success of the Łódź choir led to the formation of other Jewish choirs in Poland, Russia, and other parts of the world.

Millions of Jews immigrated to the U.S. in the late nineteenth and early twentieth centuries. Among the immigrants were choral singers and conductors who founded Jewish choirs, many of them singing Yiddish folk music. By the middle of the twentieth century, the Jewish community had grown more assimilated, and interest in Yiddish choirs waned. The birth of the State of Israel in 1948 rekindled interest in Jewish culture, and in 1960, the modern Zamir movement began with the founding of Zamir Chorale (New York) by Stanley Sperber and Chuck Kleinhaus. In 1969 Sperber invited Joshua Jacobson to start a Zamir Chorale in Boston. The Zamir Chorale (New York ) is currently one project of the Zamir Choral Foundation, which sponsors the Hazamir international Jewish teen choir (previously known as the international jewish high school choir), an annual Jewish choral festival, and commissions new works.

== Recent projects ==
On April 10, 2011, the Zamir Chorale of Boston performed a program entitled “Middle East Harmonies” at Harvard University’s Memorial Hall, co-sponsored by Zamir and by Northeastern University. Zamir performed with members of Bustan Abraham, a notable Israeli band who reunited for this concert after many years, and with the Boston City Singers, a youth chorus for inner-city youth in Boston.

Founder and Artistic Director Joshua Jacobson is retired Professor of Music and Director Emeritus of Choral Activities at Northeastern University, Visiting Professor of Jewish Music at Hebrew College, and author of Chanting the Hebrew Bible: The Art of Cantillation (Jewish Publication Society, 2002).

The Zamir Chorale of Boston is a choir-in-residence at Hebrew College in Newton, Massachusetts, and is funded in part by the Massachusetts Cultural Council and by Combined Jewish Philanthropies.

In 2012 the choir released a recording from their European tour "From Boston to Berlin" featuring three settings of "Adon Olam" by Louis Lewandowski. Kenneth Lampl, and Charles Davidson.
