= C Lanzbom =

American guitarist and songwriter

- Born: C Joseph Lanzbom
- Occupations: Guitarist, studio musician, songwriter, recording engineer
- Instrument: Guitar
- Years active: 1991–present
- Website: clanzbom.com

C Joseph Lanzbom is a Grammy-winning American guitarist and songwriter. He is known for co-founding the band Inasense (later renamed Soulfarm), with Noah Chase.

== Personal background ==
Lanzbom grew up in Lakewood Township, New Jersey, where he studied music and jazz guitar privately. He then went to the University of Miami to formally study composition and theory. His influences include Charlie Christian, B. B. King, Duane Allman, Pat Metheny, and T Bone Burnett.

== Professional background ==
In 1991, Lanzbom established the band Inasense (later renamed Soulfarm), with Noah Chase. Together, they released more than ten albums. Lanzbom is the founder of Sherwood Ridge Studio, located in Pomona, New York. He has worked with Shlomo Carlebach, Perry Farrell of Jane's Addiction, Jeff Haynes, T Lavitz, Dave Eggar, and American Idol finalist Crystal Bowersox. He served as an engineer guitarist and songwriter on Pete Seeger's album Tomorrow's Children, for which he won a Grammy Award in 2011. Lanzbom played guitar on and mixed Seeger and Bruce Springsteen's "God's Counting on Me, God's Counting on You". He co-founded the band Deadgrass in 2016.

== Discography ==
Album (year)	Track listing
Beyond this World (1996)	1. A Good Sign; 2. Here's To You; 3. Temple of Song; 4. The Master; 5. Peacemaker; 6. Boy Skin Jacket; 7. Brothers & Sisters; 8. The Best Choice; 9. Angels Around Me; 10. Saturday's Melodie; 11. I'm Your Servant; 12. Trust; 13. David's Song; 14. Crown; 15. My Sweetest Friend
From This Day On (1998)	1. The Time has Come; 2. Praise and Thanks; 3. For These I Cry; 4. Let There Be Peace; 5. Courage; 6. Separations; 7. I Raise My Eyes; 8. Moshav Song; 9. Tehillah; 10. Rebuild; 11. From Your Place; 12. Dwells Above Forever; 13. Dance
Meditations (2000)	1. Harachaman; 2. Shomer Yisroel; 3. Hinei Yamim; 4. We Can Begin; 5. A Day Off; 6. Ode Yishoma; 7. Mizmor L'david; 8. Lecha Dodi; 9. Yidalei Shrai; 10. Palma; 11. Song for Cindy; 12. Yaer
Dreams (2004)	1. Straw Hearts; 2. Asher Bora; 3. Free; 4. Shalom Aleichem; 5. Turn Around; 6. T'shuatam; 7. Yiboneh, Yiboneh; 8. Dreams; 9. Every Living Thing; 10. Shuva Hashem; 11. Sugar; 12. Song Catcher; 13. Haneshama; 14. Chak Chak
No Words (2004)	1. No Words; 2. Desert Rain; 3. Shalom Aleichem; 4. Wishes; 5. Open Up; 6. Loolai Toratcha; 7. Wind; 8. Lessons; 9. Rebecca
Strings of the Soul (2007)	1. Ben Bag Bag; 2. Eshet Chayil; 3. Yihey; 4. Im Eshkachech; 5. Yerushalayim Shel Zahav; 6. Hamalach; 7. Erev Shel Shoshanim; 8. Gam Ki Elach; 9. Chazak; 10. Nigun Neshama; 11. Esah Einai
By the Wake of the Moon (2010)	1. Oyfn Pripetshik; 2. Aura; 3. Tumbalayke; 4. Tzena, Tzena; 5. Dona, Dona; 6. Midnight Rain; 7. Yankale; 8. The Journey; 9. Daybreak; 10. Day moon
Relaxing Guitars (2014)	1. We Can Begin; 2. Tehillah; 3. A Day Off; 4. Song For Cindy; 5. Midnight Rain; 6. No Words; 7. Open Up; 8. Palma; 9. Yaer; 10. Rebecca; 11. Day Moon; 12. Moshav Song; 13. Song Catcher; 14. Wishes; 15. The Journey; 16. Daybreak; 17. Butterfly; 18. Turn Around; 19. Every Living Thing; 20. Desert Rain; 21. Aura; 22. Dreams; 23. Aleezah; 24. Wind; 25. Guitars; 26. Lessons; 27. Straw Hearts; 28. Weather Report; 29. Free; 30. Sugar
