= Jewish rock =

Form of contemporary Jewish religious music

- Stylistic origins: Contemporary Jewish religious music; rock; folk; klezmer; jam band
- Cultural origins: 1960s and 1970s in the United States and Israel
- Typical instruments: Vocals; guitar; drums; bass; keyboards

Regional scenes
- Mevo Modi'im; Yeshiva University; Knitting Factory

Other topics
- Jewish music; Israeli rock; Jews and punk rock

Jewish rock is a form of contemporary Jewish religious music that is influenced by various forms of secular rock music. Pioneered by contemporary folk artists like Rabbi Shlomo Carlebach and the Diaspora Yeshiva Band, the genre gained popularity in the 1990s and 2000s with bands like Soulfarm, Blue Fringe, and Moshav Band that appealed to teens and college students, while artists like Matisyahu enjoyed mainstream crossover success.

== History ==
=== Origins in America and Israel: 1960s to 1980s ===
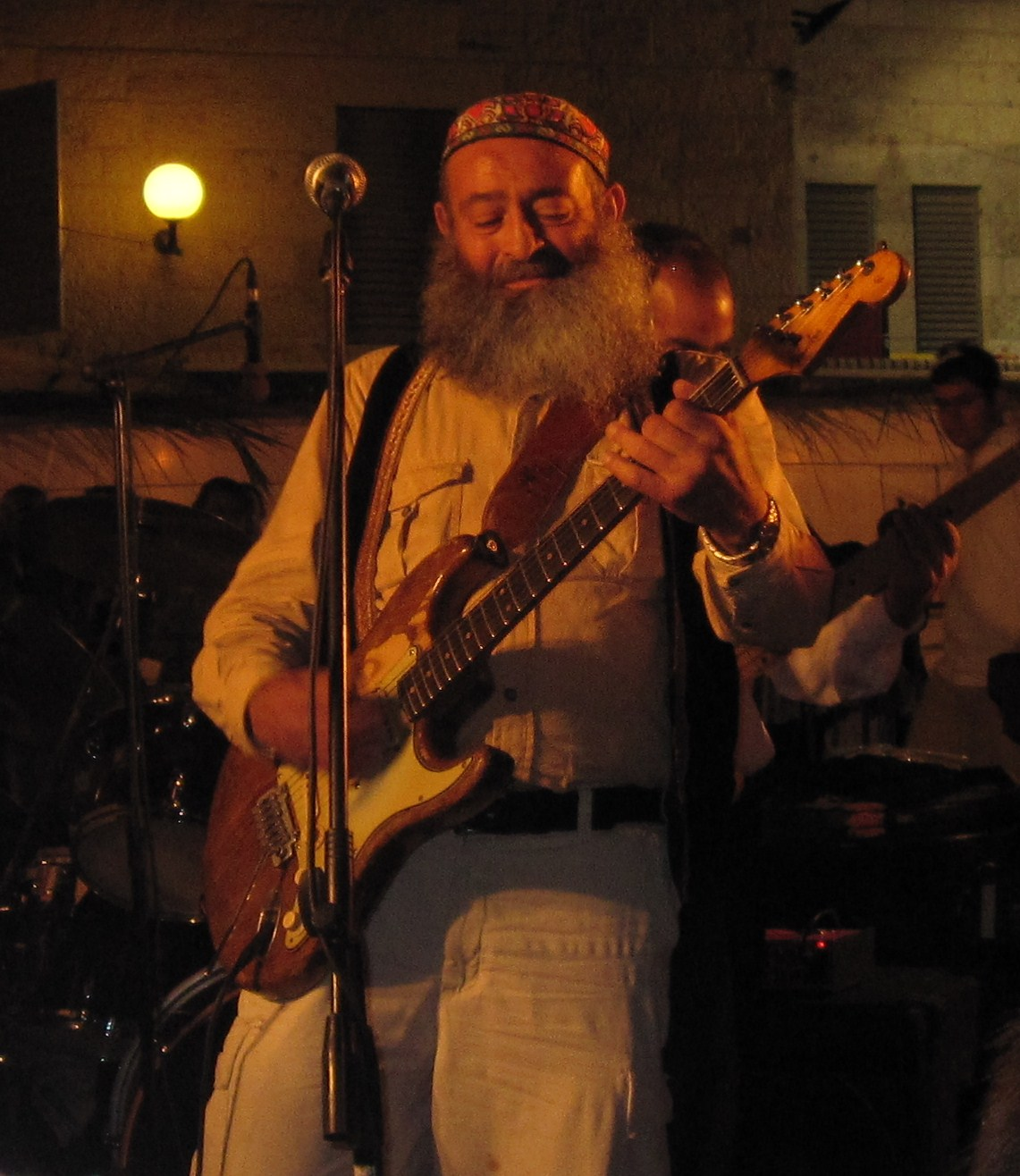
Yosi Piamenta is credited with introducing the electric guitar to Jewish music.

As early as the 1960s, established Jewish composers like Gershon Kingsley and Cantor Ray Smolover began using contemporary rock and jazz styles in their work. Simultaneously, Shlomo Carlebach, a German-born Hasidic rabbi and songwriter, began his career mixing traditional Jewish songs with the folk music and hippie subculture of the day for kiruv purposes, which would directly influence many Jewish artists over the course of his career.

One of the first full-fledged rock acts in Orthodox music was the Diaspora Yeshiva Band, founded in 1975 by American-born students at the Diaspora Yeshiva in Jerusalem, which had been founded by a colleague of Carlebach's. The founding lineup featured Avraham Rosenblum on guitar, Ben Zion Solomon on fiddle and banjo, Simcha Abramson on saxophone and clarinet, Ruby Harris on violin, mandolin, guitar, and harmonica, Adam Wexler on bass, and Gedalia Goldstein on drums. They played rock and bluegrass music with Jewish-themed lyrics, with the group self-describing its style as "Hasidic rock" and "Country and Eastern".

The Israeli group Tofa'ah emerged in 1981 as the first all-female Orthodox Jewish rock band, playing a mix of blues, jazz, and rock and roll. Around the same time, singer-songwriter Yosi Piamenta, a baal teshuva who had previously played with jazz legend Stan Getz, broke into Jewish music, where he pioneered the use of electric guitar. In the United States, Shlock Rock, formed in New York City in 1985, performed Jewish parody versions of many popular American songs, including rock music.

=== 1990s ===
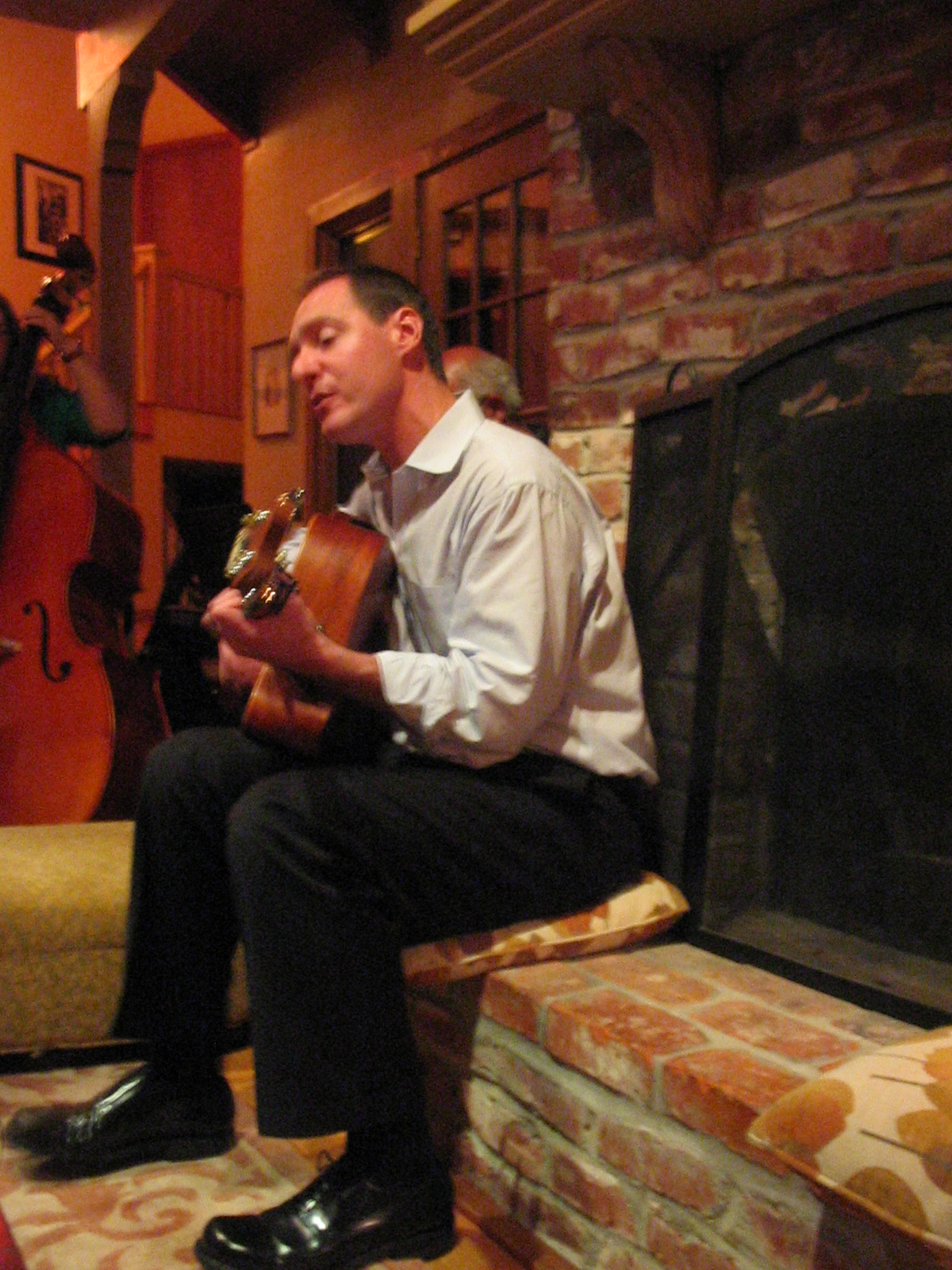
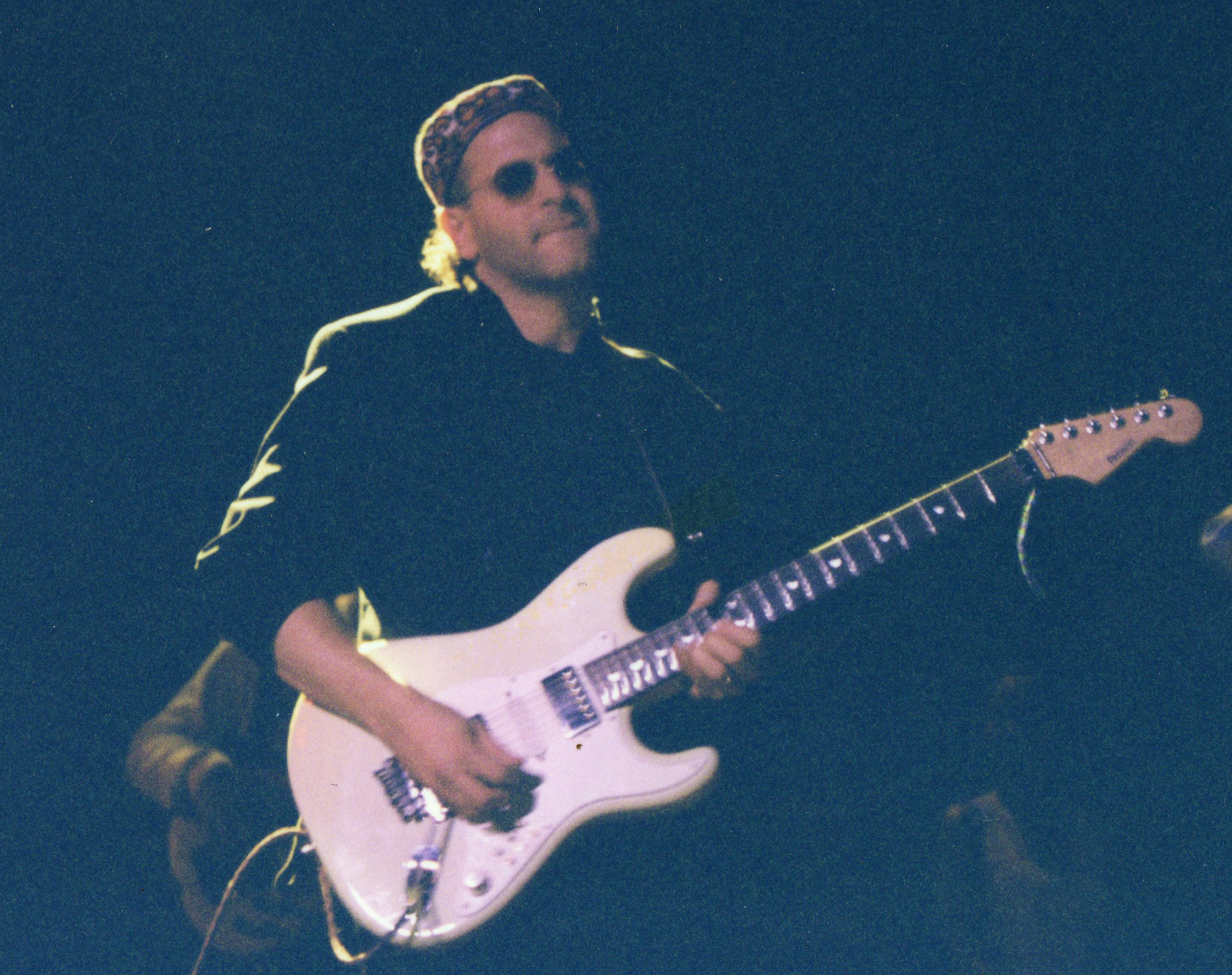
Jewish rock singer-songwriters like Dan Nichols, and RebbeSoul gained popularity in the 1990s.

A new wave of influential Jewish rock bands emerged from Israel in the 1990s, many of them directly influenced by Carlebach. A forerunner of these was Reva L'Sheva, which was formed in 1994 by lead singer Yehuda Katz and bassist Adam Wexler, formerly of Diaspora Yeshiva Band, and which combined Carlebach's music and philosophy with the jam band stylings of The Grateful Dead. In a similar vein were the groups Moshav and Soulfarm, both formed by sons of DYB's Ben Zion Solomon who had grown up with Carlebach in the village of Mevo Modi'im.

Meanwhile, in New York, avant-garde jazz composer John Zorn, a longtime fixture of the local downtown music scene, began exploring his Jewish heritage through music, incorporating klezmer and the Phrygian dominant scale into his established style. This resulted in several projects, including the Masada albums/songbooks and Zorn's own Tzadik Records, which promoted several experimental Jewish artists through its Radical Jewish Culture series.

The decade also saw the premiere of several rock-influenced Jewish singer-songwriters, including Craig Taubman, Sam Glaser, Dan Nichols, Rick Recht, and RebbeSoul.

=== 2000s ===
A significant Jewish rock band of the early 2000s was Blue Fringe. Formed in 2001 by Yeshiva University student Dov Rosenblatt, the band introduced to Jewish music a pop rock sound influenced by Coldplay, Radiohead, and The Beatles. Their debut album, My Awakening, sold upwards of 14,000 copies, a rare feat in the Jewish market, and the Jewish Journal credited them, along with Soulfarm and Moshav Band, with "advancing Jewish rock". Meanwhile, mainstream crossover success was achieved by Hasidic reggae fusion artist Matisyahu, whose debut single, "King Without a Crown", entered the Hot 100, while his album, Youth, released in 2006 by JDub Records, reached number 4 on the Billboard 200, was certified gold by the RIAA, and was nominated for a Grammy Award for Best Reggae Album.

The new millennium also saw Jewish rock bands emerge outside of New York and Israel, such as the Australian Yidcore, the British Oi Va Voi, the Canadian Black Ox Orkestar, and the Turkish Sefarad. Harder-edged alternative sounds began to appear, with grunge bands like Hamakor and Heedoosh and Jewish punk acts like Yidcore, Golem, Moshiach Oi!, The Shondes, Schmekel, The Groggers, Steve Lieberman, and Rav Shmuel.

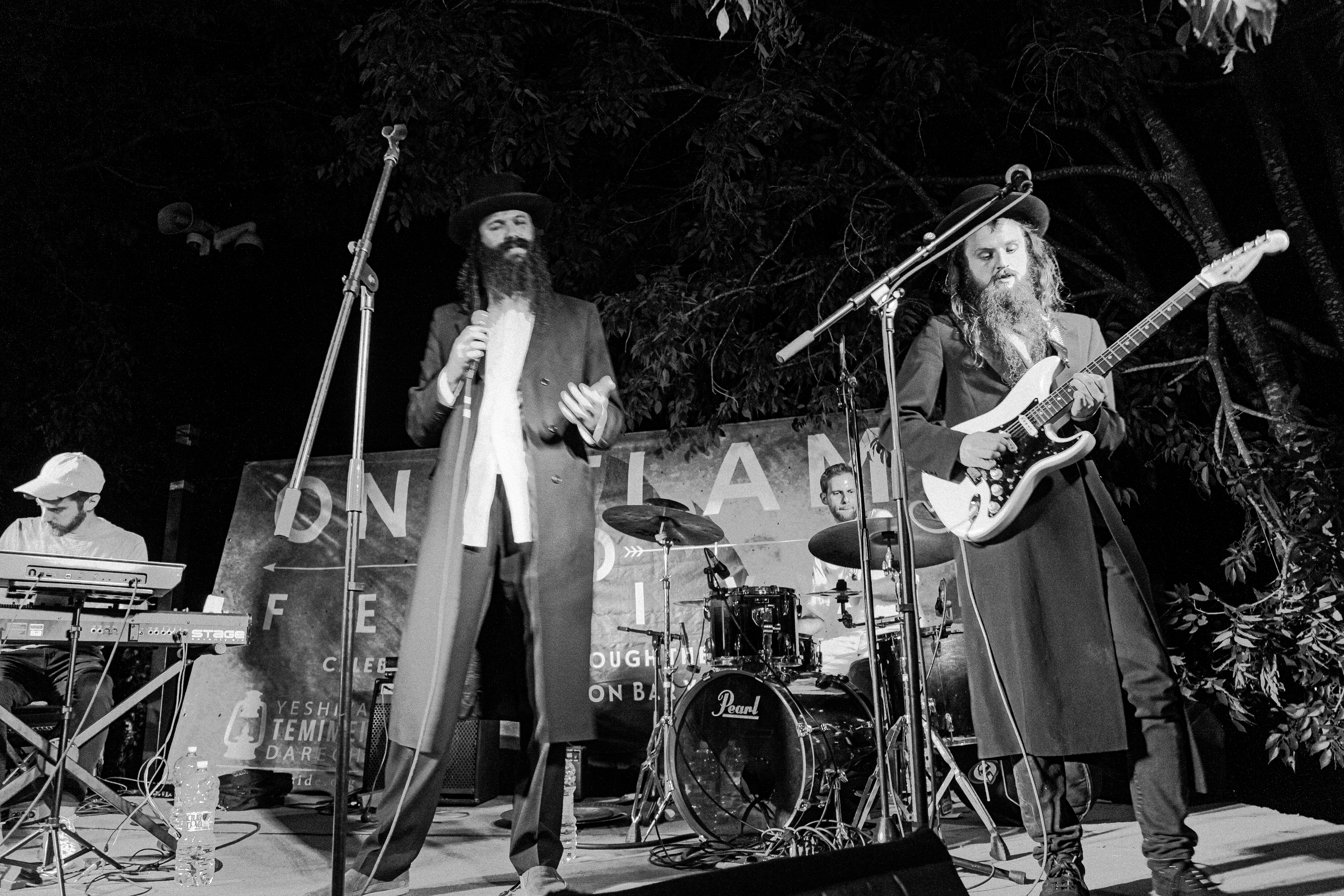
Zusha, a successful Jewish rock band of the 2010s.

=== 2010s ===
In 2010, Rick Recht founded the online radio station Jewish Rock Radio, with the intent of promoting other Jewish rock artists.

A number of Hasidic rock bands became known in the new decade, including the Moshe Hecht Band, 8th Day, Bulletproof Stockings, and Zusha, with the latter group's self-titled EP reaching No. 9 on Billboard's World Albums chart. Elsewhere, Blue Fringe's Dov Rosenblatt and Moshav Band's Duvid Swirsky co-formed the Los Angeles indie pop band Distant Cousins, whose music has appeared in several films, commercials, and television shows.

== See also ==
- Jewish hip hop
- Jews and punk rock
