= Mevo Modi'im =

Moshav in central Israel

Mevo Modi'im: מְבוֹא מוֹדִיעִים (Hebrew)
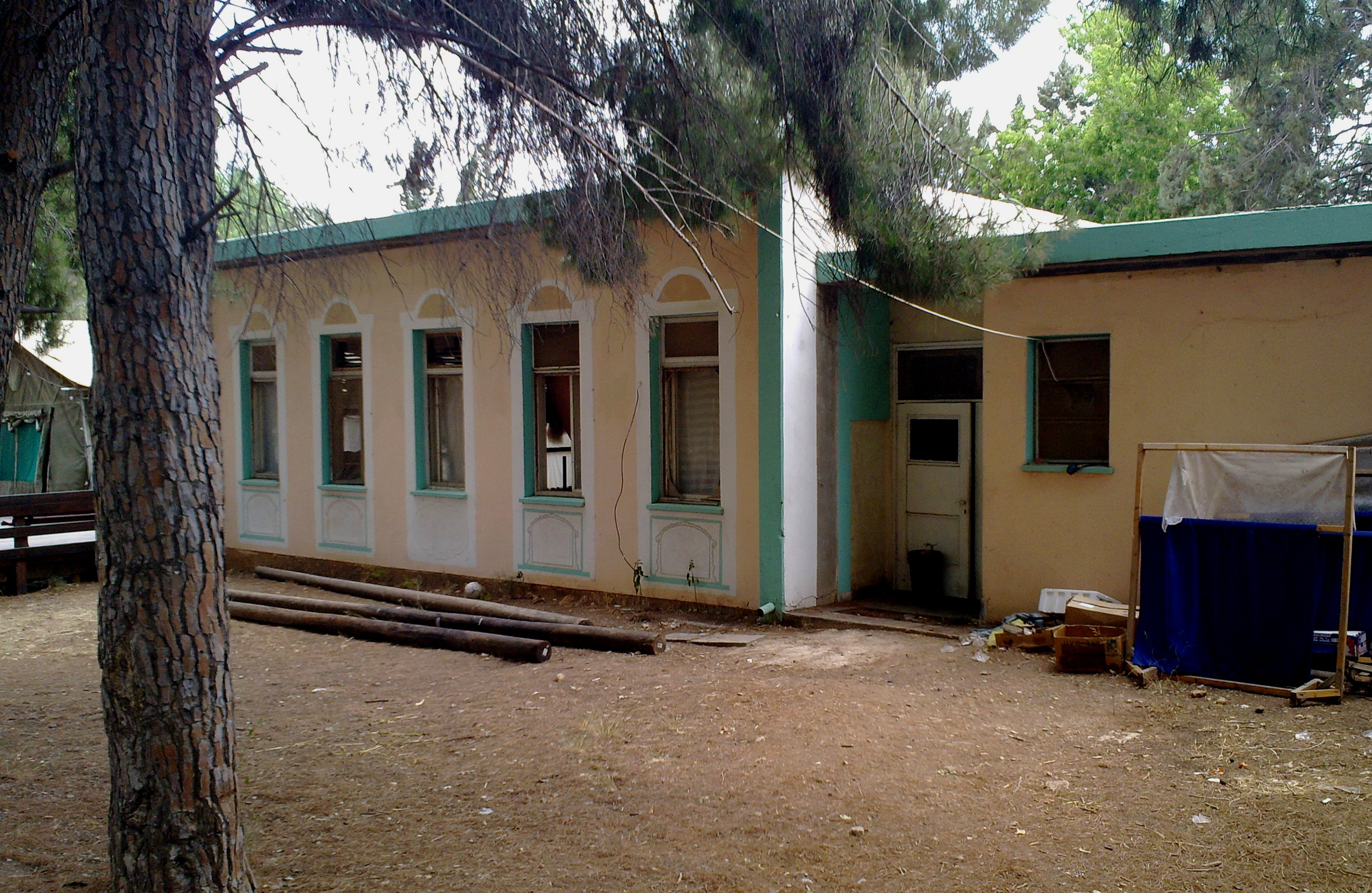

- Location within Central Israel Location within Israel
- Coordinates: 31°56′2″N 34°59′16″E
- Country: Israel
- District: Central
- Subdistrict: Ramla
- Council: Hevel Modi'in
- Affiliation: Poalei Agudat Yisrael
- Founded: 1964
- Founder: Shlomo Carlebach
- Population (2024): 187

Mevo Modi'im (Hebrew: מְבוֹא מוֹדִיעִים, lit. Modi'im Gateway), officially Me'or Modi'im (Hebrew: מְאוֹר מוֹדִיעִים), is a moshav in central Israel. It is also known as the Carlebach Moshav. Located north-west of Modi'in on Highway 443, it falls under the jurisdiction of Hevel Modi'in Regional Council. In 2024 it had a population of 187. In 2019, a fire destroyed most of Mevo Modi'im and it is currently in the process of reconstruction and expansion.

== Establishment ==
The village was founded as a moshav shitufi (village cooperative) in 1975 by Rabbi Shlomo Carlebach, who lived there in the later years of his life.

== Description ==
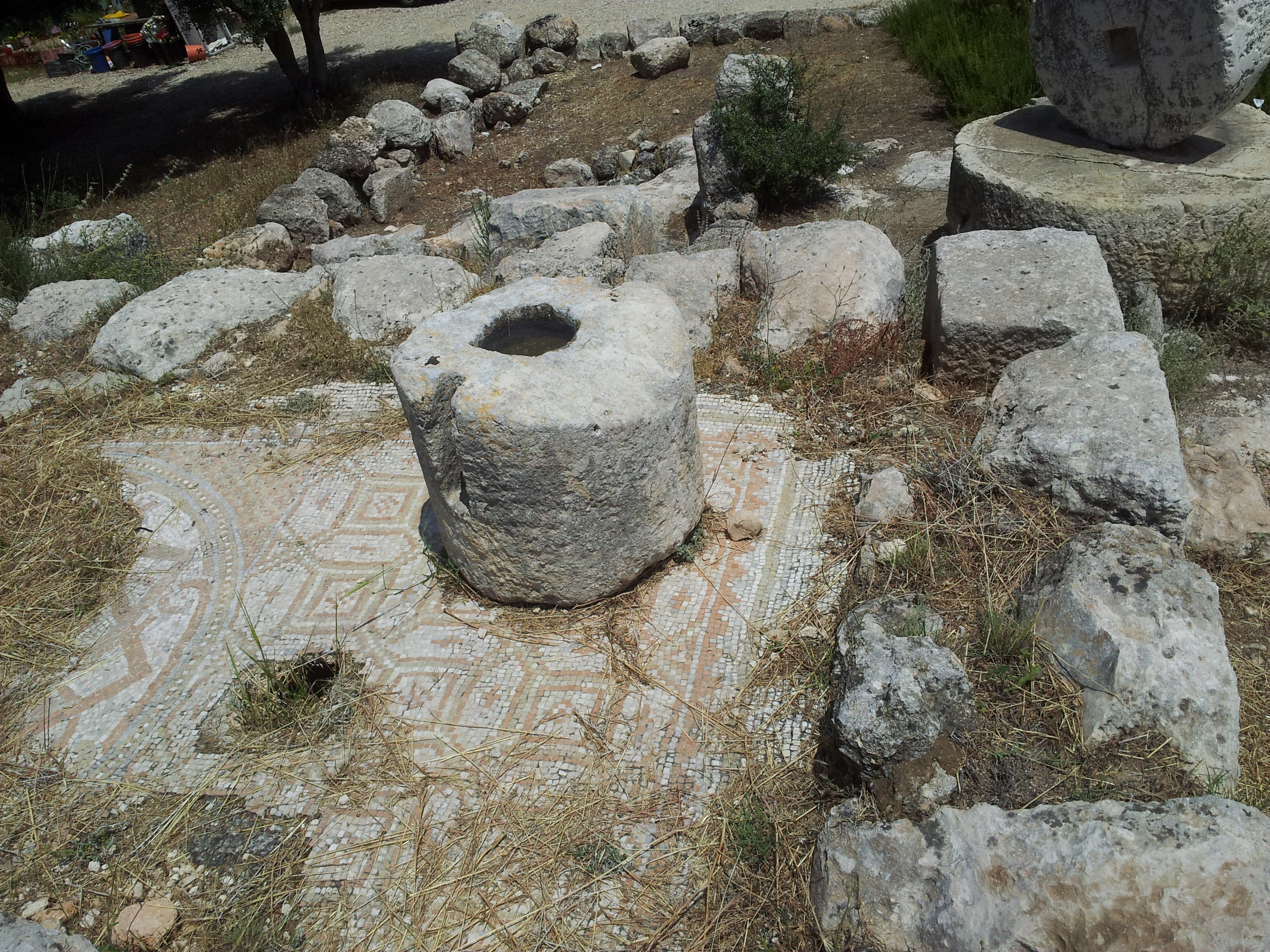
Mosaic floor and remains of an olive press

At its center, the village has a hand-painted and ornately decorated main synagogue, painted by Yitzchak Ben Yehudah.

On an uninhabited hill at the moshav center there are remains of an ancient settlement. The remains of a monastery from the Byzantine period were found as well as a mosaic floor that has been preserved almost in its entirety. Next to the remains moshav residents built a new pavilion in memory of Esh Kodesh Gilmore who was killed in a terrorist attack on 30 October 2000.

== Fire and rebuilding ==
On May 23, 2019 a large fire destroyed most of Mevo Modi'im - forty out of fifty homes. A Fire Services investigation concluded it was started in multiple locations, raising suspicion of arson. A year after the fire most of the residents were still homeless. In 2020 the residents made a land settlement with authorities. Public contracts for the construction of 112 residential units were engaged in 2021.

== See also ==
- Carlebach minyan
- Moshav Band
- Kalonymus Kalman Shapira of Piasetzno
