= Soulfarm =

American Jewish rock band

- Also known as: Inasense
- Origin: Pomona, New York, US
- Genres: Jewish rock, folk rock, jam band, world music
- Years active: 1991–present
- Label: Desert Rock
- Members: C Lanzbom; Noah Solomon; Ben Antelis; Mitch Friedman
- Past members: Mark Ambrosino; Jay Weissman; Gilad Dobrecky; Jeff Langsten; Jerome Goldschmidt; T Lavitz; Fred Walcott; Yoshie Fruchter; Andrew Frawley
- Website: soulfarm.net

Soulfarm (formerly known as Inasense) is an American Jewish rock band based in New York City. They were founded in 1991 by C Lanzbom and Noah Solomon. Their music is a mix of mainstream rock, Jewish/Middle Eastern, bluegrass, and Celtic influences (among others). Soulfarm is a fixture on the New York City club circuit. The band has also traveled extensively throughout the world.

== Band members ==
Current

- C Lanzbom – lead guitar, vocals
- Noah Solomon – lead vocals, guitar, mandolin
- Mitch Friedman – bass, vocals
- Ben Antelis – drums, vocals

Former

- Mark Ambrosino – drums
- Jay Weissman – bass
- Gilad Dobrecky – percussion
- T Lavitz – Hammond organ
- Fred Walcott – percussion
- Jerome Goldschmidt – percussion
- Jeff Langsten – bass
- Yoshie Fruchter – bass
- Andrew Frawley – drums, percussion

== Discography ==
- Inasense (1996) (as Inasense)
- The Ride (1997) (as Inasense)
- Get Your Shinebox (2000) (as Inasense)
- Scream of the Crop (2001)
- Unwind (2003)
- Monkey Dance (2008)
- Holy Ground (2010)
- Blue and White (2012)
- The Bridge (2014)
- Lost and Found (2015)
