= 8th Day (Jewish band) =

American Hasidic pop rock band

- Also known as: Eig8th Day, The Marcus Brothers
- Origin: Los Alamitos, California, USA
- Genres: Jewish rock Pop rock Folk rock
- Years active: 2004–present
- Labels: 14th Terrace, Aderet
- Members: Shmuel Marcus; Bentzion Marcus; Jason "Rosy" Rosenquist; Philip Bynoe; Leo Chelyapov
- Website: my8thday.com

8th Day is an American Hasidic pop rock band based in Los Alamitos, California. Formed in 2004 by brothers Shmuel and Bentzion Marcus, the group gained popularity in the Jewish music scene with their album Chasing Prophecy (2011) and its lead single, "Ya'alili", whose video became a minor viral hit on YouTube. As of 2021, the group has released nine studio albums and one live album. They have performed at venues throughout the country and abroad including Lincoln Center for the Performing Arts, American Airlines Arena, and Universal CityWalk.

== Name ==
The band chose its name with an eye to being "abstract" and "cool". The name evokes the holiday of Shemini Atzeret (the "8th day of assembly") and the idea of the number 8 evoking "transcendence". Shemini Atzeret is also singer Shmuel Marcus' birthday.

== History ==
Brothers Shmuel and Bentzion Marcus, both nephews of singer Avraham Fried and cousins of singers Benny Friedman and Simche Friedman, grew up in a musically-inclined family and began collaborating in 2004, with Bentzi, a professional bassist, putting music to lyrics Shmuel had written. That same year, the pair recorded a four-song demo with their brother Chaim Marcus producing. Their debut studio album, Tracht Gut (Yiddish for "think positive") was released on April 1, 2005 and featured Zalman, Chaim, Yossi, and Eli Marcus on backing vocals. Their second album, Brooklyn, was mixed by Andy Haller and released in 2007, followed by a live album in 2008. Eli Marcus later went on to become a solo artist, with a debut studio album, Dovid HaMelech, released in 2015.

In 2011, the group released Chasing Prophecy. The first single for the album, "Ya'alili", became a hit on the strength of its music video, which received over 6 million views on YouTube, and gained the group many followers.

They re-teamed with Haller in 2012 for their fourth album, All You Got.

== Musical style ==
8th Day's sound, though primarily inspired by traditional Jewish music, also contains influences from secular styles such as power pop, blues, and reggae. Guitarist Bentzion Marcus has described the group as a "very eclectic, klezmer-funk-rock band", noting that on Chasing Prophecy, "each song stands on its own. The style of songs range from Middle Eastern, rock, folk/country, jazz/blues." They sing in English, Hebrew and Yiddish.

== Members ==
- Shmuel Marcus — lead vocals, lyrics
- Bentzion Marcus — guitar, backing vocals
- Jason "Rosy" Rosenquist — drums
- Philip Bynoe — bass
- Leo Chelyapov — keys, horns

== Discography ==
Studio albums

- Tracht Gut (April 1, 2005; 14th Terrace)
- Brooklyn (August 8, 2007; 14th Terrace)
- Chasing Prophecy (February 3, 2011; 14th Terrace)
- All You Got (June 7, 2012; Aderet)
- Hooleh! (January 2, 2014; Aderet)
- Inner Flame (June 10, 2015; Aderet)
- Slow Down (March 6, 2017; Bruce Witkin)
- Stronger Closer (2018)
- Lucky (2021)

Live albums

- 8th Day Live (July 3, 2008; 14th Terrace)

Singles and music videos

- "Ya'alili" (March 23, 2011; Chasing Prophecy)
- "Shabbos Now" (April 5, 2011; Chasing Prophecy)
- "Cheery Bim" (ft. Kids of Courage) (November 19, 2012; All You Got)
- "All You Got" (December 19, 2012; All You Got)
- "Hooleh!" (March 9, 2014; Hooleh!)
- "Gam Zu" (January 1, 2015; Shmorg Tunes - a compilation of songs by Oorah)
- "Celebrate" (May 6, 2015; Inner Flame)
- "Why Wait" ("Celebrate" Hebrew Version) (2016; non-album single)
- "Hakhel" (2016; non-album single - collaboration with Chabad.org)
- "Torah" (March 14, 2017; "Slow Down")
- "Kapayim" (April 1, 2017; "Slow Down")
- "Moses In Me" (June 11, 2017; "Slow Down")
- "Miracle of Light" (December 9, 2017)
- ”We All Belong” (May 22, 2019)
- "Rollin" ( January 23, 2021)
- "Wake Up Yidden" (March 13, 2021)
- "4:59" (October 22, 2023)
- "We Want" (January 24, 2024)
