= Contemporary Jewish religious music =

Religious music post-1967

For the purposes of this article, “contemporary” refers to the period from 1967 (Israel's Six-Day War) to the present day, “Jewish” refers to the various streams and traits of Judaism practiced. Many Orthodox Jews use the term “religious” to refer to a strict adherence to Jewish law. For the purposes of this article, “religious” refers to the content and context of the music itself: liturgical or implicit references to the divine.

Jewish ethnomusicologist Mark Kligman notes, “The scope of contemporary Jewish music encompasses a wide range of genres and styles, including music for the synagogue, folk and popular music on religious themes, Yiddish songs, klezmer music, Israeli music, and art music by serious composers. Every sector of the Jewish community – from the most right-wing Orthodox to the most secular – participates in the Jewish music endeavor, creating, performing, and listening to the particular music that meets its taste and needs.”

The question of what is Jewish music and what makes music Jewish continues to be explored in academic and artistic circles alike. It may be seen in the work of Velvel Pasternak, who spent much of the late twentieth century as a preservationist committing what had been a strongly oral tradition to paper. Also, John Zorn's record label, Tzadik, features a "Radical Jewish Culture" series that focuses on exploring what contemporary Jewish music is and what it offers to contemporary Jewish culture.

== History and influence ==
=== Hasidic influence ===
Within the traditional Jewish community, cantoral and chasidic melodies were the musical standard.

In the 1950s and early 1960s recordings began to be made of non-cantorial Jewish music, beginning with Ben Zion Shenker's recording of the music of the Modzitz chassidic sect and Cantor David Werdyger's Gerrer recordings. The annual Israeli Hasidic Song Festival, first held in 1969, became a stage which saw the premières of pieces like Nurit Hirsh's Oseh Shalom; Tzvika Pik's Sh’ma Yisrael; and Shlomo Carlebach's Od Yishama and V’ha’eir Eineinu.

=== Israeli influence ===
With the founding of the State of Israel in 1948, American Jews showed increasing interest in Israeli music. This trend dramatically accelerated with the Six-Day War. “The practice of singing Israeli songs in American synagogues, camps, and at social gatherings, which spread in the 1950s, accelerated in the 1960s and 1970s as young American Jews looked to Israel as a positive model for Jewish identity, and the songs’ popularity also served as a Jewishly unifying factor.”

An additional influence was in the pronunciation of Hebrew both in worship and song. The Reform Movement, which previously had used Ashkenazic pronunciation of Hebrew (reflecting a German-Polish tradition), switched to Sephardic pronunciation (reflecting the way Israelis spoke).

=== Folk music influence ===
Largely influenced by the folk music revival of the time, in the 1960s and 1970s, a new genre of worship music grew out of the Reform summer camp movement. From almost the beginning of Reform worship, the music centered around the use of organ and choir. Rather than the paradigm of organ and choir, the new music was composed for acoustic guitar and group singing.” This new style focused on making the music "simpler, thoroughly democratic in its singability, largely Hebrew, and playable on guitar."

This influence is also clear in the music of Rabbi Shlomo Carlebach. Carlebach gained fame for bridging between the folk world and the traditional Jewish Hasidic tunes.

=== Rock influence ===
At the same time as the folk revival made waves in Jewish worship, established composers like Gershon Kingsley and Ray Smolover utilized contemporary genres like jazz and rock in their compositions. As in the broader world, the influence of rock music was debated and still is in some circles. Influence of the rock world came to the Orthodox world with bands like the Diaspora Yeshiva Band, founded in 1975 by American-born student-musicians at the Diaspora Yeshiva in Jerusalem. The founding members were Avraham Rosenblum on guitar, Ben Zion Solomon on fiddle and banjo, Simcha Abramson on saxophone and clarinet, Ruby Harris on violin, mandolin, guitar, and harmonica, Adam Wexler on bass, and Gedalia Goldstein on drums; other student-musicians also played with the group between 1973 and 1986. The Diaspora Yeshiva Band infused rock and bluegrass with Jewish lyrics, creating a style of music it called "Hasidic rock" or "Country and Eastern". The band was very popular on college campuses in the early to mid-1980s, and was famous in Jerusalem for its Saturday-night concerts at David's Tomb. It inspired later bands such as Blue Fringe, Even Sh'siyah, Reva l'sheva, Soulfarm, the Moshav Band, and Shlock Rock.

Periodically Jewish music jumps into mainstream consciousness, with the reggae artist Matisyahu being the most recent example. The 2007 Grammy Awards were a landmark in Jewish music, as the Klezmatics (a klezmer/folk group) became the first Jewish band to win a Grammy. Their music combines lyrics by Woody Guthrie, the famous American lyricist, with classical klezmer tunes.

=== Important figures ===
- Shlomo Carlebach is considered by many to be the most influential Jewish songwriter of the last half century.
- Michael Isaacson grew up in Reform Jewish summer camps and was a major innovator in Jewish camp music. He has since established himself as a prominent composer of synagogue music.
- Tofa'ah, founded in 1981, was the first all-women Jewish rock/jazz band. It sets traditional religious Jewish texts to its own compositions, as well as composes original Jewish inspirational songs. The band is unique in that it adheres strictly to the Jewish laws of kol isha and performs only for female audiences. Its work is featured in the archives of Hebrew University and the Rubin Academy of Music and Dance.
- Debbie Friedman, a product of Reform Jewish summer camps, set religious Jewish texts to melodies in the American folk genre, rendering them easily accessible and popular across denominations. Her setting of the prayers for the Havdalah ceremony is ubiquitous in virtually every Jewish community. Friedman's setting of the "Mi Shebeirach" prayer is probably her next best known composition. Julie Silver and Rabbi Shefa Gold have both followed in Debbie Friedman's footsteps as prolific female composers of contemporary Jewish religious music in their own right.
- Kol B'Seder, consisting of Cantor Jeff Klepper and Rabbi Daniel Freelander, also arose out of the Reform Jewish camp movement as one of the pioneering groups devoted to composing and fostering what is sometimes called “American Nusach: "the late 20th century refashioning of liberal Jewish worship to reflect the attitudes and beliefs of life in North America". Some of their well-known settings include "Modeh Ani", "Or Zarua", and "Shalom Rav".
- Safam, a six-man band founded in Boston in 1973, prides itself on a "Jewish-American Sound:" a wide breadth of American musical styles while maintaining a decidedly Jewish flavor. One of the group's founders, Robert Solomon, is a prominent cantor and composer in his own right.
- Sam Glaser entered the Jewish music field in 1991 with albums embraced by the full spectrum of the Jewish world. As one of the first full-time traveling Jewish performers, he paved the way for other artists on a circuit of North American Jewish institutions. He produces and arranges his own recordings and those of other artists.

== Modern trends ==
=== Trends in the Orthodox community ===
In recent years, the time lag in style between the broad music world and its adoption by the Jewish music world had been decreasing. Many groups and singers have released albums with noticeable influences from contemporary pop, rock music, etc. This is partly a result of a new wave of young Jewish musicians arriving out of yeshivas and universities. Examples of this trend include The Chevra with clear pop-boy band overtones and dance moves and Blue Fringe with its extended jam sessions echoing Phish and the Dave Matthews Band. Other examples include acts such as Chaim Dovid or Shlomo Katz who echo Shlomo Carlebach's musical style.

One type of music that is very popular among Orthodox artists and their listeners usually consists of a formulaic mix including brass, horns and strings. These songs are often a joint effort by a composer and an arranger with the singer having little to no input. Many of the entertainers are former yeshiva students who perform in dress suits. Many have day jobs or are studying in kollel and sideline singing at Jewish weddings. Musical background and training varies from no formal training to very high levels (though rarely academic).

Lyrics are most commonly short passages in Hebrew from the Torah or the siddur, with the occasional passage from the Talmud. Sometimes songs with original lyrics compiled in English, Hebrew or Yiddish deal with central themes such as Jerusalem, the Holocaust, Shabbos The Sabbath, Jewish Holidays, Jewish identity, Jewish diaspora, and the coming of Moshiach The Messiah.

Jewish boys choirs became popular in the 1970s. Among the more notable of these groups are the London School of Jewish Song / Yigal Calek, the New York School of Jewish Song / Ephraim Klein and Hershel Lebovits, JEP / Rabbi Mutty Katz & Yosef C. Golding, the Toronto Boys Choir, and the Miami Boys Choir / both Yerachmiel Begun, the Amudai Shaish Boys Choir / Shmuel Borger, Tzlil V'zemer Boys Choir / Avrohom Rosenberg, the Camp Shalva Choir of Bobov / Moshe Goldman and the Yeshiva Boys Choir / Eli Gerstner. Currently the Miami Boys Choir led by Yerachmiel Begun is perhaps the most popular, with a number of albums amongst the top record sales in Orthodox Jewish circles. Many adult groups jumped on the bandwagon in the late 60's & on, including The Mark 3, The Rabbis' Sons, The Messengers, The Noam Singers, Rashi and the Rishonim, Alumim, Ydid Nefesh, Kol Salonika, D'veykus, Shema Koleinu, Or Chodosh, The Tanchumim, The Kochavim, The Diaspora Yeshivah Band, The Kiss Brothers, Neginah, Ruach Revival, Ruach, Judáea, Safam, Neshoma, Shlock Rock, The Piamentas, The Chevra, Regesh, Kesher, Kabbalah, Kol Achai, The 8th Day.

Some female Orthodox musicians, including singers like Julia Blum, Kineret, and Ruthi Navon and groups such as Tofa'ah, Ashira, and Bulletproof Stockings, have found success performing for "women only" in accordance to the Jewish law against men hearing women singing.

=== Trends in the Reform and Conservative communities ===
The Reform Jewish summer camps continue to be a source of contemporary Jewish worship music, where artists like Craig Taubman, Dan Nichols, Rick Recht, Josh Nelson, Alan Goodis and others have shared their newest compositions with the latest generation of campers. Nichols and Recht are among the leading Jewish rock singers of the present day and remain extremely popular among Jewish summer campers. Elana Arian, Jacob "Spike" Kraus, Sam Glaser, Sue Horowitz, Noam Katz, Beth Schafer, Julie Silver, Peri Smilow and others have contributed significantly to modern Reform Jewish music and have been included in Ruach, the biennial music compilation produced by the Union for Reform Judaism.

=== Children's music ===
A large body of music produced by Orthodox Jews for children is geared toward teaching religious and ethical traditions and laws. The lyrics of these songs are generally written in English with some Hebrew or Yiddish phrases. Country Yossi, Abie Rotenberg, Uncle Moishy, Shmuel Kunda, and Lipa Schmeltzer are examples of Orthodox Jewish musicians/entertainers whose music teach children Jewish traditions. Parallel performers exist in Israel with the lyric in Hebrew or Yiddish.

In the Reform and Conservative communities, there has been a body of contemporary children's music written in the last 20 years. Children's music tends to focus on teaching Jewish values and ethics, Hebrew alef-bet and vocabulary, and teaching about the holidays. Though well-known Jewish songwriters like Debbie Friedman and Craig Taubman have written many children's songs, there are some who focus almost exclusively on this genre, like Peter and Ellen Allard and Shira Kline.

== Bibliography ==
- Brown, Ellen. "The Soundtrack of Your Life." Cleveland Jewish News. October 16, 2009.
- Daniels, Cynthia. "Teenagers Get Down With Jewish Rock." Los Angeles Times. Aug 28, 2004.
- Dreyfus, Benjamin. "Hear the echos of Miriam's song: American nusach in concert.” Studies in Jewish musical traditions: insights from the Harvard collection of Judaica sound recordings, Kay Kaufman Shelemay. Cambridge, MA : Harvard College Library, 2001: 33–50.
- Kligman, Mark. “Contemporary Jewish Music in America.” American Jewish Year Book 101 (2001): 88–141.
- Schiller, Benjie-Ellen. “The Hymnal as an Index of Musical Change in Reform Synagogues.” Sacred Sound and Social Change, Lawrence A. Hoffman and Janet R. Walton. Notre Dame, IN: University of Notre Dame Press, 1992: 187–212.
- "Shaare Emeth to host Dan Nichols." St. Louis Post Dispatch. April 5, 2006, Page A4.
- "Temple Singer Goes Secular." Charlotte Observer - July 6, 1994
