= Werdyger =

Werdyger, Werdiger, and Verdiger is a surname from the Polish word weredyk, meaning "truthful person".

People with this surname include:

- David Werdyger (1919–2014), Polish-American hazzan
- Mendy Werdyger (born 1959), American Jewish singer and owner of Aderet Music/Mostly Music in Brooklyn, New York
- Mordechai Werdyger (born 1951), American Jewish singer known as Mordechai Ben David
