= Moshe Yess =

Canadian Orthodox Jewish musician

Background information
- Born: Morris Arthur Yess; April 18, 1945; Canada
- Died: January 8, 2011 (age 65) Tucson, Arizona, U.S.
- Genres: Country, Contemporary Jewish
- Occupations: Composer, singer-songwriter
- Label: CBS Records International
- Website: mosheyess.ca

Moshe Aaron Yess (April 18, 1945 – January 8, 2011) was an Orthodox Jewish musician, composer and entertainer from Montreal, Quebec, Canada. A member of the Chabad community in Montreal, Yess was a regular performer at Chabad House events and shows, together with general music festivals and the annual A Time for Music concert.

In the 1960s, Yess shared stages with David Crosby, Jefferson Airplane, and The Association. For a time, he was part of a psychedelic music group named Research 1-6-12 which produced one album in 1968. As a solo performer, he played in Las Vegas, Reno, and other hot spots. In 1978, he moved from Hollywood, California to Jerusalem, where he enrolled in the Dvar Yerushalayim Yeshiva. There he met Rabbi Shalom Levine, who became his mentor in halacha and his musical partner in Megama. They spoke about harnessing American-style music to communicate the beauty and values of Judaism. Thus was Megama (Hebrew for "trend") born.

One of Yess's biggest hit songs was "My Zaidy," in which the speaker remembers his grandfather, who was his last link to Judaism. "My Zaidy" — "zaidy" is the Yiddish word for grandpa — touched several generations of American and Canadian Jews. Other hits by Megama included "Ain't Gonna Work on Saturday" and "Not Ashamed," and one of their successful children's shows was called "Judeo Rodeo".

Yess collaborated with Abie Rotenberg to produce the children's audio series called The Marvelous Midos Machine composed of three volumes, with all-original material. When Rotenberg produced the 4th volume in December 2011, he made the album in tribute to Yess. In the 1990s, Yess started a rock band called Burnt Offering with the blessing of The Lubavitcher Rebbe. He eventually became a follower of Lubavitch Messianism, creating a website promoting his views. Yess and the noted American composer/lyricist and scholar Maury Yeston are first cousins, whose fathers were brothers who had emigrated from London to Montreal.

== Last years and death ==
Yess retired from music in his later years when his health began to decline. Moshe Yess died of cancer on January 8, 2011, in Tucson, Arizona. He was 65 years old, leaving behind six children. His second oldest son, Tali Yess, is a Jewish singer, songwriter, and producer who has performed and recorded several of his late father's popular songs; he has also released several previously unreleased songs written by his father since the latter's passing..

In the year 2024, singer Yaakov Shwekey collaborated with the Jewish rock band 8th Day along with Moshe Yess's son, Tali, on the single 'Jewish Child.' A cover of an old Moshe Yess classic, it was received enthusiastically, and went viral among the hassidic music scene.

== Discography ==
=== Megama Duo ===
- Megama (1980)
- Megama – G-d is Alive and Well in Jerusalem (1982)
- Megama – Farewell Concert (1988)
- Megama – Greatest Hits Plus (1999)

=== Solo albums ===
- Kein Yevarech (with Kol Salonika) (1984)
- Moshe Yess (1984)
- Pintele Yid (1986)
- Shabbos on My Mind (1987)
- Art Imitates Life (1991)
- No Limitations
- Rock for the Redemption

=== With Others ===
- The Jerusalem Echoes – Coming Home (guitar & vocals) (1983)
- Journeys – Volumes 1-3 (with Abie Rotenberg) (1984,1989,1992)
- משיח (with Avi Piamenta)
- The Yess Legacy – A Tribute to the Music of Moshe Yess (2013)

=== Children's Albums ===
- The Marvelous Midos Machine – Episode 1: Up Up & Away (with Abie Rotenberg) (1986)
- The Marvelous Midos Machine – Episode 2: Shnooky to the Rescue (with Abie Rotenberg) (1987)
- The Marvelous Midos Machine – Episode 3: Does Anyone Have the Time? (with Abie Rotenberg) (1988)
- The Amazing Torah Bike – Yetziyas Metzrayim (1988)
- The Amazing Torah Bike – Brochos (1989)
- The Amazing Torah Bike 3
- The Jewish Kids Show
- Roburg (1991)
- Songs about Safety
- Silly Tales of Chelm and other Stories
- Project Majestic – A Purim Story (with Reuven Stone)
- Stories My Zaidy Told Me 1–3 (with Reuven Stone)
- Story of Noah's Ark (with Reuven Stone)
- Story of Yonah & the Big Fish (with Reuven Stone)
