= The Marvelous Midos Machine =

- Cover of Episode 1
- Genre: Children's music; science fiction
- Created by: Abie Rotenberg; Moshe Yess
- No. of episodes: 4

Original release
- Release: 1986 – 2011

The Marvelous Midos Machine is a series of Orthodox Jewish children's audiotapes by Abie Rotenberg and Moshe Yess. The series follows the science fiction adventures of rabbi-scientist Dr. Midos, who teaches Jewish values like Torah study, respect for the elderly, and the avoidance of sinas ḥinom (baseless hatred).

At the start of the first album, Dr. Midos successfully launches a satellite into space, manned by a teenage "yeshiva bochur" (boy) named Dizzy. The satellite is the last necessary component to power his Midos machine, an invention that Dr. Midos hopes will help children around the world. The Midos machine works by finding a scenario somewhere in the world where kids are acting improperly, such as not speaking the truth or acting selfishly, and sounding a loud "Midos Alert!" Dr. Midos and his helper Shnooky then intervene to teach the children about that value, usually by playing a song that the children believe is coming from somewhere nearby. After hearing the song, the kids understand their mistake and try to improve.

Until today, the albums are still being played in Orthodox Jewish preschools and homes, teaching the children how to become kinder, more caring people.

The series was also released as a video by Oorah.

== Volumes ==
- Episode 1: Up Up and Away (1986)
- Episode 2: Shnooky to the Rescue (1987)
- Episode 3: Does Anyone Have the Time? (1988)
- Episode 4: Shnooky's Bar Mitzvah (2011)
