= Religious Jewish music =

Music genre

This article describes the principal types of religious Jewish music from the days of the Temple to modern times.

== History of religious Jewish music ==
The history of religious Jewish music is that of the Jerusalem Temples, synagogal, and cantoral music composed for Jewish worship contexts since the period of the First Temple. The earliest synagogal music was based on that used during Jewish rituals performed in the Temple in Jerusalem. According to the Mishnah, the regular Temple orchestra consisted of twelve instruments and a choir of twelve male singers. A number of additional instruments were known to the ancient Hebrews but were not included in the Temple's regular orchestra: the uggav (a small flute) and the abbuv (a reed flute or oboe-like instrument).

After the destruction of the Second Temple and subsequent Jewish diasporization, music in religious contexts was initially banned. Later, these restrictions were relaxed—save for Yemenite Jews, who maintained strict adherence to Talmudic and Maimonidean Halakha, and, "instead of developing the playing of musical instruments, they perfected singing and rhythm."

It was with the development of the genre of piyyut (pl. piyyutim, 'liturgical poems') that Jewish religious music began to crystallize into definite form. In the Jewish congregational setting, the hazzan chanted piyyutim to melodies selected by their composers or composed by himself, thus introducing fixed melodies into synagogal music. The music likely retained some phrases from Temple songs, including scripture, but mainly reflected the tones familiar to Jews of various ages and places, influencing both borrowed tunes and local musical tonality.

== Classical Jewish religious music ==
From the time of the Renaissance Jewish communities in western Europe have shown some interest in modernizing the service by introducing composed music on the European model. Salamone Rossi, a composer at the court of Mantua, published a volume of psalm settings in a Baroque style similar to Monteverdi, but this did not become widely popular in synagogue use until revived in the late 19th century. In the 18th century the Venice community commissioned a number of works from non-Jewish composers such as Carlo Grossi and Benedetto Marcello.

Already in 1603, the sources tell us that harpsichords were used in the Spanish and Portuguese synagogues in Hamburg. Particularly in the Amsterdam community, but to some degree also in Hamburg and elsewhere, there was a flourishing of classical music in the synagogues in the 18th century. Important composers of the time include Abraham de Casseres, Christian Joseph Lidarti and others. There was formerly a custom in Amsterdam, inspired by a hint in the Zohar, of holding an instrumental concert on Friday afternoon prior to the coming in of the Sabbath, as a means of getting the congregants in the right mood for the Friday night service.

In the Ashkenazi world, the main impetus towards composed Jewish music came in early 19th century Vienna, where Salomon Sulzer composed settings for a large part of the synagogue service, reflecting traditional Jewish music but set in a style reminiscent of Schubert, who was a friend and contemporary. Settings in a somewhat similar style were composed by Louis Lewandowski of Berlin, Samuel Naumbourg of Paris and Japhet of Frankfurt. From this period dates the widespread use of choirs and organs, though in Orthodox synagogues the organ is not played on Shabbat or festivals, and its use is often confined to celebrations such as weddings. 20th century Anglo-Jewish composers in the same taste are Samuel Alman, Mombach and Saqui.

== Contemporary Jewish religious music ==
Religious Jewish Music in the 20th century has varied greatly. Religious Jewish Music in the 20th century has spanned the gamut from Shlomo Carlebach's nigunim to Debbie Friedman's Jewish feminist folk, to the many sounds of Daniel Ben Shalom. Velvel Pasternak has spent much of the late 20th century acting as a preservationist and committing what had been a strongly oral tradition to paper. Periodically Jewish music jumps into mainstream consciousness, with the reggae artist Matisyahu being the most recent example. In the 1970s, Jewish boys choirs became popular such as Pirchei (Volumes 1 -6), Miami Boys' Choir, Toronto Pirchei, and London School of Jewish Song. In addition, vocal groups became a fad with the Rabbis' Sons, Rashi and the Rishonim, Simchatone, and Ohr Chodosh.

Also, many Orthodox Jews often limit their children's exposure to music produced by those other than Orthodox Jews, so that they will not be influenced by what the parents see as harmful non-Orthodox ideas and fashions. A large body of music produced by Orthodox Jews for children is geared toward teaching religious and ethical traditions and laws. The lyrics of these songs are generally written in English with some Hebrew or Yiddish phrases.

== Cantillation ==
Probably the oldest surviving tradition in Jewish music is the melodies used in chanting readings from the Scriptures. These melodies are denoted by special signs printed above or below each word in the Hebrew Bible, and differ greatly between Jewish communities, though some features found in many traditions suggest a common origin. They may also differ depending on the book or passage being read, or the time of year (e.g. there are special melodies for the scriptural readings on the High Holy Days, Tisha B'Av, Purim, and the three festival holidays, Sukkot, Pesach and Shavu'ot, as well as deviations from the typical melodies for the chanting of the 10 commandments, the song of the sea and some other smaller sections of text.)

== Prayer chants ==
Many of the passages in the prayer book, such as the Amidah and the Psalms, are chanted in a recitative rather than either read in normal speech or sung to a rhythmical tune: the style of chant in a particular community is sometimes known as its nusach. The recitatives follow a system of musical modes, somewhat like the maqamat of Arabic music. For example, Ashkenazi cantorial practice distinguishes a number of steiger (scales) named after the prayers in which they are most frequently used, such as the Adonoi moloch steiger and the Ahavoh rabboh steiger. Mizrahi communities such as the Syrian Jews use the full maqam system.

The scales used may vary both with the particular prayer and with the season. For examples, there are often special modes for the High Holy Days, and in Syrian practice the scale used depends on the Torah reading for the week (see Weekly Maqam). In some cases the actual melodies are fixed, while in others the reader has freedom of improvisation.

Certain passages in the prayers, such as Nishmat, the Kaddish preceding Barechu, and the Kedushah, lend themselves to more elaborate individual rendition or choral singing. In some traditions the tunes of popular hymns are borrowed for these, while in others there are special choral compositions.

== Piyyut ==
A piyyut is a Jewish liturgical poem, usually designated to be sung, chanted, or recited during religious services. Piyyutim have been written since Mishnaic times. Most piyyutim are in Hebrew or Aramaic, and most follow some poetic scheme, such as an acrostic following the order of the Hebrew alphabet or spelling out the name of the author. Many are in the quantitative metres used for Arabic poetry.

Many piyyutim are familiar to regular attenders of synagogue services. For example, the best-known piyyut may be Adon Olam ("Master of the World"), sometimes attributed to Solomon ibn Gabirol in 11th century Spain. Its poetic form consists simply of rhyming eight-syllable couplets, and it is so beloved that it is often sung at the conclusion of many synagogue services, after the ritual nightly saying of the Shema, and during the morning ritual of putting on tefillin. Another well-beloved piyyut is Yigdal ("May God be Hallowed"), which is based upon the Thirteen Principles of Faith developed by Maimonides.

Piyyutim have traditional tunes, but these vary greatly between communities, and a single community may have up to ten different tunes for well-known piyyutim such as Adon Olam and Yigdal. Modern Jewish composers such as Philip Glass often compose choral settings of piyyutim.

== Zemirot ==
Zemirot are Jewish hymns, usually sung in the Hebrew or Aramaic languages, but sometimes also in Yiddish or Ladino. The best known zemirot are those sung around the table on Shabbat and Jewish holidays. Some of the Sabbath zemirot are specific to certain times of the day, such as those sung for the Friday evening meal, the Saturday noon meal, and Seudah Shlishit, the third Sabbath meal just before sundown on Saturday afternoon. In some editions of the Jewish prayerbook (siddur), the words to these hymns are printed after the opening prayer (kiddush) for each meal. Other zemirot are more generic and can be sung at any meal or other sacred occasion.

The words to many zemirot are taken from poems written by various rabbis and sages during the Middle Ages. Others are anonymous folk songs that have been passed down from generation to generation.

== Nigun ==
Nigun refers to religious songs and tunes that are sung by groups. It is a form of voice instrumental music, often without any lyrics or words, although sounds like “bim-bim-bam” or “Ai-ai-ai!” are often used. Sometimes, Bible verses or quotes from other classical Jewish texts are sung repetitively in the form of a nigun. Nigunim are largely improvisations, though they could be based on thematic passage and are stylized in form.

A revival of interest in Nigun was sparked as part of Hasidism. Different Hasidic groups have their own nigunim, often composed by their Rebbe or leader. One of the most famous court composers was Yankel Talmud, who led the Ger choir in the main Ger synagogues in Poland and in Jerusalem, and also composed more than 1,5000 nigunim to accompany the prayers. Hasidim gather around holidays to sing in groups. There are also nigunim for individual meditation, called devekus or devekut (connecting with God) nigunim. These are usually much slower than around-the-table nigunim, and are almost always sung without lyrics. The Baal Shem Tov, founder of Hasidism, spoke of devekus nigunim as “songs that transcend syllables and sound.” Nigun has also been used by the Musar movement, by the Jewish renewal movement, and in other Jewish movements.

== Pizmonim ==
Pizmonim are traditional Jewish songs and melodies with the intentions of praising God as well as learning certain aspects of traditional religious teachings. They are sung throughout religious rituals and festivities such as prayers, circumcisions, bar mitzvahs, weddings and other ceremonies. Pizmonim are traditionally associated with Middle Eastern Sephardic Jews, although they are related to Ashkenazi Jews' zemirot. The best known tradition is associated with Jews descended from Aleppo, though similar traditions exist among Iraqi Jews (where the songs are known as shbaִhoth, praises) and in North African countries. Jews of Greek, Turkish and Balkan origin have songs of the same kind in Ladino, associated with the festivals: these are known as coplas.

The texts of many pizmonim date back to the Middle Ages or earlier, and are often based on verses in the Bible. Many are taken from the Tanakh, while others were composed by poets such as Yehuda Halevi and Israel Najara of Gaza. Some melodies are quite old, while others may be based on popular Middle Eastern music, with the words composed specially to fit the tune.

== Baqashot ==
The Baqashot are a collection of supplications, songs, and prayers that have been sung by the Sephardic Aleppian Jewish community and other congregations for centuries each week on Shabbat morning from midnight until dawn. Usually they are recited during the weeks of winter, when the nights are much longer.

The custom of singing Baqashot originated in Spain towards the time of the expulsion, but took on increased momentum in the Kabbalistic circle in Safed in the 16th century. Baqashot probably evolved out of the tradition of saying petitionary prayers before dawn and was spread from Safed by the followers of Isaac Luria (16th century). With the spread of Safed Kabbalistic doctrine, the singing of Baqashot reached countries all round the Mediterranean and became customary in the communities of Morocco, Tunisia, Algeria, Rhodes, Greece, Yugoslavia, Egypt, Turkey and Syria. It also influenced the Kabbalistically oriented confraternities in 18th-century Italy, and even became customary for a time in Sephardic communities in western Europe, such as Amsterdam and London, though in these communities it has since been dropped. By the turn of the 20th century Baqashot had become a widespread religious practice in several communities in Jerusalem as a communal form of prayer.

== Bibliography ==
- Grove's Dictionary of Music, article on "Jewish Music"
