= Country Yossi =

American writer

Yossi Toiv
- Born: Joseph Toiv; January 9, 1949 (age 77); East New York, Brooklyn
- Other name: Country Yossi
- Occupations: Composer, singer, radio show host, author, magazine publisher
- Known for: Parody music, monthly magazine
- Spouse: Hadassah Buchinger (m. 1973)
- Children: Ora; Donna; Lisa; Arielle
- Website: countryyossi.com

Yossi (Joseph) Toiv (born January 9, 1949), known professionally as Country Yossi, is an American Orthodox Jewish composer, singer, radio show host, author, and magazine publisher. A composer and singer in the Jewish music genre, Toiv has to his credit three albums as a member of the group Or Chodosh ("New Light") circa 1971–1973, seven albums under the name Country Yossi and the Shteeble Hoppers, and a series of seven albums for children called Kivi and Tuki. He also released Country Yossi's Classic Calls, a humorous collection of actual on-air phone calls to his radio show. He has also released two animated Kivi and Tuki DVDs.

Toiv adopted his stage name from his parodies of popular country music tunes that he reworked to convey Orthodox Jewish themes. He then transferred the name as a brand name onto the magazine, radio show, musical albums, and children's books which he has published for the mostly Orthodox Jewish market in the United States. Toiv has become famous as the composer of "Little Kinderlach" which was adapted as the ubiquitous Kars4Kids jingle.

== Early life ==
Yossi Toiv was born and raised in East New York, Brooklyn. His father, Chaim Toiv, was a well-known hazzan. As a child in the 1950s, Yossi enjoyed listening to country music and writing Jewish parodies of popular songs, such as "Big Bad Moish" (a takeoff on "Big Bad John").

He attended the Lubavitcher yeshiva in Brooklyn and was one of the first students at Yeshiva Sh'or Yoshuv founded by Rabbi Shlomo Freifeld. One of his roommates was Rabbi Shmuel Brazil, with whom he formed a band called Ohr Chodosh (New Light). While Brazil demurred from performing on stage on the request of Freifeld, he did write several of the band's hits, including "Shmelkie's Niggun" and "Bilvavi". Yossi and the other band members, Yussie Lieber and Nachum Deutsch, toured in concert while Brazil joined them in the recording studio.

== Country Yossi Show ==
The band members eventually married and started working; Toiv sold diamonds on 47th Street in Manhattan. A number of years later, during a summer vacation in the Catskill Mountains, he met bandleader Heshy Walfish and told him about the country music parodies that he had written as a child. Walfish encouraged him to return to the concert circuit with a new persona, Country Yossi, and collaborated with him on new songs.

In 1986 Toiv parlayed his growing popularity into an Orthodox Jewish radio program called the Country Yossi Show in New York City. To satisfy rabbinical demand for separating the sexes, he designated one hour for children, one hour for men, and one hour for women. Later he started a weekly evening radio show in the Catskills. The Country Yossi Show offers music, chat, and halakha (Jewish law) trivia questions with prizes for correct answers. The show aired in 1986 until 2015.

== Country Yossi Magazine ==
In 1988, Toiv began publishing an English-language monthly advertising magazine called Country Yossi Magazine, distributed in New York City. Many types of topics are discussed including Torah, Humor, People, Opinion, Real Life, Sound Off, Letters to the Editor etc. and often controversial issues are broached by its writers. Various articles relating to the controversy surrounding Chabad messianism were published in the 1990s. In the acknowledgments for her book Holy Brother: Inspiring Stories and Enchanted Tales about Rabbi Shlomo Carlebach, author Yitta Halberstam Mandelbaum thanks Toiv for his willingness to print many of her controversial articles, including one about musician-rabbi Shlomo Carlebach which led to her writing that biography.

Through his magazine and radio show, Toiv has promoted the careers of many singers and entertainers catering to the Orthodox Jewish market, including Dovid Gabay, Avi Newmark, Yacov Young, Shua Kessin, Yossi Green, Eli Gerstner, and Shauli. His career has inspired many others including Yossi Green (songwriter), Lenny Solomon (Shlock Rock) and Sheya Mendlowitz (producer).

== Music and songs ==
Toiv has collaborated with Heshy Walfish on 15 humorous music albums on Orthodox Jewish themes for children. Many songs are parodies of mainstream songs that Toiv has adapted to convey Jewish messages. Toiv created the characters Kivi and Tuki for these albums.

Toiv wrote the lyrics for a 2008 NCSY CD, The Jewish Version, that parodied contemporary pop, rock, and punk hits. Toiv parodied "Hey There Delilah" as "Hey There Gedaliah", rewrote "Numb" as "Dumb", and recast "No One" as "Shalom". He composed one of the songs on Shua Kessin's 2009 album. He also wrote the lyrics to "Daddy Come Home" by the Yeshiva Boys Choir, the music video for which amassed over 11 million views on YouTube. He recently created the new theme song for Sid Rosenberg's #1 rated talk show Sid and Friends.

== Personal life ==
Toiv married Hadassah Buchinger (born 1954 in Tel Aviv) in Brooklyn in October 1973. They have four daughters.

Toiv earned a master's degree in psychology from Long Island University.
