= Megama =

Israeli country band

The Megama Duo
- Genres: Jewish, Country
- Years active: 1978-1980s
- Members: Moshe Yess; Shalom Levine

Megama (Hebrew: מגמה) was a Jewish country band consisting of Moshe Yess (d. 2011) and Shalom Levine (d. 2013). The name Megama is Hebrew for "direction".

Yess was a native of Canada who worked as a musician and arranger for several well-known American pop music artists. In the 1960s Yess shared stages with David Crosby, Jefferson Airplane & The Association. As a solo performer he played Las Vegas, Reno, and other hot spots. In 1978 he moved from Hollywood, California to Jerusalem and formed the Megama Duo with Shalom Levine. Yess recorded twelve albums and four children's music videos in all.

Yess & Levine's goal in creating Megama was to communicate the beauty and values of Judaism through American-style music. They toured for more than three and a half years. One tour, which consisted of 32 shows in 29 cities, lasted 42 days.

"My Zaidy" was Megama's biggest hit. Art Raymond of WEVD radio station in New York, claimed that it was the most requested song he had in eighteen years of broadcasting.

== Discography ==
- The Megama Record (1980)
- G-d Is Alive And Well in Jerusalem (1982)
- Farewell - Live in New York City (1988)
- The Greatest Hits of Megama Plus! (1999)
