= Rick Recht =

American rock musician (born 1970)

Richard Samuel "Rick" Recht (born August 28, 1970) is an American rock musician who was one of the early pioneers of contemporary Jewish rock music in the early 2000s, performing for Jewish teenage and young adult audiences. He is the founder and executive director of Songleader Boot Camp (SLBC).

== Career ==
Recht grew up in St. Louis, Missouri. By the late 1990s, he was a member of a band and worked as a song leader at a Jewish day camp in St. Louis.

By the early 2000s, Recht and his band were touring nationwide, delivering about 150 performances a year, included for an estimated audience of 30,000 people at the Los Angeles Jewish Festival in 2003.

In 2010, Recht founded Jewish Rock Radio, one of the first exclusively Jewish rock online radio stations in the United States.

Recht is the Artist-in-Residence at the United Hebrew Congregation in Chesterfield, Missouri, where he provides music for Shabbat, High Holidays, and other programming.

In October 2023, the nonprofit Judaism Alive (of which Recht is executive director) organized the virtual event nity in Harmony: Standing in Solidarity, Song, and Prayer for Israel. Recht appeared with fellow musicians and community leaders, including David Broza, Nefesh Mountain, JFNA board member Julie Platt, Winnie Grinspoon of the Harold Grinspoon Foundation, and Rabbi David Ingber of the 92nd Street Y.

== Discography ==
Recht has released eight studio albums, two children's albums, and four live albums.

=== Studio albums ===
| Year | Title | Label | Notes |
|---|---|---|---|
| 1992 | Collage | Independent | Sole album with the band Collage. |
| 1994 | Reality | Independent | Debut solo album. |
| 1998 | Good Thing | Vibe Room | |
| 1999 | Tov | Vibe Room | Debut Jewish-themed album. Features a backing choir of USY, NFTY, and BBYO singers. |
| 2004 | What Feels So Right | Vibe Room | |
| 2005 | Tear Down The Walls | Jewish Rock | Collection of songs themed around social justice and anti-racism. |
| 2009 | Simply Shabbat | Jewish Rock | Collection of original melodies for Shabbat songs. |
| 2013 | Halleluyah | Jewish Rock | |
| 2018 | Here I Am | Independent | |

=== Live albums ===
| Year | Title | Label | Notes |
|---|---|---|---|
| 2001 | Shabbat Alive! | Vibe Room | Released as multimedia CD. Features six youth choirs from St. Louis and Kansas City, as well as guest appearances from Craig Taubman, Dan Nichols, and Peri Smilow. |
| 2003 | The Hope (Live) | Vibe Room | Features Recht's successful song "The Hope". |
| 2005 | Shabbat Alive! Live | Jewish Rock | Recording of Recht's Shabbat Alive! service, recorded at United Hebrew Congregation in St. Louis. Includes originals as well as compositions from Craig Taubman, Debbie Friedman, Julie Silver, Dan Nichols, and others. |
| 2008 | Knockin' Holes in the Darkness | Jewish Rock | Recorded on April 19, 2007 at Hope Presbyterian Church in Memphis, Tennessee. Includes three bonus studio tracks. |

=== Children's albums ===
| Year | Title | Label | Notes |
|---|---|---|---|
| 2002 | Free to Be the Jew in Me | Jewish Rock | Collection of children's songs as well as short stories, poems, and skits, with themes of diversity and Jewish identity. |
| 2010 | Look At Me! | Jewish Rock/PJ Library | Collaborative album with musician Sheldon Low. |

=== Singles ===
| Year | Title | Album |
|---|---|---|
| 2018 | "Oseh Shalom" | Here I Am |
| 2021 | "Chosen Family" | non-album single |

=== Music videos ===
- "The Hope" (2006)
- "Summer of Our Lives" (2012)
- "The Rainbow Song" (2017)
- "Sanctuary" (2017)
- "Here For You" (2019)
- "Oseh Shalom" (2019)
- "Chosen Family" (2022)
