= Kars4Kids =

American nonprofit organization

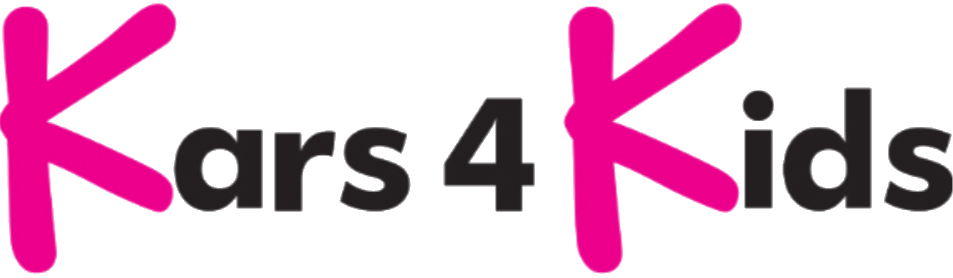
- Founded: 1994
- Type: Nonprofit organization
- Tax ID no.: 22-3746050
- Legal status: 501(c)(3)
- Purpose: Jewish youth and the families thereof
- Location(s): Lakewood, New Jersey, U.S. Toronto, Ontario, Canada; Jerusalem, Jerusalem District, Israel
- Region served: United States, Canada and Israel
- Method: Personal guidance and educational resources
- Chief Executive Officer: Eliyahu Mintz
- President: Robert Moskovits
- Chief Operating Officer: Esti Landau
- General Counsel, Director of Public Affairs: Ben Turin
- Revenue: $65,588,133 (2018)
- Expenses: $59,842,570 (2018)
- Employees: 152 (2018)
- Volunteers: 15 (2018)
- Website: U.S.: www.kars4kids.org Canada: www.kars4kids.ca Israel: www.kars4kids.co.il

Kars4Kids is an American Jewish 501(c)(3) nonprofit car donation organization based in Lakewood, New Jersey. It states that its mission is to fund "educational, developmental, and recreational programs for Jewish youth and their families". This is provided through programs largely facilitated by its sister charity Oorah, an Orthodox Jewish outreach (kiruv) organization that focuses on Jewish youth and the families thereof. It was founded in 1994 and is currently headed by Eliyahu Mintz.

== Background ==
Kars4Kids is a nonprofit organization with 501(c)(3) status, operating in the United States, Canada, and Israel. Kars4Kids was originally the name of the vehicle donation effort of the organization Joy for Our Youth; in 2014, that organization took Kars4Kids as its official name. Kars4Kids takes donations of cars, boats, yachts and real estate, which are then auctioned for salvage. The organization accepts over 40,000 cars annually. In 2018, Kars4Kids reported revenue of $65.6 million and expenses of $59.8 million. Donations to Kars4Kids benefit Oorah, a national nonprofit organization whose stated mission is "to give Jewish children and their families opportunities to become active and productive members of their communities".

== Work ==
Kars4Kids offers financial assistance to students to help pay for private school tuition and GED testing. The organization also sponsors a youth program known as Chillzone, an after-school program teaching Jewish culture and moral values. Additionally, they sponsor the summer camp TheZone, which operates Jewish sleepaway camps in the upper Catskills region of New York State. They also offer small grants to other nonprofit organizations. Advertising and overhead costs use up two-thirds of the money they take in.

The organization has hosted giveaways of coats for the needy, including in Newark, New Jersey, where they held a coat giveaway with then–Newark Mayor Cory Booker, and in Brooklyn, New York, where they worked with Congressman Ed Towns to give away winter jackets to underprivileged children, including at the Marcy Avenue Houses. Prior to the start of the 2012 school year, Kars4Kids partnered with local government officials to give away backpacks to over 3,000 children in the Queens housing projects, and to children in the Bronx.

The organization saw a significant increase in donated cars following Hurricane Sandy, with owners donating cars totaled by hurricane damage. After being contacted by the New York Police Department, the charity auctioned off a 2003 Ford Explorer in which two children drowned after being swept from their mother's arms during the hurricane. The auction proceeds went to raise money for coats for the needy. Kars 4 Kids worked with United States Representative Michael Grimm to distribute over 1,000 children's coats and other assorted clothing items to Staten Island residents affected by the hurricane. In 2014, Kars4Kids released an app for Android, Kars4Kids Safety, which aims to prevent accidental deaths of children left in hot cars, by providing reminders to their parents. The app syncs with the car's Bluetooth technology, to set off an automatic alert when the phone's Bluetooth disconnects from the car's.

== Reception ==
In 2017, CharityWatch criticized Kars4Kids for not disclosing that donations to the charity would benefit a Jewish organization. In 2024, CharityWatch included Kars4Kids in its list of "Worst Charities in America", saying that its marketing and fundraising were not transparent about its true mission. CharityWatch also criticized Kars4Kids as not spending its funds efficiently, saying that the charity's 2023 financial statements showed that it only spent 41% of its expenditures on charitable programs, and that it spent $48 per $100 raised.

== Advertising jingle ==
Kars4Kids advertising jingle

1-877-Kars 4 Kids.
K-A-R-S, Kars for Kids.
1-877-Kars 4 Kids.
Donate your car today.

In 1999, Kars4Kids ran advertisements on New York radio stations, featuring an advertising jingle that the organization would become known for. The group's director of public relations stated that the song was written in the late 1990s by a volunteer, with music adapted from Country Yossi's song "Little Kinderlach". By 2004, the ads began to play in other markets such as Chicago, and later nationally as part of radio network ad time. In 2014, Kars4Kids introduced a television commercial featuring the jingle.

The jingle has become the subject of public ridicule, as critics have considered it to be an annoyance; it was described by San Francisco Chronicle journalist Peter Hartlaub as an "assault on [the] senses". On November 4, 2010, Don Imus was caught on a hot mic mocking a Kars4Kids ad during a commercial break of his radio show Imus in the Morning, telling the group to "go to hell" and jokingly blurting "I'll give you my Bentley, you moron." Imus later apologized. Vulture jokingly declared that the television version of the ad would bring end times.

The jingle has been referenced and parodied by multiple television series; in a December 2014 Saturday Night Live sketch satirizing talk show Charlie Rose, James Elmer Mitchell and Bruce Jessen (Bobby Moynihan and Kyle Mooney) told Rose (Taran Killam) that the Kars4Kids jingle was one of the Central Intelligence Agency's other torture methods, alongside Time Warner Cable customer service and airport security screenings. In 2016, The Daily Show made a parody of the commercial entitled "Guns4Kids", later reposted by Kars4Kids in their Facebook page, to criticize a bill proposed at the Iowa House allowing children to own handguns. The 2018 Will & Grace episode "Friends and Lover" featured a parody of the charity known as "Trucks4Tykes", which was portrayed as having a similarly annoying jingle. In the season four premiere episode of The Good Place, "A Girl From Arizona", the jingle is sung by several demons as the anthem of "The Bad Place".

The HBO series Last Week Tonight with John Oliver has satirized the ad on multiple occasions, including a 2018 episode where host John Oliver described a propaganda song performed by children to promote China's Belt and Road Initiative as being a "Kommunist Kars4Kids", and a 2020 episode where Oliver described a temporary studio the show adopted due to the COVID-19 pandemic (which has a solid white backdrop) as being either "the place movie characters go when they've just died, or where they shot the Kars4Kids commercial", and that it was "the coronavirus of commercials, in that it is horrifically infectious and ruins people's lives".

== Legal issues ==
The organization has been criticized for inadequately disclosing its religious affiliation. In 2009, Joy for Our Youth Inc., the company doing business as Kars4Kids and Oorah, paid $65,000 in fines in Pennsylvania and $65,000 in fines in Oregon in settlements reached with the respective state attorneys general as a result of the organization's failure to disclose their religious affiliation. In Oregon, the attorney general added that Kars4Kids failed to disclose that its offer of a "free vacation" for vehicle donors was designed to recruit people to attend timeshare presentations.

In 2017, Minnesota Attorney General Lori Swanson conducted a compliance review and submitted a 300-page report to the Internal Revenue Service. The report found that 44% of funds raised by Kars4Kids went to program expenses, and most of that money had gone to its sister organization Oorah, whose concentration in New York and New Jersey meant only one Minnesota child was believed to have benefited from one of its programs in the years 2012–2014 (finding that only 1% of its funding went to children in the state). The report also mentioned the charity had lost money in real estate investments in the 2008 financial crisis and may have been a victim of losses from a Ponzi scheme.

In April 2024, a federal appeals court reversed a $10.6 million 2019 trademark infringement judgment against Kars4Kids in a suit brought by the older, Texas-based charity America Can! Cars for Kids. The appellate court found that the lawsuit had not been brought in a sufficiently timely manner.

A federal class-action lawsuit filed on November 4, 2025, by the law firm Keller Grover in the United States District Court for the Northern District of California accuses Kars4Kids and its related charity, Oorah, of operating a misleading vehicle-donation program that misrepresents how donor contributions are used.

In May 2026, Orange County, California Superior Court Judge Gassia Apkarian issued a permanent injunction banning Kars4Kids from using its existing advertising in the state of California until the charity gave "an express, audible disclosure" of its religious affiliation and of the location and age range of its primary recipients. The injunction also banned the use of images of prepubescent children to solicit donations for people who have reached the age of majority. The court found that Kars4Kids' advertisements were "misleading by omission" by not disclosing that their primary purpose was to fund Oorah, that they have a religious affiliation, or that the only program in California that benefited from Kars4Kids was a backpack drive "characterized as a branding exercise", even though 25% of Kars4Kids' revenue came from California. Moreover, despite using ads featuring young children, kids in need were not the focus of the program. Rather, the funds serve such programs as one supporting 17- and 18-year-olds seeking gap-year trips to Israel and their families. COO Esti Landau testified that Kars4Kids had spent $437,000 on "Middle East outreach", and $16.5 million on a building in Israel. The injunction was stayed by an appeals court in June 2026, allowing the jingle to be aired in California while the appeals process continued.

== Data breach ==
On November 3, 2018, cyber security researcher Bob Diachenko discovered a publicly accessible MongoDB database that contained the emails and personal details of 21,612 Kars4Kids donors/customers plus super administrator password/login details. The database also contained a ransomware note that the files had been stolen and would be returned for bitcoin.

== Affiliate ==
Junk for Joy, a Texas car-donation organization described as an affiliate of Kars4Kids and also headed by Eliyohu Mintz, was found not to have given any money to charities during its first six years, according to its tax records. During that time the organization had raised $4.4 million, 88% of which had been spent on advertising and legal expenses. Two-and-a-half million dollars had flowed from Kars4Kids through Oorah to Junk for Joy.
