= Eli Gerstner =

- Born: Eliezer Gerstner; March 13, 1980 (age 46)
- Genres: Contemporary Jewish religious music
- Occupations: Vocalist record producer songwriter
- Years active: 1999–present
- Label: EG Productions
- Website: www.eligerstner.com

Eliezer "Eli" Gerstner (Hebrew: אליעזר גרסטנר), is an Orthodox Jewish singer, songwriter and producer.

== Music career ==
Gerstner began composing songs as a teenager. He produces albums of contemporary Jewish religious music under the name "EG Productions". He launched and produces the Yeshiva Boys Choir, The Chevra, Yosis Orchestra, Tek-Noy, Menucha, and Dovid Stein. He produced the annual HASC A Time For Music concert from HASC 29 in 2016 until HASC 35 in 2022.

== Personal life ==
Gerstner was born in 1980. He is married with four children and lives in Brooklyn, New York.

== Discography ==
=== Eli Gerstner ===
- Hinei (1999)
- Yosis (2001)
- V'ishei Yisroel (2002)
- Hodu Lo (2020)
- Rise! (Chizuk Project) - Single (featuring Avraham Fried, Eli Gerstner, Baruch Levine)

=== The Chevra ===
- The Chevra (2001)
- Eli Gerstner & The Chevra Sing Acapella (2002)
- The Chevra 2 (2004)
- The Chevra 3 (2007)
- Chai (2013)

=== Yeshiva Boys Choir ===
- Vol. 1: Kol Hamispalel (2003)
- Vol. 2: V'ohavta L'reiacha Kamocha (2005)
- YBC Live! (2005) (featuring Eli Gerstner and Menucha)
- Vol. 3: Shabichi (2007)
- YBC Live! II (2007) (featuring The Chevra, Tek-Noy, and Dovid Stein)
- Vol. 4: Sh'moy Shel Melech (2009)
- YBC Live! III (2009) (featuring Eli Gerstner, Menucha, Dovid Stein & Yaakov Mordechai Gerstner)
- Vol. 5: Chanukah (2010)
- YBC Live! 4 (2011) (featuring Eli Gerstner, Yaakov Mordechai Gerstner & Michoel Pruzansky)
- Amein: An A Capella Production (2012)
- Vol. 6: Modeh Ani (Thank You) (2014)
- Our Greatest Hits Live! Tour (2019)

=== Ben Klein ===
- Benny K'ton (2003)
- The Jewish Version NCSY (2008)

=== Menucha ===
- Menucha (2003)
- Sh'ma Yisroel (2010)

=== Yosis Orchestra ===
- Yosis Orchestra & Singers (2004)

=== Tek-Noy ===
- Tek-Noy (2005) (The name of Tek-Noy is a Yiddish-sounding mispronunciation of "techno.")

=== Dovid Stein ===
- Melech (2008)
