= Stuart Ditchek =

Stuart Ditchek is an American author, board-certified Pediatrician, and Professor of medicine, best known as one of the authors of the book on integrative pediatrics, Healthy Child, Whole Child: Integrating the Best of Conventional and Alternative Medicine to Keep Your Kids Healthy (HarperCollins 2001). A second edition of the book was released in 2009. Dr. Ditchek has a website where he provides information on integrative pediatrics. Dr. Ditchek founded and served as the medical director of Camp Simcha Special, from 2001 to 2009, a camp for children with chronic illnesses, a program of Chai Lifeline and currently acts as the medical director of Kids of Courage, a non-for-profit for children with chronic lifelong illnesses.

Dr. Ditchek is also the founder and director of the Committee for the Release of Zachary Baumel campaign, seeking the release of the three Israeli soldiers who went missing in the Battle of Sultan Yacoub, Lebanon in 1982. Baumel is an American citizen and whose remains were returned to Israel in 2019.

== Books and publications ==
Healthy Child, Whole Child: Integrating the Best of Conventional and Alternative Medicine to Keep Your Kids Healthy (with Russell H. Greenfield, MD) (2001)
