= Lee Bycel =

American rabbi

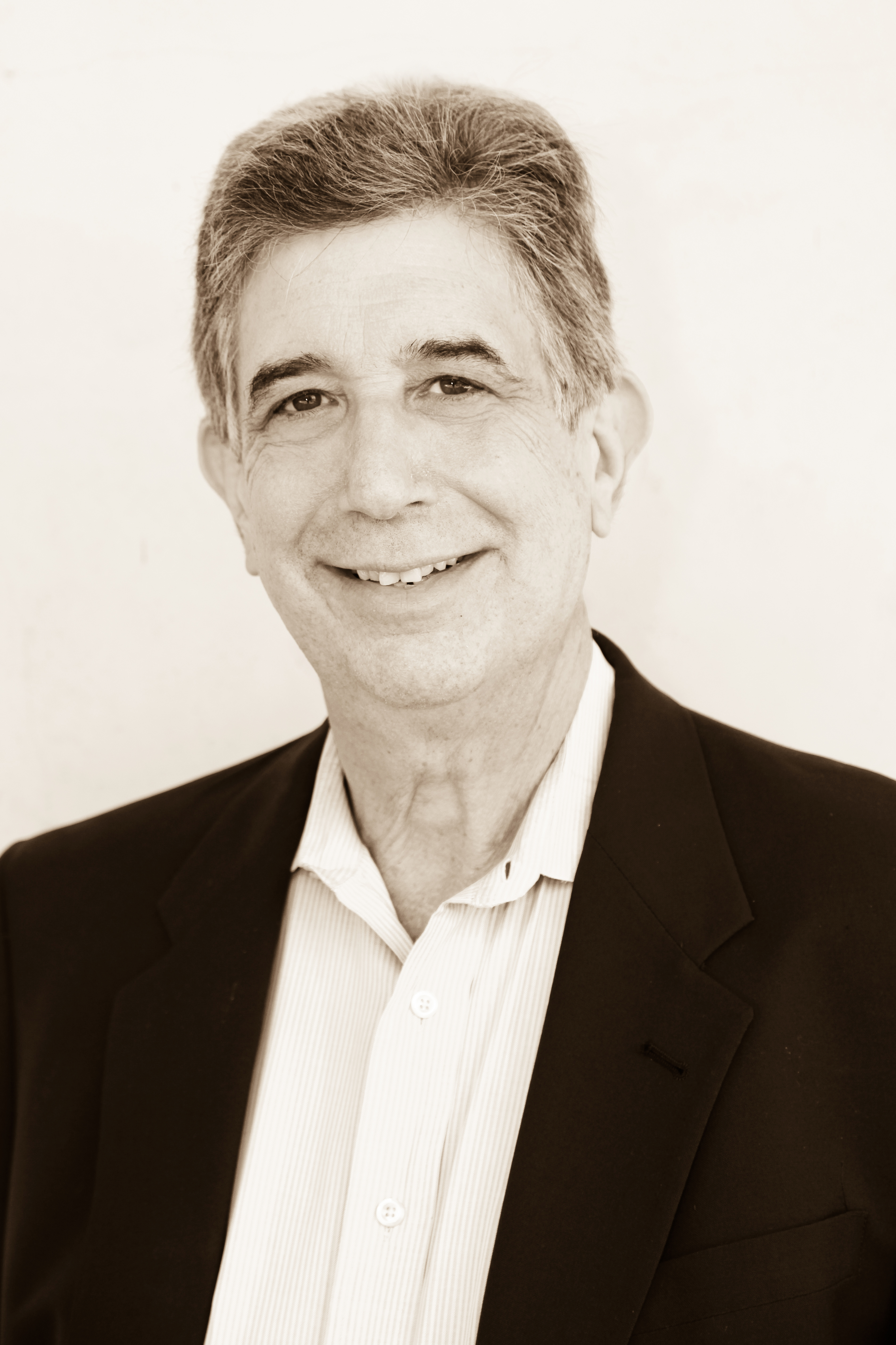
Rabbi Lee Bycel

Lee Bycel is an American Reform rabbi, rabbinic educator and social activist. He served as dean of the Hebrew Union College-Jewish Institute of Religion in Los Angeles for 15 years, as western regional executive director of American Jewish World Service, and, in 2017, retired from Congregation Beth Shalom of the Napa Valley. He is an adjunct professor of Jewish Studies & Social Justice with the Swig Program in Jewish Studies and Social Justice at the University of San Francisco.

== Early life and education ==
Bycel grew up in Huntington Park, California. Bycel spent his 1977 honeymoon with his wife Judy in the Soviet Union opposing discrimination against Soviet Jews . They now have two "adult" sons and three grandchildren.

Bycel received a B.A. in philosophy from the University of California at Berkeley, was ordained as a rabbi at the Hebrew Union College, and received a doctorate from the Claremont School of Theology.

== Humanitarian work and activism ==
Bycel has done humanitarian work in Chad and Darfur. With the International Medical Corps, he has led relief trips to Kenya, Rwanda and Sudan, and has also done relief work in Haiti and Ethiopia. Bycel traveled extensively to mobilize support for the people of Darfur.

He served as president of the Human Rights Commission of Los Angeles County.

== Honors ==
He has received the Humanitarian Award of the National Conference for Community and Justice.

On November 7, 2014, he received an honorary Doctorate of Humane Letters decree from Hebrew Union College - Jewish Institute of Religion. The degree was presented by chancellor David Ellenson of the college, at the dedication of the new synagogue building for Congregation Beth Shalom of the Napa Valley, and that congregation's 60th anniversary celebration.

== Congregational work ==
- Congregation Rodef Sholom, San Rafael, California (1979-1982)
- Anshe Chesed Fairmount Temple, Beachwood, Ohio (1998 - 2000)
- Congregation Beth Shalom of the Napa Valley, Napa, California. (2012–present)

== Executive and board service ==
Bycel has served on the board of MAZON: A Jewish Response to Hunger and as president of the Brandeis-Bardin Institute. He served as executive director of the Redford Center, founded by Robert Redford “to collaborate in cultivating creative, action-based solutions to some of today’s most compelling civic, environmental and social challenges.” Along with Redford and Teri Heyman, he was an executive producer of the documentary film Watershed: Exploring a New Water Ethic for the New West, about western water issues.

He is a senior moderator at the Aspen Institute, and operates a consulting business called CedarStreet Leadership.

On April 10, 2014, President Barack Obama announced his intention to nominate Bycel as a member of the United States Holocaust Memorial Council. He now serves on the council's Committee of Conscience.
