= Yankel Talmud =

Israeli musical artist

Yankel Talmud ינקל תלמוד
- Born: Yaakov Dov Talmud; 18 December 1885; Warsaw, Poland, Russian Empire
- Died: October 1965 (aged 79) Tel Aviv, Israel
- Genres: Jewish liturgical music
- Occupations: Prayer leader, choirmaster

Yaakov Dov (Yankel) Talmud (Hebrew: ינקל תלמוד; 18 December 1885 – October 1965) was a Hasidic composer of Jewish liturgical music and choirmaster in the main synagogue of the Gerrer Rebbes both in Ger, Poland, and in Jerusalem, Israel. Known as "the Beethoven of the Gerrer Rebbes", he composed dozens of new melodies every year for the prayer services, including marches, waltzes, and dance tunes. Though he had no musical training and could not read music, Talmud composed over 1,500 melodies.

== Early life ==
Yaakov Dov (Yankel) Talmud was born on 18 December 1885 (10 Tevet 5646) in Warsaw, Poland, to a family of Gerrer Hasidim. His father, an accomplished Talmid Chacham, worked in the lumber trade. Yankel was orphaned at a young age and was raised by Kotzk Hasidim in that city.

As a young child, Yankel often sneaked into the main Ger synagogue to listen to the choir rehearse for the High Holy Days. When he was 12, choirmaster Yisrael Eckstein spotted him and demanded to know why he was there. Yankel begged Eckstein to test his voice. He became a member of the choir the very next Shabbat.

Talmud broadened his understanding of music and prayer by visiting well-known baalei tefillah (prayer leaders) such as Reb Zeidel Rovner and Reb Nissan Belzer. As a young man, he was given the responsibility of importing the niggunim of Reb Yonah Erlich, Reb Nissan Koshinover, and others to Ger. Often he altered the tunes with his own additions and revisions.

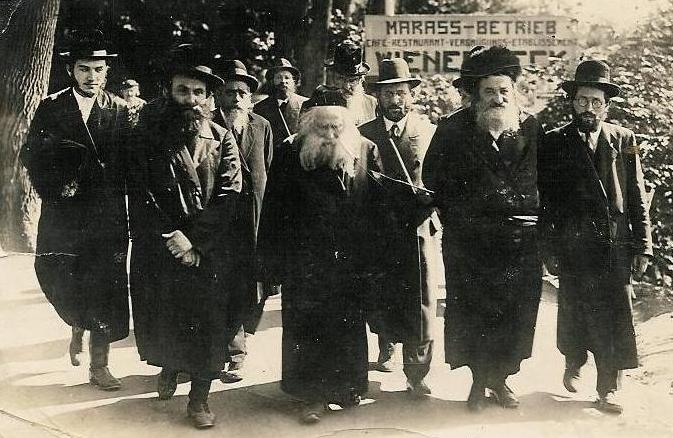
Rabbi Avraham Mordechai Alter, third Gerrer Rebbe (center), walking with his Hasidim in Europe, circa 1920s/1930s.

He became the choirmaster in the main Ger synagogue during the leadership of the fourth Gerrer Rebbe, Rabbi Avraham Mordechai Alter, the Imrei Emes. Singing and leading his choir of 20 boys under the age of bar mitzvah, he also began composing his own melodies. In the Ger tradition, the prayer leader is the only one who sings the words of the prayers with their melody; the choir and congregants sing only the melody. Talmud wrote hundreds of melodies for every part of the prayer service, investing each tune with rich emotional expression. The Gerrer Hasidim would return home after a visit to their Rebbe humming Talmud's new melodies, popularizing them in their hometowns.

Talmud received many requests from other choirs and musicians to compose music for them, but he demurred, reserving his talent solely for the Gerrer Rebbes and their Hasidim. His inspiring melodies became so popular and widely known that it is said that thousands of Gerrer Hasidim sang them in the Nazi death camps. Yehuda Meir Abramowicz, a Gerrer Hasid who later served in the Israeli Knesset, wrote in an article after Talmud's death:

Countless people were slaughtered during the Holocaust years. Among them were many thousands of Gerrer Hasidim who went to their deaths with the tunes of Reb Yaakov Talmud on their lips. When I told this to Reb Yaakov when he was in chutz la'aretz (outside the Land of Israel), he became very emotional. "This is my portion from all my toil", he said. "This is my comfort in my sorrow".

== Move to Mandatory Palestine ==
Talmud married, went into business, and served as a community activist in Poland. He was a representative to the first Knessiah Gedolah of the World Agudath Israel in Frankfurt in 1923. In 1933 he and his family immigrated to Mandatory Palestine. He found work as a kashrut supervisor at Assaf Harofeh Hospital.

In 1940, when the Imrei Emes arrived in Mandatory Palestine after his escape from war-torn Europe, he encouraged Talmud to continue to compose new melodies. Talmud proceeded to compose 20 new pieces for Rosh Hashana, Yom Kippur, Purim, and Shavuot every year, up to and including the year of his death. Additionally, he often composed new melodies for Shabbat prayers such as "Lekhah Dodi" and "Keil Adon" in honor of Special Shabbats, such as Shabbat Shekalim and Shabbat Hanukkah. He traveled to Jerusalem for every Shabbat Mevorchim (the Shabbat preceding a new month) to lead the prayers in the synagogue of the fourth Gerrer Rebbe, Rabbi Yisrael Alter (the Beis Yisrael, who succeeded his father as Rebbe in 1948), and to eat a meal by the Rebbe.

Talmud suffered a heart attack in his later years and underwent surgery in 1963. Shortly after conducting the Ger choir in Jerusalem for Rosh Hashana and Yom Kippur 1965, he fell ill. He died a few days later during the Sukkot holiday. The Beis Yisrael led his funeral.

== Musical style ==
Talmud never studied music. He did not know the rules of musical composition or how to read music. As soon as he composed a new tune, he would ask a professional musician to write down the score. His son, Chaim, often assisted him in this task.

Despite his lack of training, Talmud had a natural ear for music. He composed hundreds of pieces in all music types, including marches, waltzes, and dance tunes. His emotional melodies brought his listeners to tears and stirred their religious fervor. His total output is estimated at over 1,500 melodies, most of them sung by him and his choir in the main Ger synagogue in Poland and in Israel.

In 1955 the Israeli government accorded Talmud special recognition for his 1,000th composition.

Several of Talmud's compositions are still widely sung today. These include his rousing "Shir Hamaalos" march tune, performed at many weddings, and "Lo Sevoshi", sung in Hasidic shtiebels.

== Recordings ==
Cantor David Werdyger, who performed as a soloist in Talmud's choir in Ger at age 12, later arranged and produced hundreds of Talmud's compositions through his recording company, Aderet Records. Talmud collaborated with Werdyger to prepare the first three collections of Songs of the Gerer Chassidim, with Werdyger singing to the accompaniment of a choir and orchestra. Werdyger's recordings include:

- Songs of the Gerer Chassidim Loi Sevoishi (1962)
- A Gerer Melava Malka (1963)
- Songs of the Gerer Chassidim Vehoer Eineinu (1966)
- Ger Holiday Songs (1973)
- Ger Favorite Nigunim (1974)

The contents of these albums were re-mastered and re-released in 2008 in a three-CD set as 1100 Gerrer Niggunim by Aderet Records.

== Quotes ==
- "When my time comes to depart this world and I will be asked by the heavenly court what I accomplished, I will answer that I brought some happiness to Jews".
