= Mendy Werdyger =

American Hasidic Jewish Composer and Singer

Mendy Werdyger (born 1959,) is an American Hasidic singer, songwriter, and owner of the Jewish record label Aderet [Records] Music Corp. and its retail store Mostly Music in Brooklyn. In 2010, he released his fifth studio album.

== Biography ==
Werdyger grew up in Brooklyn, attending yeshivas from grade school through kollel. At age 21, he joined his father's business, Aderet Records. Mendy sang in the choirs on recordings made by his father, David Werdyger and on some of brother Mordechai Ben David's albums as well as those of Avraham Fried, Dov Levine, Yerachmiel Begun, and others.

Since 1991, he has been the cantor for the Rosh Hashana and Yom Kippur prayer services at a Gerrer shtiebel in Boro Park, Brooklyn.

Werdyger has re-mastered four CDs using computer software to clear up the distortions on the original records.

== Family ==
Werdyger is a son of the hazzan (cantor) David Werdyger, brother of singer Mordechai Ben David, and uncle of singer Yeedle Werdyger (Mordechai's son). His son Yisroel released his second album in 2010.

== Discography ==
=== Solo albums ===
- Chaverim Vol. 1: Chaverim Kol Yisroel (1990) (with Moshe Laufer)
- Chaverim 2 (1991) (with Moshe Laufer)
- Zakeinu (1994) (prod. Yehuda Kaplan)
- Chaverim 3: Ani Holech B'Simcha (1996)
- B'Hadras Kodesh (2004) (with Dudi Kalish)
- Sadigur Hokem Malchus Dovid (2005)
- Sefira Beshira (2007) (with Sruly Werdyger and child soloist Aharon Levi)
- Tomid B'Chol Yom (2010)

=== Collaborative albums ===
- Yom Shekulo Shabbos U'Menucha: Songs of 3 Generations (1993) (comp. David Werdyger; with Mordechai Ben David and Yeedle Werdyger)
- Special Moments With: The Wedding Album (1995) (with Mordechai Ben David and Yeedle Werdyger)
- Around The Year 4 (1990) (prod. Suki & Ding; with Avrumi Flam, Michoel Streicher, Dov Hoffman, and Yerachmiel Begun)
- Shabbos with the Werdygers (2006) (with David, Mordechai, Yeedle, Sruly, Meyer, and Chaim Werdyger)
- Hameorerim (2008) (with Mordechai Ben David, Shmuel Broner, Efraim Mendelson, Moshe Weintraub, Shloime Cohen, Gilad Potolski, Yosef Karduner, Sruli Ginsberg, Yanki Eckstein, Simcha Levinstein)
- Shabbos with the Werdygers 2 (2010) (with David, Sruli, Mordechai, Chaim, Yeedle, and Meyer Werdyger)

=== Featured on ===
- David Werdyger, Father & Sons Biglal Avos (1984) (with Mordechai Ben David and Yaron Gershovsky)
- Various, Lev V'Nefesh: The Music of Abie Rotenberg (1990)
- Gideon Levine and Various,The Best of the Best (1996)
- Various, Unity for Justice (2010)
