= Dan Nichols =

American Jewish rock musician (born 1969)

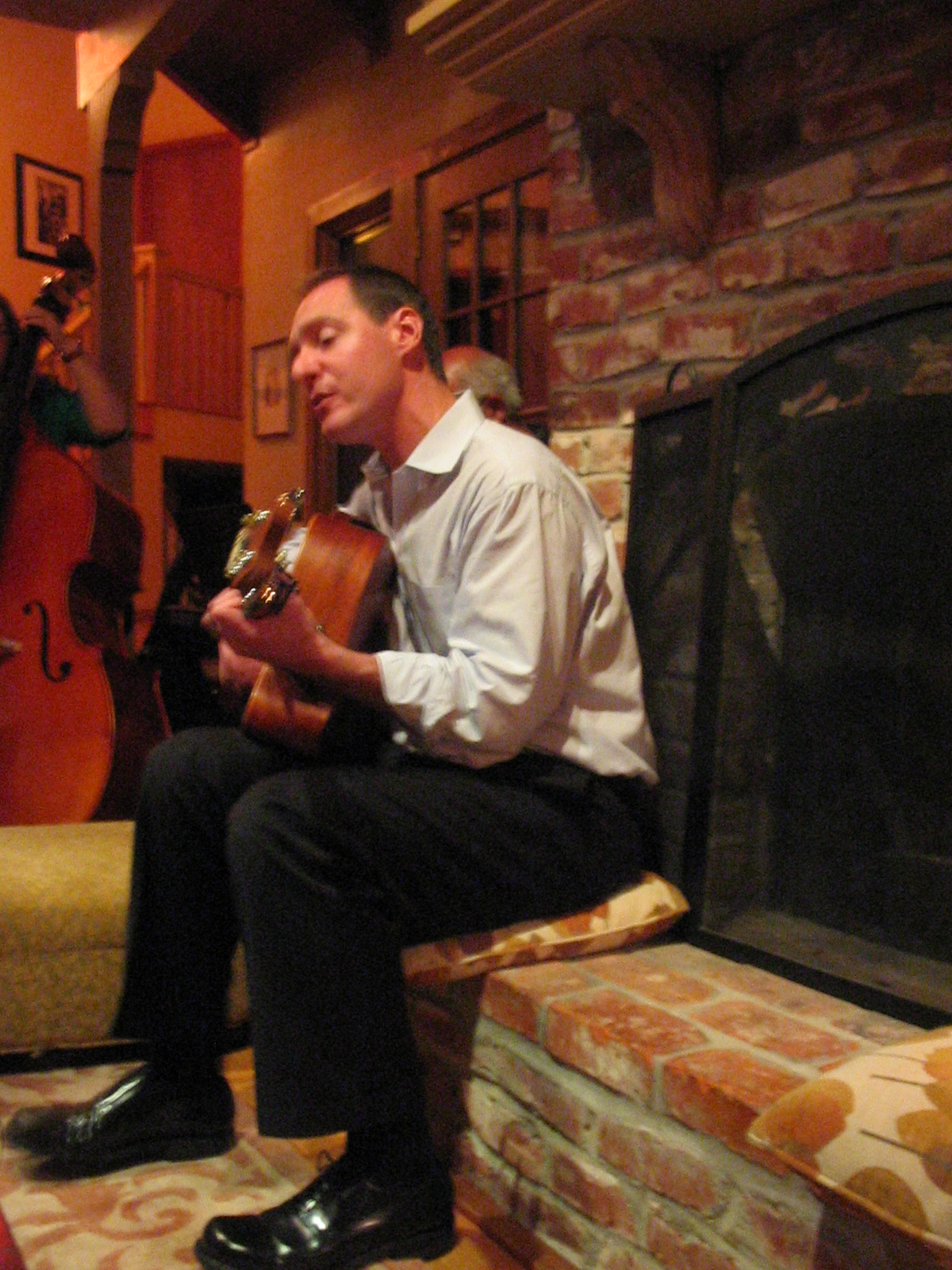
- Dan Nichols at a Shabbat gathering for Rodef Sholom where he is artist-in-residence.

Background information
- Genres: Jewish rock, Contemporary Jewish religious music
- Occupation: Singer-songwriter
- Instruments: Vocals, guitar, piano, keyboards
- Website: dannicholsmusic.com

Daniel Nichols (born 1969) is an American Jewish rock musician, composer, and song leader, and founder of the band, E18hteen.

== Biography ==
Dan Nichols was born in 1969 in Indiana. He attended Pike Township Schools in Indianapolis. He and his parents converted to Judaism when he was 7, after his mother "went on a quest for spirituality". He attended Indianapolis Hebrew Congregation and went to summer sleep-away camp at URJ Goldman Union Camp Institute in Zionsville, Indiana. He lives in Raleigh, North Carolina. Dan Nichols is an alum of the University of North Carolina at Chapel Hill where he received a bachelor's degree in music in 1992.

== Music career ==
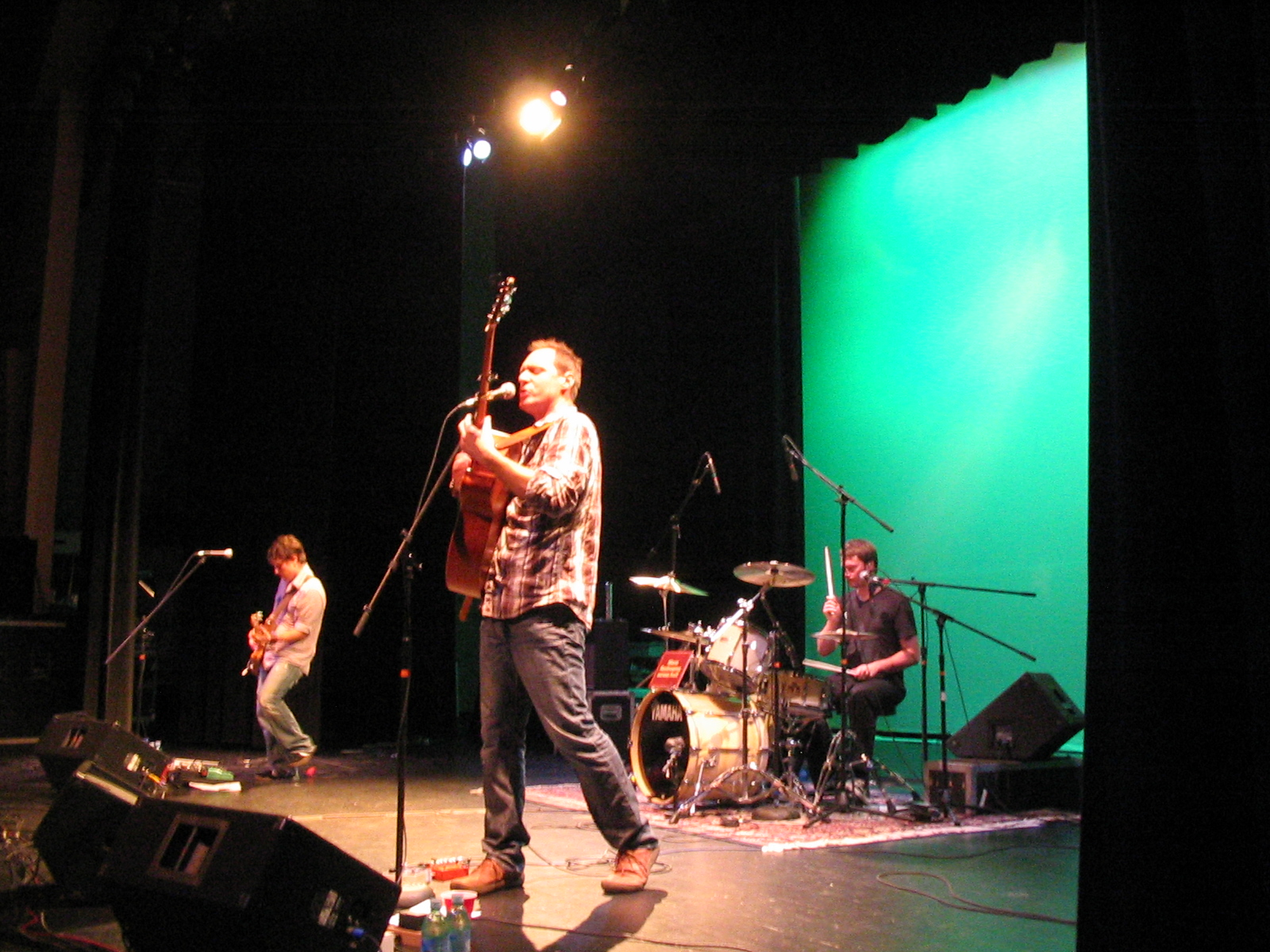
Dan Nichols and Eighteen live at the Osher Marin JCC. October 2010.

In 1994, while living in Nashville, Tennessee, Nichols met Mason Cooper and created the band, Eighteen, performing rock music with Jewish themes and Hebrew prayers. Prior to Eighteen, Nichols was a member of the band Olskies. Nichols previously worked as a cantorial soloist at Congregation Micah in Brentwood, Tennessee, and also has a background in opera. Nichols performs at synagogues, Hillels, Jewish Community Centers and Jewish youth camps nationwide. His work has been recognized by the Union for Reform Judaism and NFTY who have featured him as an artist at Biennials and Conventions, and included his music on their Ruach compilation albums and songbooks. Nichols was a faculty member of the annual song-leading conference Hava Nashira in Oconomowoc, Wisconsin for many years. In 2006, NFTY awarded Nichols its highest honor, Lifetime Membership, in recognition of his years of commitment and outstanding contribution to Reform Jewish youth. In 2008, Nichols and Eighteen performed a live concert for Sirius XM's Radio Hanukkah Jewish Stars concert series, and a concert at Masada for Israel's 60th anniversary. Dan Nichols has also been an artist in residence at Congregation Rodef Sholom in San Rafael, California since 2008. Nichols is the subject of the 2013 documentary film Road to Eden: Rock & Roll Sukkot which follows Dan and his band Eighteen as they travelled in an RV across the American South during the holiday of Sukkot.

== Discography ==
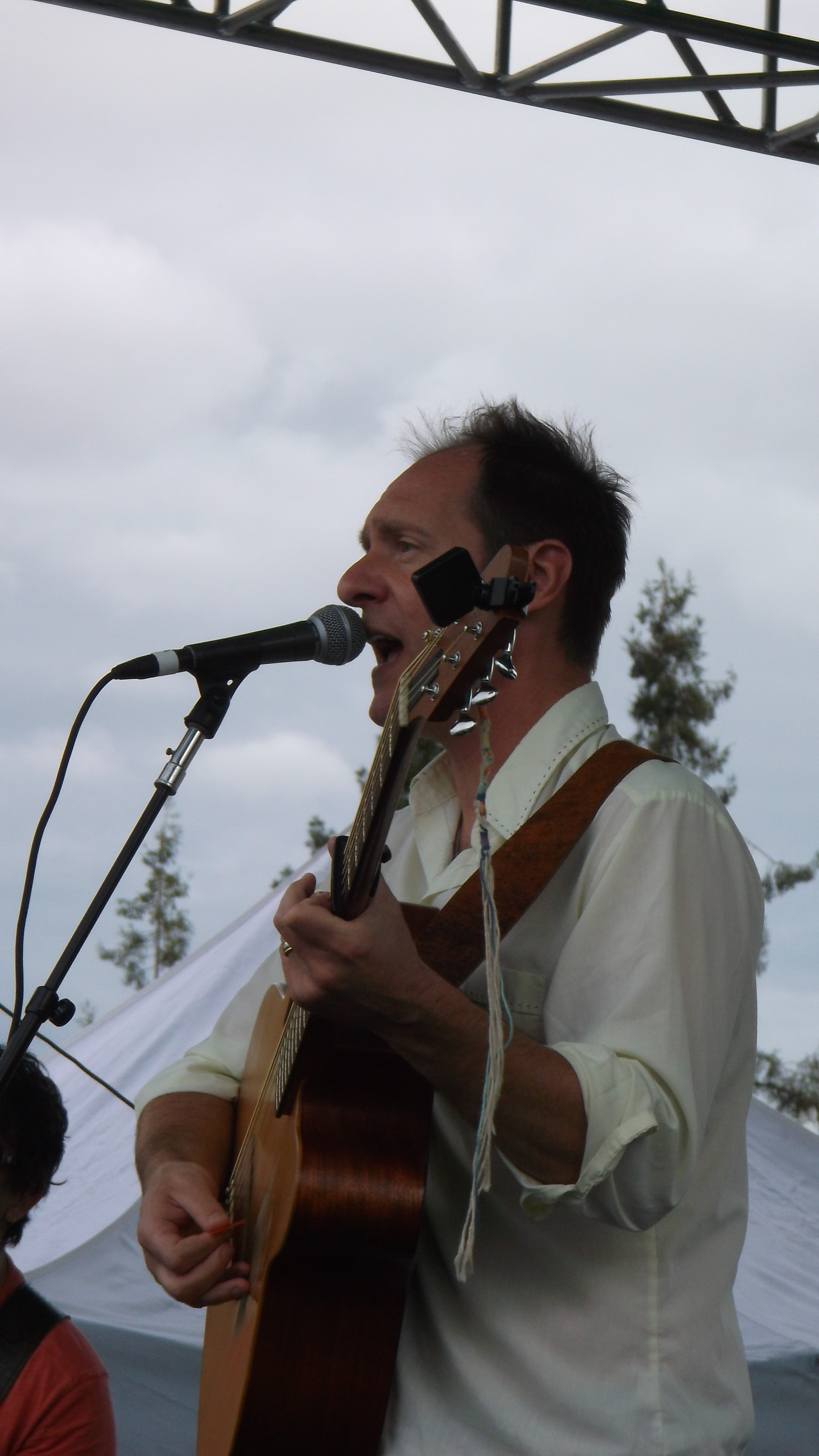
Dan Nichols singing at Jewish Music Fest in Los Gatos, California.

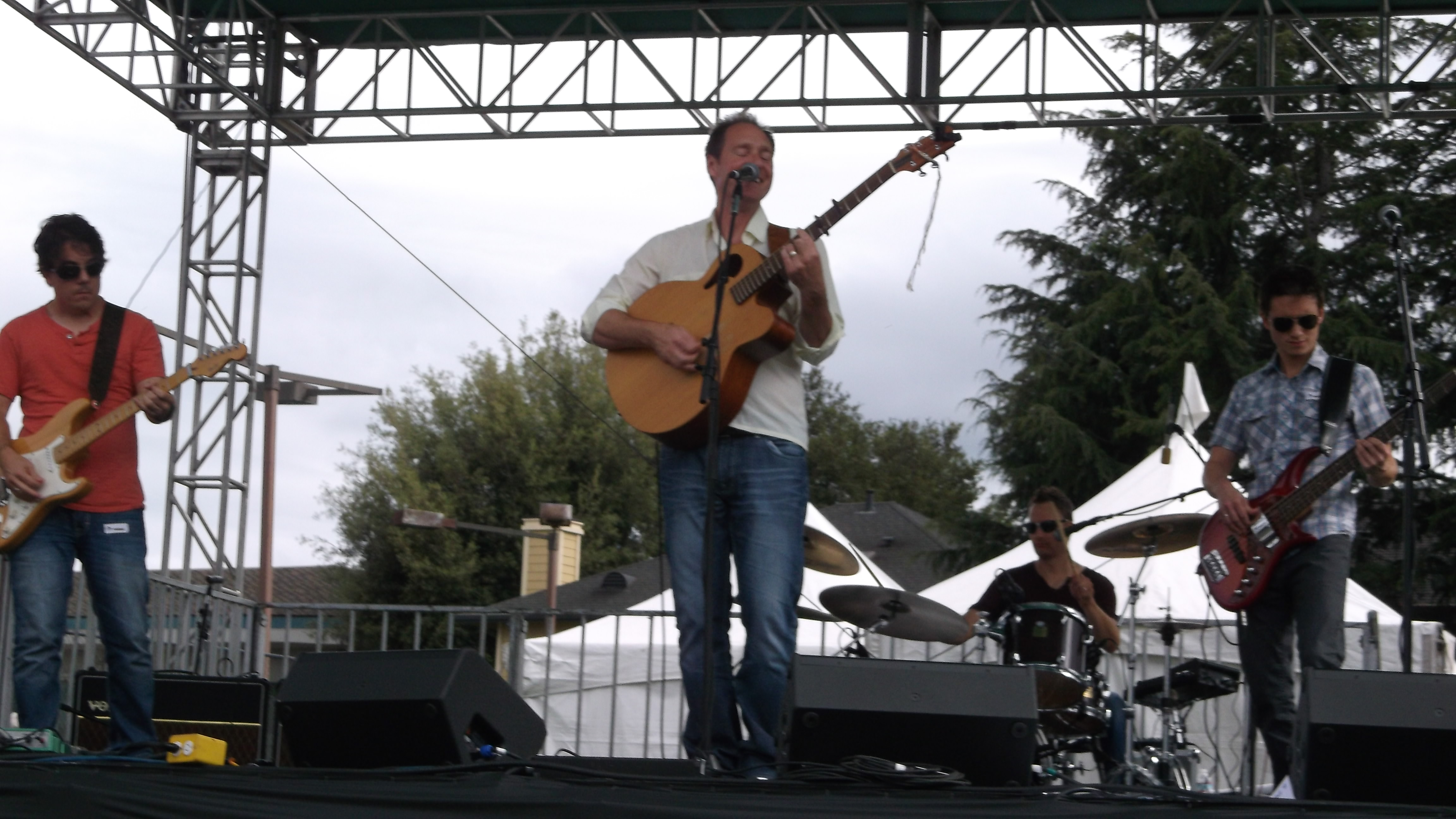
Dan Nichols & 18 performing at Jewish Music Fest in Los Gatos, California.

- Life (1996)
- The Day After Tomorrow (1997)
- Be Strong (2001)
- Kol HaShabbat (2002)
- My Heart is in the East (2004)
- The Roots (2008)
- To the Mountains (2009)
- The Sound of What Cannot Be Seen (2012)
- Road to Eden Soundtrack (2014)
- Beautiful & Broken (2015)
- I Believe (2016)
- I Will Not Fear (2019)
- One Who Will Struggle: Music for Prayer (2020)
- What Could Go Wrong? (2021)

=== Compilations ===
Greatest Hits

- 18 on 18 (2010)

NFTY Compilations

- "L'takein (The Na Na Song)" appears on Ruach 5761
- "Pitchu Li" and "Kehillah Kedoshah" appear on Ruach 5763
- "My Heart is in the East" appears on Ruach 5765
- "Hashkiveinu" and "LeDor VaDor" appear on Ruach 5767
- "Or Chadash" and "Esai Einei" appear on Ruach 5769
- "Sweet as Honey" and "Hoshiah" appear on Ruach 5771
- "All this Rain" and "Mayim" appear on Ruach 5773
- "Eternity Utters a Day" appears on Ruach 5775

Celebrate Series

- "Kumi Lach" appears on Celebrate Jewish Love Songs

Collaborations

- The Remix – EP with Alan Goodis (2015)
- So is Life! – Boxt, Dreskin, Nelson & Nichols (2016)
