= Kids of Courage =

American nonprofit organization

Kids of Courage is a non-profit charity based in the United States. The organization opened in 2008 with a commitment to "change the way people look at illness, and open up a world of support, hope and opportunity for every sick child and family, no matter how serious the diagnosis is."

== Purpose ==
Kids of Courage was founded by author and professor of medicine Dr. Stuart Ditchek, paramedic Howard Kafka and Arthur Adlerstein. Its mission is to enable children with serious medical conditions to travel, experience adventure and provide them with a social environment where they can meet other children with similar medical backgrounds. Diagnoses include familial dysautonomia, muscular dystrophy and childhood cancer.

The organization specializes in medically supervised trips for children and young adults with serious medical diagnoses.

== Summer Trip ==
A unique traveling Summer Camp for critically ill children, who are given a chance to disconnect from their daily struggles and experience freedom and adventure like every child. Under strict medical supervision, they visit parks and attractions, bond with new friends, meet celebrities, and experience the Dream & Wish trip of a lifetime.
