= Rodef Sholom (San Rafael, California) =

Reform Jewish synagogue in San Rafael, California, US

Congregation Rodef Sholom
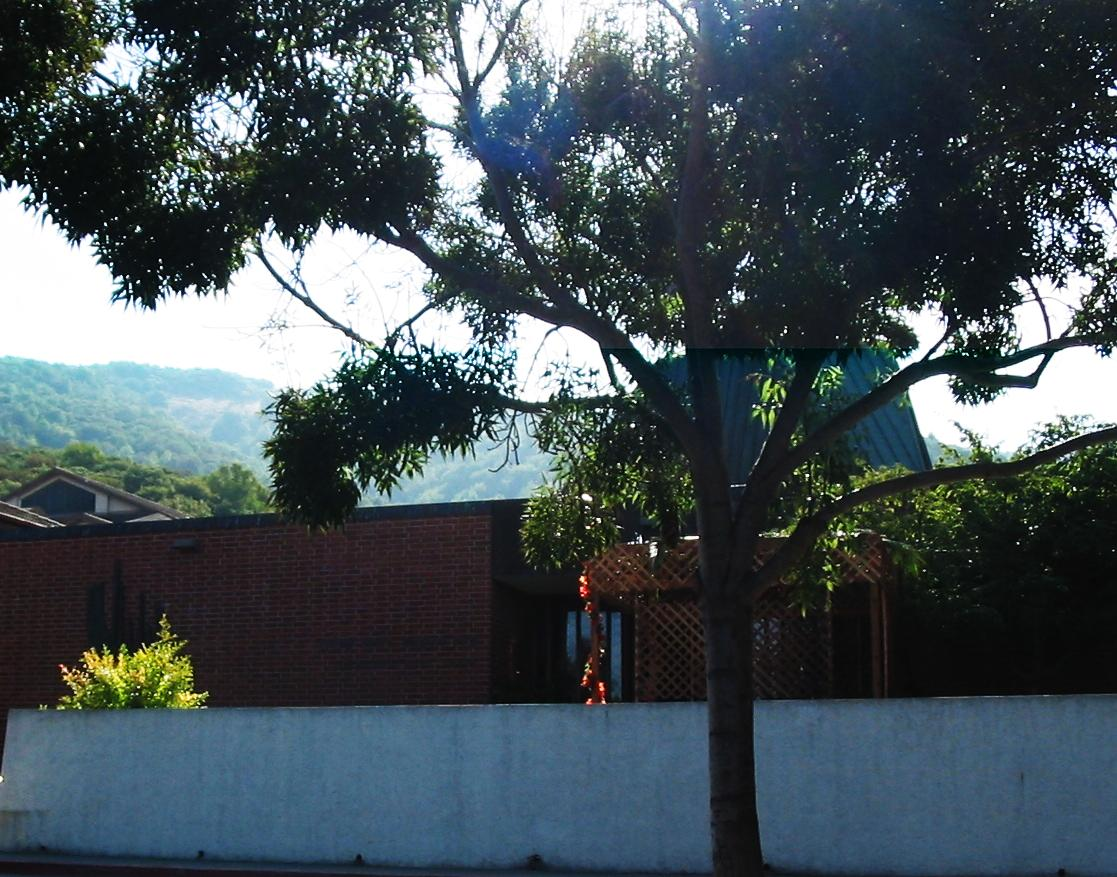
- The synagogue building, in 2010

- Location in San Francisco Bay Area, California

Religion
- Affiliation: Reform Judaism
- Ecclesiastical or organizational status: Synagogue
- Governing body: Union for Reform Judaism (member)
- Leadership: Rabbi Stacy Friedman; Rabbi Elana Rosen-Brown (Associate); Rabbi Lara Regev
- Status: Active

Location
- Location: 170 North San Pedro, San Rafael, Marin County, California
- Country: United States
- Interactive map of Congregation Rodef Sholom
- Coordinates: 38°01′24″N 122°32′49″W

Architecture
- Architects: Marquis & Stoller
- Type: Synagogue architecture
- Established: 1956 (as a congregation)
- Groundbreaking: 1961
- Completed: 1962

Website
- rodefsholom.org

Congregation Rodef Sholom (transliterated from Hebrew as "Pursuers of peace") is a Reform Jewish congregation and synagogue, located on the Lonee C. Hoytt Jewish Campus, at 170 North San Pedro, in San Rafael, Marin County, California, in the United States.

The congregation was founded in 1956 and Shabbat services were held at the Marin Jewish Community Center, established in 1946 at Mission and Forbes Street, until 1962 when it moved to its current location. The congregation shares a campus with the Osher Marin JCC and the Brandeis Hillel Day School. Rodef Sholom has been affiliated with the Union for Reform Judaism since 1957.

== History ==
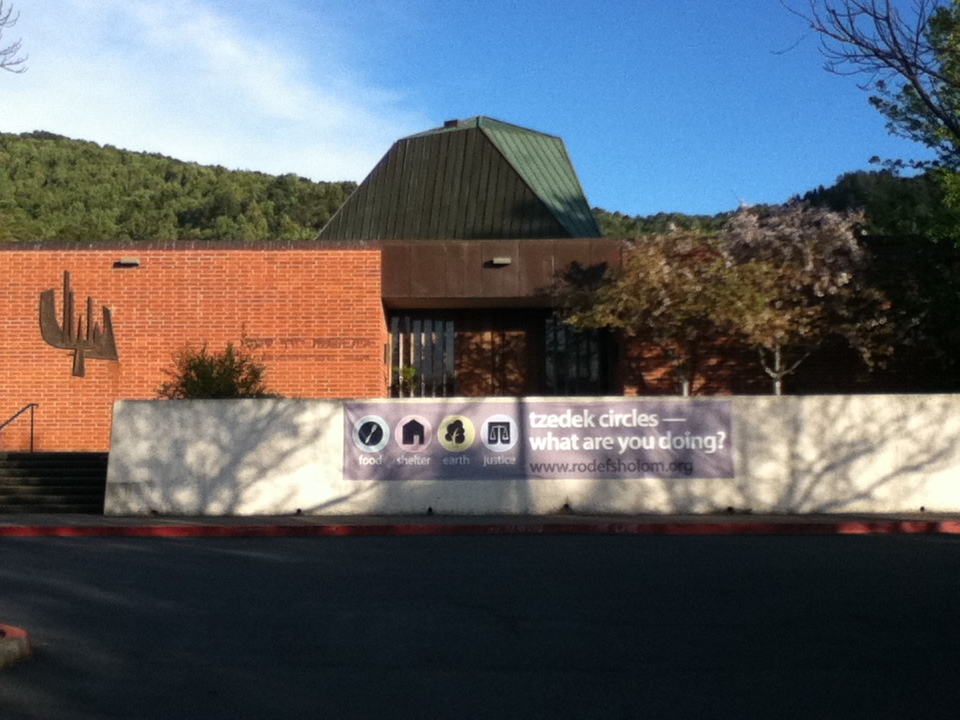
Congregation Rodef Sholom.

During the 1940s the Marin Jewish community would gather at houses in the community for Shabbat services. B'nai B'rith, Hadassah, and Council of Jewish Women also established chapters within the county, and in 1948, the Marin Jewish Community Center was opened at 1618 Mission Avenue. The JCC held kabbalat shabbat and shabbat services each week in its sanctuary, and out of these services grew Rodef Sholom in 1956 and Kol Shofar in 1962.

Congregation Rodef Sholom was founded in 1956 by Harry Albert, Abe Blumenfeld, Sidney Braverman, Samuel B. Herst, David J. Rosenberg, Sidney Rudey, Aaron Schwartz, and Julius Selinger. The congregation grew from 64 families upon establishment to 143 by the high holy days. Rabbi Julius A. Liebert and Cantor Louis Roller, the congregation's first clergy, led services in the JCC sanctuary. The temple sisterhood, then called the Ladies Auxiliary, formed that same year. During its first year, membership was divided between a Reform or Conservative affiliation. However, in 1957, under the direction of Rabbi Morton Hoffman, Rodef Sholom formally became a Reform congregation by joining the Union of American Hebrew Congregations. By 1959, the Jewish population of Marin County was 2,700 with 225 families belonging to Rodef Sholom, and over 300 children attending its religious school.

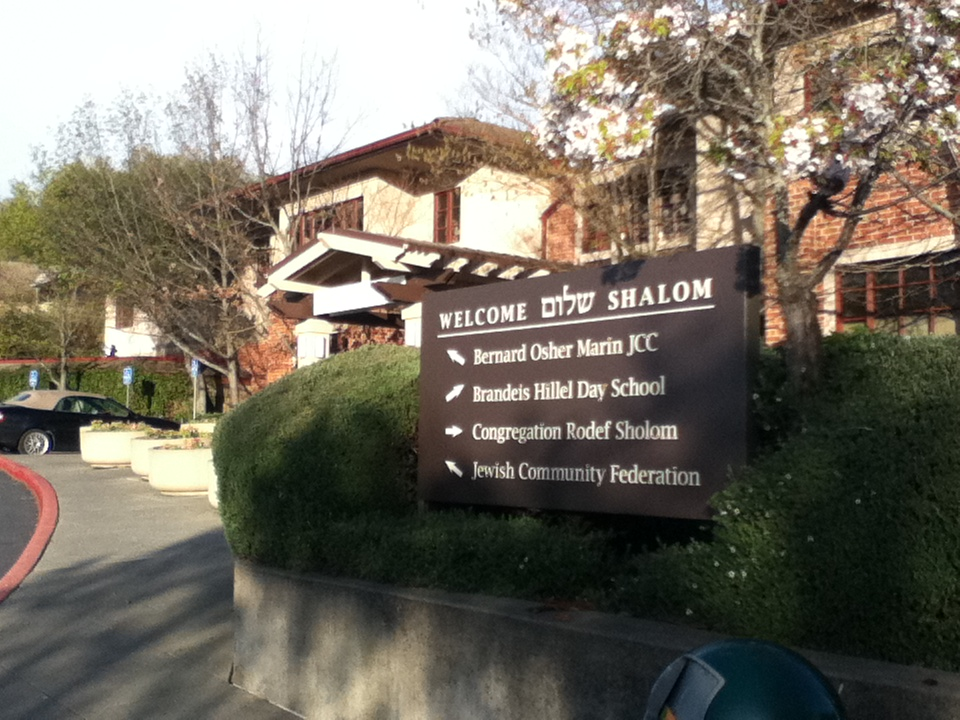
Congregation Rodef Sholom shares a campus with the Osher Marin JCC, pictured here.

On June 4, 1961, after 4 years of fundraising, the community held a groundbreaking ceremony for its new synagogue, which would be completed and dedicated on May 4, 1962. Jane Slater Marquis and Claude Stoller designed the architecture of the building. The new building featured a stained glass window in the hexagonal high ceiling that was donated by the Koch family, stained glass windows at the front entrance donated by Mrs. Harry Albert, and an organ from the Men's Club. Rabbi Morton Hoffman left the congregation in 1970, and Rabbi David Davis became the new senior rabbi, serving for 7 years.

In 1977 Rabbi Michael Berenbaum was hired to lead the congregation. That same year the congregation began holding high holy day services at the Marin County Civic Center, which allowed for the entire congregation to worship together. Several associate rabbis served under Rabbi Barenbaum including Rabbi Robert Daum (1986–1993), Rabbi Miriam Baitch (1982–1986), and Rabbi Lee Bycel (1979–1982). Barenbaum became Rodef Sholom's longest serving rabbi when he retired in 2003 after 27 years of service. Barenbaum was honored by Senator Barbara Boxer on a February 2003 session. During his tenure, the congregation's numbers grew from 300 members to 1,100 families. In 2003, after 10 years of service as Rodef Sholom's associate rabbi, Rabbi Stacy Friedman became senior rabbi.

In 2009, Rodef Sholom received a Next Dor grant from Synagogue 3000 to develop its NITA program, led by Rabbi Noa Kushner. The program's name, NITA, comes from the Hebrew word meaning "we will grow," and aims to bring unaffiliated Generation X and Y Jews into a comfortable non-synagogue environment where they can "do Jewish stuff." The group meets for havdalah, hikes, storahtelling, and once-monthly kabbalat shabbat services.

=== Religious school ===
In 1944, the first Jewish organization in Marin was formed, the Marin Jewish Sunday School Association, which arose from the need for standardized Jewish education within the community. Throughout the next few decades classes met at Marin Country Day School, above the Tamalpais movie theater, The San Rafael military academy, Scout Hall, and the San Anselmo Library. On November 12, 1965, Rodef Sholom's Religious School building was dedicated. In 1967, vandals burned down Blumenfeld Hall, and some classes were held at Blessed Sacrament Church during the rebuilding.

Brandeis Hillel Day School established its Marin campus in the facility in 1978. The school is accredited by the California Association of Independent Schools and the Western Association of Schools and Colleges, and affiliated with the Bureau of Jewish Education, RAVSAK, Northern California Jewish Community Day School Network, National Association of Independent Schools, and JESNA.

== Rabbinical leaders ==
The following individuals have served as rabbi of Congregation Rodef Sholom:

Ordinal	Officeholder	Term start	Term end	Time in office	Notes
1	Julius A. Liebert	1956	1957	0–1 years	
2	Morton Hoffman	1957	1968	10–11 years	
3	David Davis	1968	1976	7–8 years	
4	Michael Berenbaum	1977	2003	25–26 years	Subsequently, Emeritus
5	Lee Bycel	1979	1982	2–3 years	
6	Miriam Baitch	1982	1986	3–4 years	
7	Robert Daum	1986	1993	6–7 years	
8	Stacy Friedman	1993	incumbent	32–33 years	Associate in 1993; Senior since 2003
9	Elana Rosen-Brown	2014	incumbent	11–12 years	Assistant in 2014; Associate since 2017

Additionally, Michael Lezak served as Associate Rabbi between 2003 and 2017; and Noa Kushner served as Assistant Rabbi between 2005 and 2011.

== Gallery ==
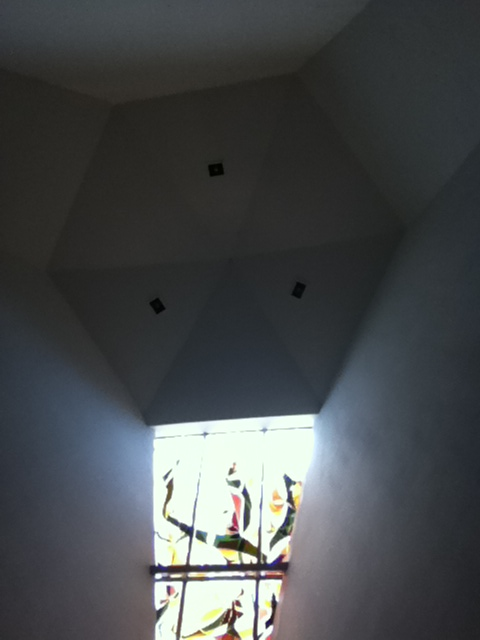
Congregation Rodef Sholom's hexagonal high ceiling.

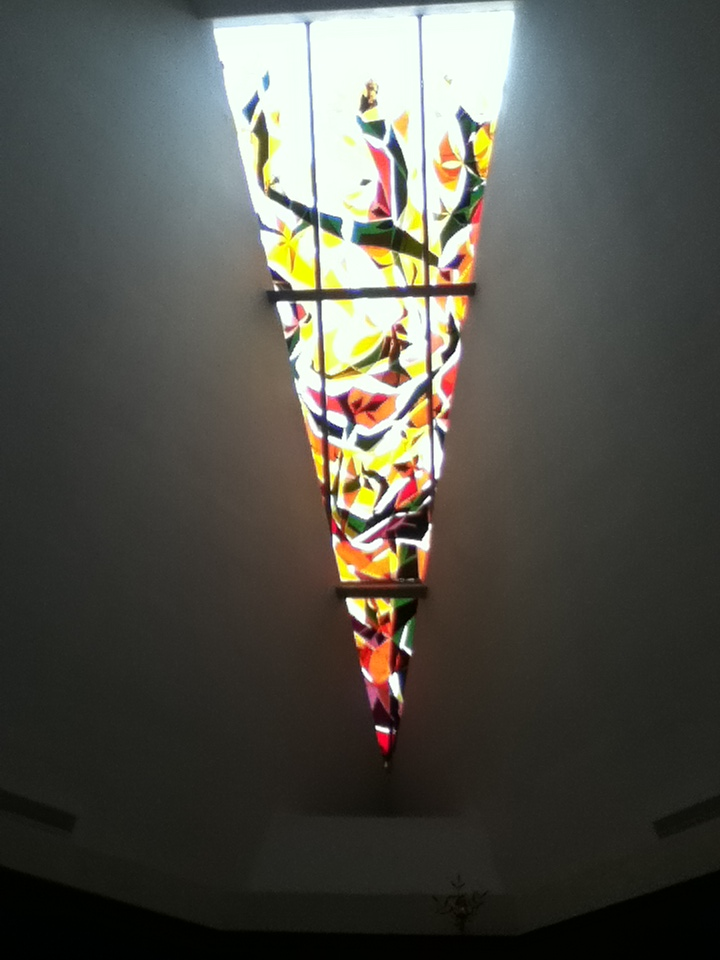
Congregation Rodef Sholom's stained glass window.

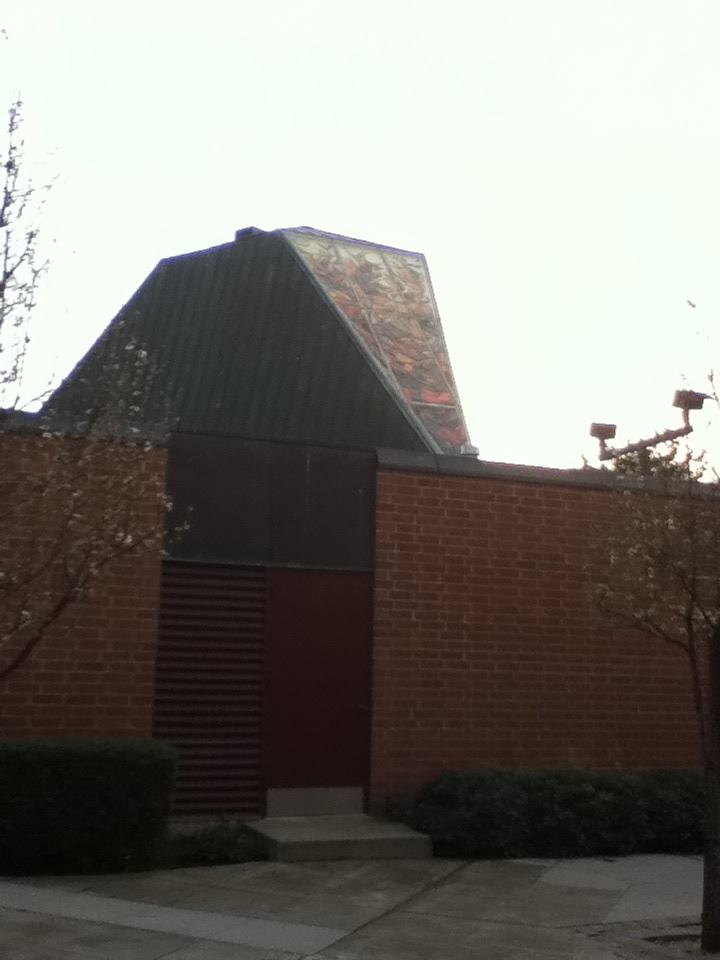
Congregation Rodef Sholom's stained glass window as seen from outside.

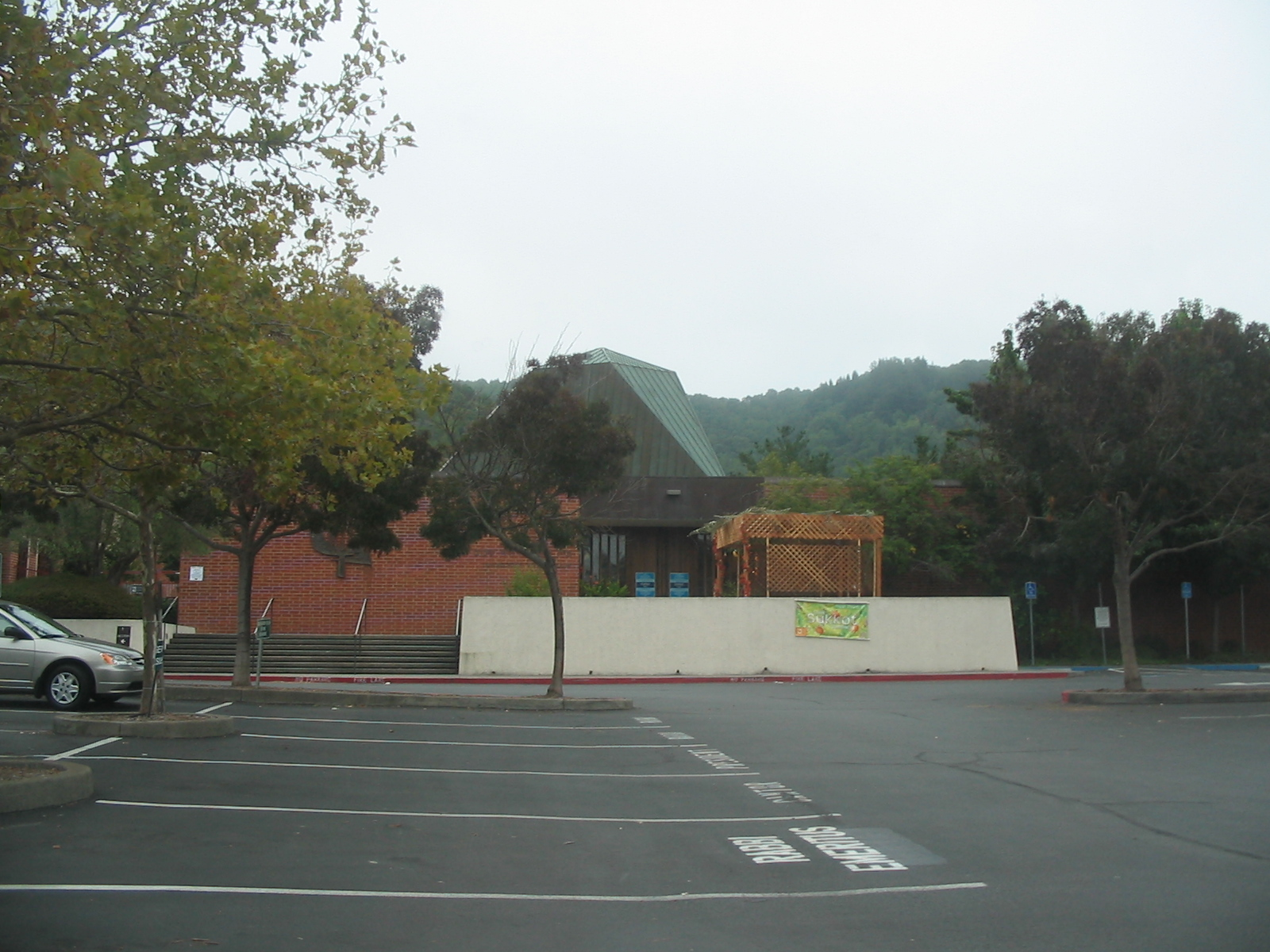
Congregation Rodef Sholom during Sukkot 5770 (2009).
