= David Werdyger =

Polish-American Jewish cantor

- Born: 30 October 1919; Poland
- Died: 2 April 2014 (aged 94) United States
- Genres: Hazzanut (Cantorial), Jewish music
- Occupations: Hazzan, travel agent
- Years active: 1950–2000s
- Label: Aderet Records

David Werdyger (Hebrew: אלתר דוד יצחק ורדיגר; 30 October 1919 – 2 April 2014) was a Polish-American Hasidic hazzan and solo singer. A Holocaust survivor who was incarcerated in several Nazi concentration camps, including the factory run by Oskar Schindler, Werdyger moved to Brooklyn, New York, after World War II and began recording albums featuring the music of the Bobov, Boyan, Skulen, Melitz, Radomsk, and Ger Hasidic dynasties, recording 60 albums in all. He also established the Jewish record label Aderet Records, now managed and owned by his son Mendy Werdyger.

He was the father of singer Mordechai Ben David and the grandfather of singer Yeedle Werdyger (Mordechai's son). Werdyger collaborated with Velvel Pasternak, among others, in his recordings.

== Early life ==
Werdyger was the youngest of four sons and four daughters born to Yisrael Aryeh Werdyger, a well-to-do wholesaler of men's shirts and dry goods and a prominent member of the Gerrer Hasidic community of Kraków (Cracow), to which the family moved shortly after David's birth. He says that at the age of six he became the soloist in the choir of the Eizik Yeikeles Synagogue in Kraków, and that at age 12 he was invited by Yankel Talmud, the leader of the Gerrer choir, to be a soloist in that choir in the town of Ger.

== Holocaust years ==
With the Nazi occupation of Poland in September 1939, Werdyger was subject to frequent arrests and forced labor on the streets of Kraków. In the summer of 1940, when the Nazis ordered all Jews to leave the city, Werdyger's family moved to an uncle's home in Proszowice. In response to rumors of a mass deportation, he, his unmarried sister Yettie, and his parents went into hiding with 16 others in a bunker in their uncle's warehouse, where they were cared for by a Polish employee. Three weeks later, they sneaked into the Podgórze ghetto of Kraków. From there, his parents bought their way out of the ghetto into Sosnowice, where one of their married daughters was living and never saw them again.

In the ghetto, worked in forced labor battalions, and when a mass deportation took place in the Podgórze ghetto, he went into hiding with 15 others. Two weeks later, his group was found and taken with 180 other ghetto residents to the Kraków-Płaszów concentration camp to be shot by firing squad. Each man passed before German Nazi camp commandant Amon Göth; Werdyger later said that when it was his turn, Göth asked him what type of work he did. "I am a professional singer, and I have a trained soprano voice," he replied. "Would you like to hear something?" Göth said, "Sing the song you Jews chant when you bury your dead." Werdyger began singing the traditional Jewish prayer for the dead, El Molei Rachamim ("God, Full of Compassion"). Göth then directed Werdyger to the camp rather than to the firing squad; he was one of the 40 men saved from execution that day.

Werdyger was an inmate in the Płaszów for five months, after which he was transferred to the nearby factory under the direction of Oskar Schindler. He also spent time in the Mauthausen-Gusen concentration camp and the Linz labor camp, where he was liberated on Saturday, 5 May 1945.

== Hazzan and Hasidic singer ==
After the war Werdyger married Malka Godinger. Several months later they left for Paris, France, where they had a son. Four years later, in February 1950, they sailed to New York.

The couple had three more sons in America including Mordechai Ben David and Mendy Werdyger.

In New York Werdyger worked as a hazzan in the Warshever Shul, then the Chasam Sofer Shul on the Lower East Side, then New Lots Talmud Torah Shul. He also opened a travel agency, Werdyger Travel, in Brooklyn.

Later, Werdyger moved to the Rabbi Meir Simcha Hakohein Shul in East Flatbush, headed by Chabad, Jacob J. Hecht, who had Werdyger sing cantorial selections on his weekly radio program, Shema Yisrael. In 1959 Werdyger made his first record, Tefillah L'David. In 1960 he recorded another album, Mizmor LeDavid.

Werdyger later started his own recording label, Aderet Records, to record Hasidic niggunim (melodies). He released Songs of the Gerer Chassidim Loi Sevoishi in 1962. His next album was A Melitzer Oneg Shabbos. His third album, A Gerer Melava Malka, featured a solo by his young son, Mordechai. Subsequently, Werdyger recorded the niggunim of the Skulener Rebbe, Rabbi Eliezer Zusia Portugal, on Skulaner Chassidic Nigunim Vol. 1 and Skulaner Nigunim 2, and of the Bobover Rebbe, Rabbi Shlomo Halberstam, on Bobover Niggunim.

Werdyger made concert appearances in the United States, Canada, and England, in which he sang both cantorial and Hasidic melodies. He produced an album for the Boyaner Hasidim on which he and his son Mordechai sang together, accompanied by the Boyaner's men's choir.

Werdyger sang on two Shabbos with the Werdygers collections produced by his son, Chaim. In 1997, he contributed cantorial renditions for the PBS documentary A Life Apart: Hasidism in America.

== Personal life ==
Following the death of his wife in 1980, Werdyger married Sarah Wercberger, widow of Wolf Wercberger and daughter of Rabbi Osher Zelig Marton, a dayan and shochet in pre-war Romania.

In 1993 Werdyger published his autobiography, Songs of Hope, as part of the Holocaust Diaries series published by CIS Publishers.

He died on 2 April 2014 at the age of 94.

== Discography ==
=== Solo albums ===
- Tefillah L'David (1959)
- L'Dovid Mizmor (1960)
- Songs of the Gerer Chassidim Loi Sevoishi (1962)
- A Melitzer Oneg Shabbos (1962)
- A Gerer Melava Malka (1963)
- Sholosh Seudos Melodies (1965)
- Songs of the Gerer Chassidim Vehoer Eineinu (1966)
- In Cheder Arein (1966)
- Bobover Niggunim (1968) (child vocalist is the present Bobover Rebbe, Rabbi Ben Zion Aryeh Leibish Halberstam)
- Skulaner Chassidic Nigunim Vol. 1 (1968)
- Songs of Camp Kol-Ree-Nah (1969)
- "Chassidic Nigunim" (1970)
- Ger Holiday Songs (1973)
- Gerer Favorites (1974)
- Skulaner Nigunim 2 (1977) (Neginah Orchestra / Yisroel Lamm)
- Melitzer Oneg Shabbos 2 (1979) (Yad B'zemer Orchestra / Hershel Lebovits)
- Satmarer Niggunim (1980) (Yad B'zemer Orchestra /Hershel Lebovits)
- Boyaner Nigunim (1980) (Neginah Orchestra / Yisroel Lamm)
- Sadegora Niggunim (1981) (Mordechai Ben David Orchestra / Hershel Lebovits)
- Eso Einai El Hehorim (1985) (Neginah Orchestra / Yisroel Lamm)
- A Shabbos With David Werdyger (1990) (Moshe Laufer)
- Best Cantorial (1995)
- Chassidic Collage (1995)

=== Collaborations ===
- Fathers and Sons Biglal Avos (1984) (with Mordechai Ben David, Mendy Werdyger (Yaron Gershovsky)
- 3 Generations: Songs Composed by David Werdyger (1993) (Yisroel Lamm)
- Shabbos with the Werdygers (2006) (with Mordechai Ben David, Mendy Werdyger, Yeedle Werdyger, Dovid Gabay, Avi Newmark, and Cantor Yakov Yitzchok Rosenfeld) (Nochi Krohn)
- In Those Days At This Time (Bayamim Haheim Bazman Hazeh) 2 (2006)
- Shabbos with the Werdygers 2 (2010) (Mona Rosenblum)

== Sources ==
- Werdyger, Duvid (1993). Songs of Hope. Lakewood, N.J.: CIS Publishers. ISBN 1-56062-226-1.

http://www.theyeshivaworld.com/news/boruch-dayan-emmes/224712/petira-of-famed-chazan-david-werdyger-zl-father-of-mordechai-ben-david.html
