= Yeshiva Boys Choir =

- Choir
- Founded: 2003
- Founder: Eli Gerstner, Yossi Newman
- Website: theyeshivaboyschoir.com

The Yeshiva Boys Choir, also known as YBC, is a contemporary Jewish religious music boys choir. The choir is conducted by Yossi Newman, and their songs are composed, arranged and produced by Eli Gerstner.

Quickly after their first album, they became well known around the Orthodox Jewish community. They went on to release many hit songs, and then toured the world putting on shows. Some of their greatest hits include "V'ohavta" (2005), "Shabichi" (2007), "Daddy Come Home" (2011), "Ah Ah Ah (Ashrei)" (2011), and "Adir" (2014). They have also found success with the Hanukkah songs "Mizmor Shir" (2011), "Shehechiyanu" (2011), and "Those Were the Nights" (2011).

== Discography ==
- YBC 1 - Kol Hamispallel (2003)
- YBC 2 - V'ohavta L'Reacha Komocha (2005)
- YBC Live! (2005)
- YBC 3 - Shabichi (2007)
- YBC Live! 2 (2007)
- YBC 4 - Sh'moy Shel Melech (2009)
- YBC Live! 3 (2009)
- YBC 5 - Chanukah (2010)
- YBC Live! 4 (2011)
- Amein Amein Amein (A cappella) (2012)
- YBC 6 - Modeh Ani (2014)
- Our Greatest Hits (2019)

== Singles List ==
- Ah Ah Ah (Ashrei) (2011)
- Ad Olam (feat. Benny Friedman & The Chevra) (2013)
- Yihalilu (2014)
- Tov (2017)
- Mi X6 (2019)
- Ul'shalom (2021)
