= Uncle Moishy =

20th-century American children's entertainer

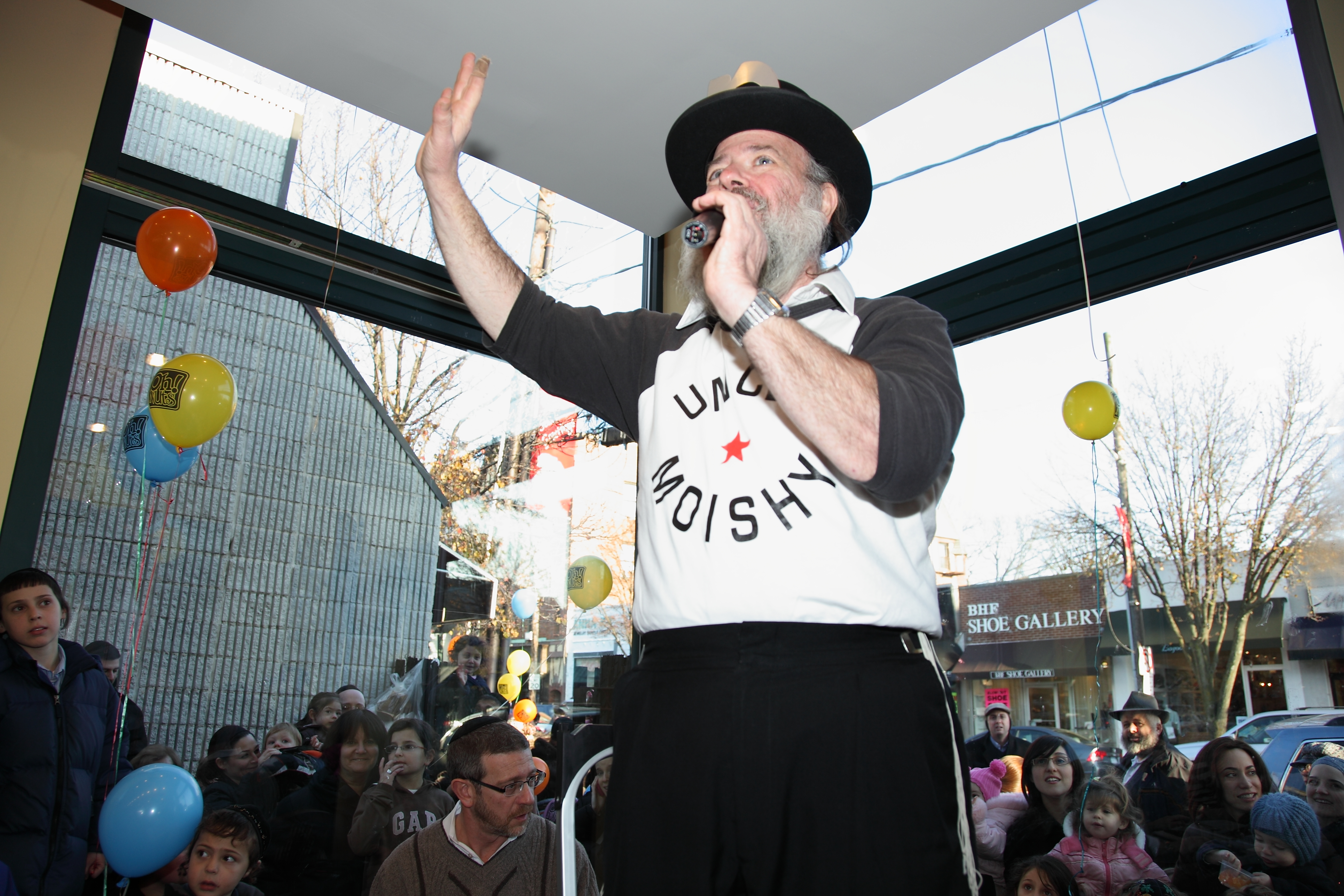
- Tanenbaum performing in 2009

Background information
- Born: Milton Tanenbaum; Toronto, Canada
- Years active: 1975–present
- Labels: Suki and Ding; Sonic Duo
- Website: www.unclemoishyworld.com

Moshe Tanenbaum, known under his stage name Uncle Moishy, is an American Jewish children's entertainer. He performs educational songs with his band, Uncle Moishy and the Mitzvah Men, both on albums and in concerts around the world. These songs focus on the joy of living a Jewish life and performing mitzvos.

== Early life ==
Milton Tanenbaum was born in Toronto, Canada, to Sam and Rivka Tanenbaum, both Holocaust survivors. His parents owned a grocery store. He attended the Etz Chaim school, and was involved in choirs and youth groups. He started using the title Uncle in 1967 when his rabbi started referring to him as Uncle Milty, referencing the comedian Milton Berle who went by the same nickname. Later, in 1975, following the advice of the Lubavitcher Rebbe to use his Jewish name publicly, he adopted the stage name Uncle Moishy, which was suggested by a local Chabad shliach Yehoshua Laufer.

== Musical career ==
Tanenbaum initially performed for teens in 1975 with his friends Zale Newman and Chaim Shainhouse (though Shainhouse left the group early on), with Tanenbaum always wearing a black fedora with an oversized Hebrew letter Mem on it. Their music emphasized the joy of Jewish life, with songs covering themes like giving charity, studying Torah, and respecting parents. Some songs, such as "Shake It Up, Zaidy" and "Hey Dum Diddley Dum", were based on popular secular tunes. After a successful performance for preschoolers, the group began focusing on younger audiences.

In 1979, they released their first album in conjunction with the Jewish Education Program, produced by Suki and Ding. It included songs such as "Hashem Is Here", "Torah Tzivah Lanu", "Ain't Gonna Work on Saturday", "Don't Walk in Front of Me", and "Give a Little Tzedakah". Their first concert was held in 1982 at the Franklin Delano Roosevelt High School. They continued to perform at locations around Canada and the United States, then around the world, giving shows in Israel, England, Austria, South Africa, and Hong Kong. Tanenbaum was especially popular in the 1980s and 1990s due to the limited number of other Jewish entertainers at the time. He produced his first video, also with Suki and Ding, in 1990. Over the years, he and Suki and Ding produced a total of 22 albums and 14 videos together.

=== Dispute ===
A dispute arose in 2016 between Tanenbaum and Suki and Ding over a rise in royalty fees. Tanenbaum claimed that he personified the character of Uncle Moishy, while David Golding of Suki and Ding argued that his production company held the intellectual property rights to the brand, including the songs, albums, and live performances. Following the disagreement, Tanenbaum left the company and began working with Sonic Duo Productions, which launched the Uncle Moishy's World brand. In response, Suki and Ding hired a new performer, Yossi Berktin, to continue the character. A religious court, the Machon Le'Hora'ah beth din, ruled in October 2017 that Suki and Ding owned the rights to the music and songs, but that both parties were permitted to use the name Uncle Moishy.

Tanenbaum later released a new book, published by ArtScroll, together with a music album produced by Doni Gross.

== Discography ==
=== Albums ===
- Uncle Moishy Volume 1
- Uncle Moishy Volume 2
- Uncle Moishy Volume 3
- Uncle Moishy Volume 4
- Uncle Moishy Volume 5
- Uncle Moishy Volume 6
- Uncle Moishy Volume 7
- Uncle Moishy Volume 8
- Uncle Moishy Volume 9
- Uncle Moishy Volume 10
- Uncle Moishy Volume 11
- Uncle Moishy Volume 12
- Uncle Moishy Volume 13
- Uncle Moishy Volume 14
- Uncle Moishy Volume 15
- Uncle Moishy Volume 16
- Uncle Moishy Volume 17
- Uncle Moishy Volume 18
- Uncle Moishy Volume 19
- The Very Best of Uncle Moishy
- Uncle Moishy Live
- Uncle Moishy: My Siddur
- Uncle Moishy: Mezzuzah
- Uncle Moishy: Let's Bounce!
- Uncle Moishy: Favorite Lullabies
- Uncle Moishy: Good Shabbos
- Uncle Moishy Sings Jewish Holiday Favorites
- Uncle Moishy: Chanukah
- Pesach with Uncle Moishy
- Uncle Moishy Visits Torah Island
- Welcome!
- We Are So Special! (2021)
- Feel the Simcha in the Air (2021)
- Pesach with Friends and Family (2022)
- The Friendship Album (2026)

=== DVDs ===
- Uncle Moishy Volume 1
- Uncle Moishy Volume 2
- Uncle Moishy Volume 3
- Uncle Moishy Volume 4
- Uncle Moishy Volume 5
- Uncle Moishy Volume 6
- Uncle Moishy Volume 7
- Uncle Moishy Volume 8
- Uncle Moishy Volume 9
- Uncle Moishy Volume 10
- Uncle Moishy Volume 11
- Uncle Moishy Volume 12
- Uncle Moishy Volume 13
- Uncle Moishy Volume 14
- Uncle Moishy: Jewish Holiday Songs
- Pesach with Uncle Moishy
- Uncle Moishy: Succos
- Uncle Moishy: Chanukah
- Uncle Moishy and Hello-Bello Show
- Uncle Moishy's World

=== Books ===
- The Very Best Shabbos Guest (2021, ArtScroll, written by Libby Lazenwik and Perry Binet)
- The Very Best Chanukah Guest (2021, ArtScroll, written by Libby Lazenwik and Perry Binet)
- The Very Best Pesach Surprise (2022, ArtScroll, written by Libby Lazenwik and Perry Binet)
- Uncle Moishy and The New Neighbours (2026, ArtScroll, written by Ruchie Torgow)
