= Julie Silver =

American folk musician

- Origin: Massachusetts, United States
- Genre: Singer-songwriter
- Years active: 1991–present
- Label: Independent

Julie Silver is an American folk musician who has been traveling throughout the world and performing for the last 20 years. She has released eight albums which have sold over 80,000 copies without the help of a major label.

== Early life ==
Silver was raised in Newton, Massachusetts and started playing music at the age of eight. Her music is predominantly Jewish in nature, and she sings in both Hebrew and English. She performs original songs that are written by her, as well as traditional Jewish folk songs by others.

== Career ==
Her music has been featured in several Jewish songbooks, such as R'fuah Sh'leimah: Songs of Jewish Healing.

Silver also has had an acting role, appearing in Then She Found Me in a scene opposite Bette Midler.

== Personal life ==
She currently lives in Los Angeles with her wife, Mary Connelly (Executive Producer of The Ellen DeGeneres Show), and their two daughters, Sarah and Catherine, in Southern California.

== Discography ==
- Reunion (2009)
- It's Chanukah Time (2007) (a CD of Jewish holiday music, the first of this genre to be produced exclusively for the Barnes & Noble bookstore chain) and produced by Tor Hyams.
- For Love to Grow (2005) (a Parents' Choice Award Blue Ribbon Recommended work)
- Notes From Montana (2002)
- Beyond Tomorrow (1998)
- Walk With Me (1994)
- From Strength to Strength (1993)
- Together (1992)
