= Abie Rotenberg =

Orthodox Jewish musician

- Born: Avraham Yom Tov Rotenberg; Queens
- Education: Eitz Chaim Schools
- Occupations: musician; composer; entertainer
- Years active: 1970–present

Abie Rotenberg (Hebrew: אברהם יום טוב רוטנברג) is a prolific Orthodox Jewish musician, composer and entertainer from Toronto, Ontario, Canada.

Rotenberg grew up in Queens, New York, surrounded by other up and coming religious Jewish musicians, including Eli Teitelbaum, who directed the first Pirchei boys choir, as well as Rabbi Baruch Chait and Label Sharfman who attended yeshiva with him. Rotenberg studied piano and taught himself guitar at a young age.

== Musical career ==
Rotenberg has cited the musicians Rabbi Ben Zion Shenker and Rabbi Shlomo Carlebach as strong influences. While his folk-inspired sound and inspirational lyrics are strongly reminiscent of Carlebach, Rotenberg's soft and sometimes melancholic voice, however, contrasts with Carlebach's ecstatic style. Rotenberg has collaborated with other Jewish musicians including Mordechai ben David, Avraham Fried, Yehuda Schechter, Yaakov Shwekey, Baruch Levine, Moshe Yess and Shlomo Simcha with whom he co-starred in Israel National Radio's Miracles 18 concert.

Rotenberg has also been a main fixture of the annual HASC A Time for Music concerts. He has produced a children's audio series called the Marvelous Midos Machine comprising four volumes, with all original material. Rotenberg said that wanted to raise awareness of different traits inherent in each child through this series. He also produced the children's audio CDs The Golden Crown and The Lost Treasure.

== Writing career ==
In September 2015, Rotenberg published his first novel, The Season of Pepsi Meyers, a book about an 18-year old Jewish boy playing for the New York Yankees, set in the future (Audley Street Books).

In November 2016, Rotenberg released Eliyahu Hanavi, under his full name Avraham Yom Tov Rotenberg, an in-depth analysis of the life of Elijah the Prophet (Mesorah Publications).

In September 2024, he released Rabbi Akiva, an in-depth study of Rabbi Akiva, also published by Mesorah.

== Discography ==
- Clei Zemer - Ki Lecho Tov Lehodos (Composer and Vocalist) (1971)
- D'veykus: Volumes 1-6 (1973, 1975, 1981, 1990, 1995, 2001)
- Shlomo Carlebach & the Children of Jewish Song sing Ani Maamin (Vocal Arranger) (1975)
- Kol Salonika - Songs of Shabbos (1977)
- Achva (1985)
- Journeys: Volumes 1-5 (1984, 1989, 1992, 2003, 2022)
- The Marvelous Midos Machine: Volumes 1-4 (1986, 1987, 1988, 2011)
- A Time to Laugh (1988)
- The Golden Crown (1989)
- Lev V'Nefesh: Volumes 1-2 (1990, 1998)
- Aish: Volumes 1-3 (with Shlomo Simcha) (1997, 2003, 2020)
- The Lost Treasure (2015)
- Butterfly (with Shulem Lemmer) (Single, 2023)
- The Neshama Lives Forever (with Joey Newcomb) (Single, 2024)
