= Oorah (organization) =

Tax exempt Jewish organization

Oorah, Inc.
- Founder: Chaim Mintz
- Type: 501(c)(3) organization
- Tax ID no.: 22-3746051
- Website: www.oorah.org

Oorah Kiruv Rechokim, Inc (Hebrew: עורה קירוב רחוקים; "awaken and bring in those who are far"), better known as Oorah, is an incorporated Orthodox Jewish outreach (kiruv) organization. It is a United States–based 501(c)(3) non-profit organization. It is best known for the operation of its sister organization, Kars4Kids.

== History ==
Oorah, Inc. was founded by Chaim Mintz and is based in Lakewood, New Jersey. His son, Eliyahu Mintz, is CEO.

== Programs ==
Oorah operates and/or funds 49 individual programs that target Jewish outreach (kiruv) and learning, family support, personal growth, and relationship counseling. It promotes family support and development. It runs summer camps for boys and girls; Jewish holiday enrichment; early, primary, and secondary educational support and enrichment. One of their main programs involves an anthropomorphic $5 bill, named Fiveish.

== Legal issues and hacks ==
In the summer of 2007, 31 undocumented immigrants doing work for a subcontractor at Oorah's summer camp in Gilboa, New York were arrested in a raid by Immigration and Customs Enforcement (ICE) and local law enforcement. Camp director Eliyohu Mintz stated that the organization was not aware that the workers lacked employment authorization.

In 2007, Oorah entered an agreement with Young Israel of Eltingville Synagogue, in which Oorah would pay $250,000 for the building, while allowing the synagogue congregation to continue to hold services there. The congregation later challenged the agreement. In 2013, a beth din (religious court) ruled that the synagogue owed Oorah $1 million. The 2007 agreement stipulated that Rabbi Chaim Mintz, founder of Oorah and father of Oorah CEO Eliyohu Mintz, would arbitrate any dispute between the two parties; the 2013 court decision listed Mintz as one of the judges on the beth din. Young Israel of Eltingville sued to vacate the arbitration award, which could have led to the closure of the synagogue and relinquished its assets to Oorah. In 2017, the Supreme Court of the State of New York vacated the award, ruling that the synagogue representative who made the 2007 agreement was not authorized to do so.

In September 2010, the website for Oorah's sleep-away camps for children was hacked.

In 2017, a report from the attorney general of Minnesota, Lori Swanson, stated that Kars4Kids, a vehicle donation charity and sister organization to Oorah, had misled donors in Minnesota regarding the use of their funds and had failed to properly disclose their religious affiliation. Of the $3 million raised by Kars4Kids in Minnesota, less than $12,000 went to children in Minnesota, while 90% of the funds went to Oorah, which is based in New Jersey and operates summer camps in New York. The report also stated that Oorah had lost almost $10 million in real estate transactions. Kars4Kids and Oorah share offices in Lakewood, New Jersey, and have many employees working for both charities. The attorney general's office found that the majority of Oorah's funds came from grants from Kars4Kids.

In May 2026, an Orange County, California Superior Court judge found that Kars4Kids' advertisements had violated laws against deceptive advertising by not disclosing that their primary purpose is to fund Oorah, amongst other issues.
