= Velvel Pasternak =

Canadian musicologist (1933–2019)

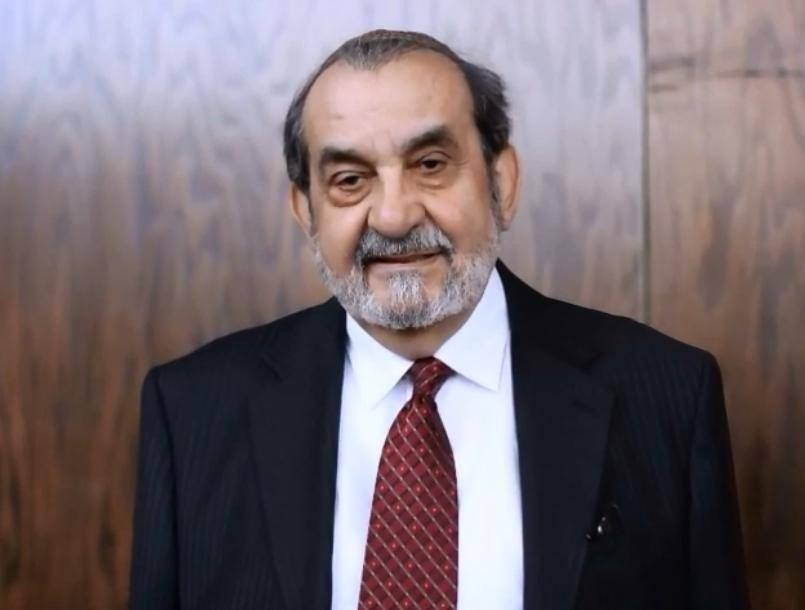
- Velvel Pasternak in 2011
- Born: October 1, 1933 Toronto, Ontario, Canada
- Died: June 11, 2019 (aged 85) Oceanside, NY, U.S.

Velvel Pasternak (October 1, 1933 – June 11, 2019) was a musicologist, conductor, arranger, producer, and publisher specializing in Jewish music. In 1981, the New York Times described him as "an expert on the music of the Hasidic sect and probably the largest publisher of Jewish music anywhere, although he was quick to note that publishing Jewish music is a business that attracts few rivals."

== Biography ==
Velvel Pasternak was born in Toronto in 1933 to immigrant parents from Poland. He received an Orthodox Jewish education and was a graduate of Yeshiva University High School for Boys (class of 1951) and of Yeshiva University (class of 1955). He also studied at the Juilliard School, and received a master's in music education from Teachers College, Columbia University.

The founder of Tara Publications, he was responsible for the publication of 26 recordings and over 150 books of Jewish music since 1971, spanning the gamut of Israeli, Yiddish, Ladino, cantorial, Hasidic and Holocaust music. He was a regular lecturer on the music of the Hassidim. He was the music teacher at the Congregation Sons of Israel synagogue in Woodmere, NY for many years. He died on June 11, 2019, in New York City.

== Published works ==
- Songs of the Chassidim (1970, ISBN 9780000000934)
- Songs of the Chassidim II (1971, ISBN 9780819702760)
- The Best of Israeli Folk Dances (1997, ISBN 978-0-933676-20-6) (previous edition 1990)
- The Jewish Fake Book (1997, ISBN 978-0-933676-69-5)
- Z'Mirot and Kumzitz Songbook (1997, ISBN 9780933676633)
- Beyond Hava Nagila (1999, ISBN 978-0-933676-78-7)
- The Jewish Music Companion (2003, ISBN 978-1-928918-24-0)
- Songs Never Silenced--The Folk Music And Poetry of the Shoah (2003, ISBN 978-1-928918-26-4) (with Shmerke Kaczerginsky)
- The Best of Hasidic Song: Selections from 7 Acclaimed Music Books (2012, ISBN 9781928918868)
- The Big Jewish Songbook (2014, ISBN 9781495012013)
- Shlomo Carlebach Anthology: Compiled, Edited and Arranged by Velvel Pasternak (2016, ISBN 9780933676336)
- Behind the Music, Stories, Anecdotes, Articles and Reflections (2017, ISBN 9781928918523)

== See also ==
- Jewish music
