= Jewish prenuptial agreement =

Prenuptial agreement utilized within the Jewish religious

The Jewish prenuptial agreement has been developed in recent times with the stated intent of keeping the Jewish woman from becoming an agunah in cases where the husband refuses to grant her a get (Jewish divorce document). Without such an agreement, Jewish marriages cannot be dissolved without the consent and cooperation of both spouses. This new type of prenuptial agreement makes provisions for the possibility of divorce. By setting up rules prior to the marriage in the form of a contract, both spouses have an interest to negotiate a divorce in a dignified manner, and get-refusal is avoided.

== Halakhic background ==
Halakha (Jewish law) states that in order for a Jewish divorce to be valid, the husband must place a get (Jewish divorce document) in his wife's hands out of his own free will (Yebamot, 14:1). If he does not have the intent to divorce his wife, no other party—person or court, can do so in his stead. A Jewish woman chained to her marriage because of her husband's inability to grant her a get, is referred to as a mesorevet get. As of late, common usage has applied the term agunah to include a victim of get-refusal as well.

When discussing the agunah problem, a distinction must be drawn between the classic definition of an agunah and a victim of get-refusal. Halakhically, an agunah is a woman whose husband has disappeared and it is not known whether he is alive or dead. The example used is the passenger on a boat that sank in “waters that have no end” (Babylonian Talmud, Yevamot, chapter 10). The case of the classic agunah still possibly exists today: The wives of several men who were killed on 9/11 potentially could have been declared agunot; however, with the combined international legal efforts of several prominent Orthodox rabbis, all these cases were resolved and the women were permitted to remarry. A more prevalent problem is that of a husband who is alive and well, but refuses to give his wife a get. A woman in these circumstances is called a mesorevet get - a woman who is refused a get.

== Historical background ==
The problem of get-refusal became more widespread when Jews lived in countries where civil divorce was available, separate from religious divorce. The earliest prenuptial agreement for the prevention of get-refusal was developed and accepted by the Rabbinical Council of Morocco on December 16, 1953 ("Sefer Hatakanot", Vol. 1, The Institute for Moroccan Jewish Tradition, Jerusalem). The prenuptial agreement gained further approbation in 1981 from Chalom Messas, chief rabbi of Jerusalem ("Sefer Tevuot Shemesh", Jerusalem 1981). Following Messas' involvement, the Rabbinical Council of America actively pursued this issue (“The RCA Commission: Solving the Problem of Gittin", Hamevaser, Vol. 22 No. 2, October 27, 1983). The latest in a series of RCA resolutions -- "that since there is a significant agunah problem in America and throughout the Jewish world, no rabbi should officiate at a wedding where a proper prenuptial agreement on get has not been executed”—was passed on May 18, 2006.

== Prenuptial agreement as preventive solution ==
In the United States, the most prominent prenuptial agreement for the prevention of get-refusal signed within the Orthodox Jewish community is the agreement of the Beth Din of America. It is a “binding arbitration agreement.” The Beth Din, accepted by both bride and groom as an arbitration panel, is legally enabled to render a binding decision in all issues relating to a get. This ensures that all adjudication leading up to the administration of a get is done according to Orthodox halakha, by Rabbinical Judges. The clauses of the prenuptial agreement delineate the rules accepted by the signatories, according to which the Rabbinical Court should rule. There are optional clauses authorizing the court to rule on monetary matters or child custody and related issues. The entire agreement is in keeping with the law of the State where it is signed and can be enforced as a binding arbitration agreement in the State Court.

The heart of the prenuptial agreement is the monetary obligation undertaken by the groom. He obligates himself to support his wife at a particular rate (from the point of separation) as long as they are married according to Jewish law, if the Beth Din renders a decision enforcing this obligation. In essence this means that from the point that his wife asks for a get and the Beth Din recommends that he deliver the get, until he gives the get, the husband is obligated "to support my Wife-to-Be from the date that our domestic residence together shall cease for whatever reasons, at the rate of … in lieu of my Jewish law obligation of support so long as the two of us remain married according to Jewish law…."

Aryeh Klapper attests: "A wide variety of prenuptial agreements have been proposed. Each had its halakhic proponents and detractors, but for better or worse none gained the kind of widespread support necessary for effectiveness until seven years ago. At that time, a mechanism originally suggested by Rabbi J. David Bleich and developed by Rabbi Mordekhai Willig gained overwhelming halakhic approval throughout the Orthodox rabbinate. Rabbinical organizations such as the RCA and Young Israel, and lay organizations such as the Orthodox Caucus and the Wedding Resource Center, then began the continuing effort to make signing this agreement universal practice. This effort is meeting with growing success. The number of couples signing the agreements is growing dramatically, as is the number of rabbis strongly recommending it, or even refusing to officiate without it, in prenuptial meetings."

The director of the Beth Din of America, Yona Reiss, has repeatedly stated in public arenas (orally and weekly in The Jewish Press newspaper) that to his knowledge, the "prenuptial agreement is one hundred percent effective. In every case of a couple that had previously signed a prenuptial agreement and later came to divorce, there was a get delivered in a timely fashion." Australian Chabad rabbi Moshe Gutnick has spoken out strongly in favor of them.

The Organization for the Resolution of Agunot began its Agunah Prevention Initiative to educate the North American Jewish community about the importance of standardizing the use of the prenuptial agreement to prevent situations of get-refusal. In November 2014, they released a video to promote the message that "friends don't let friends get married without the prenup."

There are additional prenuptial agreements for the prevention of get-refusal which have been signed in the United States. Moshe Tendler offers an alternate version.

Conservative Judaism has sought to prevent cases of get-refusal by attaching a clause to the ketubah (marriage contract), as opposed to a separate prenuptial agreement, known as the Lieberman clause: The parties agree that if there are civil divorce proceedings, then both must appear before a beth din (rabbinical court) of the Rabbinical Assembly and of the Jewish Theological Seminary of America. Saul Lieberman, a professor at the Jewish Theological Seminary, proposed that the clause be added to the ketubah to create a legal remedy through civil courts in case one party fails to cooperate in Jewish divorce proceedings. The Women's League of Conservative Judaism officially endorsed the use of the Lieberman clause in combination with a prenuptial agreement in 2008. In practice, women have been successful in getting courts to enforce the "Lieberman Clause", though not always the ketubah itself, in U.S. state courts, including the highest court of the state of New York, though continuing questions about the legal validity of the document have led the Conservative Rabbinical Assembly to encourage the signing of a letter of intent together with the clause.

== Heskem L’Kavod Hadadi ==
A different agreement developed in Israel in Hebrew, called the Heskem L’Kavod Hadadi (the Agreement for Mutual Respect) was authored by a team of two rabbis and a rabbinical court advocate — David Ben Zazon, Elyashiv Knohl and Rachel Levmore — in consultation with experts in various fields (Jewish law, Rabbinic courts, family law, women's organizations, psychology). This particular agreement is recommended by concerned organizations, rabbinic as well as feminist, including the director of the Israeli rabbinical courts, Eli Ben-Dahan. The prenuptial agreement essentially works on a similar principle of spousal support in the case of recalcitrance as that of the Beth Din of America. However, in the Agreement for Mutual Respect the obligation is mutual. Both the bride and the groom obligate themselves to support his or her spouse, the amount ranging from $1500 per month to half his/her monthly net income. The obligation is activated after notification followed by a defined waiting period, if the couple is still married according to halakha. If a spouse is willing to give/accept a get unconditionally at that point, his/her obligation is voided. In this manner only the recalcitrant spouse's obligation will remain in effect. Obviously, if a get were administered during the waiting period, neither spouse is obligated to the other. There are additional matters covered by this agreement, such as: If one of the spouses demands marital therapy, the other must comply up to three visits; the community property law of the State of Israel is accepted as halakha for those that sign the agreement.

The Council of Young Israel Rabbis in Israel, in cooperation with Yonah Reiss and Michael Broyde, both of the Beth Din of America, translated the Agreement for Mutual Respect into English. A clause is included which assigns jurisdiction to the Beth Din of America in the case where the Agreement for Mutual Respect itself would prove to be unenforceable for any reason in the State of Israel or "in the jurisdiction that the parties reside in at the time that either one of them seeks enforcement of its provisions". Under those circumstances the Agreement for Mutual Respect converts into a binding arbitration agreement with the Beth Din of America assigned as the arbiter. This same agreement has been translated from the original Hebrew also into French, Spanish. and Russian.

In the United Kingdom, the London Beth Din offers a prenuptial agreement which is in essence a generic arbitration agreement appointing the London Beth Din as arbiter "in the event of any matrimonial dispute, they will both attend the Court of the Chief Rabbi, the London Beth Din … when required to do so and that they will comply with the instructions of that Beth Din, including co-operation in any mediation recommended, in seeking to resolve all problems arising out of or in connection with their Jewish marriage." A more detailed agreement, based on the Israeli "Agreement for Mutual Respect", which was adapted to the specifics of British family law was drawn up by Rachel Levmore with British barrister Daniel Clarke, called "The Prenuptial Agreement for Mutual Respect (PAMR) for use in England".

== Rabbinic debate ==
Some rabbis have expressed halakhic reservations with the Jewish prenuptial agreement.

On May 4, 2015, Sholom Shuchat delivered a speech decrying the use of the prenup, explaining why it may disqualify any get obtained as a result of it.

On August 2, 2015, Moshe Sternbuch announced that the Beth Din of America prenuptial agreement results in potentially disqualified gittin. Others have objected to the Heskem L’Kavod Hadadi.
