= Agunah =

Woman who is stuck in her marriage according to Jewish law

An aguna or agunah (Hebrew: עֲגוּנָה, romanized: ʿaḡunā, lit. 'anchored or chained [woman]'; pl. עֲגוּנוֹת, ʿaḡunoṯ) is a Jewish woman who is stuck in her marriage as determined by traditional Halakha (Jewish law). The classic case is a man who has left on a journey and has not returned or has gone into battle and is missing in action. It is used as a borrowed term to refer to a woman whose husband refuses or is unable to grant her a divorce (which requires a document known as a get). However, it is also possible for a man to also have the status of an agunah (referred to as an agun (masculine form of the word), although these are a minority of cases.

For a divorce to be effective, Halakha requires a man to grant his wife a get of his own free will. Without a get, no new marriage will be recognized, and any child she might have with another man would be considered a mamzer (illegitimate). It is sometimes possible for a woman to receive special dispensation from a posek (halakhic authority), called a heter agunah, based on a complex decision supported by substantial evidence that her husband is presumed dead, but this cannot be applied if the husband is alive.

Because of the difficulty for women in such situations, it has been a task for every generation of halakhic authorities to try to find halakhically acceptable means to permit such women to remarry. In the past, it was not uncommon, due to the danger of travel and primitive means of communication, for people to leave home and never be heard from again; consequently, rabbis often had to deal with this issue. Over the past few centuries, thousands of responsa have been written to deal with cases of agunot.

In the past, most agunah cases were due to a husband dying without leaving evidence of his demise or becoming mentally ill. Many agunah cases arise from a husband withholding a get, perhaps seeking a more favorable divorce settlement or out of vindictiveness. In response agunah groups have organized to support these women and try to find a solution to this problem. Various remedies have been proposed, but no one solution has common acceptance. Nevertheless, the Jewish prenuptial agreement is one remedy in use in Modern Orthodox Judaism and is accepted by moderate halakhic authorities.

== Jewish law ==
=== Causes ===
Circumstances leading to a woman being declared an agunah are:

- The disappearance of the husband without any witnesses declaring that he is dead;
- The husband succumbing to a physical or mental disease that leaves him in a coma or insane and unable actively to grant a divorce;
- The husband refusing to grant his wife a get when she is deemed entitled to one under Jewish law. A woman denied a get by her husband is technically called a mesorevet get, although the term agunah is more commonly used.

A woman who is denied a divorce from her husband is not considered an agunah until her husband refuses an order by a beth din (rabbinic court) to give her a get.

What constitutes a legitimate request for a divorce is based on halakhic considerations and the particular case of the couple. See Mesorevet get below.

In modern and ancient times, warfare has been a major cause of women being declared agunot (plural of agunah), as (especially in ancient times) soldiers are often killed with no one knowing. Many efforts have been made to resolve this problem following halakhic principles, including issuing a provisional get that only goes into effect if the husband does not return by a specified date. During World War II, some American Jewish and other chaplains provided combat soldiers with a "provisional get", which only goes into effect if the husband is missing in action, leaving his wife an agunah. This practice is based on the Talmudic declaration that King David did not commit adultery when lying with Bathsheba (see II Samuel 11), since all of his soldiers (including Bathsheba's husband) gave a "provisional get" to their wives before leaving for battle. This practice can raise halakhic issues, especially for Kohanim (members of the priestly class). Since they are forbidden from marrying divorcees, were they to end up returning safely after the date the provisional get went into effect they would be unable to remarry their wives.

=== Ways to resolve an agunah case ===
Because of the serious nature of adultery in Jewish law, an agunah is forbidden to marry another man, regardless of the circumstances, whether accidental or malicious, that left her an agunah in the first place, or the amount of time that has passed since she first became an agunah. A child born from another man to an agunah is considered a safek mamzer (illegitimate), and may only marry a convert.

Because of the dire situation of the agunah, every effort is made to release her from her marriage. This can be done in three ways:

- Locating the husband and persuading him to give his wife a get;
- Providing evidence that the husband is dead;
- Finding a flaw in the original marriage ceremony, thereby retroactively annulling the marriage.

According to most rabbis, reasonable circumstantial evidence is sufficient to prove the death of the husband, and no direct testimony is required. This is based, among other things, on the talmudic assertion: "The Rabbis taught: 'If he fell into a lion's den, [bring witnesses to] testify [that he is dead], if he fell into a ditch of snakes and scorpions—[there is] no [need] to testify [that he is dead]'". In other words, if it is known that the man fell into a ditch of snakes and scorpions and did not come out, it can be assumed that he is dead, and there is no need for further evidence (unlike falling into a lion's den where there is still a slight chance of survival). If, however, it is later discovered that the husband is not dead, the woman will find herself in particularly bad circumstances: her children from her second marriage will be considered mamzerim, and she will be forced to divorce both her first and second husbands, subject to the halakhic ruling that an adulterous woman "is forbidden to her husband and the man with whom she fornicated". While such situations are extremely rare under normal circumstances, they did occur in the aftermath of the Holocaust and also occurred frequently in the wake of pogroms and other forms of persecution.

Finding a flaw in the marriage ceremony is considered to be a last resort in releasing an agunah. It is rarely used as it is typically difficult to find actual cause in most marriages sufficient to invalidate them retroactively. In Jewish law, a marriage must be performed in front of two witnesses. In order to release the agunah, efforts are made to identify reasons why one of the witnesses was ineligible. This is typically unachievable as strong efforts are made at the time of marriage to ensure the validity of the witnesses and the marriage ceremony. Another possibility is to prove that the woman did not consent to the marriage clearly and of her own free will, so that the marriage ceremony is declared invalid. This too is not generally accepted amongst the halakhic authorities as there is generally no method to disprove intent. It is felt that the purpose of this endeavor is solely or primarily to retroactively delegitimize a marriage that was performed and accepted often many years previously. Annulling the marriage has no impact on the status of the woman's children. However, since it is not a generally accepted mechanism, it may leave the wife susceptible to a halakhic ruling that she was still married, and any subsequent relations with another man to be adultery. And it may lead to other halakhic problems, so it is only used as a last resort by the authorities that do accept its use.

=== Conservative Judaism ===
At the 1998 Jerusalem "Agunot Conference", Mayer Rabinowitz, the Chairman of the Joint Bet Din of the Conservative Movement, explained the four approaches taken by leaders of Conservative Judaism to find remedies for the problem of the agunah.

The first, beginning in the 1950s, was the inclusion of the Lieberman clause in the ketubah (marriage contract). Named for Talmudic scholar and Jewish Theological Seminary (JTS) professor Saul Lieberman, the clause requires that a get be granted if a civil divorce is ever issued. While most Orthodox rabbis have rejected the Lieberman clause, leaders of the Conservative movement claim that the original intent was to find a solution that could be used by Orthodox and Conservative rabbis alike, and that leaders of Orthodox Judaism's Rabbinical Council of America, and respected Orthodox rabbis, including Joseph B. Soloveitchik, supposedly recognized the clause as valid. Later, because some civil courts viewed the enforcement of a religious document as a violation of the constitutional principle of the separation of church and state, Conservative rabbis began to require couples to sign a separate letter, stating that the clause had been explained to them as part of pre-marital counseling, and that both parties understood and agreed to its conditions, recognizing that this letter would constitute a separate civil document, enforceable in a civil court. However, many Conservative rabbis, including some on the movement's own law committee, had growing misgivings about the clause for religious reasons.

The second approach fell into the category of conditional marriages, t'nai b'kiddushin, and was based in part on past approaches used by both the French and Turkish rabbinates—but, according to Rabinowitz—had improvements gleaned from lessons learned from those past experiences. The ketubah was not changed, but a separate pre-marital agreement was signed, and in the presence of the rabbinical court, the prospective groom read it, and the prospective bride stated that she agreed to it. The agreement was that the parties understood that if a civil divorce were ever granted, then a get must be delivered within six months of that date. A refusal to abide by that agreement would give the court no choice but to consider the original marriage, and the original declaration of the groom, so flawed that it would be as if that marriage never occurred.

The third approach, using contacts both within Judaism and external to it, was to coerce the recalcitrant husband to grant a get. One example cited at the conference was a case where the civilly-divorced husband planned to remarry, this time to a Catholic woman in a Catholic religious ceremony. The Conservative movement's Bet Din contacted the Catholic Church, which agreed to refuse to have the marriage performed until the previous marriage was religiously dissolved, resulting in the almost immediate granting of the get by the husband.

Finally, in 1968, by a unanimous vote of the law committee, the final approach was initiated, when it was decided that the Joint Bet Din of the Conservative Movement could annul marriages as a last resort, based on the Talmudic principle of hafka'at kiddushin. According to Rabinowitz, just the threat of this action was sometimes enough to compel the former husband to grant a get.

=== Changes in Orthodox approach ===
There is a long history of concern for the agunah on the part of Orthodox rabbis, and a number of proposals have been put forth for consideration by religious leaders. So far, no solution has been found that satisfies most orthodox religious leaders.

A number of modern papers and conferences have continued to discuss both issues and possible solutions, including the possibility of a modern takkanah (religious legislative enaction), to empower the Chief Rabbinate of Israel to intervene to annul marriages retroactively, in a way that was possible for some time during the Middle Ages. Such proposals are considered too radical—and not halakhically permissible—by most orthodox leaders.

However, as studies and discussions continue, a number of modern works and conferences have referenced the work of past Orthodox rabbis, such as Ya'akov Moshe Toledano, who recommended in 1930/31 that every Jewish marriage be made contingent on the "continuing agreement" of the local rabbinic court, so that the court could retroactively annul the marriage as a remedy to the agunah problem; and Mnachem Risikoff, who recommended in 1937 that such consideration be given not to every local court, but at least to the Jerusalem rabbinical court, specifically recognizing that authority in the words recited under the chuppah (wedding canopy). Risikoff, among others, also proposed a discussion of the reinstatement of the Biblical status of the pilegesh, a relationship status between man and woman that does not require a get upon dissolution, thereby avoiding the category of agunah.

Other approaches that have been discussed by religious leaders, including leading Orthodox rabbis, have included the possibility of prenuptial agreements, not incorporated into the ketubah or mentioned in the words recited by the groom during the ceremony, through which the husband and wife agree to abide by orders of a designated Beth Din, regarding the giving or acceptance of a get. Jechiel Perr discussed such a proposal, and it has been reported that Moshe Feinstein, looked upon this idea with favor, and Australian Chabad rabbi Moshe Gutnick has spoken out strongly in favor of it. Additionally, discussions have considered the possibility of various forms of coercion that could be applied to the husband, to compel him to grant the get.

No proposal has so far met with wide approval on the part of the Orthodox rabbinate, although there have been some cases of individual rabbis taking what has been viewed as "maverick" individual action, including the convening of rabbinic courts to annul marriages, using the Geonic model. Such actions have been widely condemned within the orthodox community.

In 2012 the International Rabbinic Fellowship (IRF), an organization of (as of 2012) 150 Modern Orthodox rabbis, passed a resolution saying that, "IRF Rabbis may not officiate at a wedding unless the couple has signed a halakhic prenuptial agreement. IRF rabbis are further encouraged to participate ritually only in weddings in which the couple has signed a halakhic prenuptial agreement. Ritual participation includes but is not limited to reading the ketubah, serving as a witness, and making one of the sheva berachot". By 2019, the vast majority of Modern Orthodox rabbis took the same approach.

=== Zika le-Yibbum ===
A related case is that of a woman whose husband has died childless: in such a situation, the husband's brother is required by Jewish law to enter into yibbum (a kind of levirate marriage) with the widow so as to have children with her in the name of the deceased. The brother can refuse to do yibbum and instead perform a ceremony known as halizah to release her from her bond to him (in modern times halizah is nearly always performed instead of yibbum). If the brother is missing, or if he is still a child, the woman is required to wait until he is located or has reached adolescence so that he can perform the halizah ceremony. There have been recorded cases of the husband's brother trying to blackmail the widow by delaying the halizah ceremony, effectively leaving her as an agunah.

== In Israel ==
In 1947 David Ben-Gurion acceded that the authority in matters of marriage and divorce would be invested in the hands of the Chief Rabbinate of Israel, and an agreement was signed in recognition of this decision (among other matters). This agreement is known as the "status quo letter". In 1953 the Knesset enacted the Rabbinical Courts Jurisdiction (Marriage and Divorce) Law, 5713 – 1953. Section 1 of the Law states, "Matters of marriage and divorce of Jews in Israel, being citizens or residents of the State, shall be under the exclusive jurisdiction of the rabbinical courts." The substantive provision of section 2 of this Law further states: "Marriages and divorces of Jews shall be performed in Israel in accordance with Jewish religious law" (din torah).

In 2007 the Chief Rabbinate found that in Israel men and women were refused divorce in equal numbers, 180 women and 185 men over a two-year period. The Director-General of the Rabbinical Courts, Eli Ben-Dahan, said this showed that "the claims by women's organizations of thousands of women whose husbands refuse to give them divorces have no basis in reality". Nevertheless, a woman has more of a disadvantage, as she is Biblically forbidden from marrying again if she lacks a get; if she does remarry, children she might bear to her new husband would be considered mamzerim according to halakha. While a man is technically not permitted to remarry before being divorced, the prohibition is much less severe; polygamy was banned by Gershom ben Judah as one single overreaching authority for Europe's Jews around the year 1000 CE, and was formally accepted among the Ashkenazim, whereas Sefardic and Mizrahi Jewish communities did not formally reject polygamy only until very recently, after aliyah to Israel in 1950's onward. In any case, a man's future children would not be considered illegitimate.

In 2015 Tzohar (a religious Zionist rabbinic organization in Israel), along with the Israeli Bar Association, introduced a prenuptial agreement meant to help ensure divorcing wives will receive a get; under the agreement the husband commits to paying a high sum of money daily to his spouse in the event of a separation.

In 2018 the Knesset passed a law, slated to remain in effect for three years, allowing Israel's rabbinical courts to handle certain cases of Jewish women wishing to divorce their Jewish husbands, even if neither the wife nor the husband is an Israeli citizen. A Supreme Court ruling in late 2025 limited this jurisdiction to litigants who had a strong connection to the state of Israel.

== Mesorevet get (Get refusal) ==
A mesorevet get is a Jewish woman or man who is a victim of "get refusal", and is known as a modern-day agunah or agun. Although the majority of cases of agunah involve women, there are documented cases of men being refused a get.

=== Halakha (Jewish Law) ===
According to halakha, a get is only valid when it is given by a husband to his wife of his own free will. Even so, under certain circumstances such as intimate partner violence, certain kinds of pressure may be applied on a husband to force him to grant a divorce to his wife, although other opinions forbid this. Where a woman has proven one or more of a list of particular grounds for divorce, the beth din (rabbinical court) may apply pressure on the husband in these very rare situations. There are some halakhic decisors who would act accordingly in the cases of abuse or neglect. Nevertheless, not under all circumstances is a wife entitled to demand a divorce according to halakha. If a wife who is not halakhically entitled to a divorce does demand one, she may not be considered as a mesorevet get by a rabbinical court. However, not any woman who wants to leave an unwanted marriage but is refused by her husband, is considered to be a victim of get refusal. There are opinions that deem a woman's repugnance for her husband as acceptable halakhic grounds for coercion. But this opinion has been rejected from Jewish applicable law. And some even say that Maimonides never intended to force the husband but to allow the wife to leave the house. "It is said: In cases of granting a get to a woman, the man is forced until he says, 'I wish to do so'" in which cases: in cases where the husband is one cited in the Mishnah who it is allowed to coerce. Nevertheless, in almost all cases, it is required to leave the man to his own free will, lest the get be considered a "coerced divorce", which is halakhically invalid. As ruled by Rabbeinu Tam, pressures that can be exerted against the man include shunning, denying him communal benefits and honors, but only refrain from providing him goodness is authorized and this has to be done without telling him it is because of the get. Rabbeinu Tam himself said that excomunication invalidates the get. And nowadays even the shunnings of Rabbeinu Tam are considered as an excommunication and therefore invalidate the get.

=== United States ===
Starting in the mid-1980s, the New York divorce coercion gang employed violent tactics such as kidnapping, beating and torture to extort gittin and money from husbands in troubled marriages. They were arrested by the Federal Bureau of Investigation in 2013, and sentenced to prison. In 2016, another rabbinical team was arrested on suspicion of planning the contract killing of a husband in order to free his wife.

=== Israel ===
In Israel, the state rabbinical courts (Beit HaDin HaRabani), operating under the authority of the state Rabbinate, exercise exclusive jurisdiction over Jewish divorce, including its civil effects for couples married in accordance with Jewish law. In 1984, these courts were placed under the supervisory authority of the secular judiciary (Beit Mishpat), thereby enabling parties to appeal rabbinical court decisions before secular courts. In 1995, legislation was enacted obligating the rabbinical courts to take all measures within their legal authority to ensure the prompt granting of a get upon a wife’s request. To this end, the legislature conferred upon rabbinical courts a range of coercive enforcement powers, including the revocation of driving licenses, restrictions on international travel, limitations on banking activities, revocation of firearms permits, and fixed-term or indefinite imprisonment in cases of persistent refusal to grant a get.

Public statements by the Chief Rabbi of Israel, David Lau, indicate that such enforcement measures have included incarceration under stringent conditions, including placement in isolation or in cells with criminal offenders, as well as restrictions on access to kosher food and the performance of certain religious observances, such as the use of tefillin, tallit, or prayer from a siddur.

Since 2018, the High Court of Justice of Israel (Bagatz) has upheld the authority of rabbinical courts to adjudicate cases involving non-Israeli women. Practices that had previously been conducted on an informal basis by the Rabbinate’s agunot commando were thereby formalized. This development has been the subject of legal and academic debate, particularly with respect to its implications for jurisdictional boundaries, conflict of laws, and the sovereignty of foreign states.

=== Prenuptial Agreement for the Prevention of Get-Refusal ===
Prenuptial Agreement for the Prevention of Get-Refusal, have been put in place by women's rights organizations and progressive rabinical courts.

== Activism ==
Many women's groups assert that rabbinical courts fail to use all the measures at their disposal to force men to grant their wives a get, thereby allowing a vengeful husband to blackmail his wife for years. Public criticism of the courts, as well as demonstrations, have been attempted to influence particularly notorious cases.

Several solutions have been proposed to help women who are denied a get:

- Increasing the means available to the rabbinic courts to force husbands to grant their wives a get. In Israel, rabbinic courts can even imprison a husband until he acquiesces and grants a get to his wife. This is not, however, an option for rabbinic courts elsewhere, since they do not have the support of the state.
- Having couples sign a Jewish prenuptial agreement, which requires the husband to pay high spousal support to his wife if he denies her a get, so as to provide incentive to the couple not to delay the divorce. Halakhic authorities in the United States have validated particular prenuptial agreements for the prevention of get-refusal.
- Having couples prepare a "provisional get", which will only go into effect under certain predefined circumstances.
- Having couples agree to a "conditional marriage", which includes a stipulation in the marriage ceremony citing that under certain conditions (such as living apart for an extended period of time), the marriage itself would be nullified with no need for a get.

In 1995 the Israeli parliament gave the rabbinical court expanded legal power to sanction men who refuse to give their wives a get by suspending their driver's licenses, seizing their bank accounts, preventing travel abroad and even imprisoning those who do not comply with an order to grant a divorce; however, women's groups say the 1995 law is not very effective because the court uses sanctions in less than 2% of cases.

In 2004, Justice Menachem HaCohen of the Jerusalem Family Court offered new hope to agunot when he ruled that a man refusing his wife a get must pay her NIS 425,000 in punitive damages, because "[R]efusal to grant a get constitutes a severe infringement on her ability to lead a reasonable, normal life, and can be considered emotional abuse lasting several years." He noted that "[T]his is not another sanction against someone refusing to give a get, intended to speed up the process of granting a get, and this court is not involving itself in any future arrangements for the granting of a get, but rather, it is a direct response to the consequences that stem from not granting a get, and the right of the woman to receive punitive damages." This ruling stemmed from the Public Litigation Project initiated by the advocacy organization Center for Women's Justice as one of a number of successful lawsuits filed in Israeli civil courts claiming financial damages against recalcitrant husbands.

In 2007, the Rabbinical Courts Administration released a report concerning agunot in Israel. The report clarified that various categories of unresolved divorce cases existed and that only a small percentage of cases are deemed as receiving the status of agunah. The report stated that in 2006-07 there were 942 unresolved divorce cases, with 69 receiving the status of agunah. The report selected 346 of the total as a sample for analysis. Referring to a subset of the total cases, the report indicated that 180 cases involved husbands refusing a divorce while 190 cases involved the wife refusing a divorce.

Outside Israel, an agunah could obtain a civil divorce and remarry via civil marriage, as non-Israeli legal systems generally do not recognize the agunah status. Nevertheless, an agunah would not typically pursue a second marriage, since her first marriage is still valid according to halakha, any other sexual relationships would constitute adultery from her first husband. Furthermore, according to halakha, any children born by an agunah are considered mamzerim.

In 2014 the Rabbinate of Uruguay instituted the requirement for all Jewish couples that marry under its auspices to sign a rabbinic prenuptial agreement. The agreement states that in the case of the couple divorcing civilly, the husband is obligated to immediately deliver to his wife a get. The initiative was launched by Sara Winkowski, a director of the Kehila, the Comunidad Israelita del Uruguay (Jewish Community of Uruguay), who is also a Vice President of the World Jewish Congress and longtime activist for the rights of women within Jewish law.

In a 2020 landmark case in London, a woman obtained a get after launching a private criminal prosecution against her husband for "controlling and coercive behaviour in an intimate of family relationship" contrary to section 76 of the Serious Crime Act 2015. This was submitted on the basis that her husband had kept her in an intimate relationship against her will. The criminal prosecution was dropped when the husband relented and provided the get rather than face the prospect of a substantial prison sentence.

Subsequently, in 2022, another suit was successfully pursued resulting in a Manchester businessman pleading guilty to coercive behavior for refusing to give his wife a get. This case marks the first complete application of the 2015 legislative effort to prevent the situation of agunot.

In March 2024, Orthodox social media influencer Adina Sash (known online as Flatbush Girl) called for women in the Orthodox community to refrain from having sex with their husbands in order to draw attention to Malky Berkowitz's four-year-long effort to secure a get from an abusive husband. The "mikvah strike" (so named because Orthodox women must ritually purify themselves in a bath known as a mikvah before engaging in sexual relations) generated significant controversy within Orthodox communities around the world. Berkowitz received a get in September 2024.

=== Agunah Day ===
Agunah Day was established by ICAR—The International Coalition for Agunah Rights—in 1990, to raise public awareness to the plight of the Agunah and galvanize action to solve the problem. It is observed on the Jewish calendar date of the Fast of Esther.

The Fast of Esther was chosen by ICAR as Agunah Day in order to symbolize identification with the Agunah for two contrasting reasons—due to affliction and due to salvation. Like Esther, the agunah of the present era does not want to be in the marriage in which she finds herself. Like Esther, many women who are refused a get live in fear of their spouses and live a double life. Like Esther, the agunah, a victim of get-refusal, finds herself lacking control of her own freedom.

== Male "agunim" ==
The Torah allows a man to have multiple wives, and a child born to a married man with a single woman is not considered to be a mamzer. Thus, while a woman who enters a new relationship while married suffers severe halachic consequences, a man doing the same suffers much lighter consequences. However, in the beginning of the 11th century, Rabbenu Gershom issued a decree prohibiting Jewish men from practising bigamy (though this was not accepted by certain remote Jewish communities such as the Yemenite Jews). To prevent this decree from causing flippant divorces previously unnecessary, Rabbenu Gershom also decreed that "a woman may not be divorced against her will." These decrees made it possible for men to become agunim just as women become agunot, if his wife should disappear or refuse to accept a get.

To resolve the situation of such a man, the heter meah rabbanim (exemption by one hundred rabbis) was established, to permit him to take a second wife (after depositing a get for the first wife with the rabbis). However, due to complexities, costs and other reasons, many husbands do not succeed in obtaining a heter meah rabbanim, and thus remain chained to their wives. In Israel, there are more cases in which women choose not to accept a get when a husband wants to give one, than cases in which the man refuses to grant a get.

There are also cases where the get is offered to protect the wife. For example, if the husband is undertaking a dangerous activity, or is being imprisoned for a lengthy time, he may wish to divorce entirely to help his wife by freeing her. Often, such offers are refused.

== Karaite Judaism ==
Karaite Judaism, which does not recognize the authority of the Talmud, bases its divorce law entirely on the Torah: "A man takes a wife and possesses her. She fails to please him because he finds something obnoxious about her, and he writes her a bill of divorcement, hands it to her, and sends her away from his house." (Deuteronomy 24:1)

Therefore, under Karaite law, it is difficult for a woman to obtain a divorce unless it is explicitly written and delivered by her husband (or an appointed agent) whereas in Rabbinic Judaism there are several rare exceptions and cases where alternatives are available (annulments, forcing the husband to participate)

Section 18 of Mikdash Me'at (an English translation of the Karaite halakhic work Adderet Eliyahu) states:

A writ of divorce is called a sefer keritut. Whether man or wife initiates the divorce, the woman is the one to receive the sefer keritut. The purpose of the sefer keritut is to free a woman from her husband and certify that she may marry another man. It is preferable for the husband to willingly grant his wife a writ of divorce. The Sages differed, however, regarding cases in which the husband refuses to provide the writ. Some Sages held that the beit din may grant a woman a divorce even without a sefer keritut [the equivalent of the Rabbinic Jewish get] from her (ex-)husband. Other Sages, however, argued that the beit din should coerce the man into writing a bill of divorce. This coercion may be done through gentile authorities.

This text clearly refers to known cases where a sefer keritut was denied, though it has been apparently uncommon:

Today, Karaite batei-din may grant women divorces even should the husband refuse to provide a writ. But this has occurred very rarely. As discussed, Rav Bashyatzi notes that some of the classical Sages also held this to be permissible. One such Sage is Rav Levi. Another is the 19th century Sage Rav Yitzchak Ben Shlomo.

Given the absence of agunot, it has been said that "the Karaite halakhah introduced a real reinforcement of women’s rights in matters of divorce: divorce by juridical decree."

== In the arts ==
- Getting Your Man (1996)—A play written and directed by Australian theatre director Margie Fischer for performance by Jewish community members on issues surrounding the Jewish religious divorce and get refusal.

== See also ==
- Lieberman clause (Conservative Judaism)
- Organization for the Resolution of Agunot
