= New York divorce coercion gang =

Kidnap and torture ring

- Founder: Mendel Epstein
- Years active: Mid-1980s to 2013
- Ethnicity: Jewish
- Membership: c. 10
- Leader: Martin Wolmark
- Activities: Kidnapping; torture; intimidation; extortion

The New York divorce coercion gang was a Haredi Jewish group who kidnapped, and in some cases tortured, Jewish men in the New York metropolitan area to force them to grant their wives religious divorces (gittin). The Federal Bureau of Investigation (FBI) broke up the group after conducting a sting operation against the gang in October 2013. The sting resulted in the prosecution of four men, three of whom were convicted in late 2015.

== Background ==
Divorce is permitted in Judaism. Originally, only the husband was granted the power to terminate a marriage, which he could effectuate unilaterally for almost any reason by simply giving his wife a get (divorce document). During the Middle Ages, this rule was amended by Gershom ben Judah, who stipulated that a divorce could only be obtained through the consent of both parties. Henceforth, in order for a woman to receive a religious divorce, halakha (Jewish law) required that she obtain her husband's consent; this would avert the prospect of an invalid second marriage, which carries with it the possibility of her offspring being considered mamzerim (bastards/impure). A contentious divorce must be arbitrated through a competent beth din. Among the valid reasons for divorce in Judaism are impotency, the intentional withholding of sex, injurious disease, apostasy, a verifiable instance of adultery committed by the wife, or certain forms of persistent spousal abuse. If either the husband refuses to grant the get or the wife refuses to accept it, the beth din can implement certain coercive measures on the recalcitrant party; these include community shunning measures, financial penalties, or even physical confinement and/or assault, which can only be implemented after the beth din issues a formal ruling of coercion (kofin). Physical coercion or other types of intimidation initiated against the husband that are not firmly grounded in a ruling of kofin can potentially place the validity of the divorce in doubt. In any case, these measures are most often directed against the husband; in the event of his wife's recalcitrance or insanity, the husband has the option to simply remarry, or—for Ashkenazi Jews—obtain a heter meah rabbanim (lit. 'permission by one hundred rabbis') to remarry.

== History ==
In the mid-1980s, a Haredi rabbi from Brooklyn, New York —Mendel Epstein— began to advocate for women seeking religious divorces from their husbands. Dubbed "The Prodfather" by the press, due to his boast of using a cattle prod against his victims, Epstein coerced these men to divorce their wives through the use of violence. In 1991, fathers' rights activist Monty Weinstein staged a protest with 25 people outside Epstein's home, with some carrying signs that read "Stop Mendel Epstein!". Weinstein had heard stories about Epstein's tactics for years, but nothing ever happened when he complained to the authorities. He said, "What bothered me is that the police and courts didn't care."

On October 23, 1996, while he was walking from the synagogue to his home in Borough Park, Brooklyn, Abraham Rubin was shoved into a van by three masked men, beaten, and shocked with a stun-gun more than 30 times, including in his genitals, until he agreed to give his wife a get. After his 3-hour ordeal, he was left bruised, bloodied, handcuffed, blindfolded, and half-naked at the entrance to a cemetery. The same year, a rabbinical council in neighboring Williamsburg issued a statement condemning the shadowy group of get-enforcers.

In the following year, Rubin filed a civil racketeering lawsuit against Epstein and a conspirator, Martin Wolmark, head of Yeshiva Shaarei Torah of Rockland on West Carlton Road in Suffern, New York. However, charges against his attackers were dropped in 2000 by Brooklyn District Attorney Charles Hynes, after Rubin "could not identify any of his assailants". In 1998, accountant Stephen Weiss alleged that his jaw, leg, and arm were broken in 1992 by members of the gang, but no arrests were made. Newsday interviewed an additional dozen residents of Borough Park and Midwood, Brooklyn, all of whom claimed that they were harassed, threatened, or assaulted by men working for their estranged wives. Hynes agreed to look into the charges, but, despite pressure from the victims, declined to prosecute.

On December 1, 2009, Israel Markowitz was lured from Brooklyn to Lakewood Township, New Jersey, under the pretense of receiving employment at a document shredding establishment. He was then assaulted, placed in a van, tied up, beaten, and shocked with a stun-gun until he agreed to give his wife a get. On October 16, 2010, Yisrael Bryskman, an Israeli citizen, was lured from New York to the Lakewood home of David Wax, an accomplice of Epstein, where he was promised employment as a typist of Talmudic texts. Bryskman entered Wax's home shortly before midnight, was shown into a second-story bedroom, and was immediately punched in the face, breaking his nose. He was then forced to the floor, blindfolded, handcuffed, and ankle-tied. A pool of blood appeared on the carpet. Wax presented Bryskman with a body bag, "to get [you] used to the size". He was then kicked in the ribs, burned with acid, and threatened to be urinated upon, fed to rats, and buried alive, until he agreed to give his wife a get. Wax was paid $100,000 from the wife's family for the document, half of which went to Epstein, and he attempted to extort an additional $50,000 from Bryskman's father in Israel over the phone, threatening that if he didn't comply, he'd receive a "special gift — it's called a bullet ... in your head". On August 22, 2011, in Brooklyn, Usher Chaimowitz and his roommate, Menachem Teitelbaum, were assaulted, tied up, and beaten for two hours, until Chaimowitz agreed to give his wife a get. Teitelbaum was punched in the face, had four of his teeth knocked out, his head pushed through a wall, and his mouth stuffed with dirty socks when he tried to scream for help. When he asked why they were beating him, one of his attackers quoted the Talmudic dictum "Woe to the evildoer, woe to his neighbor".

In October 2010, Wax and his wife Judy were arrested for their part in the Bryskman kidnapping and beating, and Wax subsequently agreed to testify as a government witness, claiming that Epstein was the head of the operation and that his son, David Epstein, was present in the bedroom during the Bryskman beating. The Bryskman case was what led federal authorities in New Jersey to begin their investigation of Mendel Epstein for his role in the crime.

== Sting operation ==
In the summer of 2013, an undercover Federal Bureau of Investigation (FBI) agent dialed Martin Wolmark, and told him her husband refused to give her a get. The agent, together with another agent she identified as her brother, met with Wolmark on August 7, who proceeded to set up a conference call with Epstein. Epstein later said he needed $10,000 to approve the coercion at the beth din, and $60,000 for the "tough guys" who would use karate, rope, a screwdriver, and plastic bags over the men's heads to get them to co-operate. Epstein told the agent that he would not be present at the attack, planning instead to be out and about, and suggested that she do the same, explaining that being seen in public would provide them with an alibi. The agents handed Epstein a check for $10,000, with the word "Consultation" written in the memo. On September 29, Epstein drove from New York across state lines to a warehouse in Edison, New Jersey to stake out the location and verify that it was appropriate to stage a kidnapping and beating there. Four days later, he drove to Suffern to meet with the female agent and Wolmark, who convened the beth din that, in exchange for the fee, would declare that the "husband" is required to divorce his "wife". The rabbis, who were unaware that the agent was recording the meeting, openly discussed the plan to kidnap and assault the husband to force him to provide the get.

== Arrests ==
On October 9, 2013, Wolmark and eight other men gathered at the warehouse in Edison to prepare for the kidnapping. Suddenly, federal agents burst in and arrested the would-be kidnappers. Epstein was arrested separately in Brooklyn, and Wolmark's Suffern yeshiva was raided. At a federal court hearing the following day in Trenton, New Jersey, U.S. Attorney for New Jersey Paul Fishman said, "The charge is kidnapping and extortion. Violent crime to get Jewish men to give divorces they wouldn't otherwise get. It's not really an exercise of religion. It's really about money and violent crime." Assistant U.S. Attorney Joseph Gribko said the gang "didn't do it out of religious conviction. They did it for money". On May 6, 2014, Wax pleaded guilty in federal court in New Jersey to conspiracy to commit kidnapping. He named the men arrested the previous October as his accomplices.

== Criminal trials ==
The trial of the main defendants commenced on February 18, 2015, at the United States District Court for the District of New Jersey in Trenton, before District Judge Freda L. Wolfson. Following an eight-week trial, including four days of jury deliberations, Mendel Epstein was convicted on April 21 of conspiracy to commit kidnapping, but acquitted of kidnapping and attempted kidnapping. Co-defendants Jay Goldstein and Binyamin Stimler were convicted of conspiracy and attempted kidnapping. The jury acquitted David Epstein of all charges. Sholom Shuchat, who had pleaded guilty in June to travelling in inter-state commerce to commit violence, was sentenced on November 19 to time served and two years of supervised release, with the first six months being house arrest. Wolmark, who had pleaded guilty to conspiracy to travel in inter-state commerce to commit extortion, was sentenced to more than three years in prison, two years of supervised release, and a $50,000 fine. Epstein and Stimler were sentenced to 10 years and three years, respectively. Wolfson said during the proceeding that "No one is permitted to commit acts of violence against another" and that the sentence was necessary to deter others in the Jewish community from engaging in similar paid vigilantism. One day later, Goldstein was sentenced to eight years imprisonment. Six other co-defendants also pleaded guilty before trial, and were sentenced to up to four years. On January 12, 2016, David Wax was sentenced by Wolfson to seven years imprisonment.

== Appeals ==
Epstein launched a number of defense arguments in his motion to appeal, ranging from warrant issues to jury questions, but the heart of the appeal focused on the propriety of their actions under the Religious Freedom Restoration Act, saying the FBI sting interfered with their practice of religion. He also argued that the victims, by entering into a Jewish marriage, were essentially agreeing to the use of force outlined in Jewish law. The higher court did not accept these arguments.

== Assessment ==
Rabbinical judge David Eidensohn of Monsey, New York, said, "I'm shocked that people who call themselves rabbis would get involved in coercion." According to Eidensohn, if a woman obtains a get in such a manner and remarries, "Her marriage is not legal, and she would be considered living in sin. If she has children, the children are considered born out of wedlock, and that's considered a disgrace in the community." Eidensohn accused Hershel Schachter of misquoting Maimonides in favor of beating husbands.

Judy Heicklin, president of the Jewish Orthodox Feminist Alliance, said:

It's not bad enough that these women are abused by their husbands. Then they turn to authority figures who are demanding bribes to solve what should be a fundamental human rights issue. It's heartbreaking, the women who are caught in this horrible situation. And it's a shame. It's a stain on our entire community... We think the halakha is so profound and divinely inspired that solutions can and should be found within halakha... I certainly understand the impetus for those kinds of solutions, and why people are so frustrated with the lack of progress that people are reaching out for those solutions out of frustration.

Samuel Heilman, professor of sociology and Jewish studies at Queens College, said, "Using force, that's the way it used to be done centuries ago. Most Jews don't operate like that anymore, but in this community ... it's a sort of fundamentalist view."

Moshe David Tendler, rabbi and professor of medical ethics at Yeshiva University, said, "The idea that a beth din can issue an order for coercion is baloney, a hoax." While conceding that he had "been with [Epstein] on matters", Tendler nevertheless considered him "unreliable".

Mordechai Willig, a leader of the Beth Din of America court of the centrist Rabbinical Council of America, emphasized that rabbis should never do anything illegal, because if one rabbi does something inappropriate, "everyone whose first name is Rabbi is sullied".

Chaim Dovid Zwiebel, the executive director of Agudath Israel of America, stated that Wolmark's court didn't hear what defense might be offered by the husband who was allegedly refusing to grant the get. Zwiebel, who referred to Wolmark as a "well-respected figure in the Jewish community", "an expert in Jewish law", and a "rabbi of caliber" at the time of Wolmark's arrest, later said:

There is a considerable body of opinion that you can only take steps consistent with the law of the land... Some would question the validity of a get that was procured in those circumstances... On the surface of the allegations, this particular scenario was beyond the realm of anything the Halacha might countenance. It seems as if the role of one of the rabbis was to determine whether the circumstances justified a beth din ruling that you could force the guy. It clearly was done in a way that leaves a lot to be desired. The whole case was a sham. The rabbi didn't go on more than a woman's crying and signing a check. It's very troubling... The idea that some have put forward that women should have the same ability to initiate the divorce process, just as a man can divorce a woman against her will – it's clearly contrary to halacha.

The story of this group and their tactics was publicized in a 2014 GQ article by Matt Shaer. In 2020 it was announced that Sister Media has partnered with Taffy Brodesser-Akner to adapt the story into a feature film to be called The Get, but no further developments have been made public.

== See also ==
- Kiryas Joel murder conspiracy
