= Mamzer =

In Judaism, a person born or descended from certain forbidden sexual relationships

Halakhic texts relating to this article
- Torah: Deuteronomy 23:3, Zechariah 9:6
- Babylonian Talmud: Yevamot 49a–b, 69a, 78b, 87b, Kiddushin 67b and 73a
- Shulchan Aruch: Even HaEzer 4

In the Hebrew Bible and Jewish religious law, a mamzer (Hebrew: ממזר, lit., "estranged person"; plural mamzerim) is a person who is born as the result of certain forbidden relationships or incest (as it is defined by the Bible), or the descendant of such a person. Mamzer status (ממזרות, mamzerut) is not synonymous with the traditional Western definition of illegitimacy, since it does not include children born to unmarried mothers.

== Definition ==
=== Etymology ===
Some have explained the word mamzer as the masculine noun form derived from the root m-z-r, having a meaning of spoilt/corrupt.

According to Strong's Concordance: "from an unused root meaning 'to alienate'; a mongrel, i. e., born of a Jewish father and a heathen mother".

The Talmud explains the term homiletically as consisting of the words mum (defect) and zar (strange/alien), a euphemism for an illicit union in the person's lineage.

=== Hebrew Bible usage ===
The term occurs twice in the Hebrew Bible. The first time is Deuteronomy 23:3 (23:2 in non-Hebrew versions). The Septuagint translates the term mamzer as son "of a prostitute" (Greek: ek pornes), and the Latin Vulgate translates it as de scorto natus ("born of a prostitute"). In English, it is often translated as "bastard".

A bastard (mamzer) shall not enter into the congregation of the LORD; even to his tenth generation shall he not enter into the congregation of the LORD.

— Deuteronomy 23:2

The phrase "shall not enter the congregation of the Lord" was interpreted by the Rabbis to mean that the bastard cannot marry a son or daughter of Israel. Alternatively, the "congregation of the Lord" could have referred to the legislature of ancient Israel. The other time is Zechariah 9:6: "And a bastard (mamzer) shall dwell in Ashdod...".

=== Halakhic definitions ===
In the Talmud, the term mamzer is applied to the descendants of specific illicit unions. According to the Mishnah, a mamzer is the offspring of a biblically forbidden union for which his progenitors are liable to extirpation at the hands of heaven. An exception to this rule is when a Jewish man cohabits with a menstruant woman: Although he is liable thereby to extirpation, the child born from such union is not a mamzer. The practical bearing of this ruling is that it excludes from such defamation a child born outside of wedlock, and which child is often wrongly called "bastard" under common law. According to the Shulchan Aruch, a new line of mamzerim can only be produced by two Jews but the product of a non-Jew and a mamzeret (female mamzer) is a mamzer.

There are two categories of mamzerim. A child born of incest, as defined by the Bible, is a mamzer. Note, however, that an incestuous relationship between one or two non-Jews cannot produce a mamzer, and if the product of such a union were to convert, he or she would be the equal of any Jew.

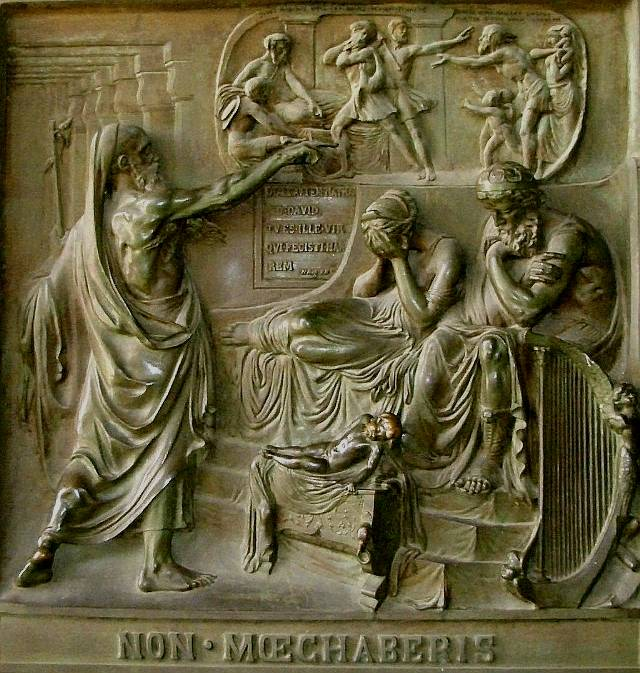
Nathan confronts King David for his adultery with Bathsheba, an affair that produced a mamzer. Bronze bas-relief on the door of La Madeleine, Paris.

A child born of a married Jewish woman's adultery is a mamzer. The child of a single woman and a man she could lawfully have married is not a mamzer. It is irrelevant if the man is married or not. If one of the parents is not Jewish, the child is not a mamzer. Any child born to a married woman, even if she is known to have been unfaithful, is presumed to be her husband's, unless she is so promiscuous that such a presumption becomes unsupportable, or if she enters a public relationship with another man.

A child born within 12 months of a woman's most recent meeting with her husband is presumed to be legitimate, since Jewish law believes that in rare cases, a pregnancy can last that long. However, if more than 9 months have elapsed, and she is known to have been unfaithful, then the presumption does not apply. Modern assisted reproductive technology has complicated the issue. Rabbi Moshe Feinstein ruled that if a married woman is inseminated by sperm from another man, the child is not a mamzer, since it did not result from an act of adultery; Rabbi Joel Teitelbaum disagreed, and ruled that, since the child is known to be that of a man other than her husband, it is a mamzer.

The status of an abandoned child (Hebrew: asufi) was determined by the state in which it was found. If there were indications that the foundling had been abandoned due to the parents being unable to support it, then, halakhically, the child would not be a mamzer. However, if the unknown parents could have supported the child, it was regarded as potentially being a mamzer. A child whose mother is known, but not the father, was known as "silent one" (Hebrew: shetuki), and fell into the same category as a foundling; this status, however, could be changed if the mother knew and revealed the identity of the father.

The mamzer status is hereditary – a child of a mamzer (whether mother or father) is also a mamzer. However, since these rules are regarded as applying only to Jews, and since traditional Rabbinical law regards Jewish status as only transmitted through the mother, the child of a male mamzer and a non-Jewish woman cannot be a mamzer. However, the child of a female mamzer and a non-Jewish man is a mamzer.

== Marriage restrictions ==
The biblical rule against certain people becoming part of the "congregation of the Lord" was interpreted in the Talmud as a prohibition against ordinary Jews marrying such people. Although the biblical passage includes in this up to the tenth generation of the descendants of a mamzer, classical rabbis interpreted this as an idiom meaning "forever". Thus, in traditional Jewish law, a mamzer and his or her descendants are not allowed to marry an ordinary (non-mamzer) Jewish spouse.

The restriction does not prevent a mamzer from marrying another mamzer, nor from marrying a convert to Judaism, or a non-Jewish slave. However, foundlings suspected of being mamzerim were not so free; they were neither permitted to marry a mamzer, nor even to marry another foundling.

This interpretation is not universally shared, with Matthew Poole interpreting the "congregation of the Lord" as being the Israelite theocracy.

== Social status of mamzerim ==
Although in many historical societies, illegitimacy of birth was a quality which could make a person somewhat of an outcast, this was not the official attitude of Judaism; apart from the marriage restrictions, a mamzer is not officially considered a second-class citizen, and is supposed to be treated with as much respect as other Jews. For example, the Mishnah teaches that a learned mamzer should "take precedence" over an ignorant High Priest of Israel; the meaning of "take precedence" is not explicitly explained by the Mishnah, nor by the Talmud in general, although the preceding part of the Mishnah uses it to refer to the priority in which people should be rescued from danger, while other parts of the Mishnah use the phrase to refer to the priority in which people should receive aliyot.

Rabbis in the Talmud, and those in the Middle Ages, saw fit to spell out that, aside from in questions of marriage, a mamzer should be treated as an ordinary Jew. The Talmud insists that a mamzer should be considered as an ordinary relative for the purpose of inheritance, including levirate marriage. Maimonides and Joseph ben Ephraim Karo see fit to repeat this, and confirm that a mamzer can serve as a judge. Similarly, a tosafa insists that it is permissible for a mamzer to become a king.

The status of mamzerim could even be relinquished, either by the mamzer marrying a servant or the mamzer becoming a servant themselves, with their status being immediately relinquished upon their release.

== Modern investigations into mamzer status ==
=== Orthodox Judaism ===
The principal approach in Orthodox Judaism is to require strict evidentiary standards for mamzer status, sufficiently strict that proof of the existence of mamzer status is hard to develop and generally does not arise. Typically, it is impossible to prove either that a prior marriage ever existed, or that a child was born of relations outside that marriage. Orthodox rabbis always allow the suspect child the benefit of the doubt in this matter. This usually leads to the conclusion that at the time of a person's birth, their parents were married, or that the person is the child of a man and woman who were married to each other when the child was conceived.

An example is a contemporary responsum by Rabbi Ovadia Yosef, establishing the impossibility to prove mamzer status in a case where the evidence might appear to be clear-cut. The case involved the daughter of an aguna who had been married by a Haredi rabbi to a husband who subsequently converted to Christianity and refused to participate in a Jewish divorce. The mother eventually divorced and remarried civilly, and had the daughter years later. The daughter had been raised as an Orthodox Jew and attended Beit Yaakov, a Haredi day school. The daughter brought up the question of her status herself prior to an impending marriage. Rabbi Yosef proceeded systematically to disqualify evidence that a prior marriage had ever taken place. The mother's evidence was immediately disqualified as an interested party. The ketubah (Jewish marriage contract/certificate) was never found. The rabbi who performed the marriage was contacted, but Rabbi Yosef wrote that his testimony could not be accepted without the ketubah, and in any event required corroboration by two witnesses. Attempts to contact the husband were abandoned after an adversarial conversation with his new, non-Jewish wife. Even if the husband could have been reached, he would only have been one witness, and his testimony could not have been accepted without a second witness. Thus, Rabbi Yosef concluded there was insufficient evidence that a valid prior marriage had ever taken place. Rabbi Yosef then proceeded to establish the possibility that the former husband might be the daughter's father. The mother testified that her former husband occasionally brought alimony payments and came for visitation in person, and hence, the two were sometimes at least momentarily alone together. Applying an ancient rule that when a husband and wife are known to be alone together behind a closed door, the law presumes sexual intercourse may well have taken place, Rabbi Yosef concluded that it was possible that the former husband was the daughter's father, and hence, Jewish law, which very strongly construes all evidence in favour of birth within marriage, had to presume that he was. Thus, Rabbi Yosef concluded that there was insufficient evidence of either a former marriage or that the new husband was the father, and hence, he concluded that there was insufficient evidence of mamzerut status. Rabbi Yosef said, "The ruling therefore must be that there is very great reason to permit this woman to marry and enter the congregation of God, and as it appears to me have I written."

Conservative rabbi Daniel S. Nevins, commenting on this case, noted that the box of traditional tools Rabbi Yosef used to discredit evidence of mamzer status may be sufficiently robust as to cover virtually all cases of inquiry in the types of situations a congregation rabbi would be likely to experience. Nonetheless, Orthodox rabbinical authorities hold that while contemporary rabbis have authority to refine procedural rules such as rules of evidence, they do not have the authority to abolish biblically mandated categories or procedures entirely.

Israeli law tries to prevent the conferring of mamzer status by refusing to allow men other than the husband or recent ex-husband from registering as a child's father without a court order. However, paternity tests have the potential to reveal mamzer status by removing the protection of the presumption of paternity on the part of a married woman's actual husband.

=== Conservative Judaism ===
The Committee on Jewish Law and Standards (CJLS) of the Rabbinical Assembly of Conservative Judaism has declared that Conservative Rabbis should not inquire into or accept evidence of mamzer status under any circumstances, rendering the category inoperative. In doing so, the CJLS distinguished the Conservative approach to Jewish law from the Orthodox approach, noting that Conservative Judaism regards Biblical law as only the beginning of a relationship rather than a final word, and that the Conservative movement regards it as its role and responsibility to revise Biblical law from time to time when such law conflicts with evolving concepts of morality.

=== Karaite Judaism ===
In Zechariah 9:6, "mamzer" is referenced similar to that of the nations of Ammon, Moab, Edom, Egypt, Tyre, Zidon, Ashkelon, Gaza, Philistia, etc. From such, Karaites have come to consider the most logical understanding of the Hebrew to actually refer to a nation of people. Karaites believe that such an understanding fits perfectly into the context of both Deuteronomy 23 and Zechariah 9, and several Medieval rabbinical Jewish sages felt it necessary to debate this topic with medieval Karaite Jewish sages.

== In Israeli law ==
In the modern State of Israel, the law concerning matters of marriage, divorce, and personal status, is partially under the jurisdiction of religious courts. For example, there is no civil marriage in Israel. The Jewish religious regulations concerning mamzerim are thus also the national laws imposed on Jews living in Israel, including secular Jews. Because of the severe impediments to marriage which mamzer status accords in Jewish law, Israeli civil law has taken the position that the paternity of a child born within a marriage cannot legally be challenged in civil courts, in order to avoid creating a body of evidence that might be used to declare the child a mamzer, or create difficulties for a future marriage.

The existence of mamzer status as a category in Israeli family law has been criticized. An extensive review and opinion advocating the adoption of civil marriage in Israel, written by Prof. Pinhas Shifman and published in July 2001 by the Association for Civil Rights in Israel (ACRI), mentions Mamzer among the categories of Israelis which, Professor Shifman believes, should have the right to marry spouses of their choice, and, he argues, current Israeli law interferes with, and denies, this right. Professor Shifman and ACRI advocate ending the religious monopoly over marriage in Israel, and cite the existence and difficulties of mamzer status as an argument against the use of religious law in marriage cases.

Israeli religious courts resolve mamzer status by generally ruling that the child was born within the marriage, despite the existence of evidence to the contrary. This convenient formula sometimes causes difficulties for lovers or subsequent spouses who wish to assert paternity over a child which may be biologically theirs. A 2006 case, in which a child born eight months and two weeks after a divorce, was declared the former husband's child, rather than the child of the wife's subsequent husband, and this was reported as causing a dilemma for the subsequent couple.

Nonetheless, the existence of the category of Mamzer, and the marital impediments inherent to it, is one of the arguments frequently used by Israeli secularists in calling for separation of religion and state, and for the institution of civil marriage. In 2014, the Center for Women's Justice announced it would petition the Israeli Supreme Court to bar secret blacklists of mamzerim by rabbinical courts, claiming they are an invasion of privacy.

== Connection with French medieval nicknames ==
A persistent etymology of the surname Manser is connected to Hebrew mamzer. Supposedly Ebalus of Aquitaine (Count of Poitou and Duke of Aquitaine, c. 870 – 935) had the nickname "Manzer" or "Manser". As he is known to have been a bastard and reputed to have had a Jewish mother, this nickname is considered to be derived from mamzer. A similar explanation is offered also for the same nickname as used by another prince from Occitania: Arnaud Manzer, a 10th-century count of Angoulême who also was a bastard. William the Conqueror may have been referred to as Bastardus and Mamzer.
