= Organization for the Resolution of Agunot =

New York-based charitable organization

- Abbreviation: ORA
- Founded: 2002
- Founder: students at Yeshiva University
- Tax ID no.: 81-0582070
- Legal status: Charitable organization
- Location: New York, United States
- Methods: advocacy, support, education, subsidies
- Co-CEOs: Yonatan Klayman & Jennifer Lankin
- Website: getora.org

The Organization for the Resolution of Agunot (ORA) is a New York-based non-profit organization that advocates for the elimination of the infliction of abuse from the Jewish divorce process. The organization advocates on behalf of agunot and promotes the universal adoption of Jewish prenuptial agreements for the prevention of get-refusal (a get is a bill of Jewish divorce). Although 98% of the people ORA helps are women, they also support men whose wives refuse to accept a get. ORA views get-refusal as a form of domestic abuse. The organization is currently led by co-CEOs Yonatan Klayman and Jennifer Lankin.

== History ==
ORA was founded in 2002 by a group of Yeshiva University students. Since then, the organization has resolved over 220 cases of get-refusal, and at any given time is actively involved in approximately 50 open agunah cases. In 2014, the Slingshot Guide named ORA as one of the most innovative non-profit organizations in North America for its success in "advocating for vulnerable women and changing the conversation about divorce in the Orthodox community".

== Advocacy efforts ==
ORA resolves cases of get-refusal by combining facilitation with advocacy. Their strategies may include "staging protests in front of a husband's home and office, urging his community and synagogue to keep him out, raising awareness in the media and applying financial and legal pressure."

ORA's advocacy efforts on behalf of agunot have been covered by several major newspapers, including The New York Times, New York Post, Washington Post, Newsweek, The Daily Beast, New York Daily News, and The Huffington Post.

== Educational initiatives ==
ORA's Agunah Prevention Initiative raises awareness in the Jewish community about the importance of signing the Jewish prenuptial agreement for the prevention of get-refusal. The tagline of their initiative is: "Friends don't let friends get married without the halachic prenup", and in November 2014, ORA released a video to promote that message. While there is no way to know definitively if Jewish prenuptial agreements are becoming more popular in the Orthodox world, Rabbi Shlomo Weissmann, Director of the Beth Din of America, stated that, "Anecdotally, there appears to have been a big increase in awareness and usage in the last few years."
