= Lieberman clause =

New provision on divorce in a Jewish wedding agreement

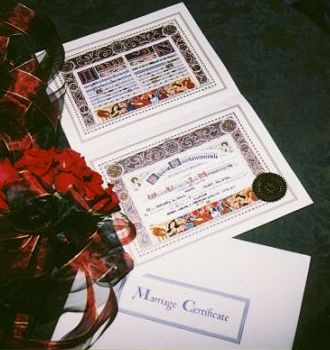
A modern ketubah (Jewish wedding contract).

The Lieberman clause is a clause included in a ketubah (Hebrew: כתובה Jewish wedding document), created by and named after Talmudic scholar and Jewish Theological Seminary of America professor Saul Lieberman, that stipulates that divorce will be adjudicated by a modern bet din (rabbinic court) in order to prevent the problem of the agunah, a woman not allowed to remarry religiously because she had never been granted a religious divorce. It was first introduced in the 1950s by rabbis in Judaism's Conservative movement.

== Background ==
According to halakha (Jewish law) when a couple gets divorced it is the man who has to present the woman with a bill of divorce, and the woman who has to consent to receive it, called a get. Without one, the couple is still viewed as married, whether a civil divorce is obtained or not. In the past, if a woman was refused a divorce because a man would not give his wife a get, the rabbis of the local Jewish community were authorized, under certain circumstances, to force the husband to do so (e.g., his refusal to be intimate with his wife as well as not giving the get, or other such serious matters). However, since the Haskalah, local Jewish communities lost their autonomous status, and were subsumed into the nation in which they existed. The Jewish community lost its civil powers to enforce marriage and divorce laws. The unintended result was that rabbis lost the power to force a man to give his wife a get, and Jewish law does not allow a woman to give a get to the husband. Without a get, a Jewish woman is forbidden to remarry and is therefore called an agunah (literally "a chained woman").

For decades, traditional voices within the Rabbinical Assembly (RA) counseled that Conservative Jews should take no unilateral action on this issue, and should wait for solutions or joint action from the Orthodox community. While numerous solutions were offered, none were accepted. Eventually, liberal voices within the Rabbinical Assembly won out, and the movement authorized unilateral action.

Lieberman developed a clause to be added to the ketubah (Jewish wedding document). In effect, it was an arbitration agreement used in the case of a divorce; if the marriage dissolved and the woman was refused a get from her husband, both the husband and wife were to go to a rabbinic court authorized by the Jewish Theological Seminary of America and heed their directives, which could (and usually did) include ordering a man to give his wife a get.

According to leaders of the Conservative movement, a meeting was held between the leaders of the RA, representing the Conservative movement, and the Rabbinical Council of America (RCA), the largest organization of Orthodox rabbis, in an effort to find agreement that the clause was valid from the standpoint of Jewish law, and would be included in both Orthodox and Conservative documents. The premise of the meetings was to create a beth din (rabbinic court) similar to that of the Chief Rabbinate of Israel which would be the supreme authority on all halakhic issues related to marriage and divorce in America for both the Orthodox and Conservative. In addition to the meetings held by the RA and RCA, private meetings took place between Saul Lieberman and Joseph B. Soloveitchik, who discussed the creation of this body. While all the members of the beth din would unquestionably be Orthodox poskim, there was discussion as to the possibility of the Leiberman clause being amended by Soloveitchik in order to make it more acceptable to the Orthodox, so as to facilitate its being included in Orthodox ketubahs. However, the beit din was never formed, and the Orthodox movement never acted to include the clause; all Orthodox rabbis seem to have united in their rejection of the clause as a violation of Jewish law. As a result, it has only been used for wedding documents and ceremonies in some (but not all) non-Orthodox denominations of Judaism.

== Changes in Conservative usage ==
This clause is still used in many ketubot used by Conservative Jews today. In the intervening years, however, there has been growing concern regarding the legal validity of this clause due to the United States stand on the separation of church and state. For that reason, state courts have disagreed in terms of recognition of this clause, in a religious document, in a civilian legal setting.

As a response to this concern, a separate letter was drawn up, and signed by the prospective bride and groom, acknowledging that the conditions of the ketuba had been explained to them, and that this letter would be recognized by them as a separate civil document, enforceable in U.S. courts.

However, even some Conservative rabbis grew to have misgivings about the religious validity of this approach, eventually leading the joint bet din of the Conservative movement to develop alternative approaches to the problem of the agunah, which include but are not limited to hafka'at kiddushin (Hebrew: הפקעת קידושין), retroactive annulment of the marriage.

== See also ==
- Jewish views on marriage
