= Center for Women's Justice =

Israeli public interest law firm

The Center for Women's Justice (Hebrew: מרכז צדק לנשים, romanized: Merkaz Tzedek LeNashim) is a public interest law firm devoted to advancing and protecting the rights of women to justice, equality and dignity under Jewish law in Israel. CWJ is a member organization of ICAR, the International Coalition for Agunah Rights.

== History ==
=== First cases and approach to changing the system ===
The Center for Women's Justice (CWJ) was founded in Jerusalem in 2004, by attorney Susan Weiss. CWJ initiated the practice of suing recalcitrant husbands (men who refuse to divorce their wives under the authority of Jewish law) for financial damages (torts) in Israel's civil courts. CWJ has stated that they intend to file as many claims for get abuse as possible across the country. Their declared goal is to make it an established legal certainty in Israeli courts that get refusal is no longer understood as a religious right, but rather as a civil wrong requiring the awarding of financial damages.

In 2007 CWJ sued the Israeli Justice Ministry for NIS 4.5 million on behalf of an Israeli woman who had been denied a divorce from her husband for 18 years. The suit alleged that the Supreme Rabbinical Court was guilty of criminal negligence for having assisted the husband in extorting the wife in exchange for a divorce. In 2010 CWJ was one of a number of organizations who filed suit against Israeli Justice Minister Yaakov Neeman to repeal an Israeli law which prevents women from applying for the position of the executive director of the Rabbinical court. CWJ currently provides professional training for attorneys, legal advocacy and education about harmful rabbinic practices. They are funded by a variety of foundations including the New Israel Fund, the Hadassah Foundation and the National Council of Jewish Women.

=== Involvement in conversion issues ===
CWJ became involved in conversion issues in Israel when they took on a client whose Jewish status had come into question during a standard divorce case. In the process of divorce proceedings the Rabbinic judge began to question the religious observance of the wife, a convert to Judaism. Instead of receiving a divorce, the Rabbinic courts revoked the conversion—an unheard of decision—as according to Jewish tradition a conversion once completed is irrevocable. The original decision not only revoked the woman and her children's Jewish status, but also brought into question all of the conversions done under the authority of Rabbi Haim Drukman, the head of the Conversion Authority within the Israeli Prime Minister's office. CWJ was joined in the suit by several organizations including Na'amat, WIZO and Emunah.

==== Debate over civil and religious jurisdiction ====
In May 2009, the Israeli High Court of Justice gave the dayanim of the Supreme Rabbinical Court 90 days to justify their decision to revoke the conversions done under the auspices of Rabbi Haim Druckman's conversion court. One of the petitioners was represented by CWJ. Shimon Ya'acobi, attorney for the Rabbinic courts argued that the matter rested solely under the jurisdiction of the religious courts and the secular courts had no authority to rule on the matter. Druckman's special conversion court, while dealing exclusively with religious conversion, operated out of the Prime Minister's office and was not under the jurisdiction of the Rabbinical courts.

== Educational projects ==
CWJ's educational efforts include a series of YouTube videos. These videos feature a fictional character known as Savta Bikorta (lit. Grandmother Criticism) who narrates the stories of some of CWJ's real-life court cases in a highly sarcastic tone. In the summer of 2011, CWJ introduced a blog. Blog posts feature CWJ staff, volunteers and interns grappling with the issues they encounter in their daily work with the organization. CWJ Social Awareness Coordinator Rivkah Lubitch has a regular column on Ynet, a major Israeli news site, in which she discusses issues of religion, state and gender as experienced in her work with CWJ.
