= Kiryas Joel murder conspiracy =

Murder plot caused by divorce refusal

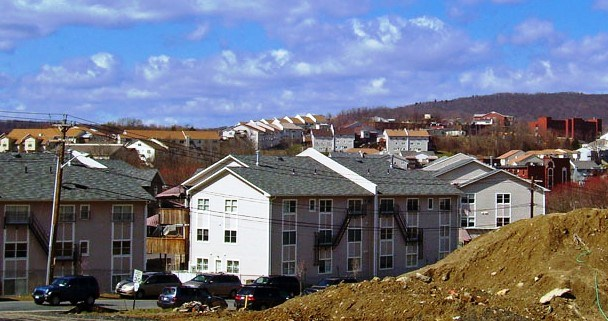
- Kiryas Joel, New York in 2006
- Location: 41°20′24″N 74°10′2″W; Orange County, New York
- Date: 2016
- Target: Joseph Masri
- Attack type: Conspiracy to commit kidnapping and murder
- Perpetrators: Aharon Goldberg, Shimen Liebowitz, Binyamin Gottlieb

The Kiryas Joel murder conspiracy was the planned kidnapping and murder of Joseph Masri, a Hasidic resident of the village of Kiryas Joel, New York in a troubled marriage who had refused to give his wife a get, a Jewish divorce document. The plot was hatched during the summer of 2016 by Shimen Liebowitz, a divorce mediator from Kiryas Joel, Aharon Goldberg, an Israeli rabbi from Bnei Brak, and Binyamin Gottlieb. A fourth conspirator, operating under the pseudonym Joe Levin, turned out to be an informant for the Federal Bureau of Investigation, whose agents arrested the suspects in a sting operation before the crime could be committed. The trio were convicted and sentenced in 2017 to prison.

== Background ==
Under Jewish marital law, a married woman who wishes to remarry cannot do so until her husband first provides her with a divorce document known as a get, or otherwise upon his death. A woman who lacks the ability to remarry is known as an agunah.

Joseph Masri, a taxi driver from Kiryas Joel, New York had been living there with his wife and children when his marriage started to have problems. At one point he separated from his family, moving to Williamsburg, Brooklyn to live with his father. His wife began to reach out to prominent rabbis of the community seeking permission to remarry.

== Kidnapping and murder plot ==
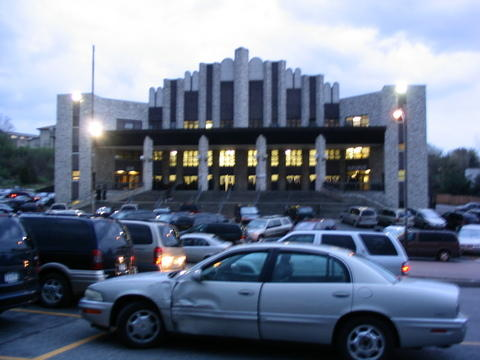
The main synagogue in Kiryas Joel

Shimen Liebowitz, a Satmar Hasid raised in Melbourne, Australia who came to Kiryas Joel at the age of 16 to attend the rabbinical college there, was an internet entrepreneur who dabbled in divorce mediation as a sideline. He was approached by the wife's family to see if anything could be done to convince Masri to grant her a divorce, since by this point she had been waiting 10 years for the document. Liebowitz turned to Aharon Goldberg, a Satmar affiliated Israeli rabbi prominent in the Kiryas Joel community who stated that while he is "very strong" in obtaining gets in Israel, he hasn't any "soldiers" for this purpose in the United States.

In July 2016, an Airmont, New York man and father of 5 named Binyamin Gottlieb, alleged to having had a history of forcing gets, introduced the pair to Joe Levin, an informant whose real name was Avraham Lehrer. Levin, who advertised himself as a private investigator and divorce consultant to the Orthodox community was later described by defense attorneys as a "small-time fraudster" who disliked members of the Satmar sect. The three held a meeting in Rockland County, New York where a payment of $25,000 was discussed, and the possibilities of kidnapping Masri in Pennsylvania or Ukraine, a country that Masri intended to travel to for Rosh Hashanah, in order to torture him there into giving the get. Gottlieb delivered the payment, and discussed the possibility of luring the victim to Puerto Rico. On August 9, 2016, a second meeting of the three near Zenta Road in Kiryas Joel that was recorded by Levin for the Federal Bureau of Investigation (FBI), narrowed down the plot to Ukraine. During a meeting of the three held 3 days later, the venue was changed back to the United States, and the two men gave Levin an additional $20,000 for planning.

Goldberg subsequently met Levin in Israel, where the former expressed his desire to not only kidnap Masri but also to kill him.

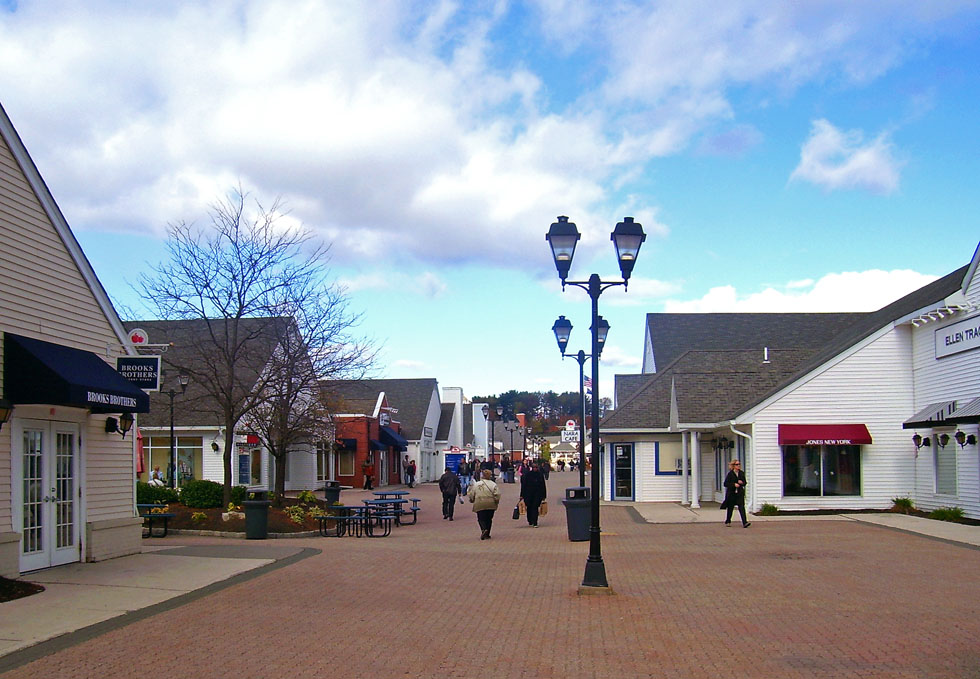
Woodbury Commons promenade

On August 25, 2016, Liebowitz met up with Levin at Woodbury Common Premium Outlets in Central Valley, New York to pay him an additional $12,000 that he had demanded. Levin called Goldberg, who was in Israel at the time, and spoke to him in Modern Hebrew over speakerphone about the "wedding in America," understood by the FBI to be a reference to the kidnapping that was to take place in the United States. Levin said, "Yes, the wedding is in America, but we've also spoken about ... chesed shel emet", using a Hebrew term that refers to caring for the dead. After a brief silence, Goldberg responded,

Yes, yes, yes, this is between you and me ...

Oh, but Shimen doesn't know anything?

This is my order. Don't involve anyone else...nothing has happened, but this is my agreement, no other rabbi will agree to what I've agreed on.

On September 2, 2016, Levin met Liebowitz at Woodbury Commons, and from the conversation they had he appeared to know exactly what Goldberg had planned, even though Liebowitz did not understand the Modern Hebrew language. Liebowitz opined that Masri, a taxi driver who occasionally traveled to Montreal could "miss a night, or even two or three" before his family grew concerned. Liebowitz added:

I can tell you in the back of my mind, it looks like his parents will be happy when it happens.

If he's fucking dead? Okay.

Liebowitz then laughed and said he would carry on as if he knew nothing, letting the blame fall to Goldberg and the wife's family.

Although Liebowitz later questioned the need to kill the victim instead of merely torturing him, Levin suggested they change the operation from a kidnapping to a murder.

== Arrests and convictions ==
The FBI worked together with the New York City Police Department under the Joint Organized Crime Task Force in order to bring the conspirators to justice. On September 6, 2016, Goldberg and Liebowitz met with Levin at a hotel in Central Valley. Levin told the two that "Masri was half dead already," and they agreed to "do the bullet." Goldberg said he would need proof of death to present to the beth din in order to declare the marriage over. Liebowitz asked Goldberg:

So there's going to be a video and you are going to give it around to the world or what? Are you prepared that if the government knocks at a Rabbi's home he will say that Aharon Goldberg is the witness?

As Levin promised to give Goldberg a video of the victim with a bullet in his head, the FBI burst in and arrested Goldberg and Liebowitz.

At a news conference the following day, Manhattan U.S. Attorney Preet Bharara referred to the plot as "chilling."

On September 11, 2016, Binyamin Gottlieb was arrested as he boarded a flight to Ukraine at John F. Kennedy International Airport in Queens, New York.

On July 27, 2017, Liebowitz pleaded guilty to conspiracy to commit extortion.

On September 15, 2017, Gottlieb pleaded guilty to concealing a felony.

On September 28, 2017, Goldberg pleaded guilty to conspiracy to commit kidnapping and murder-for-hire.

On November 30, 2017, U.S. District Judge Sidney H. Stein sentenced Goldberg to 3 years in prison, Liebowitz to 2 years, and Gottlieb to 1 year's probation.
