= Ketubah =

Jewish marriage document

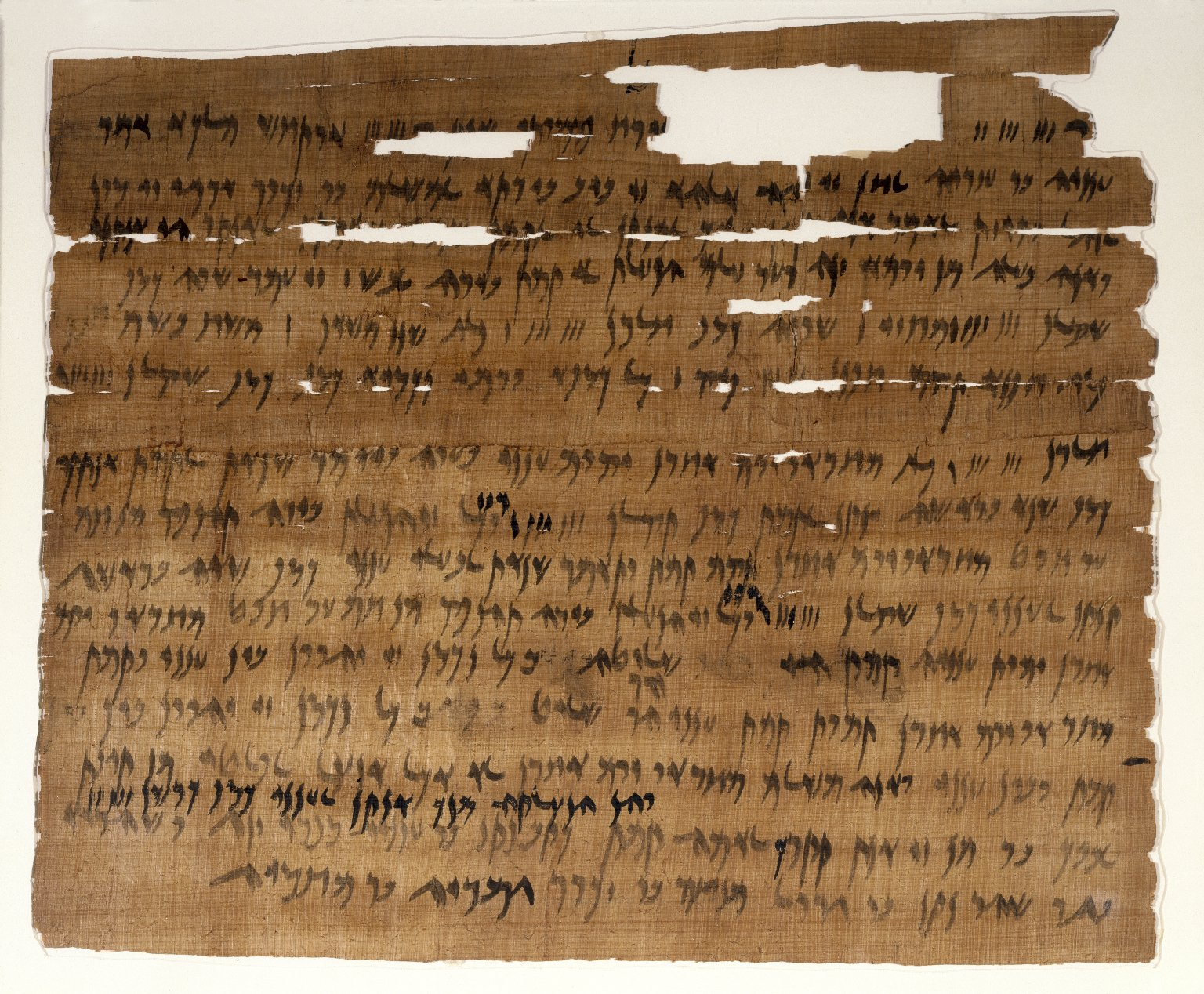
Marriage document of Ananiah and Tamut, written in Aramaic, July 3, 449 B.C.E., Brooklyn Museum

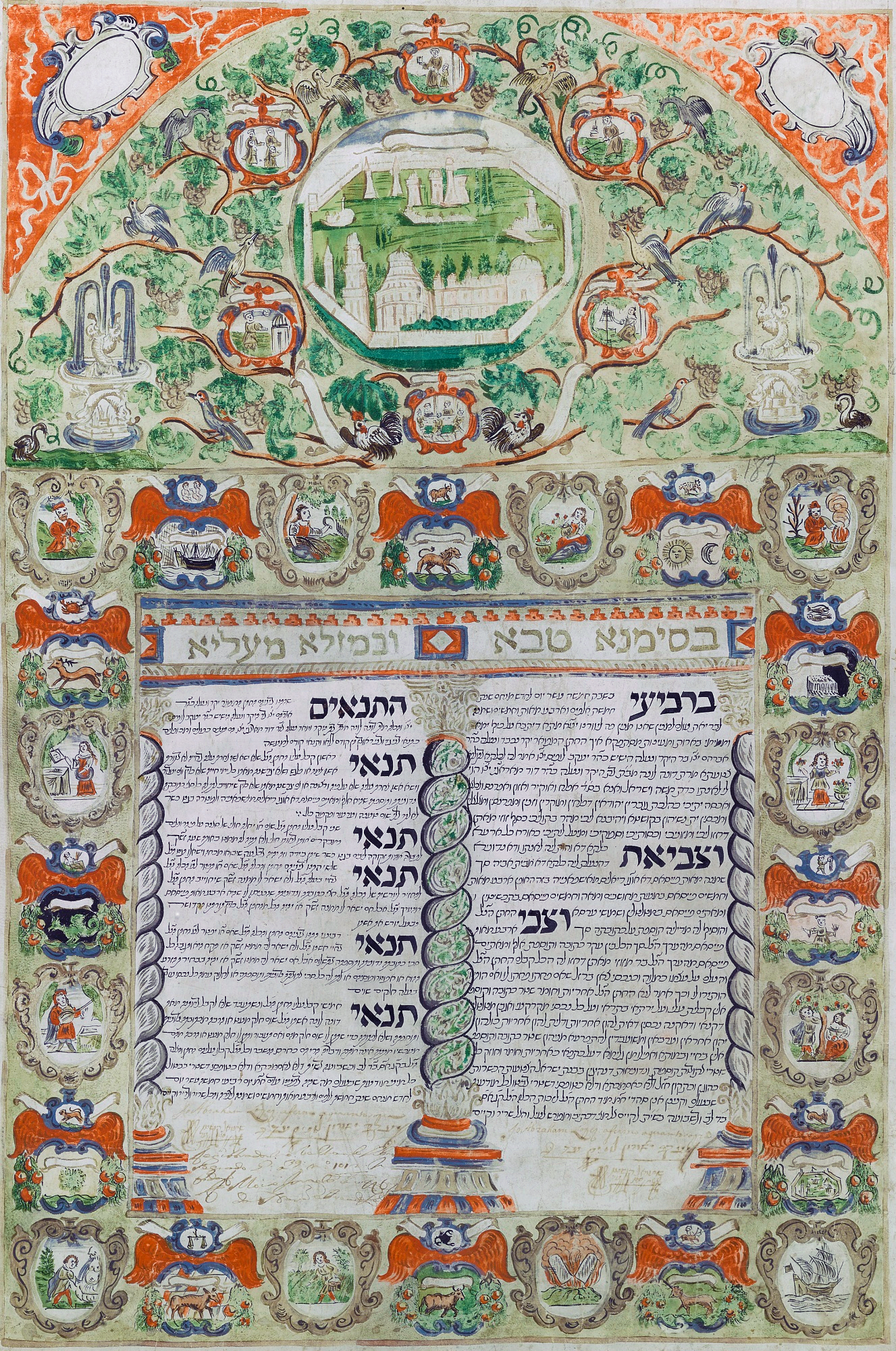
An illuminated ketubah

A ketubah (/kɛtuːˈbɑː/; Hebrew: כְּתוּבָּה) is a Jewish marriage contract. It is considered an integral part of a traditional Jewish marriage, and outlines the rights and responsibilities of the groom, in relation to the bride. In modern practice, the ketubah has no agreed monetary value, and is seldom enforced by civil courts, except in Israel.

== History ==
According to the Babylonian Talmud, the ketubah was enacted by Simeon ben Shetach so that it might not be a light thing for a man to divorce his wife. The enactment provides for a man's wife to receive a fixed sum of money, usually accruing from his property, in the event of his divorcing her or of his predeceasing her. Sefer ha-Chinuch suggests a different reason: "...the Torah has commanded us to perform an act before taking a wife, a matter that is intended to show that they are a couple united in wedlock before he lies down with her carnally, and that he not come upon her as one would do to a harlot, where there is no other act that precedes what goes on between them..."

The rabbis in ancient times insisted on the marriage couple entering into the ketubah as a protection for the wife. It acted as a replacement of the biblical mohar, the price paid by the groom to the bride, or her parents, for the marriage (i.e., the bride price). The ketubah served as a contract, whereby the amount due to the wife (the bride-price) came to be paid in the event of the cessation of marriage, either by the death of the husband or divorce. The biblical mohar created a major social problem: many young prospective husbands could not raise the mohar at the time when they would normally be expected to marry. So, to enable these young men to marry, the rabbis, in effect, delayed the time that the amount would be payable, when they would be more likely to have the sum. The mechanism adopted was to provide for the mohar to be a part of the ketubah. Both the mohar and the ketubah amounts served the same purpose: the protection for the wife should her support by her husband (either by death or divorce) cease. The only difference between the two systems was the timing of the payment. A modern secular equivalent would be the entitlement to alimony in the event of divorce.

The ketubah amount served as a disincentive for the husband contemplating divorcing his wife: he would need to have the amount in order to be able to pay to his wife. Unless the husband pledged otherwise, the minimum obligation towards a man's virgin bride is 200 silver denaria (מאתים זוז), known as the principal (or dower's price), and 100 silver denaria (מאה זוז) for a man who married a widow or divorced woman. This was paid in full from a man's property in the event of his divorcing her during her lifetime, or of his pre-deceasing her. This same sum, according to Mishnaic exegete Obadiah of Bertinoro, who cites Maimonides, is always 1/8 the weight of the 'Shekel of the Sanctuary' (Tyrian coinage), which for every 200 shekels in Tyrian coinage, only 25 were required to be pledged in a virgin's ketubah, a sum equivalent to 200 provincial silver denaria. Based on the anatomical weight of 25 shekels in Tyrian coinage, the minimum amount vouched in a virgin's ketubah amounted to 504 grams of fine silver.

Monies pledged in a woman's ketubah can be written in local currencies, but must have the transactional market-value of the aforementioned weight in silver. Most ketubot also contain an additional liability, known as the "additional jointure" (Heb. תוספת = increment), whereby the groom pledges additional money to his bride. In Ashkenazi tradition, the custom is to consolidate these different financial obligations, or pledges, into one single, aggregate sum. In other Jewish communities, the custom was to write out all financial obligations as individual components.

=== Archaeological discoveries ===
The ketubah of Babatha, a 2nd-century woman who lived near the Dead Sea, was discovered in 1960 in the Cave of Letters.

A comparable Aramaic marriage contract, belonging to an Idumaean couple, was inscribed on seven ostraca discovered at Maresha and dated to 176 BCE; it is the earliest known marriage contract written on pottery in Israel and shows parallels to the Mishnaic version of the Jewish ketubah and to Egyptian Demotic marriage contracts.

Over two hundred ketubot were discovered, among other manuscripts, in the Cairo Geniza. They date between the 6th and 19th centuries and, whilst many consist of plain text, there are examples that use decorative devices such as micrography and illumination to elaborate them.

== Composition ==
=== Content ===
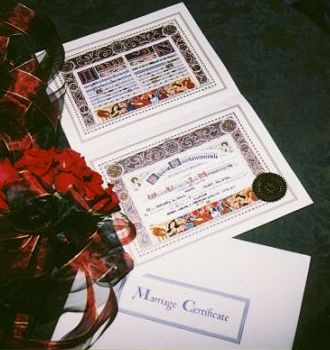
A modern ketubah

The content of the ketubah is in essence a two-way contract that formalizes the various requirements by Halakha (Jewish law) of a Jewish husband vis-à-vis his wife. The Jewish husband takes upon himself in the ketubah the obligation that he will provide to his wife three major things: clothing, food and conjugal relations, and also that he will pay her a pre-specified amount of cash in the case of a divorce. The principal endowment pledged in a ketubah is 200 zuz for a virgin, and 100 zuz otherwise (such as for a widow, a convert, or a divorced woman, etc.). Today, such pledges are made in local currency, and often exceed that of the principal. Thus the content of the ketubah essentially dictates the wife's rights in the marriage and provides for her security and protection. (Conservative Jews often include an additional paragraph, called the Lieberman clause, which stipulates that divorce will be adjudicated by a modern rabbinical court (a beth din) in order to prevent the creation of a chained wife.) The conditions written in the marriage contract may vary between communities, as in the case of the Yemenite ketubah, where the custom in Yemen was not to consolidate the different financial obligations, or pledges, into one single, aggregate sum as is practised by some communities. Rather, all financial obligations were written out as individual components, and had the same fixed sums for all persons. The Chief Rabbinate in Israel has sought to bring uniformity to the ketubah, particularly where Jewish communities in the Diaspora had upheld conflicting traditions.

As in most contracts made between two parties, there are mutual obligations, conditions and terms of reciprocity for such a contract to hold up as good. Thus said R. Yannai: "The conditions written in a ketubah, [when breached], are tantamount to [forfeiture of] the ketubah." A woman who denied coitus unto her husband, a condition of the ketubah, was considered legal grounds for forfeiture of her marriage contract, with the principal and additional jointure being written off.

==== Bat-Kohen variation ====
The priestly court (prior to 70 CE) established that a virgin bat-kohen would receive a ketubah of 400 Zuz (rather than the standard 200 Zuz for a Jewish virgin). However, the Talmud Yerushalmi opines that the bat-kohen who marries a non-Kohen receives that standard 200 Zuz, as a penalty for not marrying within the priesthood. A widowed bat-kohen would receive the standard 100 Zuz for widows, though at one point this sum had been raised to 200 Zuz.

=== Design and language ===
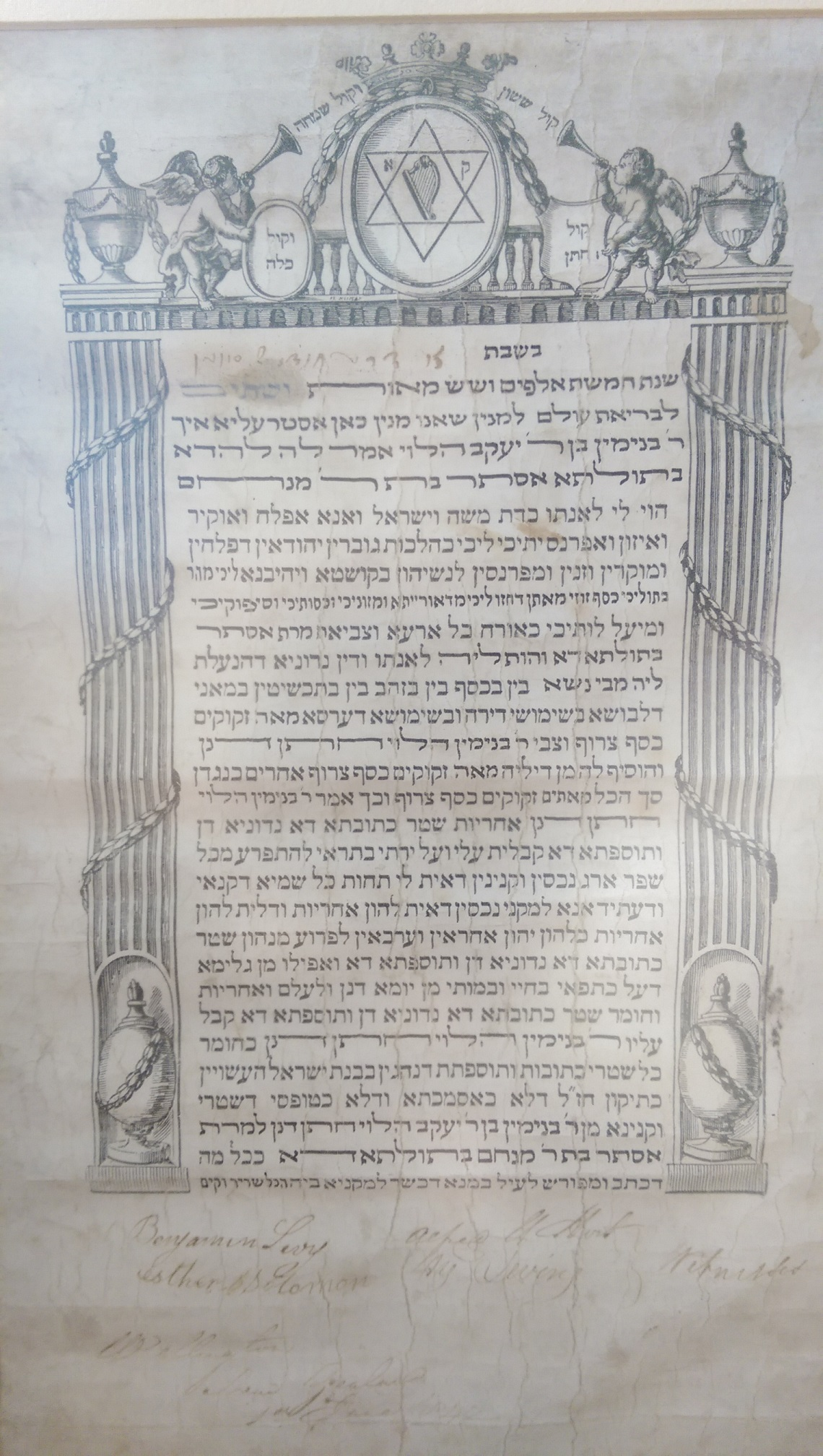
Wedding certificate for Esther Solomon and Benjamin Levy, Wellington, New Zealand, 1 June 1842, witnessed by Alfred Hort and Nathaniel William Levin

The ketubah is a significant popular form of Jewish ceremonial art. Ketubot have been made in a wide range of designs, usually following the tastes and styles of the era and region in which they are made. Today, styles and decorations on ketubahs are chosen by the couple as a representation of their personal styles. This is contrasting to other Jewish legal or sacred texts (such as the Talmud, Mishnah, etc.), which cannot be decorated.

Traditional ketubot are not written in the Hebrew language, but in Aramaic, the lingua franca of Jews at the time ketubot became standardized. This was done in order to make sure the bride and groom understood the contract that was being signed. Many contemporary ketubot have translations into English or other vernacular languages or an accompanying vernacular text. Many Conservative Jews and other non-Orthodox Jews use ketubot written in Hebrew rather than in Aramaic. Others may use Aramaic ketubot but also have an additional official version in Hebrew.

In recent years ketubot have become available in a variety of formats as well as the traditional Aramaic text used by the Orthodox community. Available texts include Conservative text, using the Lieberman Clause, Reform, Egalitarian and Interfaith texts. Some congregations have texts available for same sex couples too. In addition, Secular Humanist and Anniversary texts are also available today.

== Usage ==
=== Role in wedding ceremony ===
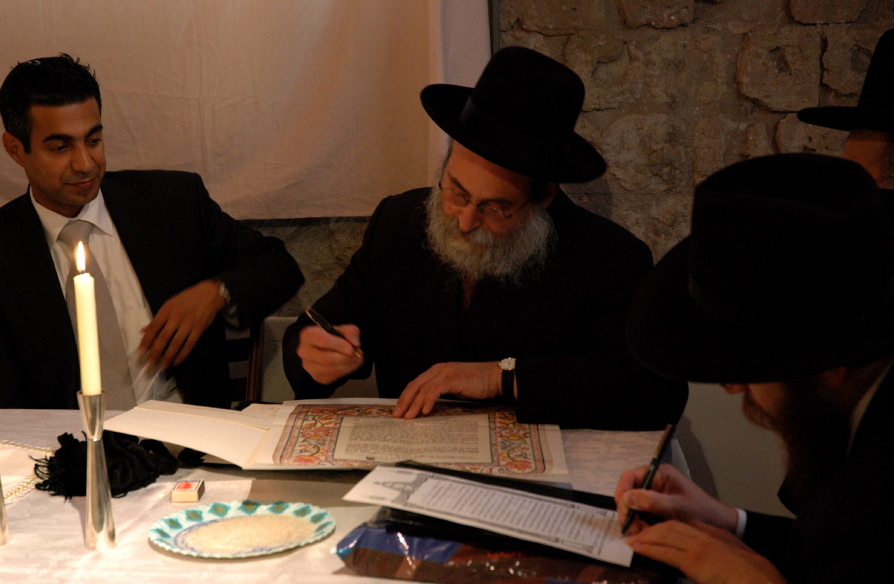
Rabbi filling in the final details of a ketubah

In a traditional Jewish wedding ceremony, the ketubah is signed by two witnesses and traditionally read out loud under the chuppah between the erusin and nissuin. Friends or distant relatives are invited to witness the ketubah, which is considered an honour; close relatives are prohibited from being witnesses. The witnesses must be halakhically valid witnesses, and so cannot be a blood relative of the couple. In Orthodox Judaism, women are also not considered to be valid witnesses. The ketubah is handed to the bride (or, more commonly, to the bride's mother) for safekeeping.

=== Display ===
Ketubot are often hung prominently in the home by the married couple as a daily reminder of their vows and responsibilities to each other.

However, in some communities, the ketubah is either displayed in the private wing of the home or not displayed at all. Various reasons given for this include the fact that the details specify personal details, prominent display may invite jealousy or fears of the evil eye. Historically, the ketubah specified whether the bride was a virgin. In Sephardic communities, it still specifies the actual contributions of the family to the new household and the divorce settlement; Ashkenazi communities have adopted the custom of having set amounts for all weddings.

=== Conditio sine qua non ===
According to Jewish law, spouses are prohibited from living together if the ketubah has been destroyed, lost, or is otherwise unretrievable. In such case a second ketubah is made up (called a Ketubah De'irkesa), which states in its opening phrase that it comes to substitute a previous ketubah that has been lost.

== Illuminated ketubot ==
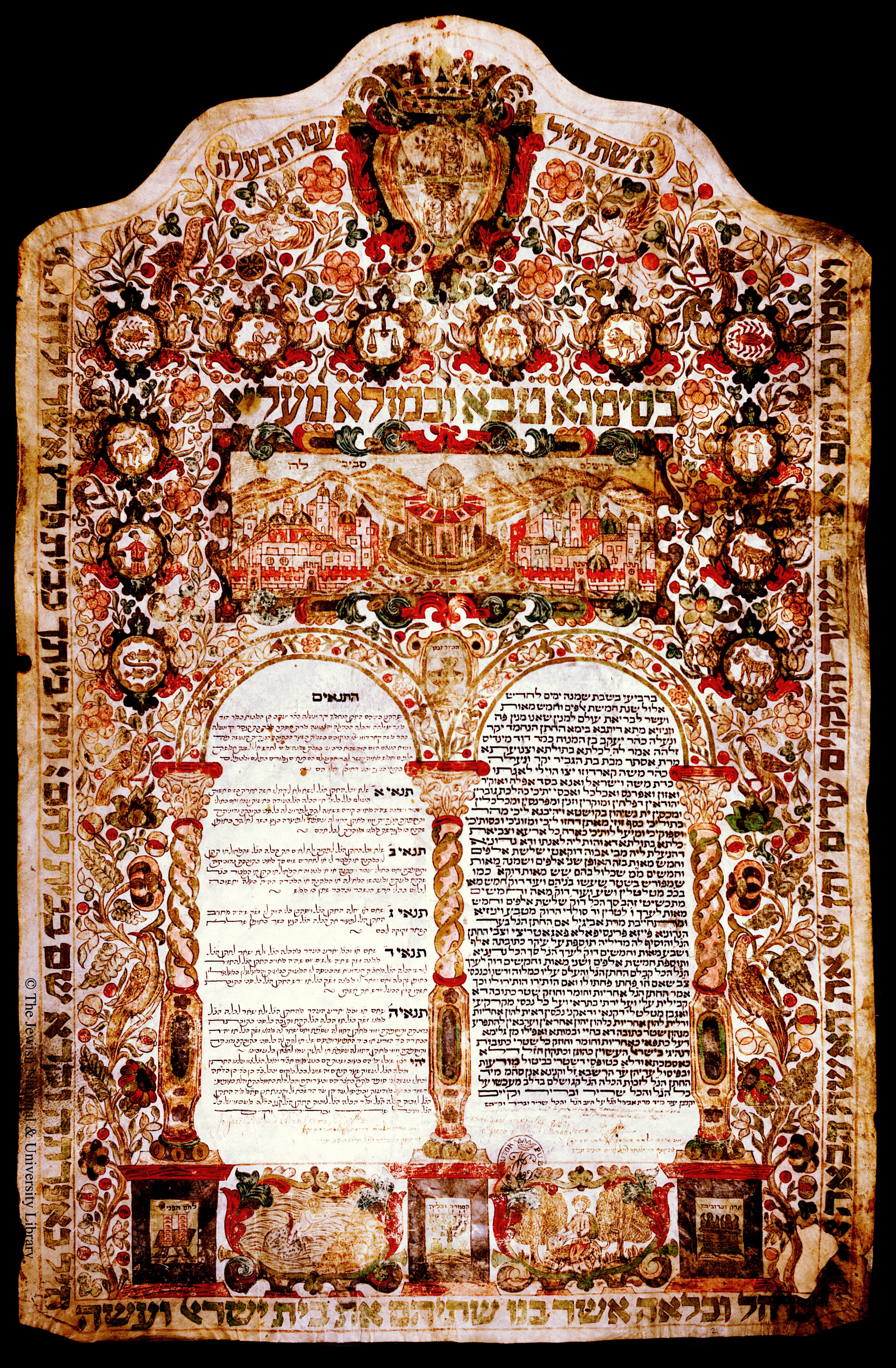
Marriage contract from Venice, Italy, 1750

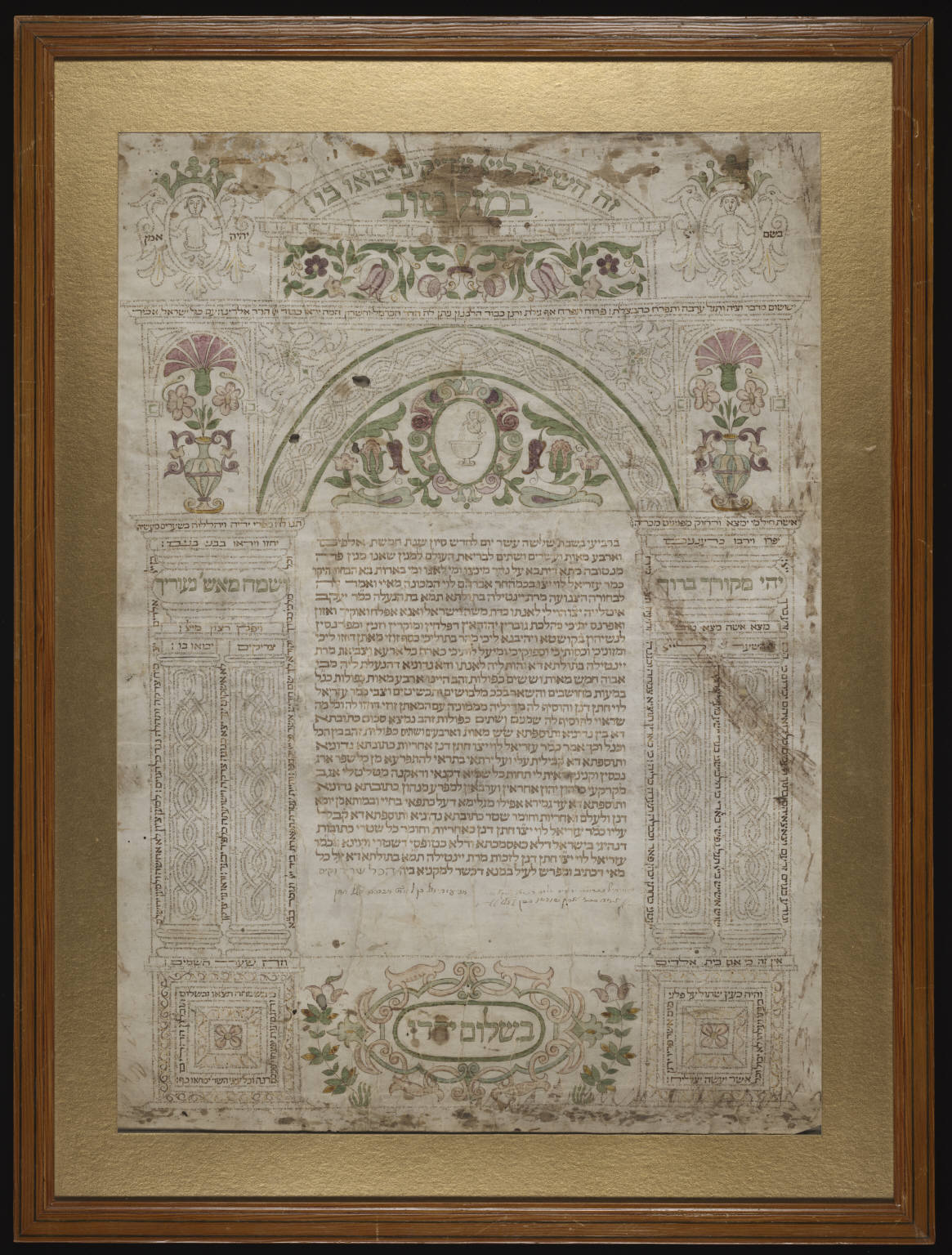

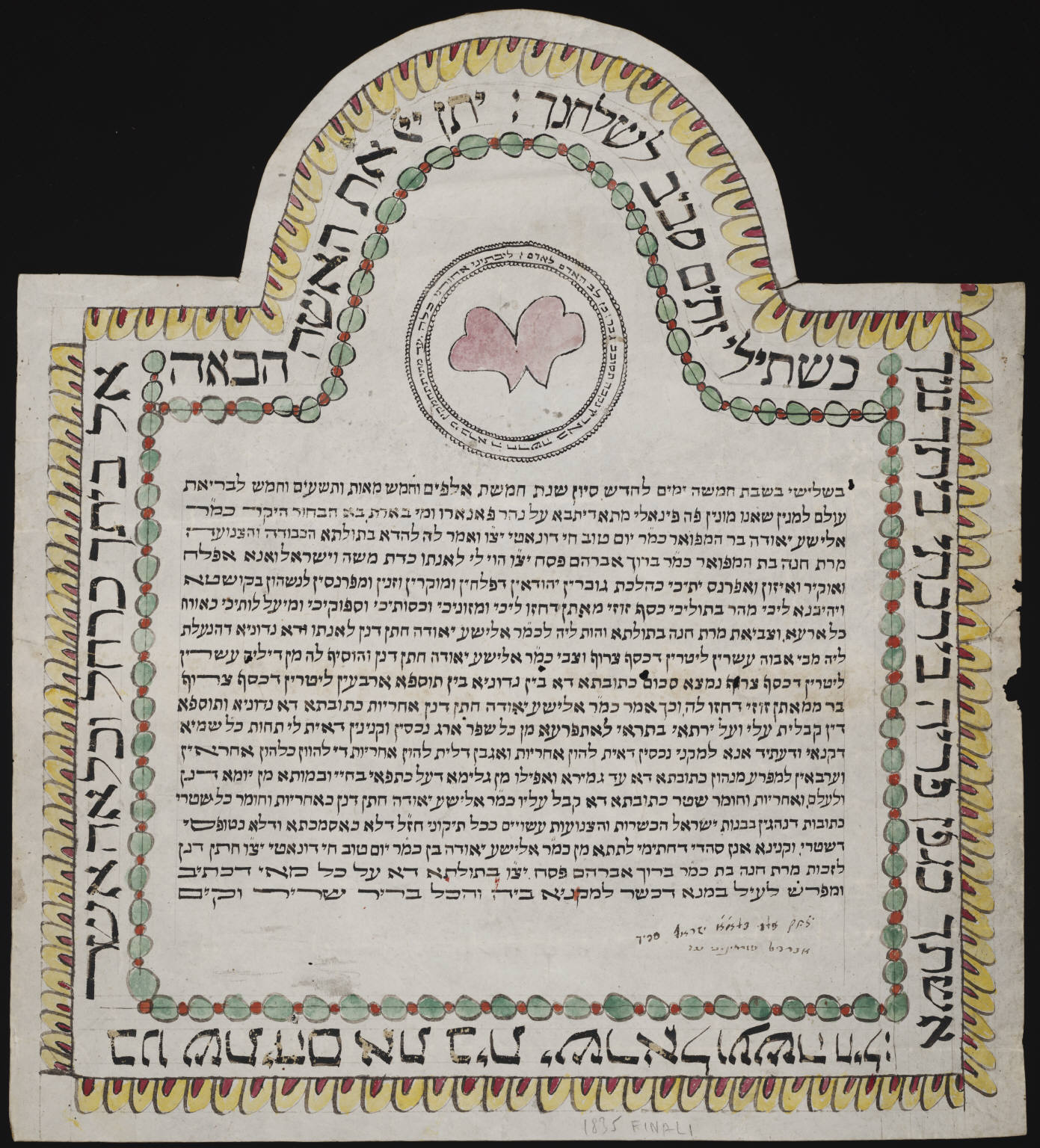

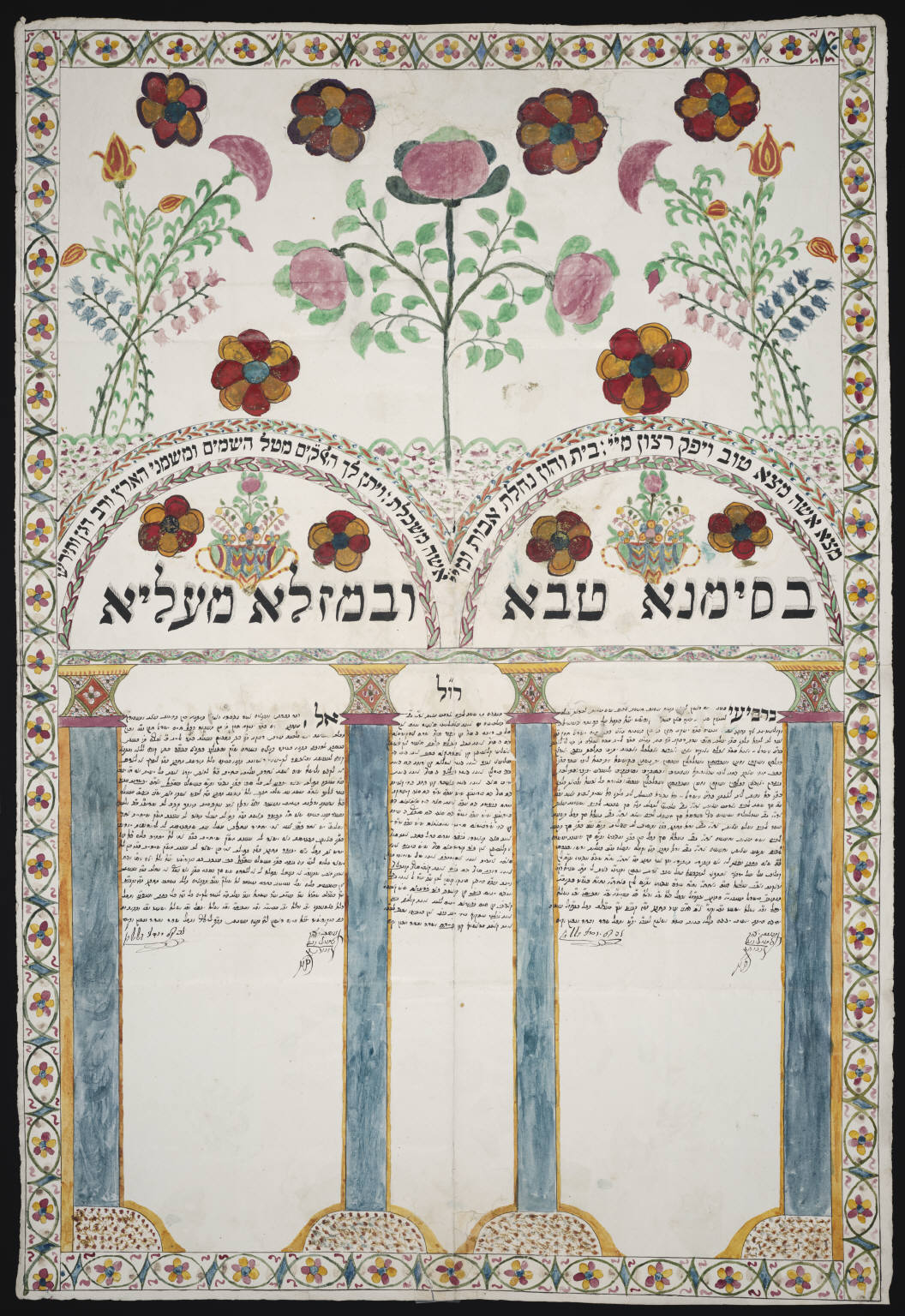

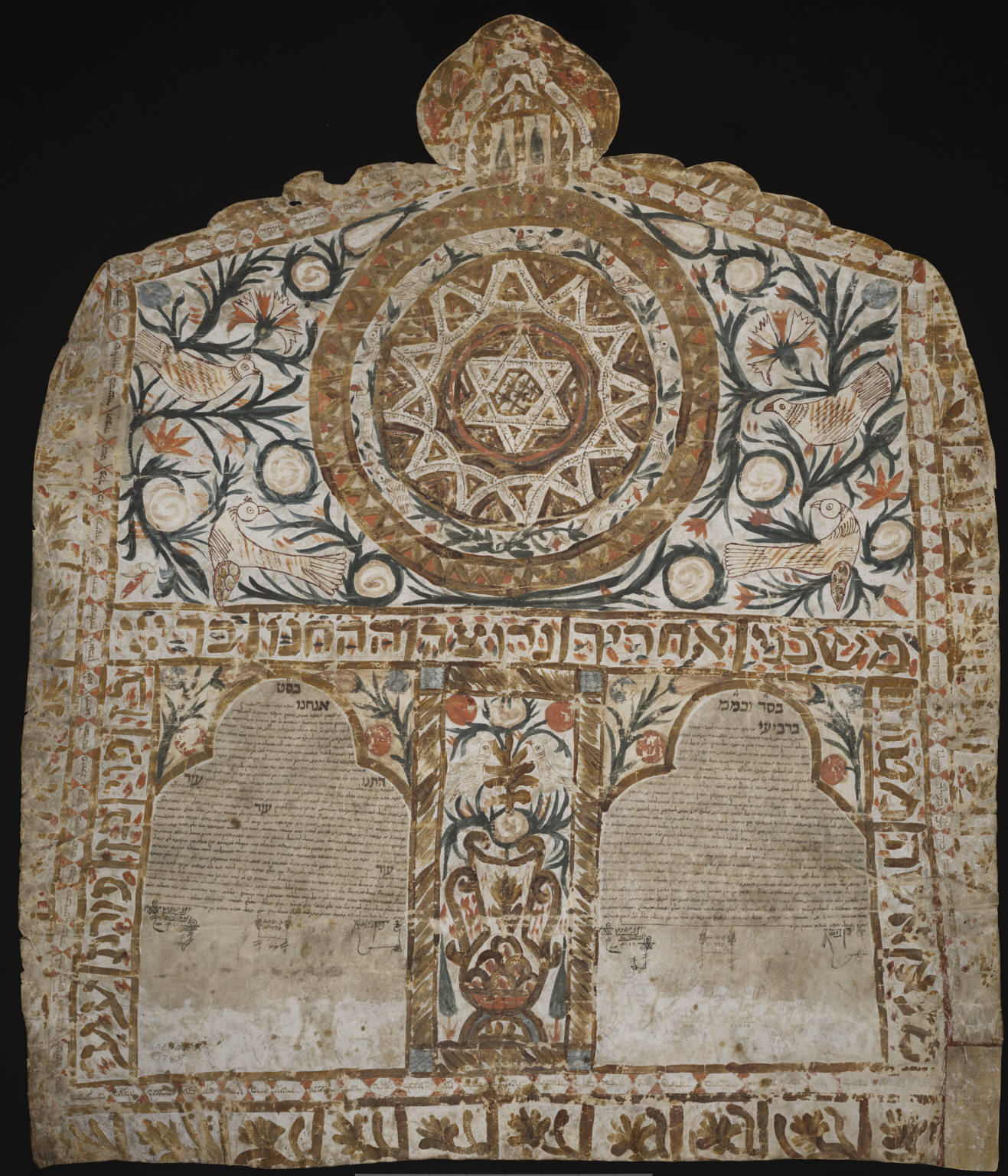

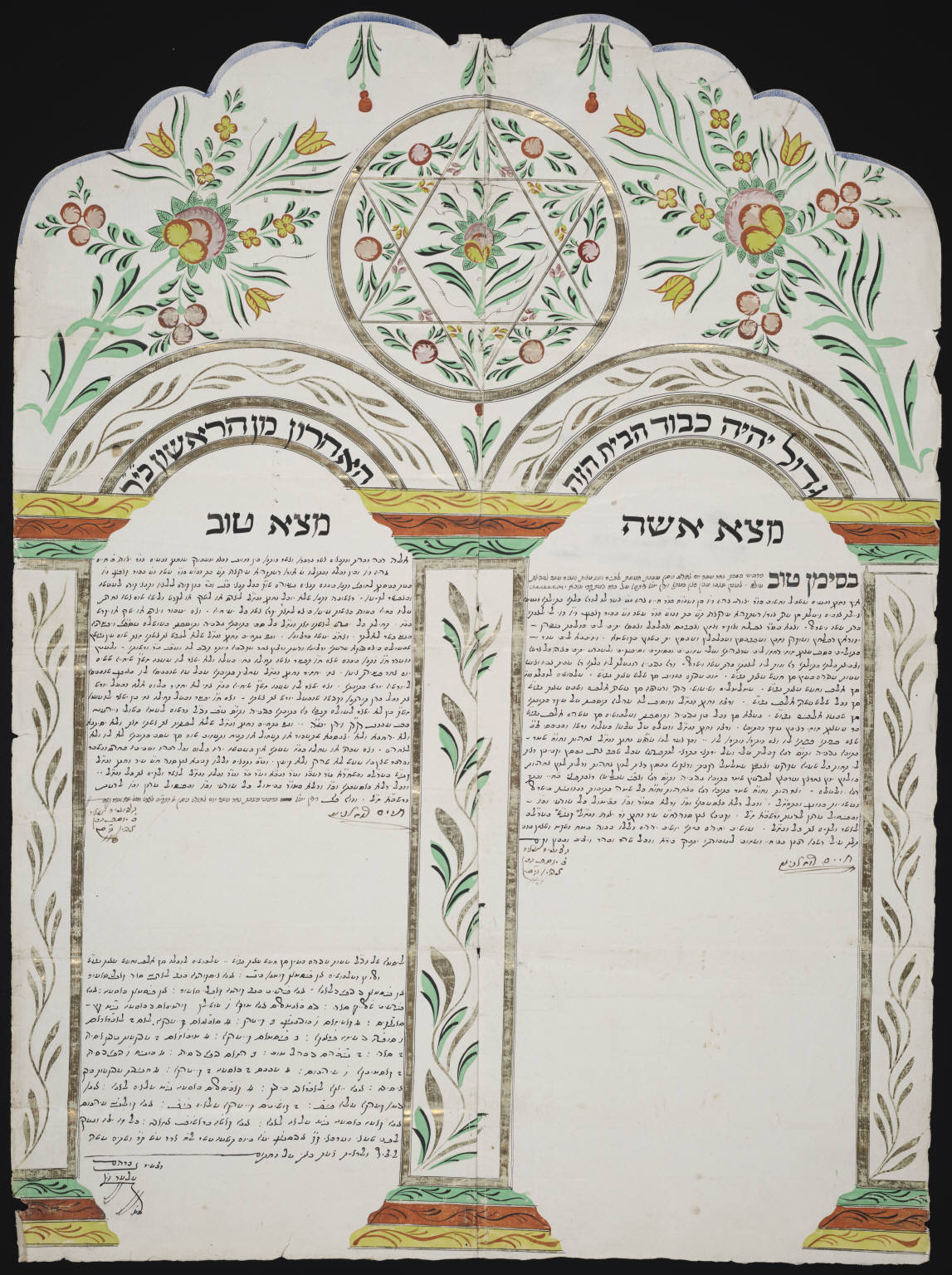

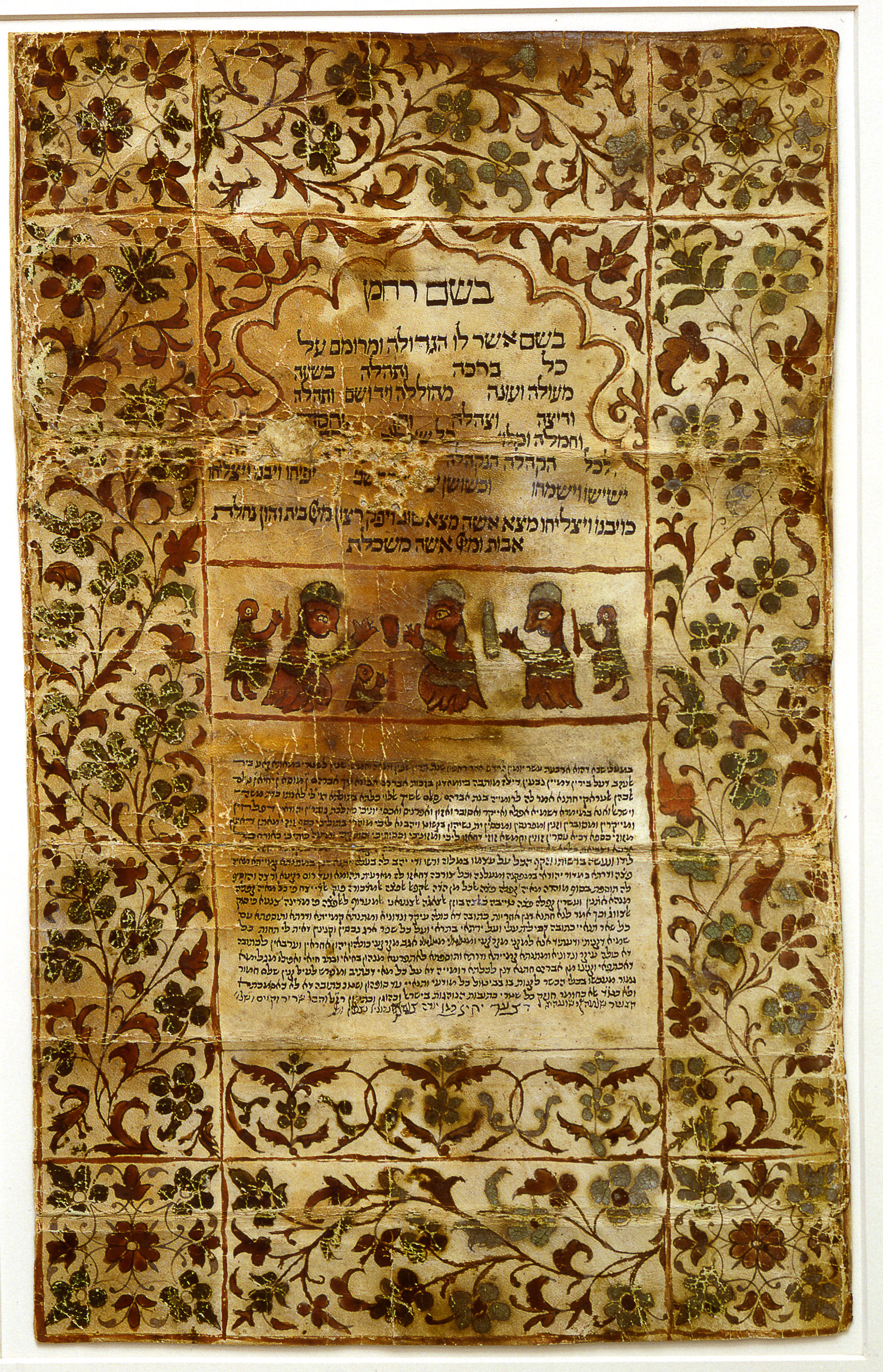
Yemenite Ketubah from 1794, now at the Bezalel Academy of Arts and Design

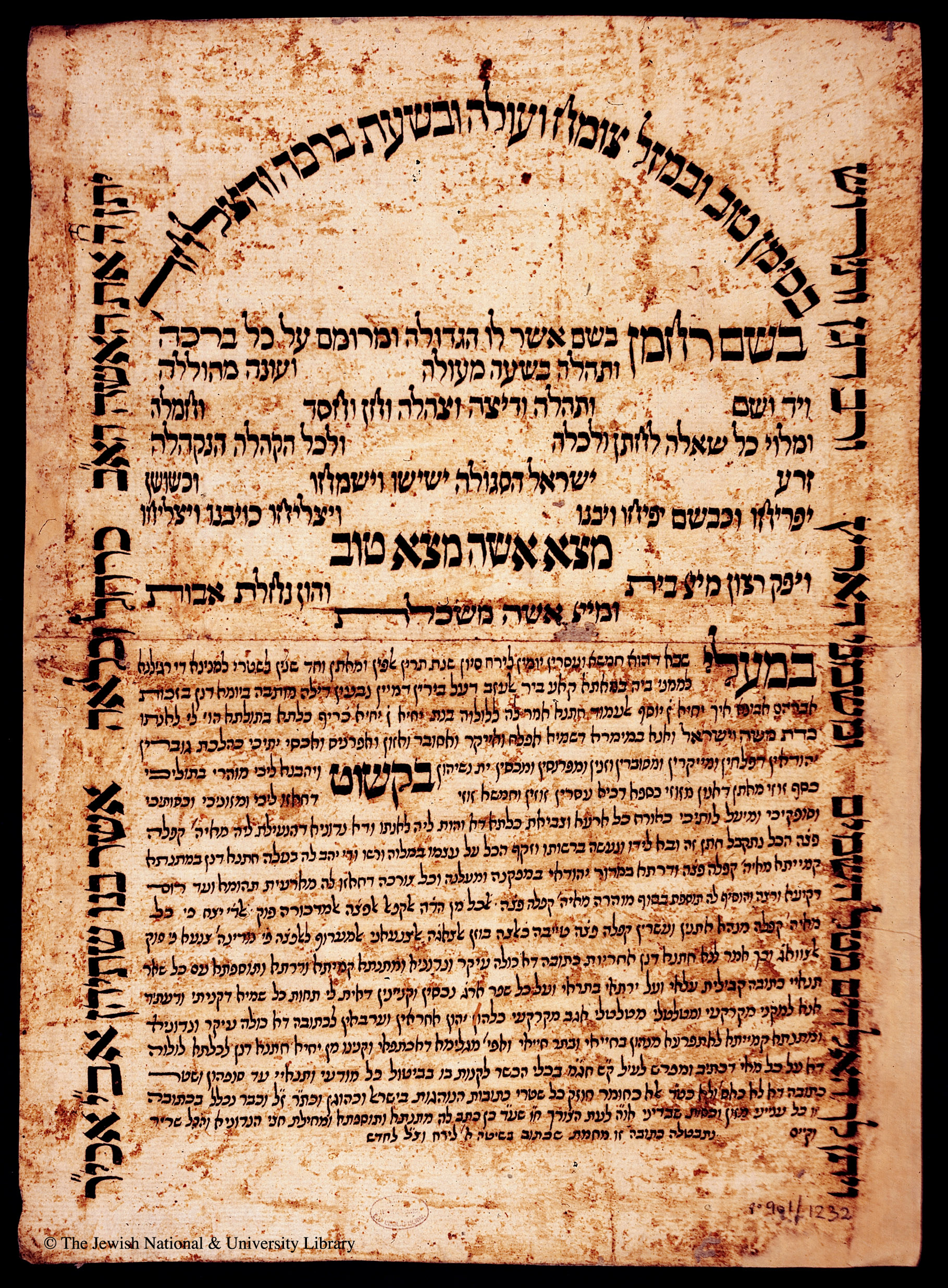
Marriage contract from Yemen, 1890

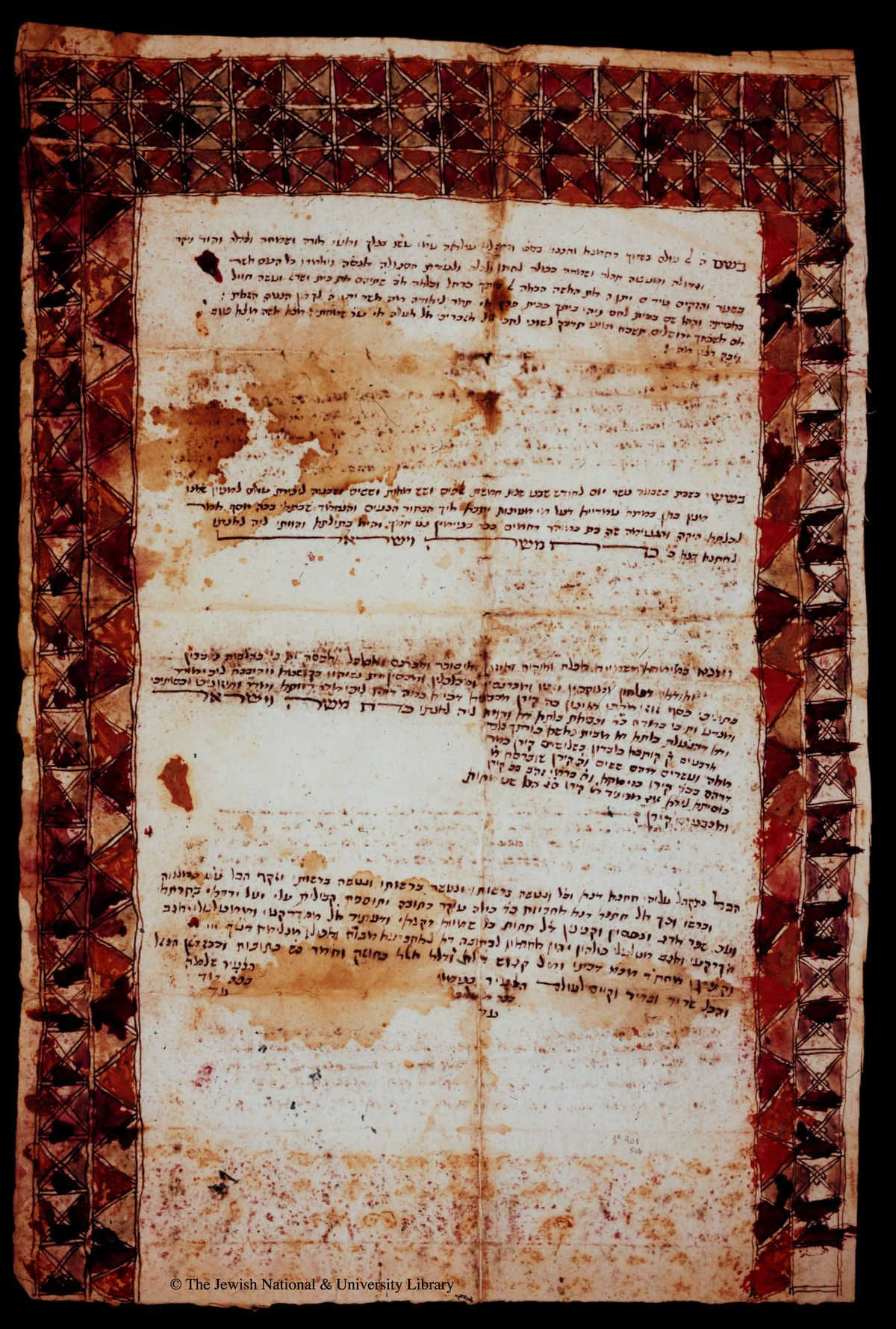
Marriage contract from Iraq

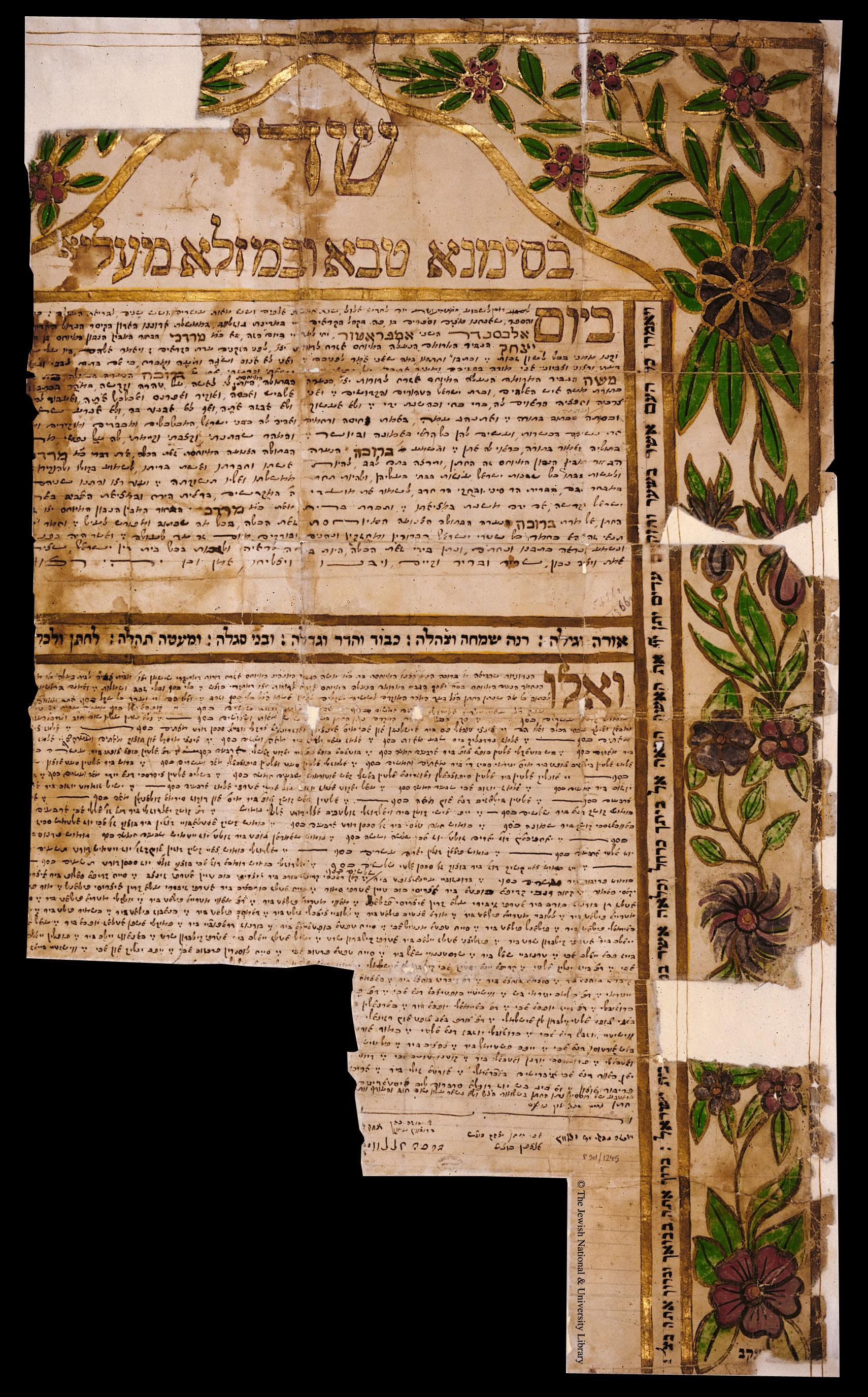
Marriage contract from Ukraine

== See also ==
- Islamic marriage contract
- Quaker wedding
