= Get (divorce document) =

Divorce document in Judaism

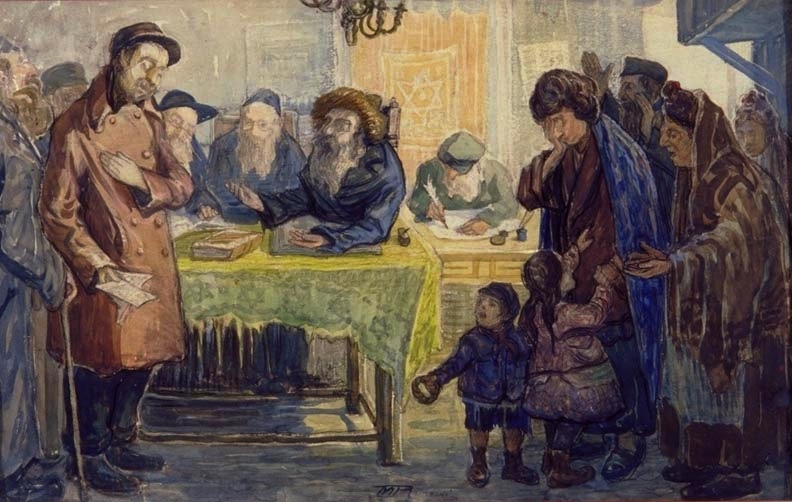
Le Get (The Divorce), painting by Moshe Rynecki, c. 1930.

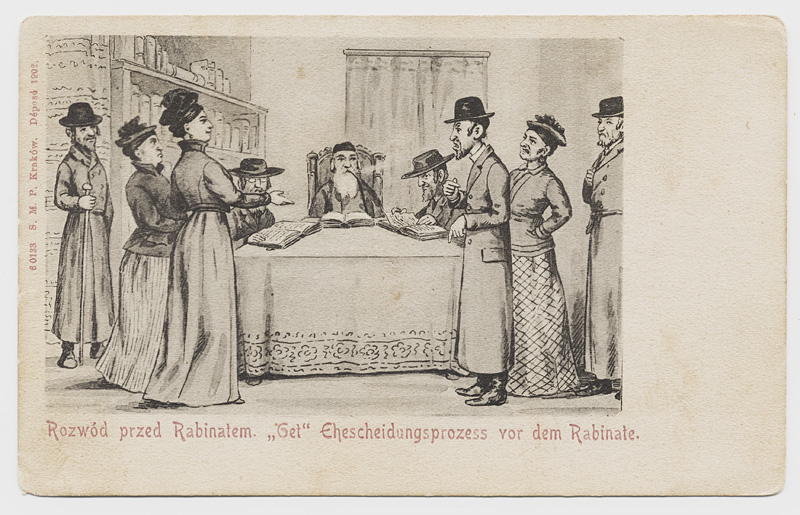
Postcard illustrating a divorce procedure, Jewish Museum of Switzerland

A get, ghet, or gett (/ɡɛt/; Imperial Aramaic: גט, plural gittin גטין) is a document in Jewish religious law which effectuates a divorce between a Jewish couple. The term is also used to refer to the divorce itself. The get is a 12-line document written in Aramaic. The requirements for a get include that the document must be presented by a husband to his wife. The essential part of the get is a very short declaration: "You are hereby permitted to all men." The effect of the get is to free the woman from the marriage, and consequently, she is free to marry another, and that the laws of adultery no longer apply. The get also restores to the wife the legal rights that her husband held over her.

== Etymology ==
The biblical term for the divorce document, described in Deuteronomy 24, is "Sefer Keritot" (Hebrew: ספר כריתות). The word get may have its origins in the Sumerian word for document GID.DA. It appears to have passed from Sumerian into Akkadian as gittu, and from there into Mishnaic Hebrew. In the Mishnah, get can refer to any legal document although it refers primarily to a divorce document. (Tosefet Beracha to Ki Teitzei)

Several popular etymological speculations were offered by early modern Rabbinic authorities. According to Shiltei Giborim, it refers to the stone agate, which purportedly has anti-magnetic property symbolizing the divorce. The Gaon of Vilna posits that the Hebrew letters Gimel and Tet in the word get are the only letters in the Hebrew alphabet that cannot form a word together, again symbolizing the divorce. Baruch Epstein states that it comes from the Latin word actio, meaning "action", which refers to any legal document. Marcus Jastrow posits a Semitic root, arguing that it derives from the Hebrew word for engraving (Hebrew: חטט).

Yechiel Yaakov Weinberg posits that after the Bar Kokhba revolt the Romans decreed that all documents be processed in a Roman court (in order to weaken Jewish nationalism, although it is far more likely that Roman lawmakers were simply following procedure common to all bureaucrats, everywhere, to standardize and simplify their work). The term get may have entered the vernacular during this time.

== Requirements ==
Halakha (Jewish law) requires the following specific formalities for a get to be considered valid:

- A divorce document must be written; this is usually done by a sofer (professional religious scribe) and in the presence of two witnesses. The ceremony is led by a Rabbi known as the mesader gittin and is completed under the guidance of a Beit Din, known as a Jewish court. The get must have been written on the explicit instruction and free-willed approval of the husband, with the specific intention that it is to be used by the husband and his wife. It cannot be initially written with blanks to be filled in later.
- It must be delivered to the wife, whose physical acceptance of the get is required to complete and validate the divorce process. The wife will take the get that has been folded to fit the size of her hands and places it under her arm. She then walks a few steps to solidify the divorce.
- There are certain detailed requirements relating to the legal and religious nature of the get itself. For example:
  - It must be written on a fresh document, and there must be no possibility of cleanly erasing the text.
  - It may not be written on anything attached to the ground (for instance, an attached fig leaf).
  - The get may not be pre-dated.

Any deviation from these requirements invalidates the get and the divorce procedure. In some cases, the get is completely invalid, but in others it is a somewhat valid get that would cause the women to have the status of a "divorcee" prohibited to marry a Kohen, even if she is not considered legally divorced.

A get must be given of the free will of the husband; however, consent of the wife is not biblically mandated (nevertheless, Ashkenazi tradition provides that a husband may not divorce his wife without her consent). A get may not be given out of fear of any obligation either party undertook to fulfill in a separation agreement. As stated in Shulchan Aruch, such an agreement has to provide for matters such as custody of the children and their maintenance, and property settlement before the giving of the get. But either party may withdraw from such an agreement, on the question of the dissolution of the marriage only, if they can satisfy the court of a genuine desire to restore matrimonial harmony. In such a situation all the recognized matrimonial obligations continue to apply. On the other hand, pecuniary conditions stipulated by the parties in the separation agreement would still be valid and enforceable, though the marriage state continues to exist.

== Mesorevet get (get refusal) ==
The laws of gittin only provide for a divorce initiated by the husband. However, the wife has the right to sue for divorce in a rabbinical court. The court, if finding just cause as prescribed in very rare cases in Jewish law, will require the husband to divorce his wife. In such cases, a husband who refused the court's demand that he divorce his wife would be subjected to various penalties in order to pressure him into granting a divorce. Such penalties included fines and corporal punishment; one such measure had the husband spend the night at an unmarked grave (with the implication that it could become his grave). In modern-day Israel, rabbinical courts have the power to sentence a husband to prison to compel him to grant his wife a get. Rabbinical courts outside of Israel do not have power to enforce such penalties. This sometimes leads to a situation in which the husband makes demands of the court and of his wife, demanding a monetary settlement or other benefits, such as child custody, in exchange for the get. Prominent Jewish feminists have fought against such demands in recent decades.

Prominent Orthodox rabbis have pointed to many years of rabbinical sources that state that any coercion (kefiyah) can invalidate a get except in the most extreme of cases, and have spoken out against "get organizations", which they claim have often inflamed situations that could have otherwise been resolved amicably.

Sometimes a man will completely refuse to grant a divorce. This leaves his wife with no possibility of remarriage within Orthodox Judaism. Such a woman is called an agunah (עגונה, "anchored" or "chained" [woman], as in tied down to the previous marriage, thus unable to remarry) or a mesorevet get (literally "refused a get"), if a court determines she is entitled to a divorce. Such a man who refuses to give his wife a get is frequently spurned by Orthodox communities, and excluded from communal religious activities, in an effort to force a get.

While it is widely assumed that the problem lies primarily in men refusing to grant a get to their wives, and that it is a widespread issue, in Israel, figures released from the Chief Rabbinate show that women equally refuse to accept a get and that the numbers are a couple of hundred on each side. While such a husband has the option of seeking a heter meah rabbanim, no similar option exists for the wife. Men can also better afford delays as they lack biological clocks.

In Conservative Judaism a traditional get is required. However, in cases where the husband refuses to grant the get and the bet din (rabbinical court) has ruled that the husband's refusal is not justified, the marriage may be dissolved by hafqa'at kiddushin, or annulment of the marriage. This requires a majority vote of the Joint bet din, comprising nine rabbinic scholars. Upon their authorization of the process, the bet din may issue a certificate of annulment. This procedure is viewed as an extreme option and is only done in cases of dire necessity.

== Agunah ==
The rules governing the get are subject to the civil law of the country, which has precedence over the Jewish marital law.

On the other hand, if a civil divorce is obtained, there is still a need under Jewish law, for the Jewish divorce procedure outlined in this article to be followed if the couple wishes to be considered divorced according to religious Jewish law or to remarry under religious law: i.e., the husband would still need to deliver the get to the wife and the wife to accept it. Otherwise, the couple may be divorced under the civil law ("the law of the land") while still be considered to be married under Jewish law, with all the consequences which follow from that status. It is religiously forbidden for either spouse to remarry without a get. If either spouse has children without acquiring a get and remarrying through Jewish laws, the children conceived by the new couple are considered illegitimate, or mamzerim, which severely disables the child's ability to participate in Jewish life.

== In history ==
One of the most contentious gittin in history was probably the Get of Cleves of the late 18th century, which caused a rift between several rabbinic courts in Western Europe. The case involved a husband who at times exhibited signs of mental illness (in which paranoia was a contributing symptom) who gave his wife a get. As a get can only be given by a "sane" individual, much analysis and debate ensued regarding how to classify this individual as well as the precise definition of insanity in halakha.

In the Middle Ages, a woman could gain the status of a moredet (rebellious wife) and go to the Rabbinic courts to get a divorce. A woman could gain that status through a few means, including refusing to have sexual relations with her husband. However, sometimes doing so would mean she would forfeit her right to her ketubah.

In 2013, the New York divorce coercion gang, a group of rabbis that forced gittin through the use of kidnapping and torture, was closed down by the Federal Bureau of Investigation. A second one that utilized murder was closed in 2016.

In 2024, Orthodox feminist activist and politician Adina Sash called for a mikvah strike in support of Malky Berkowitz, a 29-year-old Orthodox woman whose husband has refused to provide a get for years. The "mikvah strike" involves women refusing to have sex with their husbands during times where sex is considered a mitzvah, such as after women visit the mikvah post-menstruation. The goal, according to Sash, is to pressure men within the Orthodox community to pressure Berkowitz's estranged husband to finally provide the get.

== In popular culture ==
- Rochelle Majer Krich's book Till Death Do Us Part (1992), ISBN 0-380-76533-0.
- In The Sopranos episode "Denial, Anger, Acceptance" (1999), Tony is hired for the purpose of convincing a stubborn Orthodox Jewish man to give a get to the man's wife.
- In the Coen Brothers film A Serious Man (2009) the demand for a get is a recurring plot device.
- The film Gett: The Trial of Viviane Amsalem (2014) shows the process of a Jewish woman trying to obtain a divorce from a reluctant husband.

== See also ==
- Agunah
- Beth din
- Jewish prenuptial agreement
- Jewish views on marriage
- Ketubah
- Lieberman clause (Conservative Judaism)
