= Rachel Kann =

American writer and spoken word poet

- Born: Rachel Kann; San Luis Obispo, California, U.S.
- Origin: Los Angeles, California, U.S.
- Genres: Spoken word; hip hop; electronic
- Occupations: Poet; spoken word artist; writer; actress; dancer; educator; spiritualist
- Years active: 1992–present

Rachel Kann is an American poet, spoken word artist, writer, actress, dancer, educator, and spiritualist. A TEDx UCLA poet, Kann has released three spoken word albums and published four poetry collections, as well as a children's book, You Sparkle Inside. She has performed her work at venues including Walt Disney Concert Hall and Nuyorican Poets Café, and shared the stage with artists including DaKAH, Saul Williams, and Sage Francis.

After gaining notice in theatre and slam poetry circles, Kann founded "collab:ORATION", a collaborative music and poetry open mic which began in 2001 at the Knitting Factory and saw a number of prominent artists participate. Since then, Kann's work has been featured on the podcast Welcome to Night Vale, on KCRW's Morning Becomes Eclectic, and on the website Hevria, where she was a regular contributor. Outside of performance, Kann is an instructor with the UCLA Extension Writers' Program. As a spiritual leader, she was ordained by and affiliated with The Kohenet Institute until cutting ties in 2022, and has led a number of independent religious programs.

Kann is currently pursuing an ethnomusicological research project in Morocco as a Fulbright Scholar for the 2023–2024 academic year.

== Early life ==
Kann grew up in San Luis Obispo, California, born to Jewish atheist parents. Kann has said that she and her siblings were roughly "50 percent of the Jewish population" in their hometown and would later write about her experiences of antisemitism growing up. Her father's family came from Germany and Hungary, while her maternal great-grandparents lived in Vilnius, Lithuania.

As a child, Kann had narcolepsy, initially misdiagnosed as anxiety and treated with sedatives. She was also partially deaf due to an ear infection until an operation when she was four restored her hearing, and has stated her belief that her early deafness heightened her other senses. Kann seriously pursued ballet between the ages of 3 and 17, before shifting her focus to theatre.

Kann attended the UCLA Extension Writers' Program and studied under Tod Goldberg and Rob Roberge; many of the short stories she wrote in their classes later appeared in her book 10 for Everything. Kann later earned a Master of Fine Arts from Antioch University Los Angeles.

== Career ==
Beginning in the late 1990s, Kann was active in the Los Angeles poetry scene. After her early undergrad years, she alternated between Los Angeles and New York, where she gained notice in both the theatre community and the poetry slam circuit.

=== Theatre ===
Kann's early stage roles included an evil stepsister in a 1992 PCPA Theatrefest production of Rodgers and Hammerstein's Cinderella; Anna in a 1999 production of Max Frisch's The Fire Bugs for Eclectic Company Theatre; and appearing in Erik Patterson's award-nominated plays Yellow Flesh/Alabaster Rose (2003) and Red Light Green Light (2004) for the Theatre of NOTE. For her performance in Yellow Flesh/Alabaster Rose, she was named as a Critic's Pick by Jennie Webb for Backstage Magazine.

=== Poetry, music, and spoken word ===
Kann toured with Gary Mex Glazner's SlamAmerica tour in 2000 and Sheila Nicholls' Chicks in Arms tour in 2003, before embarking on a solo cross-country tour in 2004. She won the 2001 Long Beach/Orange County Poetry Slam and was included on the competition's compilation album, The Big Damn Poetry Slam CD, with her poem "The Hollow Cost". She performed her poetry on HBO's Def Poetry Jam, BET's The Way We Do It, and ABC's Eye On L.A..

For a time, Kann stepped back from slam poetry to focus on teaching poetry workshops and hosting literary events. From 2001 to 2008, Kann hosted "collab:ORATION", a collaborative music and poetry open mic event, which began at the Knitting Factory before moving to the Temple Bar in Santa Monica; notable contributors over the years included Sage Francis, Saul Williams, Rachel McKibbens, Emily Wells, and Derrick C. Brown. She also released two spoken word albums around this time, Word to the WHY?s (2002) and ptolemaic complex (2005); the latter was recorded with producers Tack Fu, Michael Gardner, Stephen Davis, and enduser to create what Kann called a "darker, more melodious" sound than her first album. Kann collaborated with DaKAH Hip-Hop Orchestra, being featured on their 2004 live albums San Francisco Debut (recorded at Palace of Fine Arts) and Live At Grand Performances 7/2/04. She released her first poetry film, "Familiar Taste of Blood" featuring enduser, in 2006.

Kann performed in 2010 at Beyond Baroque Literary Arts Center in Los Angeles as part of the poetry showcase Sparring With Beatnik Ghosts, where she appeared alongside poet Michael C. Ford among others.

Her composition "I Know This" was featured as "The Weather" on the podcast Welcome To Night Vale on the 2012 episode "Feral Dogs". Co-creator Jeffrey Cranor selected her for inclusion. She has also been featured on KCRW's Morning Becomes Eclectic. Her second poetry film, "Lie Down Beside You", featuring Tack-Fu and Chaircrusher, was screened at the 2012 Landlocked Film Festival. She appeared at TEDx UCLA, where she performed her poem "Prayer".

In April 2014, Kann performed at the Pico Union Project's second annual Downtown Seder, a pre-Passover event organized by musician Craig Taubman; the event was held at the former Welsh Presbyterian Church building in the Pico-Union area and also featured performances by Danielle Agami's Ate9 dANCEcOMPANY troupe, IKAR musical director Cantor Hillel Tigay, and an unscripted appearance by actor and folk musician Theodore Bikel.

Kann collaborated with producer Jaz 1 for her third album, The Upward Spiral, released in 2015. One composition from the album, "Drunk", won Best Sound/Music in a Production at that year's Rabbit Heart Poetry Film Festival. In May, Kann returned to her hometown of San Luis Obispo for a pair of free shows, where she was accompanied by the a capella group Beautiful Chorus. In January 2016, she performed with the hip-hop group Darshan at a Hevria-hosted event at Pico Shul in Los Angeles.

In 2017, she performed at a Mardi Gras Grand Bal Masque at the Bootleg Theater in Los Angeles, hosted by comedian Al Madrigal, on a bill including actor Roger Guenveur Smith; and at Ralph's Rock Diner in Worcester, Massachusetts, as part of the Dirty Gerund Poetry Series. She was again awarded at that year's Rabbit Heart Poetry Film Festival, this time Best Overall Film and Best Sound/Music for her poetry film "Dancing Lesson".

To coincide with the release of her children's book, You Sparkle Inside, in 2018, Kann released a single of the same name, a spoken word reading of the book accompanied by guitarist Brock Pollock.

Kann released The Quickening in 2019, an EP and "visual album" with a video component released on YouTube.

Kann is currently pursuing an ethnomusicological research study in Morocco as a Fulbright Scholar for the 2023–2024 academic year. The project involves analysis of a collection (Romancero) of songs in Haketia written and sung by Sephardic women in Northern Morocco. Kann plans to write a poetry collection informed by this analysis and by observation of women in the local Sephardic community. A selection of these poems and songs is then planned to be presented live, in an effort to preserve interest in the culture and history of this dwindling community.

=== Published writing ===
Kann has published four poetry collections: Idolizer/Atrix (2000), 10 for Everything (2007), A Prayer On Behalf Of The Broken Heart (2017), and How to Bless the New Moon: The Priestess Paths Cycle and Other Poems for Queens (2019). She has also been featured in collections edited by poets like Alix Olson and Suzanne Lummis.

In 2013, Kann's short story "The Historian" was adapted into a play for the Santa Monica Repertory Theater's Wave Fest, directed by Jennifer Bloom and starring Joe Hernandez-Kolski. Kann was a regular contributor to Hevria from 2014 to 2020, publishing many poems, essays, and spiritual writings there. She returned to the Bootleg Theater in 2017 for "Write Club Chapter 63: Better Off Fed", a competitive writing event co-hosted by actor Justin Welborn.

Kann's first children's book, You Sparkle Inside, was created with illustrator Rin Colabucci and published in 2018 by Orange Ocean Press. The book was launched at RuPaul's DragCon LA, where it was featured in a Drag Queen Story Hour hosted by Mrs. Kasha Davis.

=== Podcasts ===
Kann is a fan of podcasting, describing it as "one of my favorite media". Beginning in 2005, Kann regularly appeared on filmmaker Richard Bluestein's podcast Yeast Radio, portraying a fictionalized parody of herself that interacted with Bluestein's Madge Weinstein character. She has also been featured on HevriaCast, hosted by Elad Nehorai, and on Hipsid with Rabbi Simcha, hosted by Rabbi Simcha Weinstein. Kann also hosted her own podcast, Out with Rachel, between 2017 and 2018, via Rabbis Brad Hirschfield and Irwin Kula's The Wisdom Daily website.

=== Spiritual leadership ===
A graduate of The Kohenet Institute, Kann was an ordained kohenet in the states of California and New York, in addition to being a kohen by ancestry. She has overseen programs including "New Moon Union", a monthly multimedia celebration of Rosh Chodesh, and "Realize Paradise: Shabbat Soul Journey", a weekly virtual Shabbat service that incorporates meditation, chanting, drumming, land acknowledgement, invocation of the shekhinah, and Hebrew prayers rewritten with feminine grammatical gender. Kann was featured as an expert on Hebrew Shamanism at the 2021 Jewish Psychedelic Summit, and completed an apprenticeship in medicine work in a Shipibo lineage.

In late 2022, Kann disaffiliated from The Kohenet Institute after learning of misconduct within the organization.

=== Other work ===
Kann spoke at a 2015 conference entitled "SoCal Sessions: Catalyzing Creative Consciousness" alongside Rabbi Tzvi Freeman and screenwriters David N. Weiss and David Sacks. Later that year, her artwork was featured at the opening of Big Art Church, a performance venue in East Hollywood, alongside the work of artists including Amanda Sage and William Stout.

Since 2006, Kann has taught poetry and fiction workshops through the UCLA Extension Writers' Program, where she was awarded Outstanding Instructor of the Year in 2017. She is also a fitness and Zumba instructor.

== Personal life ==
Raised without religion, Kann began rediscovering her Jewish heritage as an adult, inspired by the writing of Rabbi Aryeh Kaplan and Rebbe Nachman of Breslov and by fellow poet Rick Lupert asking her to contribute to A Poet's Hagaddah, the latter of which she said "parted my Red Sea". Jewishness has since become a major theme of her work, with Kann saying in 2015: "I suppose the reason my Judaism is more front and center in my poetry is because it's more front and center in my life. [...] I've always been a mystic, and mysticism has always played a huge part in my poetry, and now, it's just more...Jewish."

On the subject of God, Kann has written that she "can't remember ever not believing in G-d", but expressed gratitude to her atheist parents for giving her "lots of healthy skepticism and distrust of organized religion in general", and described herself as a "panentheist" - "everything exists within G-d".

She is a Libra and owns a blind dog named Pearl.

Kann has referenced depression and attention deficit hyperactivity disorder in her art, describing herself as having a "suicide gene" and suggesting that "ADD-doused hyperactivity" caused her childhood deafness to go undiagnosed.

In a 2016 Hevria article, Kann wrote about being raped while rescuing a friend from an abusive relationship in another country, saying she had rationalized the experience until discussing it with an ex-boyfriend a few years prior.

Kann has been noted as a personal influence of poet Tiffany Dawn Hasse and a "dear friend" of musician and minister Amy Steinberg, who convinced Kann to start writing poetry.

== Awards and accolades ==
- 2023-2024 Fulbright U.S. Scholar for Morocco
- 2019 WORD: Bruce Geller Memorial Prize
- 2017 Asylum Arts Reciprocity Fellow
- 2017 Outstanding Instructor of the Year at UCLA Extension Writers' Program
- 2007 James Kirkwood Fiction Award (short story)
- 2006 Writer's Digest Short-Short Story Awards (micro-fiction)
- 2004 LA Weekly Awards (best supporting actress)
- 2004 Backstage West Garland Awards Critic's Picks (best supporting actress)

== Bibliography ==
=== Poetry collections ===
- Idolizer/Atrix (2000; Re:Press)
- 10 for Everything (2007; Sybaritic Press)
- A Prayer On Behalf Of The Broken Heart (2017; Finishing Line Press)
- How to Bless the New Moon: The Priestess Paths Cycle and Other Poems for Queens (2019; Ben Yehuda Press)

=== Children's books ===
- You Sparkle Inside (2018; Orange Ocean Press)

=== Short stories ===
- "Tumble" (2010)

=== Compilation appearances ===
- 2003: So Luminous the Wildflowers: An Anthology of California Poets ("Pretty Talk")
- 2006: Blue Arc West: An Anthology of California Poets ("Free, Fall")
- 2007: Alix Olson, Word Warriors: 35 Women Leaders in the Spoken Word Revolution ("Montaña De Oro", "Titular")
- 2008: Rick Lupert, A Poet's Haggadah: Passover Through The Eyes Of Poets ("dayeinu")
- 2011: Knocking at the Door: Poems about Approaching the Other
- 2015: Suzanne Lummis, Master Class: The Poetry Mystique ("Special")
- 2021: Linda Ravenswood, X LA Poets ("Roses and Thunder", "The Most Unkindest Cut of All", "Jellyfish Dance of the Ten Infinities", "Kindness / The Murmuration of Starlings", "I Surrender")
- 2022: Stephen Gray, How Psychedelics Can Help Save the World

== Discography ==
=== Albums ===
- Word to the WHY?s (2002)
- ptolemaic complex (2005)
- The Upward Spiral (prod. Jaz 1) (2015)

=== EPs ===
- The Quickening (2019; also billed as a "visual album" with a film component released on YouTube)

=== Singles ===
- 2018: "You Sparkle Inside" (ft. Brock Pollock)

=== Poetry films ===
Year	Title	Director	Notes
2006	"Familiar Taste of Blood" (ft. enduser)	Edward Farleigh	Later appeared on enduser's 2018 album deliberate brakes
2012	"Lie Down Beside You" (ft. Tack-Fu & Chaircrusher)	Bradford L. Cooper	Official 2012 selection at Landlocked Film Festival and 4 The Camera Dance Film Festival
2015	"Drunk" (ft. Jaz 1)	Rahat Mahajan	Winner: Best Sound/Music in a Production, finalist for Best Valentine and Best Overall Production at 2015 Rabbit Heart Poetry Festival; Later included on The Upward Spiral
2016	"Mermaid Esther: An Astonishing Fire"	Bradford L. Cooper	Excerpt from The Quickening; Curator's Choice and Shortlist: Rabbit Heart Poetry Film Festival
2017	"What to Tell The Children"	Rahat Mahajan	Music composed by Dave Lewis
2017	"Drunk" (ft. Jaz 1) (Purim 2017 Edition)	Rahat Mahajan	
2017	"I See You"	Jeffrey Bomberger	Music composed by Dave Lewis
2017	"Dancing Lesson (or how to let the words leave you)"	Bradford L. Cooper	Excerpt from The Quickening; Best Overall Production, Best Sound/Music and Curator's Choice: Rabbit Heart Poetry Film Festival 2017
2018	"Another Star/Another Queen (A Purim Poem)"	Bradford L. Cooper	Performance piece on Vashti; Excerpt from The Quickening
2018	"Rock The Bells" (ft. Hillel Smith)	Bradford L. Cooper	World Premiere: 10/20/18 Rabbit Heart Poetry Film Festival; Excerpt from The Quickening
2018	"New Style Inauguration"	Bradford L. Cooper	Excerpt from The Quickening
2019	"Burn This" (ft. Laura Escudé)	Bradford L. Cooper	Excerpt from The Quickening
2019	The Quickening	Bradford L. Cooper	Visual adaptation of EP of the same name

=== Compilation appearances ===
- 2001: The Big Damn Poetry Slam CD ("The Hollow Cost")
