= Jewish feminism =

Jewish feminism is a movement that seeks to make the religious, legal, and social status of Jewish women equal to that of Jewish men in Judaism. Feminist movements, with varying approaches and successes, have opened up within all major branches of the Jewish religion.

In its modern form, the Jewish feminist movement can be traced to the early 1970s in the United States. According to Judith Plaskow, the main grievances of early Jewish feminists were women's exclusion from the all-male prayer group or minyan, women's exemption from positive time-bound mitzvot (mitzvot meaning the 613 commandments given in the Torah at Mount Sinai and the seven rabbinic commandments instituted later, for a total of 620), and women's inability to function as witnesses and to initiate divorce in Jewish religious courts.

According to historian Paula Hyman, two articles published in the 1970s were trailblazers in analyzing the status of Jewish women using feminism: "The Unfreedom of Jewish Women", published in 1970 in the Jewish Spectator by its editor, Trude Weiss-Rosmarin, and an article by Rachel Adler, then an Orthodox Jew and currently a professor at the Reform seminary Hebrew Union College – Jewish Institute of Religion, called "The Jew Who Wasn't There: Halacha and the Jewish Woman", published in 1971 in Davka. Also, in 1973, the first [American] National Jewish Women's Conference was held, in New York City; Blu Greenberg gave its opening address.

== Jewish feminist theology ==
There are many variations of feminist theology within Jewish communities, and it has not been formalized. In general, Jewish feminist theology considers "central Jewish categories, themes, and modes of expression." Ronit Irshai noted "one of the most conspicuous attributes of Jewish feminist theology is the belief, held by most of its advocates, that the repair can come from within, and that the main effort is to propose a theological structure that does so."

The feminist theological movement originated in the secular feminism of the 1960s and 1970s. An early theological topic to be discussed, starting in the 1970s, was God language. In 1979, Rita Gross published her previously circulating article arguing that the Jewish lack of female imagery for God is the "ultimate symbol of the degradation of Jewish women." Judith Plaskow explained this by positing that the hierarchal relationship between God and humanity, along with the masculine terms used for God and feminine for humanity, led to a "causal connection between the conception of God and the patriarchal social structure." Plaskow called for a new religious language, including female "God-talk," which included creating a new religious memory, ceremonies, liturgy, and Midrash that could lead to new conceptions of the divine. A contrasting immanent theological theory, expressed by Tamar Ross, is that of "cumulative revelation," which claims revelation is "an ongoing and cumulative process, a gradual and dynamic development of the original Torah, such that the Torah’s ultimate meaning is revealed only over the course of time," that adds to knowledge.

A major inspiration for many Jewish feminist theologians was Raphael Patai's book The Hebrew Goddess, which contributed to knowledge about Jewish conceptions of a feminist divine in ancient and medieval tradition.

In 1976, Naomi Janowitz and Margaret Wenig, then undergraduates at Brown University, expressed this concept by writing Siddur Nashim. Later liturgists have further experimented with female God language. They use terms like Shekhinah, a feminine aspect of Judaism taken from mysticism, Rahmana, meaning "mother of wombs," "Yah," and "ein hahayim." Jewish feminist theology also considers female or gender-neutral metaphors for God. Neil Gillman notes that Jewish feminists, "reject... the king metaphor because of its hierarchical associations, and the paternal metaphor because it excludes their distinctive female experience. The world has changed, and so must our divine images."

By the 1990s, the Reform and Reconstructionist movements included feminist liturgy and God language in their siddurim. The Jewish Renewal movement uses Shekhinah to identify God.

There are other methods of Jewish feminist considerations of God's gender. There is a growing subfield in the study of gender and Judaism, which sees the binaries of male and female as crucial constructs in Jewish thought. For example, Sara Yehudit Schneider "does insist that God has a dual nature of male and female that ideally should be equal and should be united. Another perspective can be seen through Joy Ladin's transgender theology, which considers a God who "cannot be comprehended in gender binary terms" and who can be more deeply understood using trans language. An alternative feminist theology can be seen in the Kohenet movement, which “conceives of God/dess as a unity” in an earth-based context.

Jewish feminist theology also considers the relationship between halakha and theology. Philosophers such as Rachel Adler, Ronit Irshai, and Blu Greenberg consider halakha and their interaction with how the perception of God influences culture. This idea is further explored by Akedah Theology, which "associates obedience to the divine imperative embodied in Halakhah with the binding up (Hebrew akedah, referring to the Binding of Isaac, Gen 22:1–19) of all our specifically human inclinations, desires, and needs, including our moral principles."

== Feminist impact on liturgy and ritual ==
In 1854, Fanny Neuda wrote the first Jewish prayer book known to have been written by a woman for women, called Hours of Devotion; it was translated into English and published in the United States 12 years later. In 2015 a plaque honoring her was unveiled in Loštice, where she lived while her husband was a rabbi there.

In 1946, the new Silverman siddur of Conservative Judaism changed the traditional words of Birkot Hashachar of thanking God for "not making me a woman", instead using words thanking God for "making me a free person".

Feminist Judaism has also led to many communities adding the imahot, or matriarchs, to the Amidah and other prayers mentioning their male counterparts. According to Eric Caplan, this began in individual communities and spread through gatherings of the Chavurah movement.

Contemporary liturgists such as Marcia Falk have also written liturgy that introduce feminist concepts.

In the early 1970s, new rituals began popularizing. Jewish women staged public ceremonies for the birth of their daughters, sharing the ritual of "brit millah" which was historically reserved for newborn sons. They started forming special groups for prayer and study on Rosh Hodesh, the beginning of the new month, with their newfound freedoms to congregate.

In 1976, the first women-only Passover seder was held in Esther M. Broner's New York City apartment and led by her, with 13 women attending, including Gloria Steinem, Letty Cottin Pogrebin, and Phyllis Chesler. Esther Broner and Naomi Nimrod created a women's Haggadah for use at this seder. In the spring of 1976 Esther Broner published this "Women's Haggadah" in Ms. magazine, later publishing it as a book in 1994; this Haggadah is meant to include women where only men had been mentioned in traditional Haggadahs, and it features the Wise Women, the Four Daughters, the Women's Questions, the Women's Plagues, and a women-centric "Dayenu". The original Women's Seder has been held with the Women's Haggadah every year since 1976, and women-only seders are now held by some congregations as well.

Some seders (including the original Women's Seder, but not limited to women-only seders) now set out a cup for the prophet Miriam as well as the traditional cup for the prophet Elijah, sometimes accompanied by a ritual to honor Miriam. Miriam's cup originated in the 1980s in a Boston Rosh Chodesh group; it was invented by Stephanie Loo, who filled it with mayim hayim (living waters) and used it in a feminist ceremony of guided meditation. Miriam's cup is linked to the midrash of Miriam's well, which "is a rabbinic legend that tells of a miraculous well that accompanied the Israelites during their 40 years in the desert at the Exodus from Egypt".

Furthermore, some Jews include an orange on the seder plate. The orange represents the fruitfulness for all Jews when all marginalized peoples are included, particularly women and gay people. An incorrect but common rumor says that this tradition began when a man told Susannah Heschel that a woman belongs on the bimah as an orange on the seder plate; however, it actually began when in the early 1980s, while when speaking at Oberlin College Hillel, Susannah Heschel was introduced to an early feminist Haggadah that suggested adding a crust of bread on the seder plate, as a sign of solidarity with Jewish lesbians (as some would say there's as much room for a lesbian in Judaism as there is for a crust of bread on the seder plate). Heschel felt that to put bread on the seder plate would be to accept that Jewish lesbians and gay men violate Judaism like chametz violates Passover. So, at her next seder, she chose an orange as a symbol of inclusion of gays and lesbians and others who are marginalized within the Jewish community. In addition, each orange segment had a few seeds that had to be spit out—a gesture of spitting out and repudiating the homophobia of traditional Judaism.

== Orthodox Judaism ==
The position on feminism within the Orthodox denomination of Judaism is broadly divided along the factional lines of the modern Orthodox and Haredi communities, with the modern Orthodox favourable to certain advances for women, provided they are maintained within the framework of Jewish law (halakha). Haredi Judaism maintains a stricter stance on issues pertaining to feminism.

=== Modern Orthodox approaches ===
Orthodox feminism works within the halakhic system and works with rabbis and rabbinical institutions to create more inclusive practices within Orthodox communal life and leadership. Orthodox feminism tends to focus on issues, such as the problems of agunah, fostering women's education, leadership, and ritual participation, women's leadership and making synagogue more women-friendly. Unlike other denominations, Orthodox feminists retain the partition in synagogue and do not count women in a minyan. The all-women's prayer group—Women's Tefilla Group, is an Orthodox practice that began in the 1970s and continues today.

Educational opportunities have drastically increased for Orthodox women since the late twentieth century. It was common for only boys and men to study the Talmud and Jewish law but this has now been extended and is standard for girls. The Drisha Institute for Jewish Education was the first institution that gave women access to Talmudic study on an advanced level and gave training in halakha that was only previously accessible to men. In today's time, several institutions have joined Drisha and now offer women the opportunity to learn. Orthodox Jewish women now also have access to leadership roles as clergy and advisors on Jewish law. New educational programs have enabled Modern Orthodox women to study Talmud and other rabbinic literature, at levels intended to be comparable to a yeshivah or kollel for men, including Drisha Institute (founded in 1979), Pardes Institute of Jewish Studies, and Matan Women's Institute for Torah Studies.

Blu Greenberg has a large impact on orthodox women's view of feminism. She encouraged women to take on new leadership roles while still abiding by the Jewish law in her book “On Women and Judaism” which was published in 1981. Greenberg was named the “foremother” of Orthodox Jewish feminism. In 1997, Blu Greenberg founded the Jewish Orthodox Feminist Alliance (JOFA) to advocate for women's increased participation and leadership in Modern Orthodox Jewish life and to create a community for women and men dedicated to such change. JOFA has focused on issues including agunah, bat mitzvah, women's scholarship, women's prayer, ritual, women's synagogue leadership, and women's religious leadership. The organization has a mission statement of “advocates for expanding women’s rights and opportunities within the framework of halakha, to build a vibrant and equitable orthodox community.” They seek to be a resource and uplifting to the women in their community while simultaneously encouraging them to follow the ways of orthodox life. JOFA has been able to make multiple important changes and the organization is continuing its efforts to expand and push the barriers of the Orthodox community.

Also in 1997, Gail Billig became the first female president of a major Orthodox synagogue, at Congregation Ahavath Torah in Englewood, New Jersey.

In 2002, the first partnership minyans were established—Shira Hadasha in Jerusalem, and Darkhei Noam in New York City. These are Orthodox communities that maximize women's participation in the prayer to the full extent possible within halakha. Although critics of partnership minyan argue that these are not "Orthodox", the communities themselves vehemently insist that they are Orthodox. The fact that the synagogues have partitions and do not count women as part of the minyan (and thus do not allow women to lead any parts of services that require a quorum) demonstrates the loyalty to Orthodox practice. Dr. Elana Sztokman, former executive director of JOFA, wrote extensively about this phenomenon in her book The Men's Section: Orthodox Jewish Men in an Egalitarian World and examined this dynamic in which the partnership minyan considers itself Orthodox but is often rejected as Orthodox by other members of the community. Today there are over 35 partnership minyans around the world.

Another major historical event of Orthodox feminism occurred in 2009 when Rabba Sara Hurwitz became the first publicly ordained Orthodox woman rabbi. Avi Weiss then launched a training school for Orthodox women in rabbinic positions, Yeshivat Maharat (acronym for "Morah hilkhatit rabbanit toranit"—a rabbinic, halakhic Torah teacher.) Rabbi Weiss had originally announced that graduates would be called "rabba", but when the Rabbinical Council of America threatened to oust him, he recanted and created the term maharat. The first cohort of maharats graduated in June 2013: Maharats Ruth Balinsky-Friedman, Rachel Kohl Finegold and Abby Brown Scheier. In 2015 Yaffa Epstein was ordained as Rabba by the Yeshivat Maharat. Also that year Lila Kagedan was ordained as Rabbi by the Yeshivat Maharat, making her their first graduate to take the title Rabbi.

In January 2013 Tamar Frankiel became the president of the Academy for Jewish Religion in California, making her the first Orthodox woman to lead an American rabbinical school. The school itself is transdenominational, not Orthodox.

In 2013 the Israeli Orthodox rabbinical organization Beit Hillel issued a halachic ruling which allows women, for the first time, to say the Kaddish prayer in memory of their deceased parents.

Also in 2013, the first class of female halachic advisers trained to practice in the US graduated; they graduated from the North American branch of Nishmat's yoetzet halacha program in a ceremony at Congregation Sheartith Israel, Spanish and Portuguese Synagogue in Manhattan. However, this event was met with only faint enthusiasm among Orthodox feminists for several reasons. One is that Nishmat consistently distances itself from feminism, as its founder Chana Henkin often pronounces that she is not a feminist and that the women who graduate from Nishmat do not adjudicate halakha but always ask male rabbis. Another reason is that against the backdrop of the graduation of women from Yeshivat Maharat, in which women are full leaders with complete authority to adjudicate and function as communal rabbis this event does not necessarily represent the greatest advancement for Orthodox women and is arguably a step backward. That is, women counseling women only on "women's issues" without any real halakhic authority of their own keeps women in a somewhat more official version of traditional gender roles.

In 2014, the first women were elected as national officers of the Orthodox Union; specifically, three female national vice presidents and two female associate vice presidents were elected.

In June 2015, Lila Kagedan was ordained by Yeshivat Maharat and in keeping with newer policies, was given the freedom to choose her own title, and she chose to be addressed as "Rabbi". In 2015, Rabbi Kagedan completed a residency at Shira Hadasha in Australia.

However, in the fall of 2015, the Rabbinical Council of America, representing over a thousand Orthodox rabbis across the United States, formally adopted a policy prohibiting the ordination or hiring of women rabbis by synagogues that operate within the boundaries of their figurative jurisdiction, regardless of title.

Also in 2015, the Israeli Orthodox rabbinical organization Beit Hillel issued a ruling which allows women to give instruction on Jewish law and to issue halachic decisions. Beit Hillel claimed that this ruling was the first time women issuing halachic rulings was formally affirmed in a written responsa of Jewish law.

Also in 2015, Jennie Rosenfeld became the first female Orthodox spiritual advisor in Israel (specifically, she became the spiritual advisor, also called manhiga ruchanit, for the community of Efrat.)

Also in 2015, the first Israeli political party dedicated to Haredi women was unveiled, called "B'Zhutan: Haredi Women Making Change".

In 2016 it was announced that Ephraim Mirvis created the job of ma'ayan by which women would be advisers on Jewish law in the area of family purity and as adult educators in Orthodox synagogues. This requires a part-time training course for 18 months, which is the first such course in the United Kingdom.

In 2017, the Orthodox Union adopted a policy banning women from serving as clergy, from holding titles such as "rabbi", or from doing common clergy functions even without a title, in its congregations in the United States.

=== Haredi approaches ===
The leaders of Haredi Judaism regularly pronounce many forms of feminism as "Reform", as non-Jewish, or as a threat to Jewish tradition. An article in Cross-currents criticizing advancing women's leadership writes that: "The entirety of traditional Jewish religious life, including its age-old ritual norms and societal norms, even if they lack formal codification, reflects Torah values, be they halachic or hashkafic; every aspect of our multi-millennia traditional religious communal modality is embedded in or predicated upon halachic or hashkafic axioms. These axioms may not be apparent to the uninitiated, yet failure to perceive them does not grant a license to negate, dismiss or reform." The haredi claim is that feminism is changing Torah.

Haredi Judaism also espouses strict essentialist differences between men and women, rooted in ideas about God's will and creation. The haredi worldview espouses the idea of womanhood as expressed in King Solomon's poem "A Woman of Valor", which praises a woman for maintaining the home, caring for the family, and food preparation, practices which the poem admires in women as part of their wisdom, courage, creativity, dedication, selflessness, and perhaps business acumen.

The most important thrust of haredi education for girls and young women is to educate, train and encourage them to become wives and mothers within large families devoted to the strictest Torah Judaism way of life. While most haredi women receive schooling in Beis Yaakov schools designed for them exclusively, the curriculum of these schools does not teach Talmud and neither encourages nor teaches its female students to study the same subjects as young haredi men in the haredi yeshivas. In some haredi communities, the education of girls in secular subjects (such as mathematics) is superior to that of boys. This is partly because of the greater time devoted to sacred subjects in the case of boys, and partly because many haredi women work in paid jobs to enable their husbands to engage in full-time Torah study or to bring in a second income.

There is currently no movement within haredi Judaism to train women as rabbis, and there is no visible movement to advance women's Talmudic knowledge.

In the fall of 2015, the Agudath Israel of America, which is part of haredi Judaism, denounced moves to ordain women, and went even further, declaring Yeshivat Maharat, Yeshivat Chovevei Torah, Open Orthodoxy, and other affiliated entities to be similar to other dissident movements throughout Jewish history in having rejected basic tenets of Judaism. Nevertheless, most haredi women are exposed to modern ideas and secular education, unlike most haredi men. Prof. Tamar El-or explored changes in women's lives and the impact of mixed educational cultures on women's empowerment in her seminal book, Educated and Ignorant about the education of women in the Gur Hassidic community. However, in 2016 it was learned that the Satmar sect issued a decree warning that university education for women was "dangerous". Written in Yiddish, the decree warned:

It has lately become the new trend that girls and married women are pursuing degrees in special education. Some attend classes and others online. And so we'd like to let their parents know that it is against the Torah.

We will be very strict about this. No girls attending our school are allowed to study and get a degree. It is dangerous. Girls who will not abide will be forced to leave our school. Also, we will not give any jobs or teaching positions in the school to girls who've been to college or have a degree.

We have to keep our school safe and we can't allow any secular influences in our holy environment. It is against the base upon which our Mosed was built.

There are some signs of a feminist movement beginning to sprout in the haredi world, especially in Israel. During the 2013 Israeli elections, Esti Shushan led a feminist drive to force haredi political parties to allow women to run on their lists (the parties currently forbid women from running). The campaign called on haredi women to refuse to vote for parties that exclude women. In addition, during the 2013 municipal elections in Israel, three haredi women took an unprecedented step and ran for their local municipalities—Shira Gergi in Safed, Ruth Colian in Petach Tikva, and Racheli Ibenboim in Jerusalem. Gergi is the only one who was elected, becoming the first haredi woman to sit on a municipal council, and becoming the first woman on the Safed council in twenty years.

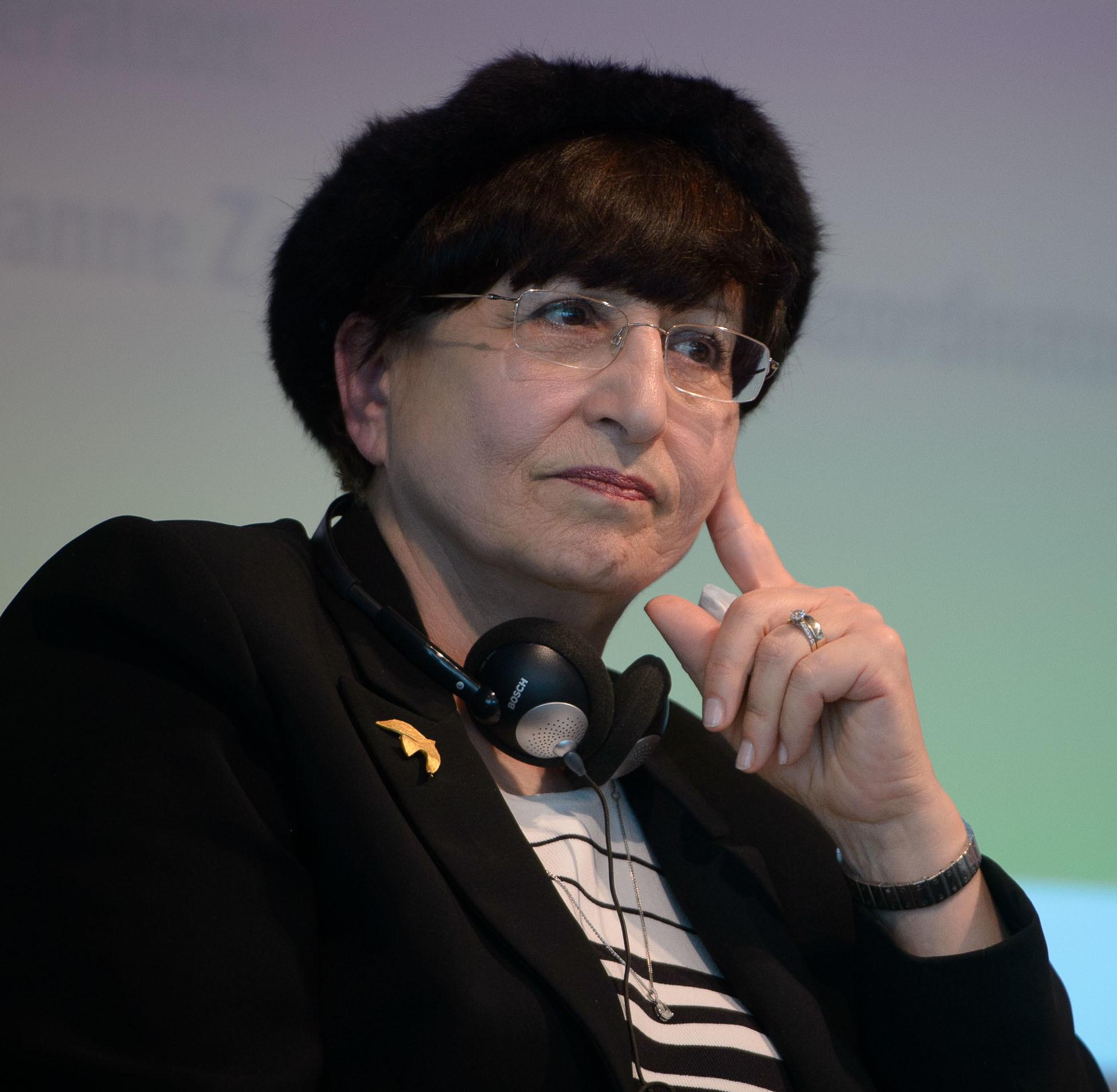
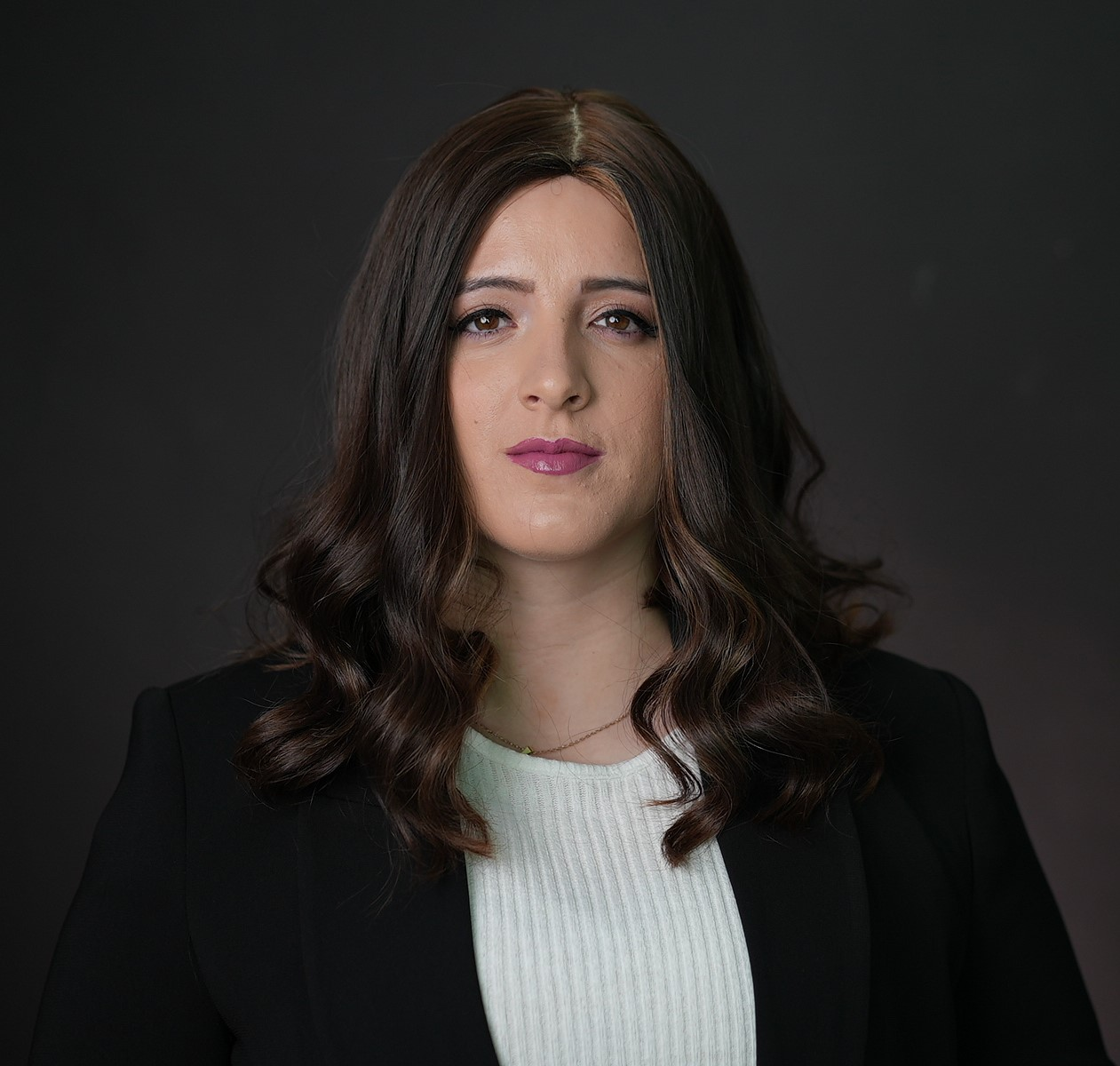
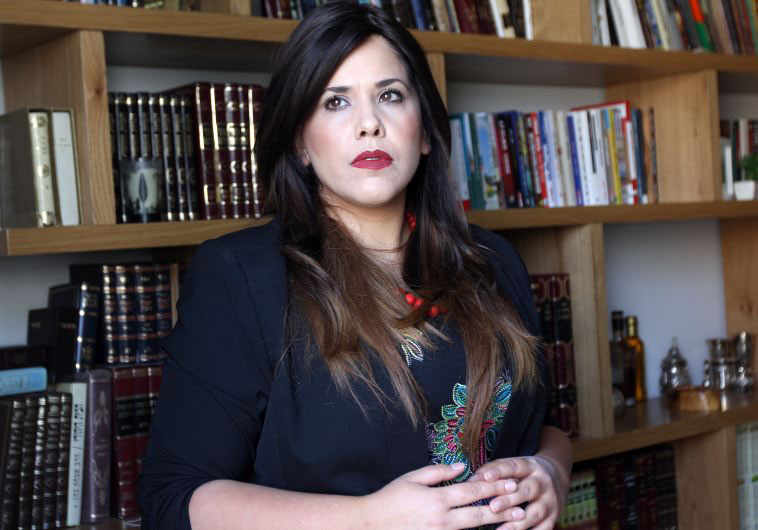
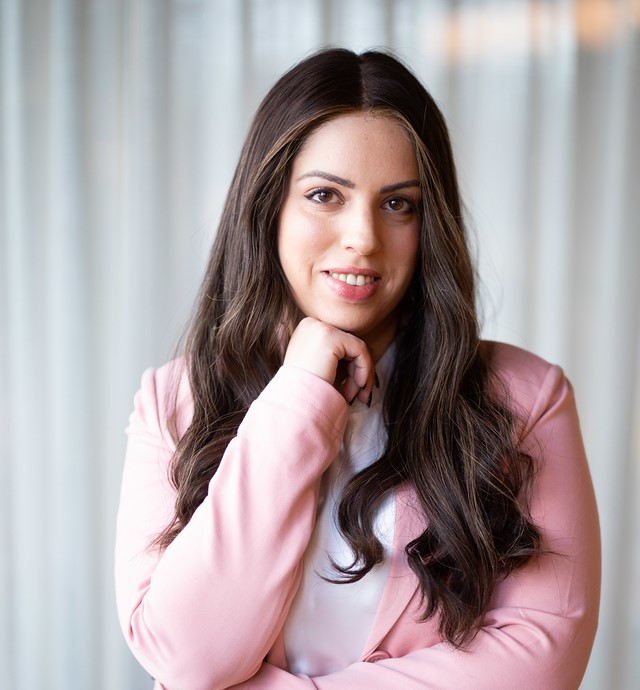
Leading hariedi feminist activists in Israel (left to right from top to bottom); Adina Bar-Shalom, Tzipi Lavie, Esti Shoshan, Efrat Shokron, and Esty Reider-Indorsky, .

One of the most interesting voices of haredi feminism is that of Adina Bar-Shalom, daughter of the late Israeli Sephardic Chief Rabbi Ovadia Yosef. Bar-Shalom established the Haredi College of Jerusalem, regularly speaks out about the importance of women's education and work, and in 2013 established a women's-only political party in the haredi town of Elad. In addition, in early 2014 she considered a bid to become the president of Israel. In March 2014, Bar-Shalom wrote that the haredi feminist revolution is already here. "The train has left the station", she wrote.

Midreshet Otot is one example of an Ultra-Orthodox program that holds the space for women to learn Talmud. Rabbi Kreuzer started Midreshet Otot in 2016, a secret weekly talmud discussion for women in the Ultra-Orthodox community. According to Avital Chizhik-Goldschmidt, who attended one of the study sessions, the scene was a vibrant house of study, with “the women speaking over one another”, displaying the hunger Haredi women had for the text. Woman learning Talmud in environments, such as Midreshet Otot, is a huge revolution for Ultra-Orthodox women.

One of the vocal Hareidi feminists in Israel is Tzipi Lavie. She started the Hareidi faction of the centre-left Yesh Atid party. She was part of the Nivcharot movement which is a Hareidi feminist organization calling for their political representation and rights. She showed in a poll through the organization that the majority of women asked apposed a bill suggested by the Hareidi MK Moshe Gafni for separate hours for different sexes at natural springs. She also led the Sarah Schnierer campaign promoting Hareidi feminism. She has called out Ultra-Orthodox concealing pictures of women.

Another emerging haredi voice is that of Esty Reider-Indorsky. She "came out" in March 2014 as a popular haredi columnist who had been writing under a man's name—"Ari Solomon"—and has a large following under her pseudonym. In an article in YNet, Reider-Indorsky claimed that there is a strong feminist movement brewing in the haredi community, and asked non-haredi women to stay out of their own internal revolution. "Don't patronize us", she writes to non-haredi feminists. "Don't make revolutions for us, or try to clean out our backyard. We are doing it in our own way and we are doing it better: There is an abundance of haredi women lawyers and women in start-ups.... There are haredi women who choose an academic career, and there are haredi women leading change in every area imaginable... The change will happen. it's already happening."

== Women in Jewish religious law, clergy, schools, groups, and rituals ==
In 1845, rabbis attending the Frankfort Synod of the emerging Reform Judaism declared women count in a minyan, a formalization of a customary Reform practice dating back to 1811.

In 1884, Julie Rosewald became America's first female cantor (though she was born in Germany); she served San Francisco's Temple Emanu-El, although she was not ordained. She served as a cantor there until 1893.

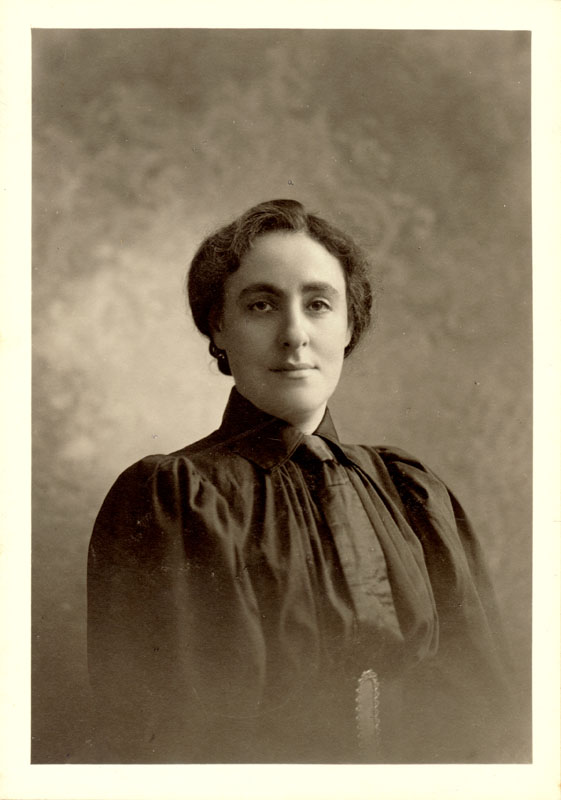
Ray Frank became the first Jewish woman to formally preach in a synagogue in 1890.

On 14 September 1890, Ray Frank gave the Rosh Hashanah sermon for a community in Spokane, Washington, thus becoming the first woman to preach from a synagogue pulpit, although she was not a rabbi.

On 18 March 1922, the American rabbi Mordecai M. Kaplan held the first public celebration of a bat mitzvah in the United States, for his daughter Judith, at the Society for the Advancement of Judaism, his synagogue in New York City. Judith Kaplan recited the preliminary blessing, read a portion of that week's Torah portion in Hebrew and English, and then intoned the closing blessing. Kaplan, who at that time claimed to be an Orthodox rabbi, joined Conservative Judaism and then became the founder of Reconstructionist Judaism, and influenced Jews from all branches of non-Orthodox Judaism through his position at the Jewish Theological Seminary of America.

Also in 1922, Martha Neumark and her father attended the Central Conference of American Rabbis Conference, where she succeeded in convincing the CCAR to ordain women rabbis. The CCAR declared in a responsa in 1922, "...woman cannot justly be denied the privilege of ordination", having voted 56 to 11 in favor of that statement. Yet the board of the college still refused to consider women for ordination, voting (as Neumark recalled) six laymen to two rabbis against it. Neumark thus earned a qualification as a religious school principal instead of ordination, though she had spent 7 1/2 years in a rabbinical school.

Also in 1922 Irma Lindheim entered the Jewish Institute of Religion in New York City, though she eventually left for the "greater cause of Zionism". While there, in 1923, she petitioned the faculty to change her status from that of special student to a regular student in the rabbinic program; in response, in May of that year they unanimously recommended the admission of women to the institute on the same basis as men.

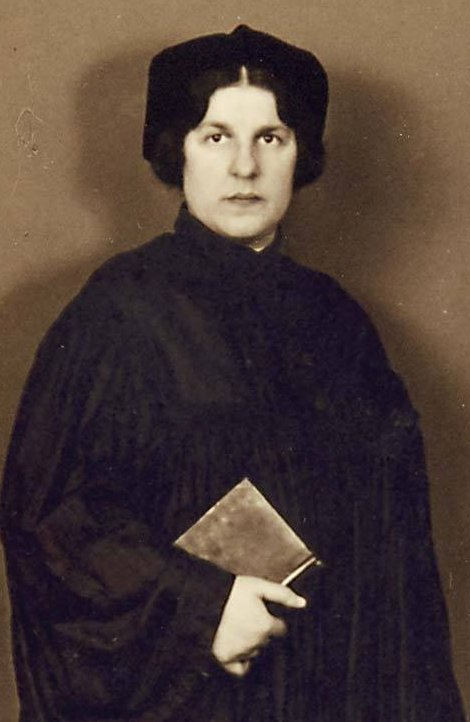
Regina Jonas, the first formally ordained female rabbi

In 1935, Regina Jonas became the first formally ordained female rabbi; she was ordained by the liberal Rabbi Max Dienemann, who was the head of the Liberal Rabbis' Association, in Offenbach am Main, Germany.

In 1939, Helen Levinthal became the first American woman to complete the entire course of study in a rabbinical school, which she did at the Jewish Institute of Religion in New York. Her thesis was on women's suffrage from the point of view of Jewish law. However, she only received a Master of Hebrew Letters (and a certificate recognizing her accomplishment) upon graduation, rather than a Master of Hebrew Letters and ordination as the men received, since the faculty felt it was not yet time for women's ordination as rabbis.

In 1955, the Committee on Jewish Law and Standards of Conservative Judaism declared that women were eligible to chant the blessings before and after the reading of the Torah, a privilege called "Aliyah". However, in 1962, a study found that only eight conservative congregations had fully embraced the ruling while fifty implemented it with conditions and 196 congregations still had not adopted this newfound right of Jewish women. In the late 1960s, the first Orthodox Jewish women's tefillah (prayer) group was created, on the holiday of Simhat Torah at Lincoln Square Synagogue in Manhattan. This development came by the judgement of the synagogue's rabbi, Shlomo Riskin. Further, the late 1960s saw Bat Mitzvahs, a public coming of age ritual for Jewish girls, become widespread after Reform, Reconstructionist, and Conservative Jews allowed women to partake in and lead a congregation in prayer. In 1973, the Committee on Jewish Law and Standards passed a takkanah (ruling) allowing women to count in a minyan equally with men. Also in 1973, the United Synagogue of America, Conservative Judaism's congregational association (now called the United Synagogue of Conservative Judaism) resolved to allow women to participate in synagogue rituals and to promote equal opportunity for women for positions of leadership, authority, and responsibility in congregational life. In 1974, the Committee on Jewish Law and Standards adopted a series of proposals that equalized men and women in all areas of ritual, including serving as prayer leaders.

In 1972 Sally Priesand became America's first female rabbi ordained by a rabbinical seminary, and the second formally ordained female rabbi, after Regina Jonas. Priesand was ordained by the Reform Jewish Seminary Hebrew Union College – Jewish Institute of Religion on 3 June 1972, at the Plum Street Temple in Cincinnati.

Also in 1972, a group of ten New York Jewish feminists calling themselves Ezrat Nashim (the women's section in a synagogue, but also "women's help"), took the issue of equality for women to the 1972 convention of the Conservative movement's Rabbinical Assembly, presenting a document on 14 March that they named the "Call for Change". The rabbis received the document in their convention packets, but Ezrat Nashim presented it during a meeting with the rabbis' wives. The Call for Change demanded that women be accepted as witnesses before Jewish law, held obligated to perform all mitzvot, allowed full participation in religious observances, have equal rights in marriage and be allowed to initiate divorce, be counted in the minyan, and be permitted to assume positions of leadership in the synagogue and within the Jewish community. Paula Hyman, a member of Ezrat Nashim, wrote: "We recognized that the subordinate status of women was linked to their exemption from positive time-bound mitzvot (commandments), and we therefore accepted increased obligation as the corollary of equality." With supportive persuasion from Gerson Cohen, the chancellor of the Jewish Theological Seminary, the Rabbinical Assembly accepted their proposal in 1973 and the JTS in 1983.

In 1973, the Committee on Jewish Law and Standards of Conservative Judaism voted to count men and women equally as members of a minyan.

In 1974 Sandy Eisenberg Sasso became the first female rabbi ordained in Reconstructionist Judaism.

In 1975, Barbara Ostfeld-Horowitz became the first female cantor ordained in Reform Judaism.

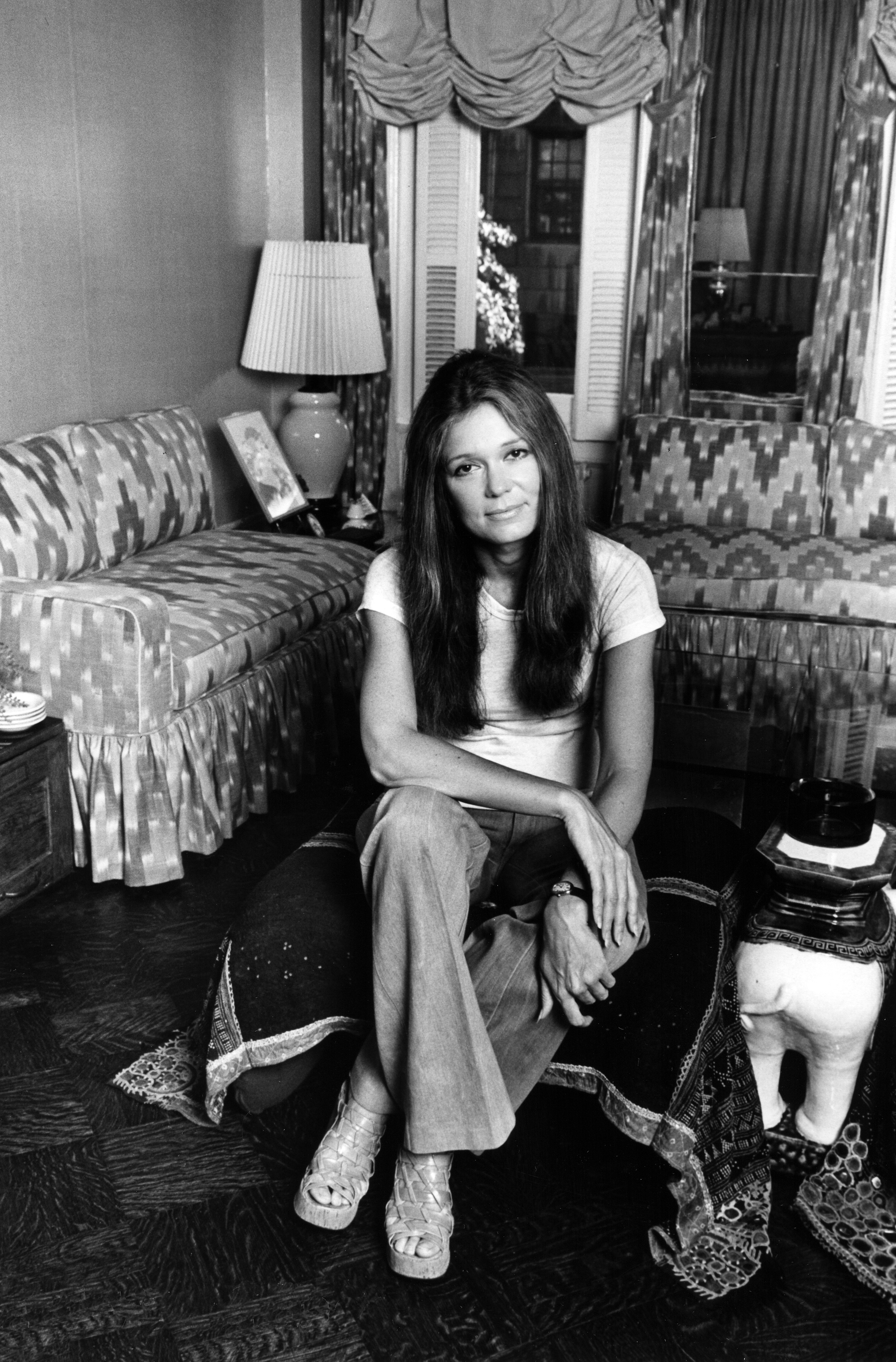
Gloria Steinem, a prominent Jewish feminist, attended Esther M. Broner's 1976 women-only seder.

In 1978 Linda Rich became the first female cantor to sing in a Conservative synagogue, specifically Temple Beth Zion in Los Angeles, although she was not ordained.

In 1979 Linda Joy Holtzman was hired by Beth Israel Congregation of Chester County, which was then located in Coatesville, Pennsylvania. She had graduated in 1979 from the Reconstructionist Rabbinical College in Philadelphia, yet was hired by Beth Israel despite their being a Conservative congregation. Holtzman was thus the first woman to serve as a rabbi for a solely Conservative congregation, as the Conservative movement did not then ordain women. However, Sandy Eisenberg Sasso served as rabbi along with her husband at the congregation Beth-El Zedeck in Indianapolis from 1977 until 2013; Beth El Zedeck is identified with both the Reconstructionist and Conservative movements.

In 1981 the Jewish feminist group "B'not Esh", Hebrew for "Daughters of Fire", was founded. As of 2011, this group meets for five days every year over Memorial Day weekend at the Grail, a Catholic laywomen's retreat center in Cornwall-on-Hudson, New York. There they, to quote Merle Feld, one of their members, "explore issues of spirituality, social change, and the feminist transformation of Judaism".

Also in 1981, Lynn Gottlieb became the first female rabbi ordained in Jewish Renewal.

In 1983, the Jewish Theological Seminary (JTS), the main educational institution of the Conservative movement, voted, without accompanying opinion, to ordain women as rabbis and as cantors. Paula Hyman, among others, took part in the vote as a member of the JTS faculty. American and Jewish feminism had pressured Conservatives congregations and their rabbis to create a special commission appointed by the Conservative movement to study the issue of ordaining women as rabbis. It met between 1977 and 1978, and consisted of 11 men and three women; the women were Marian Siner Gordon, an attorney, Rivkah Harris, an Assyriologist, and Francine Klagsbrun, a writer. Amy Eilberg became the first female rabbi ordained in Conservative Judaism in 1985. In disapproval of such developments, several members of the JTS separated in 1984 and formed the Union for Traditional Conservative Judaism. Later, in 1989, some of the dissidents founded the Institute of Traditional Judaism, an organization committed to "Genuine Faith and Intellectual Honesty", a direct counter-establishment to the liberation of women in religious practice and Jewish society

In 1987 Erica Lippitz and Marla Rosenfeld Barugel became the first female cantors ordained in Conservative Judaism. However, the Cantors Assembly, a professional organization of cantors associated with Conservative Judaism, did not allow women to join until 1990.

In 1997 Gail Billig became the first female president of a major Orthodox synagogue, at Congregation Ahavath Torah in Englewood, N.J.

In 1999 Tamara Kolton became the very first rabbi (and therefore, since she was female, the first female rabbi) ordained in Humanistic Judaism.

In 2001 Deborah Davis became the first cantor of either sex (and therefore, since she was female, the first female cantor) ordained in Humanistic Judaism; however, Humanistic Judaism has since stopped graduating cantors.

In 2002, the Committee on Jewish Law and Standards of Conservative Judaism adapted a responsum by Rabbi David Fine, Women and the Minyan, which provides an official religious-law foundation for counting women in a minyan and explains the current Conservative approach to the role of women in prayer. This responsum holds that although Jewish women do not traditionally have the same obligations as men, Conservative women have, as a collective whole, voluntarily undertaken them. Because of this collective undertaking, the Fine responsum holds that Conservative women are eligible to serve as agents and decision-makers for others. The responsum also holds that traditionally-minded communities and individual women can opt out without being regarded by the Conservative movement as sinning. By adopting this responsum, the CJLS found itself in a position to provide a considered Jewish-law justification for its egalitarian practices, without having to rely on potentially unconvincing arguments, undermine the religious importance of community and clergy, ask individual women intrusive questions, repudiate the halakhic tradition, or label women following traditional practices as sinners.

Also in 2002, Sharon Hordes became the first cantor of either sex (and therefore, since she was female, the first female cantor) ordained in Reconstructionist Judaism.

Also in 2002, Avitall Gerstetter, who lived in Germany, became the first female cantor ordained in Jewish Renewal (and the first female cantor in Germany).

In 2003, Rabbi Benay Lappe founded SVARA, a traditionally radical yeshiva with the mission of empowering queer and trans people to expand Torah and tradition through the spiritual practice of Talmud study.

In 2005, The Kohenet Institute was founded by Rabbi Jill Hammer and Holly Shere. The Kohenet Institute, based at the Isabella Freedman Jewish Retreat Center in Connecticut, offers a two-year course of study to women who are then ordained as Jewish priestesses. "Kohenet" is a feminine variation on "kohan", meaning priest. The Kohenet Institute's training involves earth-based spiritual practices that they believe harken back to pre–rabbinic Judaism; a time when, according to Kohenet's founders, women took on many more (and much more powerful) spiritual leadership roles than are commonly taken by women today. A Jewish priestess may, according to Kohenet, act as a rabbi, but the two roles are not the same.

In 2006, the Committee on Jewish Law and Standards of Conservative Judaism adopted three responsa on the subject of niddah, which reaffirmed an obligation of Conservative women to abstain from sexual relations during and following menstruation and to immerse in a mikvah prior to resumption, while liberalizing observance requirements including shortening the length of the niddah period, lifting restrictions on non-sexual contact during niddah, and reducing the circumstances under which spotting and similar conditions would mandate abstinence.

Also in 2006, Susan Wehle became the first American female cantor ordained in Jewish Renewal; however she died in 2009.

In June 2009, Avi Weiss ordained Sara Hurwitz with the title "maharat" (an acronym of manhiga hilkhatit rukhanit Toranit) rather than "Rabbi". In February 2010, Weiss announced that he was changing maharat to a more familiar-sounding title "rabba". The goal of this shift was to clarify Hurwitz's position as a full member of the Hebrew Institute of Riverdale rabbinic staff. The change was criticised by both Agudath Yisrael and the Rabbinical Council of America, who called the move "beyond the pale of Orthodox Judaism". Weiss announced amidst criticism that the term "Rabba" would not be used anymore for his future students. Hurwitz will continue to use the title Rabba and is considered by some to be the first female Orthodox rabbi. However Weiss said other graduates of Yeshivat Maharat, which he founded, would not receive the rabba title, but the maharat smicha. But in 2015 Yaffa Epstein was ordained as Rabba by the Yeshivat Maharat. Also in 2015, Lila Kagedan was ordained as Rabbi by that same organization, making her their first graduate to take the title Rabbi.

Also in 2009 Tannoz Bahremand Foruzanfar, who was born in Iran, became the first Persian woman to be ordained as a cantor in the United States.

Also in 2009, Alysa Stanton became the first African-American woman ordained as a rabbi.

In 2010 the first American women to be ordained as cantors in Jewish Renewal after Susan Wehle's ordination, Michal Rubin and Abbe Lyons, were both ordained.

In January 2013 Tamar Frankiel became the president of the Academy for Jewish Religion in California, making her the first Orthodox woman to lead an American rabbinical school. The school itself is transdenominational, not Orthodox.

In 2013 Malka Schaps became the first female haredi dean at an Israeli university when she was appointed dean of Bar Ilan University's Faculty of Exact Sciences.

In 2013 the Israeli Orthodox rabbinical organization Beit Hillel issued a halachic ruling which allows women, for the first time, to say the Kaddish prayer in memory of their deceased parents.

In 2013 SAR High School in Riverdale, New York began allowing girls to wrap tefillin during Shacharit-morning prayer; it is probably the first Modern Orthodox high school in the U.S. to do so.

On 26 October 2014 Rabbi Deborah Waxman was inaugurated as the president of the Reconstructionist Rabbinical College and Jewish Reconstructionist Communities. Waxman is believed to be the first woman rabbi and first lesbian to lead a Jewish congregational union, and the first woman and first lesbian to lead a Jewish seminary; the Reconstructionist Rabbinical College is both a congregational union and a seminary.

In 2014 the first ever book of halachic decisions written by women who were ordained to serve as poskim (Idit Bartov and Anat Novoselsky) was published. The women were ordained by the municipal chief rabbi of Efrat, Rabbi Shlomo Riskin, after completing Midreshet Lindenbaum women's college's five-year ordination course in advanced studies in Jewish law, as well as passing examinations equivalent to the rabbinate's requirement for men.

In 2014, Dr. Michelle Friedman became the first woman on the Beth Din of America's board of directors.

In 2014, the first women were elected as national officers of the Orthodox Union; specifically, three female national vice presidents and two female associate vice presidents were elected.

In June 2015, Lila Kagedan was ordained by Yeshivat Maharat and in keeping with newer policies, was given the freedom to choose her own title, and she chose to be addressed as "Rabbi". However, in the fall of 2015, the Rabbinical Council of America, representing over a thousand Orthodox rabbis across the United States, formally adopted a policy prohibiting the ordination or hiring of women rabbis by synagogues that operate within the boundaries of their figurative jurisdiction, regardless of title. Similarly, in the fall of 2015, the Agudath Israel of America denounced moves to ordain women, and went even further, declaring Yeshivat Maharat, Yeshivat Chovevei Torah, Open Orthodoxy, and other affiliated entities to be similar to other dissident movements throughout Jewish history in having rejected basic tenets of Judaism.

Also in 2015 the Israeli Orthodox rabbinical organization Beit Hillel issued a ruling which allows women to give instruction on Jewish law and to issue halachic decisions. Beit Hillel claimed that this ruling was the first time women issuing halachic rulings was formally affirmed in a written responsa of Jewish law.

Also in 2015, Jennie Rosenfeld became the first female Orthodox spiritual advisor in Israel (specifically, she became the spiritual advisor, also called manhiga ruchanit, for the community of Efrat.)

Also in 2015, Daryl Messinger became the first female chair of the Union for Reform Judaism.

In 2016, after four years of deliberation, the Reform seminary HUC-JIR decided to give women a choice of wording on their ordination certificates, including the option to have the same wording as men. Up until then, male candidates' certificates identified them by the Reform movement's traditional "morenu harav", or "our teacher the rabbi", while female candidates' certificates only used the term "rav u'morah", or "rabbi and teacher". Rabbi Mary Zamore, executive director of the Reform movement's Women's Rabbinic Network, explained that the HUC was uncomfortable with giving women the same title as men. In 2012 she wrote to Rabbi David Ellenson, HUC's then president, requesting that he address the discrepancy, which she said was "smacking of gender inequality".

In June 2015, Lila Kagedan was ordained by Yeshivat Maharat and in keeping with newer policies, was given the freedom to choose her own title, and she chose to be addressed as "Rabbi". She officially became the first female Modern Orthodox rabbi in the United States of America when the Modern Orthodox Mount Freedom Jewish Center in Randolph, New Jersey hired her as a spiritual leader in January 2016. As of 2019, Kagedan is working as the rabbi at Walnut Street Synagogue.

In 2023, Tefillat Trans: rituals and blessings for trans lives was published by the Trans Halakha Project at SVARA: A Traditionally Radical Yeshiva.

=== Women as sofrot (scribes) ===
A Sofer, Sopher, Sofer SeTaM, or Sofer ST"M (Heb: "scribe", סופר סת״ם) is a Jewish scribe who can transcribe Torah scrolls, tefillin and mezuzot, and other religious writings. (ST"M, סת״ם, is an abbreviation for Sefer Torahs, Tefillin, and Mezuzot. The plural of sofer is "soferim", סופרים.) Forming the basis for the discussion of women becoming soferim, Talmud Gittin 45b states: "Sifrei Torah, tefillin and mezuzot written by a heretic, a star-worshipper, a slave, a woman, a minor, a Cuthean, or an apostate Jew, are unfit for ritual use." The rulings on Mezuzah and Tefillin are virtually undisputed among those who hold to the Talmudic Law. While Arba'ah Turim does not include women in its list of those ineligible to write Sifrei Torah, some see this as proof that women are permitted to write a Torah scroll. However today, virtually all Orthodox (both Modern and Haredi) authorities contest the idea that a woman is permitted to write a Sefer Torah. Yet women are permitted to inscribe Ketubot (marriage contracts), STaM not intended for ritual use, and other writings of Sofrut beyond simple STaM. In 2003 Canadian Aviel Barclay became the world's first known traditionally trained female sofer. In 2007 Jen Taylor Friedman, a British woman, became the first female sofer to scribe a Sefer Torah. In 2010 the first Sefer Torah scribed by a group of women (six female sofers, who were from Brazil, Canada, Israel, and the United States) was completed; this was known as the Women's Torah Project.

From October 2010 until spring 2011, Julie Seltzer, one of the female sofrot from the Women's Torah Project, scribed a Sefer Torah as part of an exhibition at the Contemporary Jewish Museum in San Francisco. This makes her the first American female sofer to scribe a Sefer Torah; Julie Seltzer was born in Philadelphia and is non-denominationally Jewish. From spring 2011 until August 2012 she scribed another Sefer Torah, this time for the Reform congregation Beth Israel in San Diego. Seltzer was taught mostly by Jen Taylor Friedman. On 22 September 2013, Congregation Beth Elohim of New York dedicated a new Torah, which members of Beth Elohim said was the first Torah in New York City to be completed by a woman. The Torah was scribed by Linda Coppleson. As of 2014, there are an estimated 20 female sofers in the world.

== Women in Humanistic Judaism ==
Humanistic Judaism is a movement in Judaism that offers a nontheistic alternative in contemporary Jewish life. It defines Judaism as the cultural and historical experience of the Jewish people and encourages humanistic and secular Jews to celebrate their Jewish identity by participating in Jewish holidays and life cycle events (such as weddings and bar and bat mitzvah) with inspirational ceremonies that draw upon but go beyond traditional literature. Humanistic Judaism ordains both men and women as rabbis, and its first rabbi was a woman, Tamara Kolton, who was ordained in 1999. Its first cantor was also a woman, Deborah Davis, ordained in 2001; however, Humanistic Judaism has since stopped ordaining cantors. The Society for Humanistic Judaism issued a statement in 1996 stating in part, "we affirm that a woman has the moral right and should have the continuing legal right to decide whether or not to terminate a pregnancy in accordance with her own ethical standards. Because a decision to terminate a pregnancy carries serious, irreversible consequences, it is one to be made with great care and with keen awareness of the complex psychological, emotional, and ethical implications." They also issued a statement in 2011 condemning the then-recent passage of the "No Taxpayer Funding for Abortion Act" by the U.S. House of Representatives, which they called "a direct attack on a woman's right to choose". In 2012 they issued a resolution opposing conscience clauses that allow religious-affiliated institutions to be exempt from generally applicable requirements mandating reproductive healthcare services to individuals or employees. In 2013 they issued a resolution stating in part, "Therefore, be it resolved that: The Society for Humanistic Judaism wholeheartedly supports the observance of Women's Equality Day on 26 August to commemorate the anniversary of the passage of the Nineteenth Amendment to the U.S. Constitution allowing women to vote; The Society condemns gender discrimination in all its forms, including restriction of rights, limited access to education, violence, and subjugation; and The Society commits itself to maintain vigilance and speak out in the fight to bring gender equality to our generation and to the generations that follow."

Since the mid 19th century, the role of Jewish women in humanistic efforts has also extended to Second-Wave feminism. For instance, Ernestine Rose, an associate of civil rights activists Elizabeth Cady Stanton and Susan B. Anthony, led the push for women's rights to inherit property. As the daughter of a Polish rabbi, she simultaneously spoke out against anti-Semitism in her efforts. Additionally, Maud Nathan became a prominent voice in the suffrage movement of the early 20th century.

== Israel ==
From 1918 to 1926 women in Palestine fought for representation in the Yishuv movement. This was seen as the first wave of feminism, before the state was established.

A second wave of feminism came to Israel in the 1970s. During a time when women made up less than seven percent of the Knesset, in 1969, Golda Meir was appointed Israel's first female prime minister. 1972 marks the creation of the first radical women's movement in Israel and the beginning of second-wave feminism in Israel. During the Yom Kippur War in 1973, women were not allowed in Military leadership, civilian administration, and war production. However, women found other ways to become more actively engaged. Overall, the 1970s were a time of major growth and transition for feminism in Israeli society.

In 2006, Israel's Supreme Court ruled that women should be allowed to deliver eulogies and that the burial societies, or chevra kadisha, should not impose gender segregation in the cemetery. The ruling was in response to an incident in Petach Tikvah in which a woman was stopped from eulogizing her father. However, the court's ruling was not backed up by the Religious Services Ministry until 2012, when Israel's Chief Rabbinical Council ruled that women can deliver eulogies at funerals, but that it is up to the community rabbi to decide on a case-by-case basis.

On 28 September 2010, the Israeli Supreme Court outlawed public gender segregation in Jerusalem's Mea Shearim neighborhood in response to a petition submitted after extremist Haredi men physically and verbally assaulted women for walking on a designated men's only road. However, in January 2011, a ruling of the Israeli High Court of Justice allowed the continuation of the gender segregation in public buses on a strictly voluntary basis for a one-year experimental period.

In 2013 the Israeli Orthodox rabbinical organization Beit Hillel issued a halachic ruling which allows women, for the first time, to say the Kaddish prayer in memory of their deceased parents.

Also in 2013, the Religious Judges Law in Israel was amended to say that at least four women must be included in the religious judges' nomination committee, including a female advocate in the religious courts, and that the total number of committee members shall be eleven. Another event that took place in 2013 is Israel's Chief Rabbinate promise to remove the obstacles preventing women from working as supervisors in the state kosher certification system, and Emunah announced the first supervisor certification course for women in Israel.

In 2015, the first Israeli political party dedicated to Haredi women was unveiled, called "B'Zhutan: Haredi Women Making Change".

In 2016 it was announced that the High Court of Justice had given the Justice Ministry 30 days to formulate new regulations to allow women to compete equally with men for the position of director of rabbinical courts.

Also in 2016, Karmit Feintuch became the first woman to be hired as a communal leader at an Orthodox synagogue in Israel (Ramban Synagogue).

=== Western Wall ===
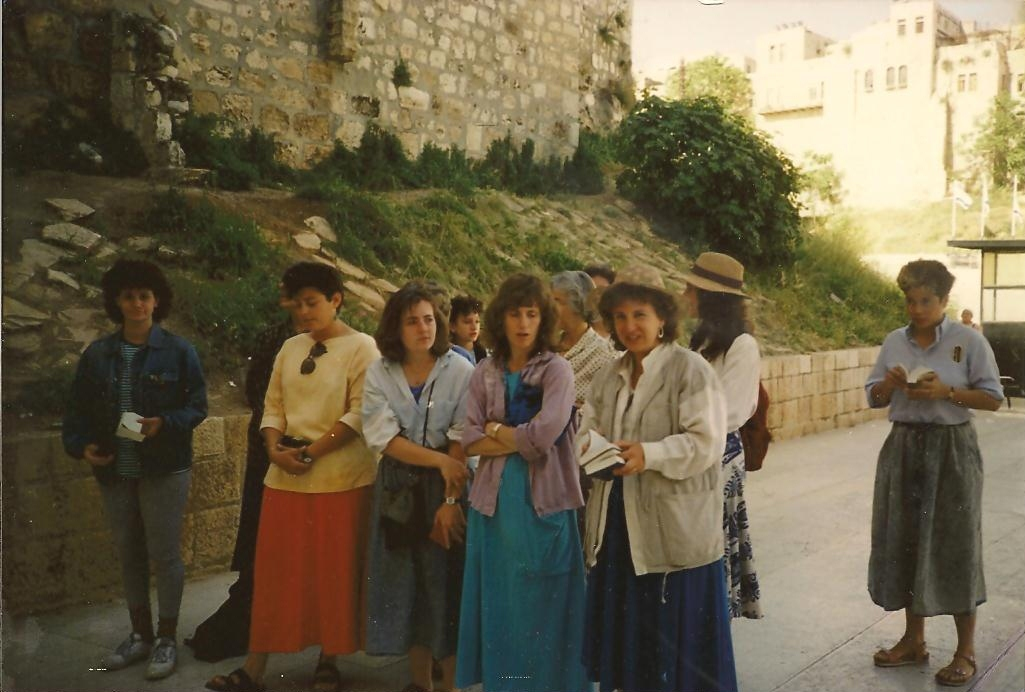
Founding members of Women of the Wall in Jerusalem

In May 2013, after Women of the Wall, led by Anat Hoffman, had engaged in civil disobedience to exercise freedom of religion, a judge ruled that a 2003 Israeli Supreme Court ruling prohibiting women from carrying a Torah or wearing prayer shawls at the Western Wall had been misinterpreted and that Women of the Wall prayer gatherings at the Western Wall should not be deemed illegal.

In October 2014 Women of the Wall smuggled in a Torah scroll to the Western Wall women's section and held their first Torah reading by a woman at the site, which was part of the bat mitzvah of Sasha Lutt. However, Shmuel Rabinowitz, the rabbi of the Western Wall, issued a statement saying in part, "In future, efforts will be made to ensure that this does not happen again, and the introduction of Torah scrolls will be banned for everyone—men and women."

In December 2014 some of the Women of the Wall became the first women to light menorahs at the Western Wall. Specifically, they lit 28 menorahs in the women's section of the Wall. Sarah Silverman was among those who attended the lighting of the menorahs. However, this event came after the rabbi in charge of the Western Wall had refused a request from Women of the Wall to place a menorah in the women's section.

In January 2017, the Israeli High Court ruled that if the government of Israel could not find "good cause" to prohibit women from reading from the Torah in prayer services at the Western Wall within 30 days, women could do so; they also ruled that the Israeli government could no longer argue that the Robinson's Arch area of the plaza is "access to the Western Wall".

== Agunah ==
Agunah (Hebrew: עגונה, plural: agunot (עגונות); literally 'anchored or chained') is a halachic term for a Jewish woman who is "chained" to her marriage. The classic case of this is a man who has left on a journey and has not returned, or has gone into battle and is MIA. It also refers to a woman whose husband refuses, or is unable, to grant her an official Jewish bill of divorce, known as a get. The problem of get-refusal became more widespread when Jews lived in countries where civil divorce was available, separate from religious divorce. Outside Israel, an agunah could obtain a civil divorce and remarry via civil marriage, as non-Israeli legal systems generally do not recognize the agunah status, but an agunah would not typically pursue a second marriage, since her first marriage is still valid according to halakha, therefore any other sexual relationships would constitute adultery from her first husband. Furthermore, according to halakha, any children born by an agunah are considered mamzerim (bastards).

The earliest prenuptial agreement for the prevention of get-refusal was developed and accepted by the Rabbinical Council of Morocco on 16 December 1953. The prenuptial agreement gained further approbation in 1981 from Rabbi Shalom Messas, chief rabbi of Jerusalem. Following Rabbi Messas' involvement, the Rabbinical Council of America actively pursued this issue. The latest in a series of RCA resolutions—" that since there is a significant agunah problem in America and throughout the Jewish world, no rabbi should officiate at a wedding where a proper prenuptial agreement on get has not been executed"—was passed on 18 May 2006.

In 2012 the International Rabbinic Fellowship (IRF), an international organization of (as of 2012) 150 Modern Orthodox rabbis, passed a resolution saying that "IRF Rabbis may not officiate at a wedding unless the couple has signed a halachic prenuptial agreement. IRF Rabbis are further encouraged to participate ritually only in weddings in which the couple has signed a halachic prenuptial agreement. Ritual participation includes but is not limited to reading the ketubah, serving as a witness, and making one of the sheva berachot." This makes the IRF the only Orthodox rabbinical organization in the world to require its members to use a halachic pre-nuptial agreement in any wedding at which they officiate.

Beginning in the 1950s, some Conservative rabbis have used the Lieberman clause, named for Talmudic scholar and Jewish Theological Seminary (JTS) professor Saul Lieberman, in the ketuba, requiring that a get be granted if a civil divorce is ever issued. Most Orthodox rabbis have rejected the Lieberman clause, although leaders of the Conservative movement claim that the original intent was to find a solution that could be used by Orthodox and Conservative rabbis alike and that leaders of Orthodox Judaism's Rabbinical Council of America, and respected Orthodox rabbis, including Joseph B. Soloveitchik, supposedly recognized the clause as valid. Later, because some civil courts viewed the enforcement of a religious document as a violation of the constitutional principle of the separation of church and state, Conservative rabbis began to require couples to sign a separate letter, stating that the clause had been explained to them as part of pre-marital counseling and that both parties understood and agreed to its conditions, recognizing that this letter would constitute a separate civil document, enforceable in a civilian court. However, many Conservative rabbis, including some on the movement's own law committee, had growing misgivings about the clause for religious reasons.

In 1968, by a unanimous vote of the law committee, it was decided that the Joint Bet Din of the Conservative movement could annul marriages as a last resort, based on the Talmudic principle of hafka'at kiddushin. According to Rabbi Mayer Rabinowitz, the Chairman of the Joint Bet Din of the Conservative Movement, just the threat of this action was sometimes enough to compel the former husband to grant a get.

In 1990 Agunah Day was established by ICAR—The International Coalition for Agunah Rights—to raise public awareness of the plight of the Agunah and galvanize action to solve the problem. It is observed on the Jewish calendar date of the Fast of Esther.

In 1995 the Israeli parliament gave the rabbinical court expanded legal power to sanction men who refuse to give their wives a get by suspending their driver's licenses, seizing their bank accounts, preventing travel abroad and even imprisoning those who do not comply with an order to grant a divorce; however, women's groups say the 1995 law is not very effective because the court uses sanctions in less than 2% of cases.

In 2004, Justice Menachem HaCohen of the Jerusalem Family Court offered new hope to agunot when he ruled that a man refusing his wife a get must pay her NIS 425,000 in punitive damages, because "[R]efusal to grant a get constitutes a severe infringement on her ability to lead a reasonable, normal life, and can be considered emotional abuse lasting several years." He noted that "[T]his is not another sanction against someone refusing to give a get, intended to speed up the process of granting a get, and this court is not involving itself in any future arrangements for the granting of a get, but rather, it is a direct response to the consequences that stem from not granting a get, and the right of the woman to receive punitive damages." This ruling stemmed from the Public Litigation Project initiated by the advocacy organization Center for Women's Justice as one of a number of successful lawsuits filed in Israeli civil courts claiming financial damages against recalcitrant husbands.

In 2014 the Rabbinate of Uruguay instituted the requirement for all Jewish couples that marry under its auspices to sign a Rabbinic Pre-nuptial Agreement. The agreement states that in the case of the couple divorcing civilly, the husband is obligated to immediately deliver to his wife a get. The initiative was launched by Sara Winkowski, a director of the Kehila, the Comunidad Israelita del Uruguay (Jewish Community of Uruguay), who is also a Vice President of the World Jewish Congress and longtime activist for the rights of women within Jewish law.

In 2015 Tzohar (a religious Zionist rabbinic organization in Israel), along with the Israel Bar Association, introduced a prenuptial agreement meant to help ensure divorcing wives will receive a get; under the agreement the husband commits to paying a high sum of money daily to his spouse in the event of a separation.

In 2016, in a groundbreaking ruling, the Tel Aviv Rabbinical Court ordered a man jailed for thirty days for helping his son refuse to give his daughter-in-law a divorce for eleven years.

In 2018 the Knesset passed a law, slated to remain in effect for three years, allowing Israel's rabbinical courts to handle certain cases of Jewish women wishing to divorce their Jewish husbands, even if neither the wife nor the husband is an Israeli citizen.

== Women of Color ==
Jewish women of color, a term that means to be of a race other than white such as black, Latin, Asian, or native, and includes Sephardic and Mizrahi Jewish women, are among the groups that have been affected by feminism in a positive manner. It is a group that is facing challenges in multiple areas of their lives. They often feel excluded or marginalized by a community that has been historically dominated by white Ashkenazi Jews. Women of color have taken a strong leadership and activist role within their communities and history.

An instance of this is the presence felt by Jewish women of color as a result of the controversy that surrounded the 2019 Women's March. The Woman's March had seen success in the previous two years but was seeing a decline in attendance, with the controversy contributing to the problem. The Women's March had four co-chairs, Linda Sarsour, Tamika Mallory, Bob Bland, and Carmen Perez, who were called to resign due to their failure to denounce the leader of the Nation of Islam, Louis Farrakhan, who had been known to be openly antisemitic, homophobic, and transphobic. There was public outcry over their silence until a statement was eventually released. Jewish women of color organized and came together to have a strong presence at the march while Black-Jewish activists such as Yavilah McCoy and April Baskin participated in the 2019 Women's March steering committee. They had a large impact on the importance of having a Jewish individual and inclusion within racially diverse feminist spaces.

== Major texts ==
In 2003 The Female Face of God in Auschwitz: A Jewish Feminist Theology of the Holocaust, the first full-length feminist theology of the Holocaust, written by Melissa Raphael, was published. Judith Plaskow's Standing Again at Sinai: Judaism from a Feminist Perspective (1991), and Rachel Adler's Engendering Judaism: An Inclusive Theology and Ethics (1999) are the only two full-length Jewish feminist works to focus entirely on theology in general (rather than specific aspects such as Holocaust theology). Thus, Standing Again at Sinai: Judaism from a Feminist Perspective (1991) is the first book of Jewish feminist theology ever written.

== See also ==
- List of Jewish feminists
- Feminist Jewish ethics
- Jewish Women's Archive
- Homosexuality and Judaism
- Israeli feminism
- Mizrahi feminism
- Orthodox Jewish feminism
