= DaKAH =

American hip hop group

daKAH or daKAH hip hop orchestra is an orchestra co-founded by Los Angeles composer and the orchestra's conductor Geoff Gallegos (Double G) with a diverse group of 23 musicians in 1999.

== Name ==
According to Double G's interview with Los Angeles music reporter Ife Oshun in 2005, the name daKAH "has roots in ancient Ghana" and it refers to "a policy of societal organization and an understanding of the creative process" in which people are given tasks according to their skills, creating "a feeling of meaningful work amongst people, and the satisfaction in feeling like you're on your right path." He started capitalizing the second syllable to assist with pronunciation.

== History ==
daKAH grew out of a wave of multidisciplinary hip-hop collectives that grew out of the Los Angeles club scene that also included the L.A. Symphony, Breakestra and Ozomatli. Among its founding members there were saxophonist Matt DeMerritt, multi-instrumentalist Gabby La La, Viola player Ashley English Tobin and trombonist Elizabeth Lea.

The orchestra got its start playing in a club in Santa Monica that primarily showcases DJs and world music. Members of the orchestra play and sing at open mic poetry and musical jam events. Along with original compositions, daKAH does arrangement, transcription and orchestration for existing hip-hop recordings and other work that has been influential for hip-hop, include Gang Starr ("Gang Starr Remix"), the Roots ("Rootrilogy"), and Parliament Funkadelic.

When Scion, a discontinued marque of Toyota, launched the Scion record label to promoting underground artists, daKAH was its first band. The Los Angeles-based orchestra has expanded steadily since its inception and received much audience acclaim for its genre-bending and culture-blending performances. In 2002, Geoff Gallegos received a Durfee Foundation Artist Award. In 2004, the orchestra was presented by Los Angeles Philharmonic as part of the Sounds About Town series, featuring Los Angeles area's premier youth orchestras, at Walt Disney Concert Hall.

== Style ==
The music of daKAH, despite being first and foremost a hip-hop group, mixes European symphony orchestra with sounds from popular music with the help of musicians who bring training and experience in different musical styles to create a hip-hop orchestra, marrying two very different genres while maintaining the integrity of both. The orchestra features up to 70 pieces, with 10 rapper MCs, turntable DJs, a small chorus of hip-hop vocalists, 14 horns, winds like trumpet and bassoon, a 15-piece string section, and a percussion section.

While the combination of hip-hop and live instrumentation is not novel, daKAH pulls it off in "a grandiloquent style steeped in the feel-good vibe of the early-1990s acid jazz/hip-hop scene". Also while hip hop artists have always been sampling classical and jazz music, it is rare to find classical players, jazz hornists, and rapper MCs onstage together like with daKAH.

Members of daKAH come from widely diverse musical backgrounds, cultural experiences, artistic tastes, and lifestyles. They include both formally trained musicians and the self-taught and improvisers from jazz and contemporary traditions. The Los Angeles Philharmonic website describes it as "a United Nations of music." The orchestra is more appreciated as a live band at shows like Live at Grand Performances, where it performs "more durable materials" like Ashford and Simpson’s "California Soul" and Parliament-Funkadelic’s "Come in Out of the Rain".

The music of daKAH draws on both a West Coast tradition of drawing on funk music and what Music theorist Adam Krims categorizes as jazz/bohemian hip-hop (many of these groups are also defined as West Coast underground hip-hop). Others in this category include A Tribe Called Quest, the Black Eyed Peas (which shares a member with daKAH), and the Roots. The hip-hop of daKAH attracts audiences from a wide range of racial and ethnic backgrounds and is not measured by the East Coast-West Coast rivalry of the early 1990s.

== Studio album: Unfinished Symphony (2002) ==
daKAH's released its first studio album, Unfinished Symphony, in 2002. The album was accompanied by The Stravingus Remixes, an anonymous remix album. According to JazzTimes, "On Unfinished Symphony, a 12-song cycle divided into two movements, the group wraps swirling cinematic orchestral arrangements around various grooves that range from ass-gripping funk to swaying reggae. For a hip-hop perspective, none of the MCs offer any lyrical brilliance worthy of the opulent ambiance." The best song in the album, according to music critic John Murph, is the R&B number "Adagio Asiago (Tryin II Sow My Love)" that features Fanny Franklin’s alto, swift jazz excursions, sing-songy melodies, luxurious string arrangements and dazzling horn interplays.
