= Kohenet movement =

Jewish feminist religious movement

The Kohenet movement is a Jewish feminist religious movement. "Kohenet" (כֹּהֶנֶת) is a Mishnaic Hebrew term used to describe the daughter of a kohen (a priest in the Temple in Jerusalem), as well as a title given to members of the Kohenet movement who have undergone ordination. The group, and its original organizing body, the Kohenet Institute, were founded in 2005 by Rabbi Jill Hammer and Taya Shere. The program began offering ordination—or semikhah (סְמִיכָה) in normative Judaism—in 2006. The movement has sometimes been accused of paganism or heresy due to its use of the term "priestess" and its view of God as feminine. Some describe it as belonging to a broader movement called "Goddess Judaism", though not all adherents view the divine as a woman (some instead see God as non- or multi-gendered).

== Beliefs ==
The kohenets' beliefs are primarily based on components of Kabbalah, Jewish feminism, and ecotheology, as well as branches of liberal Judaism. There are also some generalized influences from modern online spiritual practices, such as some kohenets building altars with devotional objects (e.g., rocks, candles, and photos of dead relatives) to help them focus during prayer. For the kohenets, this is connected to the setting of the Shabbat table (with food and candles), as well as to the bamot (בָּמוֹת, 'high places') and altars in the Mishkan (מִשְׁכָּן, 'residence'), Temple, and surrounding region. The bamot and Mishkan are ancient practices not continued today, as King Josiah and King Hezekiah ended Israelites' cult activities outside the Temple during their reigns. There is also some influence from other religions and Near Eastern myths, and pre-Rabbinic Judaism.

Rabbi Hammer, before starting the movement, faced frustrations with other Jews, especially women, for emphasizing heteropatriarchal views of God. For example, she recalled an incident in which a woman declared that "God could not be a woman", because she—God—would be incapable of enforcing morality. In her rabbinical training at the Jewish Theological Seminary of America, which is affiliated with Conservative Judaism, Hammer found an absence of specifically female perspectives in many areas. However, she also developed an interest in midrashim (מִדְרָשִׁים, '[textual] exegeses'; sing. מִדְרָשׁ, midrash) focusing on women, and realized there was a clear tradition of women serving as community spiritual leaders throughout Jewish history. Shere encountered similar resistance to Jewish feminine perspectives on God, joining other religious movements that centered women more—including Candomblé—before returning to Judaism. Many kohenets feel that egalitarian Judaism (i.e., Conservative Judaism, Reform Judaism, Reconstructionist Judaism, and some post-denominational Judaisms) has not gone far enough in addressing patriarchy. The movement also tries to provide affirmation and openness to queer Jews and Jews of color.

Jewish meditation, movement, and music are major elements of kohenet rituals. Innovation of ritual and theology is welcomed. Drums are often used to accompany prayer and chanting, coming both from liberal Judaism's contemporary allowance of musical instruments in prayer and in reference to female ritual drummers in Jewish scripture. Members of the movement frequently take on new names. Kohenet members undergo Jewish ritual washing in mikvot (מִקְווֹת, 'gatherings [of water]'; sing. מִקְוֶה, mikveh), observe Shabbat and study the Torah weekly as other Jewish groups do. They are encouraged by the movement literature to do the traditional prayers regularly and rejuvenate their connection to them. It is primarily open to women and non-binary people, but men also take part in events.

The Kohenets (as part of an earth-based approach) place importance on the four elements, connecting them to the four worlds sometimes found in Jewish mysticism (assiyah, yetzirah, beriyah, and atzilut) as well as the four parts of the self (body, heart, mind, spirit). This is derived from Kabbalistic literature. However, they differ in that, rather than seeing the worlds as progressing from highest to lowest (the traditional view), they are seen as interlocking circles of equal importance. Each element is commonly invoked or incorporated into Kohenet rituals.

God is understood as whatever gender an individual in the movement identifies God with. Feminine names for God used in the movement include Havaya (Being), Shaddai (Almighty, but also indirectly refers to breasts), Immah (Mother), Tzimtzemai (the One who Makes Space, derived from a Babylonian Talmud passage implying this is another name for the Shekinah), Malkat haShamayim (Queen of Heaven), Asherah, Chokhmah (Wisdom), Etz Chayyim (Tree of Life), and more. Gender neutral terms like Ma’yan Chayim (Wellspring of Life), Ruach (Divine Wind), and Yah (Divine Breath) are also used, and masculine terms like Adonai (Lord) and Melekh (King) see some use as well. All of these names are generally understood as referring to the same being. Sometimes God is, however, conceived of as having multiple faces in a manner derived from the Kabbalist tradition.

While the use of the name Asherah in particular draws controversy because it is the name of a rival Canaanite goddess, Kohenets point out that El is also the name of a Canaanite god who rivaled the Jewish God. Yet, it is seen as acceptable to "El" as a name for God. Generally, Kohenets do not worship a separate goddess when they use "Asherah", but recognize "Asherah" as one of the many divine names.

The idea of "priestess" is part innovation and part based on obscured examples of female sacred service, such as the tzavot, who are known to have served at the entrance of the mishkan but are not described in any further detail. Hammer believes these roles were gradually obscured, with the first exile of 586 BC dealing a major blow to them. She compares the suppression and loss of female spiritual roles to that of the letter ghayin; a letter symbolizing the "ng" sound (still extant in Arabic) that fell out of use in the early biblical period, supplanted by the ayin, and which probably resembled a twisted cord. Letters have a particular significance in Judaism, with some believing the only thing God revealed to Moses and the people at Mount Sinai was the letter aleph. The letter, to Hammer, represents the suppressed voice of the prophetess, and claims that before she knew of its existence, she dreamed she gave a lecture on a missing Hebrew letter symbolizing "ng", and the attendant theological implications. This led her to research and confirm the reality of her dream.

The movement literature draws on archeology and historical analysis regarding the presence of things like Asherah poles in the Jerusalemite Temple for most of its existence to argue for a modern re-acceptance of women in clerical roles and goddess imagery. Additionally, the Talmud mentions that women in the priestly caste received priestly offerings and were allowed to eat sacred food, though they could not perform temple rites. It also discusses the bamot (high places) as acceptable worship sites in the absence of a temple (which also existed alongside the temple until Hezekiah). At the Bamot, it was permissible to ordain women into religious service. They cite Tzipporah (acting to save Moses during their journey to Egypt from a spiritual attack), Miriam (a Levite and holder of the title neviah), and Deborah as named figures who fill a priestess or prophetess role in scripture. Francesca Sarah of Safed (who had sacred visions), Rebbetzin Malka of Belz, Hannah Rachel Werbermacher (both Hasidic figures), and Colette Alboulker-Moscat (a Kabbalist) are cited as more recent historical examples.

=== Ordination ===
Base ordination consists of four retreats over 18 to 24 months. Students are given the title tzovah, meaning "keeper of sacred space and time". This course of study is called "Netivot" and introduces one to the priestess paths, praying, and ritual construction in the kohenet way.

To become a kohenet, one undertakes an additional year and a half of study, during which the 13 priestess paths come into sharper focus. These are based on female archetypes found in Jewish culture and literature: Maiden, Mother, Matriarch, Midwife, Wise Woman, Mourning Woman, Prophetess, Shrinekeeper, Shamaness, Seeker, Lover, Fool, and Weaver. Each kohenet is ordained in a specific path. Each priestess and path is sometimes understood as a microcosm of God(ess). The identification of these paths is partly based on the book "The Women's Wheel of Life", which also identified 13 spiritual archetypes for women. 13 may also have been chosen for the number of full moons in a year. Each path is connected to a month of the Jewish year. This course of study is called "Kedeishot". The full ordination takes three years, and has three additional retreats. As of 2021, there were around 100 graduates of the Kohenet Institute, including some based outside the US. Currently, Beit Kohenet does not have an ordination course, but plans to reinstitute one in the future. Ordination has been noted as less expensive and difficult to manage when compared to rabbinical school.

While many kohenets teach, study Torah, officiate at funerals, house blessings, healing ceremonies, pilgrimages, harvest rituals, weddings, serve as chaplains, or are dually ordained as rabbis, there are currently no kohenet-specific synagogues. There also is no conversion process to specifically become a Jew under the Kohenet movement, as there is for Reform, Conservative, Reconstructionist and Orthodox Judaism.

==== The Priestess Paths ====
The maiden (nara'ah) is typified by Rebeccah, Miriam when watching over Moses' basket, the maidens who dance at the sacred shrine of Shiloh to celebrate the harvest, a servant of Wisdom, and the daughters of Tzelafchad. It represents presence, action, and fellowship. The movement also references how various Jews throughout time have viewed Shabbat as a virgin daughter. In the Psalms, it is mentioned that alamot (young girls/women) beat drums in Temple processions to announce military victory. The movement also connects several passages discussing maiden dancers and drummers in vineyards, juxtaposed with priests, as potentially referencing some ritual performed by maidens, particularly on Tu b'Av and Yom Kippur.

The mother (eim) is represented by Sarah, Leah, Hagar, Yocheved, Batya, as Hannah, and Naamah, Noah's wife. It represents love, nurturing, and compassion. The name of God, "El Shaddai" can translate as God of Breasts, and implies nursing imagery. It is also noted that in the movement literature, most named Nazirites are women, particularly mothers or those trying to become mothers. Nazirite vows involve stipulations similar to the Levite priests. The lighting of Shabbat candles (often done by mothers) is also given significance here, especially as many historical tkhine (Yiddish personal prayers) used for it compare women to priests. Also significant are birth rituals that connect women to the synagogue through the use of parochets and keys.

The matriarch or queen (gevirah) is represented by Sarah, the Queen of Sheba, the queen mother Maacah, Esther, Vashti, Judith and Yael. It represents strength, power, warriorhood, and guardianship. It is partly based on the idea that the queen mothers of ancient Judea had religious authority similar to other Near Eastern cultures, where queen mothers served as priestesses (particularly to mother goddesses, like Asherah). These queen mothers also had sway over the line of succession and were compared to lionesses. Also relevant are the ritual guardians who stood at the gates of the Temple sanctuary and today watch over the dead and newlyweds, and the description of the Shekinah as a warrior queen in Kabbalistic literature.

The midwife (meyaledet) is represented by Shifrah and Puah, the midwives who helped Rachel and Tamar to deliver, and in "the Holy One who led Israel through the birth canal of the sea". It represents mentoring, creation, and growth. Hammer has also written a midrash describing Elisheva as a midwife who rescues an Egyptian baby from the angel of death. Midwives are noted in Hebrew literature as giving oracles and, historically, as being expected to be pious. Further, Jewish midwives often used charms and magic rituals in their work.

The wise woman (chachamah) is represented by Abigail, the wise woman of Avel, the wise women who spin the wool for the Tabernacle, the wise woman of Tekoa, Serach, and "Wisdom herself" from the book of Proverbs. It represents understanding, wisdom, and initiation. Lady Wisdom of Proverbs is understood by the movement to have intentional references to goddess imagery, and specifically, subtle puns alluding to her being based on Asherah. The word asheri (happy) and root derivations are used in remarkably high frequency during her portions of the scripture, and Wisdom is called a "tree of life", living in a house with "seven pillars" (pillars sometimes being used to allude to trees and to asherah poles). She is also depicted standing at the crossroads, similar to the goddess of magic, Hecate. The Talmud deepens this association in the movement by stating that two women standing at the crossroads are surely doing magic. This imagery inspired a song made by Taya Shere. Lady Wisdom is also depicted standing at the city gates, where shrines once stood. Some in the movement also believe the "house" of Wisdom in several passages refers to a shrine. The wise women in Hebrew literature also have some subtext implying they may have been oracles, such as the woman of Avel and the woman of Tekoa, who lived during David's reign. These women are also skilled political negotiators. Serach bat Asher is another important figure; in Jewish folklore, she was granted either several hundred years of life or is immortal, and helps Moses prove to the Hebrews that he was sent by God. Asnat Barzani, sometimes caller the first female rabbi, is also held in high regard. She was the head of a yeshiva, and Kurdish Jewish legends say she could perform miracles.

The mourning woman (mekonenet) is represented by professional mourners in Jewish history, Rachel, the wife of Pinchas, and the grieving Mother Zion. It represents the pain and truth of change. The Book of Lamentations is important here, especially as it is believed portions were written by professional mourning women. Professional mourning women existed in Jewish communities until the Medieval period, but gradually became an object of scorn and fear by men, who associated women with uncleanness and bad luck in a funerary context. In the early modern period, women were allowed in burial societies (who prepare bodies), but were no longer allowed to do public mourning. It is still controversial in some communities to allow women to say Mourner's Kaddish, give eulogies, attend funerals, and publicly mourn. It is also thought that the ancient annual mourning custom done for Jephthah's daughter was done in caves, and that this may have originally been connected to some form of goddess cult. The Shekinah, Rachel's spirit, and "Mother Zion" are also depicted in Jewish religious literature mourning the Babylonian exile.

The prophetess (neviah) is represented by Miriam the adult prophet, Deborah, Huldah, and the Levitical drummers who danced in Temple processions. It represents inspiration, prophecy, ecstatic experience, truth, and the reveal of hidden information. Interestingly, the word for shrine (devir) shares a root with the name Devorah; her palm tree's location being mentioned with high specificity, and the verb "went up" being used to refer to traveling there, may indicate she indeed controlled some form of shrine. The movement literature also connects this to Rebecca's maid, Deborah, who accompanies her to "seek God" and is associated with a sacred tree (Allon-Bakhut), suggesting that Deborah may have been a title for an oracle associated with trees. The movement notes that Deborah and Miriam both sing chants after battle. In a historical analysis of how Judaism came to be, it is often thought that these sections represent an early tradition of war prophetesses that encouraged raiding parties. Huldah is noted to act as an affirmation of Josiah's reforms and the attacks on polytheism and religious rites outside the control of the Jerusalemite Temple. This is seen as a potential co-opting of prophetesses, and even as propaganda to convince the public (who were slow to relinquish goddesses and priestesses) to support the reforms. Prophetesses are also attested in Roman-era texts, both in the Sibylline Oracles (attributed to the possibly Jewish Sambathe and portions of which were likely written by Jews) and in gentile mockery of Jewish women dream interpreters associated with trees. The Talmud lists Sarah, Miriam, Deborah, Hannah, Abigail, Huldah, and Esther as prophetesses, though it is ambivalent toward them. The Talmud also records the idea that, to this day, it is possible to hear a "bat kol" —a prophetic whisper whose name means "daughter of a divine voice". The movement notes that it was historically common among Kabbalists and early Hasidim for women to have prophetic dreams and visions and to be possessed by spirits.

The shrinekeeper (tzovah) is represented by the Shekinah, women who once served at the entrance to the mishkan, the women who baked bread and poured wine for the Queen of Heaven, Eve, Lilith, and Ruth. It represents divination, sexuality, and self-affirmation. The women who served at the Mishkan (called tzovot, a root that refers to priestly service) donated their copper mirrors to make the washbasin of the Tabernacle. The association of these women with serving the Mishkan (where God speaks to mortals) and the mirrors suggests that the mirrors may have had some divinatory significance. The specific service at doorways is given significance, supposing the tzovot had a gatekeeping role. The root for "tzovah" (singular of tzovot) also is used to refer to both priests involved in cultic tasks and armies. Some other ancient Near Eastern religions had images of women placed in doorways as protectors of shrines, or female guardians who accompanied sacred objects into battle. Post-Temple, the movement literature talks about how the home table was considered the new altar (along with prayer as the new sacrifice) in early Rabbinic thought, and draws a connection between the tzovot and the role of women at the table and home, the way they light candles for Shabbat as the priests once did in the Temple, praying over daily tasks as priests once did, etc. They also connect it to the role of women as singers, cantors, and synagogue leaders through time. In the movement, some participants in rituals will serve as gatekeepers: greeting guests, washing their hands with fragrant oil, and otherwise bringing them into the ritual space.

The witch or shamaness (ba'alat ov) is represented by the Witch of Endor and the mother of Abaye. It represents connection to the ancestors, the ability to journey to other worlds, and the power to heal and to shift reality. While mediumship (particularly involving the dead) is condemned in traditional Jewish thought, there are arguments against this condemnation, and the continued use of the term ba'alat ov by the Kohenets seems to be inspired by practices like the old Ashkenazi women's custom of making soul candles for the High Holy Days. The wick was unrolled around graves and then used to make candles while reciting prayers for the holy dead, hoping the donation of the candles would stir the holy dead to protect them in the coming year. The movement also mentions customs such as how orphan brides invite the spirits of their deceased parents to their weddings, well-known incantations used in daily life, and women's grave visitation in Sephardic custom. The double standard around who is allowed to divine, interpret signs, do "magic", and speak with spirits is brought into particularly sharp contrast when discussing this archetype. As the movement points out, priests, sages, and prophets do these forbidden things, as does anyone who speaks with an angel, but they are not condemned for it.

The seeker (doreshet) is represented by Rebeccah, who is struggling with pregnancy. It represents pilgrimage, interpreters, and scholars. This path is inspired by pilgrimage and the question that leads many women to the Kohenet movement. It is also inspired by the women in the monastic Jewish Therapeutae community, who, Philo says, commonly remain virgins, and by Ethiopian Jewish nuns, called batiwa/melekuse. Unfortunately, such nuns no longer exist in the Ethiopian community.

The lover (ohevet) is represented by Ruth seducing Boaz, the golden cherubim (who the Talmud claims were sculpted in a sexual embrace), and the protagonist of Song of Songs. It represents passion, desire, sharing oneself, connection, and willingness. While partly evoking the kedeisha, the movement literature acknowledges that the kedeishot may not have actually been sacred prostitutes (as there is debate over whether temple prostitution ever occurred) and that their being called such in scripture may be ancient slander. It is also inspired by the women of the ancient Tu B'Av festivals, where young women wore borrowed white dresses and danced and drummed. Men would go among the dancers to select romantic partners. Sex acts undertaken in a sacred context are often viewed with suspicion in Jewish religious literature, though they occasionally appear in positive contexts. Mainly, God is presented as the metaphorical groom of Israel, or as the husband of the Shekinah, or as the one to whom married couples are connected in some way.

The fool (leitzanit) is represented by tricksters, such as Rebecca tricking Issac to get Jacob's blessing, Rachel stealing her father's terafim and sitting on them while claiming she is menstruating, or by Sarah laughing at Issac's birth announcement. It represents laughter, cleverness, fearlessness, difficult truths, and perfect honesty. Some Talmudic sages are described telling "fox-fables", juggling, and doing other entertaining acts.

Yalta and Beruria are women in the Talmud who use comedy to mock disrespectful and misogynistic men. When a visiting sage refuses the request of Yalta's husband to include her in the wine blessing by saying women are completely inferior to men and only vessels for men's life force, Yalta goes to the store room and breaks 400 jars of wine to mock him. The "wine" that fills the blessing cup of metaphorically the womb of women; the sage's "blessing cup" (life force) is meaningless without the wine to fill it. The visiting sage mocks her again by saying the wine she spilled should count as her blessing (implying it might as well be spilled because it does her no good). Yalta says that his fertility is only useful to create vermin. Beruria also mocks sages known for their misogyny by using their words against them.

Many marriage customs also historically involved women telling dirty jokes, playing pranks, or play-fighting. Clowns, troubadours, and jesters were hired for weddings too, who were usually men but sometimes women. The film version of the Dybbuk portrays such an entertainer, a woman called a badchanit. The badchanit directs a scene where wedding guests playfully frighten the bride by pretending to be ghosts, ghouls, and demons. Later, she dresses up as Death, teasing the bride (Leah'le) before dancing with her. The Dance of Death as performed in the film was a tradition at European Jewish weddings before the Holocaust, and served as a sobering reminder during the festivities and as a ritual to ward the real death. Various comedic dances and jokes continue to appear at some Jewish weddings. They also form a large part of Purim celebrations.

The weaver (oreget) is represented by Asherah, and the women who spun the goats’ hair for the Tabernacle. It represents creation and the bringing together of disparate elements. It is based on the virgin Temple weavers known to have been a part of the Jerusalemite Temple up until its end, and who had possibly equal status to the priests who made bread and incense in the Temple complex. Rabbinic-era texts directly compare these weavers to priests and associate them with divinity. Even centuries later, in the Medieval and modern periods, Jewish women often embroidered and wove synagogue parochets, Torah mantles, and Torah binders, which the Kohenets view with renewed significance. Asherah, here and elsewhere, is understood not so much as a separate figure but as another face of God (similar to the existing and fairly normalized God-Shekinah relationship in Rabbinic Judaism). She is associated with weavers, as 2 Kings 23:6-7 specifically mentions the destruction of the Asherah housed in the Jerusalemite Temple and the things woven for her. Further, some scholars argue that Asherah was associated with weaving.

== Organizations ==
The Kohenet movement was initially managed by the Kohenet Institute, which operated from 2003 to 2023. A new organization, Beit Kohenet, was founded in the same year of the previous organization's closure. Both organizations are primarily online.

=== Kohenet Institute ===
The Kohenet Institute, also known as the Kohenet Hebrew Priestess Institute, was an American Jewish organization that trained women to be Jewish spiritual leaders, primarily in the Kohenet movement of Judaism. The institute was founded in November 2005 by Rabbi Jill Hammer and Holly Taya Shere. It held its first training program August 14–20, 2006, at the Elat Chayyim Retreat Center in Accord, New York. In July 2009, the institute ordained for the first time 11 women as kohanot (priestesses). As of early 2021 the institute had graduated almost 100 women as priestesses. Ordination required the completion of a three-year training and program including 13 paths which explored different "female archetypes".

The organization was criticized by some Jewish leaders for its alleged embrace of pagan rituals. The movement itself is heterogeneous, with its founders taking a "soft monotheism" stance, as they themselves are monotheistic, but never have tried to keep polytheists away from their spaces. The primary founder, Jill Hammer, has expressed concern in response that the accusation of "paganism" is used to shut down theological discussion, and may be applied to people who simply use feminine language for God, and who connect to God through feminine imagery.

Amidst conflict between leadership, the Institute closed in 2023.

=== Beit Kohenet ===
A new organization, Beit Kohenet, was founded in the same year of the previous organization's closure. Both organizations are primarily online. The Kohenet movement has since re-organized under Beit Kohenet, with Rabbi Hammer as an active participant and leader. They currently have 5 different kinds of monthly meetings, and a roster of classes (mainly offered online).

== Reception ==
Kohenet movement members have been accused of heresy, paganism, antifeminism, creating a new religion, and perversion. In response, Hammer says that terms like magic and paganism are political, and that misogyny is a large factor in how detractors view the group. However, the movement does embrace those who identify as Jewish witches. Most kohenets do not identify as pagan, though the organization has a "soft monotheism" approach and does not outright reject pagans. Some kohenets do have provocative religious beliefs, including worship of Asherah and pseudo-historical claims of ancient hidden knowledge. The prayer book released by the movement also removes passages in traditional readings that condemn other religion's gods, though this is not necessarily saying they should be worshipped, so much as it is trying to be respectful of other religions and accept that they also have wisdom. Hammer has questioned the staunch resistance to anything accused of idolatry or paganism, the religious chauvinism and hypocrisy involved, and how readily people equate it to incest or murder. She cites accepted Jewish literature pointing out a greater tolerance has historically existed in the minds of some Jews.

Dibur Acher, on the Jewschool blog in 2010, criticised the Kohenets claiming they assert that "The divine feminine can’t be warlike, that’s a male descriptor, God can’t be loving and merciful, those are female traits, the Shekhina is tied to 'earth', i.e. the material world, and so we 'celebrate' her that way. This is the same old 'men are mind and women are body” 'that has been used for centuries to limit women." This does not reflect kohenet literature, which explicitly discusses the way Goddess can be war like and wrathful, and explicitly criticizes the idea that the divine feminine must only be gentle and loving, and the idea that "men are mind and women are body". She also dismisses that some women have a negative relationship to traditionally masculine forms of Jewish scholarship and leadership to the point of some kohenets calling religious literature "men's texts". This is despite these texts centering men and patriarchal attitudes, and that interaction with them has been gatekept to men and still is in some communities. It is also despite the fact that Jews overwhelmingly use masculine terms for God, and not neutral ones. Dibur Acher summed it up as "It’s simply not true that the master’s tools will never take down the master’s house."

Liberal Judaism is more open to the Kohenets existing as a legitimate group. Jewish Renewal has given it explicit support. Jewish women who felt alienated and explored other religions have found kohenet practices renewed their faith.

== See also ==
- Semitic neopaganism
- Witchcraft and divination in the Hebrew Bible
- Folk Judaism
- Jewish feminism
- Priestess
- Kabbalah
