= Semitic neopaganism =

Religions attempting to reconstruct ancient Semitic religions

Semitic neopaganism is a group of religions based on or attempting to reconstruct the ancient Semitic religions, mostly practiced among Jews in the United States.

== Jewish neopaganism ==
The notion of historical Israelite or Jewish polytheism was popularized in the United States during the 1960s by Raphael Patai in The Hebrew Goddess, focusing on the cult of goddesses such as the cult of Asherah in Solomon's Temple.

During the growth of Neopaganism in the United States throughout the 1970s, a number of minor Canaanite or Israelite-oriented groups emerged. Most contained syncretistic elements from Western esotericism.

Forms of Neopagan witchcraft religions inspired by the Semitic milieu, such as Jewitchery, may also be enclosed within the Semitic neopagan movement. These groups are particularly influenced by Jewish feminism, focusing on the goddess cults of the Israelites.

A notable contemporary Levantine Neopagan group is known as "Am Ha Aretz" (עם הארץ, lit. "People of the Land", a rabbinical term for uneducated and religiously unobservant Jews), "AmHA" for short, based in Israel. This group grew out of Ohavei Falcha, "Lovers of the Soil", a movement founded in the late 19th century.

Elie Sheva, according to her own testimony, an "elected leader of AmHA," reportedly founded an American branch of the group, known as the Primitive Hebrew Assembly.

Beit Asherah ("House of Asherah") was one of the first Jewish neopagan groups, founded in the early 1990s by Stephanie Fox, Steven Posch, and Magenta Griffiths. Magenta Griffiths is High Priestess of the Beit Asherah coven and a former board member of the Covenant of the Goddess.

Semitic neopagan movements have also been reported in Israel and in Lebanon.

=== Kohenet movement ===
In 2006, rabbi Jill Hammer founded the Kohenet Hebrew Priestess Institute, which has a stated mission to "reclaim and innovate embodied, earth-based feminist Judaism", inspired by pre-Israelite Semitic religion priestesses such as Enheduanna, who was a devotee of the goddess Inanna. The word kohenet is the feminine declension of kohen, the priestly lineage in Jewish tradition. The ordination of "Hebrew priestesses" has led to some consternation in the Jewish community, with some feeling that the Kohenet movement is not solely Jewish due to the presence of aspects of paganism that are incompatible with the Torah. The syncretic aspects of this religious movement have been characterized as "goddess worship", but supporters say that the movement expresses a creative approach to problems posed by non-egalitarian streams of Judaism. Similar organizations include the Lilith Institute (also known as Mishkan Shekhinah), an organization and community more overtly aligned with Wicca and other feminist/goddess-centered neo-pagan movements than the Kohenet Institute.

=== Jewitches ===
A related movement is "Jewitches" (sometimes styled as JeWitches), Jews – often but not exclusively women – blending Jewish heritage with elements of witchcraft, folk magic, and at times including elements of Semitic neo-paganism.

Some "Jewitches" express their desire to document and revitalize ritual practices that were historically suppressed, obscured, or abandoned, as a means of cultural preservation in response to persecution, assimilation, or marginalization.

== See also ==
- Ashurism
- Canaanism
- Christo-Paganism
- Folk Judaism
- Jewish Buddhist
- Practical Kabbalah
- Witchcraft and divination in the Hebrew Bible
