= Madge Weinstein =

Fictional Internet personality

Yeast Radio
- Madge Weinstein with poster design by Fausto Fernós
- Genre: Comedy

Cast and voices
- Hosted by: Madge Weinstein (Richard Bluestein)

Publication
- Original release: December 2004
- Updates: Daily (mostly)

Related
- Website: yeastradio.com

Madge Bertha Weinstein is a fictional Internet personality who maintains Yeast Radio, which has developed a cult following and was among the 50 most-subscribed-to podcasts in 2005. Weinstein is the creation and alter ego of underground filmmaker Richard Bluestein and was described by USA Today as "representative of the type of over-the-top content that would never see the light of day at a mainstream media outlet".

Although Weinstein is a fictional character (and never admitted as such), the majority of opinions, social-political commentary and oblique characteristics of her personality are clearly reflective of Bluestein's own. In essence, Weinstein is both an extension and distortion of Bluestein's actual personality.

== Character history ==
Weinstein is an outspoken breast cancer survivor and opinionated Jewish lesbian activist. She is a Vassar College graduate, a "woman of Luna" and claims to be a co-founder of the Lilith Fair. She was also the band manager of the now disbanded riot grrrl rock group, 'Goddess Riot Juice'. She is the self-professed "Margaret Mead of podcasting" as she is an amateur cultural anthropologist who, in her free time, studies the sordid sexual activities of homosexual men. She is well known for her advocacy on a variety of women's issues including her long tenure as a spokeswoman on behalf of women suffering from vaginal yeast. Weinstein also suffers from food allergies and fibromyalgia.

Weinstein is the daughter of Irving Weinstein, a funeral director and owner of Weinstein & Schlump Funeral Homes. She grew up in the Grand Concourse in the borough of the Bronx in New York City. She is the former lover of Ethel Merman (although she tends to exaggerate the details of their now infamous 1967 tryst during Ethel's daughter's funeral) and has had affairs with Martina Navratilova, Ellen DeGeneres, k.d. lang, Melissa Etheridge and Rosie O'Donnell. In her youth, she claims to have performed oral sex on Nancy Reagan which she now regrets. Weinstein's most notable lesbian relationship was with Gussie Iscowicz (the alter ego of Bluestein's late partner Juan Montealegre), an elderly hairdresser living in Miami, Florida who suffered from Alzheimer's. For many years, Weinstein edited gay pornography for an urban audience (for a company known only as 'the Dorm'). She currently resides in Miami, Florida with her Italian greyhound Trotsky.

== Biography ==
Weinstein co-manages the sister site, Insane Films, which features personal video blogs of Madge's alter ego, Richard Bluestein, as well as features by underground filmmakers and miscellaneous visual content. Insane Films is one of the earliest videoblogs ever created, originating sometime in 2000. However, Madge Weinstein's fame grew largely from her indie podcast Yeast Radio, which began in late November 2004 . Weinstein gained notoriety for her viral video, Cooking With Madge: Lesbians On Acid, which featured a disheveled Madge and her unstable, ambiguously gendered friends attempting to cook "les beans" while high on LSD. A pioneer of the podcasting medium, Adam Curry, helped promote the show in its early life. In late April 2005, Weinstein created Yeast2, a free-form experimental channel in which "anyone (could) contribute to the strange, ugly, pretty macabra [sic] and surreal." Yeast2 closed in 2008.

In early July 2005, Weinstein became one of the first members of Adam Curry's PodShow and was featured heavily in the program, which aired on Sirius Satellite Radio from 6-10 p.m. EST on weekdays before the company's ties with the radio network were controversially severed on May 1, 2007. Weinstein's contract with PodShow ended in April 2008.

Around the same time, Madge Weinstein co-created Eat This Hot Show a collaborative podcast featuring five notable members of the ever-growing "queercast" community: Weinstein, Ragan Fox, Wanda Wisdom, Fausto Fernos and his partner Marc Felion. However, Fausto and Marc were expelled from the show after ten episodes due to internal conflicts with fellow hosts, and the three featured a weekly guest in the episodes following. The show eventually dissipated in this format although, in April 2008, the show was revived with Madge, Wanda and new co-host Auntie Vera Charles. As of 2014, after another hiatus and the departure of Auntie Vera Charles, new episodes are being recorded sporadically with current co-hosts Ragan Fox and Wanda Wisdom. Madge Weinstein and Wanda Wisdom also co-created the online community Qpodder.org, which collects podcasts by gay, lesbian, bisexual and transgender people or characters. Sibling site NellyGator.com allows listeners to subscribe to a single RSS feed containing all podcast episodes from the members of Qpodder. In mid-October 2005, Weinstein, a self-described "pioneering lesbian," began heavily promoting the medium of queer video blogging to coincide with the advent of the video iPod. Her new endeavor Faggregator.com does to videoblogging what Nellygator did for podcasting, and features a single page which houses all the video material submitted by members of the Qpodder community.

Bluestein experienced two personal losses in 2006. Juan Montealegre died on February 11, 2006, after a battle with cancer. Not long thereafter, on May 2, 2006, his 14-year-old dog Chauncey, a heavy fixture on the show in its early days including a memorable episode where Weinstein angrily cleaned up his feces, also died. On September 27, 2006, Richard Bluestein announced on Yeast Radio that he was retiring the character Madge and taking over hosting duties himself due to creative concerns. Madge was reported to be in a hospital in Guadalajara, Mexico, where she received adjustable gastric band surgery for her ongoing weight problem. The surgery went horribly wrong, leaving her in a critical condition. Madge eventually recovered and returned to the show on November 7, 2006.

In early January 2008, with the threat of her expiring PodShow contract, Weinstein relaunched Yeast Radio as a live show, airing on her website from 10:00 CT on Fridays. The live format continued until the end of May 2008 when Weinstein decided to return to a more free-form, unscheduled format. In early 2009, Weinstein resumed streaming live shows sporadically. The 1000th episode of Yeast Radio was streamed live on February 12, 2010.

Weinstein's queer punk ethics and her podcast's content, strong, coarse language and stream-of-consciousness structure have made her a controversial icon within the more conservative podcasting community. Her show serves as an ongoing protest against censorship, the commercialization of mainstream radio and the continued marginalization of gays and lesbians by the growing monoculture.

== Recurring guest characters ==
Weinstein features a variety of vulgar but eccentric characters on her show. Some frequent contributors:

- Sylvia Browne, a famous psychic who is now a bloated corpse, who could never quite find her purse. Her spirit lives on and is continuously celebrated by Madge Weinstein in the form of audio clips.
- Berbacia Clemons, a Los Angeles-based "big, black, bloated, bisexual, bipolar, overweight blesbian blacktress" who sporadically guests on the show to "peel open the pussy lips of Hollywood", allowing the audience to have a "peek inside". She is often delusional and obsesses over certain celebrities, in particular former talk show host Star Jones (whom she views as her stalker and her "only competition"), her "lesbian lover" Oprah Winfrey and her "close friends" Michael Jackson and Elizabeth Taylor.
- Cher, the glamorous and unhinged singer, actress, part time yoga teacher and close friend of Madge. Talks constantly and proudly about her transgender son "Chazzie".
- Grizelda, a panty-pooping marathon runner and Madge's close friend who shares her interests in obesity and the bizarre. Grizelda (Shishaldin Hanlen) is also a provocative multimedia performance artist, world cake-eating champion and sports coach who made headlines in 2004 for invoking an obscure clause in the French civil code and petitioning the government for permission to marry the long deceased French surrealist poet Comte de Lautréamont.
- Victoria LaMarr, a schizophrenic transgender crack whore with multiple personalities who appeared heavily in Weinstein's infamous Lesbians On Acid trilogy and in early episodes of Yeast Radio. She went on to play a larger part in the Feast of Fools podcast. Victoria (Matthew Bogseth) died from complications of HIV/AIDS in November 2013.
- Rachel Kann, an emo/gothic performance poet and 'new age' spiritual healer. Her trademark is her deep, robust voice with inflections that suggest she is continuously relieving her bowels. Madge's chemistry and banter with her is very popular with listeners and she enjoys a cult following.
- Ali Mahajani, also known as Ali My Vagina, an Indian man who enjoys sticking unusual objects in his urethra. He is estranged from his amputee wife after a complication from sexual intercourse. He soon went on to play a large role in Cheryl's Whorehole podcast and is part of the That Is Real Good Tech podcast with Rob Average Penis.
- Andy Melton, later known as Schrockbella Mortenstein, a housebound gay twenty-something with the unique predicament of hyper morbid obesity. From his father's house in Tennessee, he formerly hosted the podcast "Andy Not Andrew" and unsuccessfully launched the program "Sissy Fried" under the pseudonym, Declan Channing. He has since left his home and podcasting to pursue a romantic relationship with a man known to listeners only as 'Yellow Fatty'.
- Cheryl Trig Merkowski, a self-described beautiful, paedophilic 25-year-old woman, smoker and owner of three fourths of a lung. Though she makes a point to introduce herself as such, it seems clear that she is much older than she lets on. Cheryl speaks obsessively about her prolapsed vagina, feces, urine, abortions, semen, African Americans, her prized Cadillac Cimarron and the children at the daycare centre that she runs. She has a croaky and aged voice, the results of excessive tobacco smoking and lung cancer. She also tans obsessively to the point that her skin has become very leathery. She worked under Oprah Winfrey (with whom she has a bizarre, masochistic relationship) and was caught up in a global conspiracy of celebrities pooping their panties. She has many famous 'sisters', including psychic Sylvia Browne, former governor Jan Brewer and controversial celebrity chef Paula Deen. Originally only appearing on the show sporadically she has grown to become a full-fledged co-host. In February 2014, her music video "Walls Fall Out", a song about vaginal and anal prolapse, went viral.
- The Abortion Hotline Girls, a series of bewildered anti-abortion hotline workers who befriend and attempt to help poor Cheryl and Debra through their various pregnancies and troubles.
- Hagatha von Taterbugs, a gleefully disgusting HIV positive drag queen with borderline personality disorder who hangs out in public restrooms and drinks sewage. Her trashy exploits and long history of atrocities have shocked and astounded even Madge and Cheryl. Cheryl despises Hagatha and undercuts her at every turn.
- Debra Wilkerson, an elderly, insane Christian woman who thinks Madge and Cheryl need to "get saved". She had a complete mental breakdown after the television show The Facts Of Life was cancelled and talks endlessly about "Natalie", "Jo" and the "GURLS". After smoking copious amounts of chiffon, she developed multiple personalities, most notably as Heather Feather, a South Californian teen girl who frequents phone sex lines and has many strange boyfriends. Heather's most notable boyfriend is Fill, a foul mouthed, mentally handicapped pervert who talks obsessively about his 'cream'. She also has a gay grandson who burns crosses in her backyard in tribute to Madonna. Like Cheryl, she has grown to become a full-time co-host on the show.
- Kathy, a dominant transsexual lesbian whom the gurrrlls randomly found through a phone sex hotline. Kathy is borderline bankrupt and not-so-secretly wants Heather's sugardaddy funding. However, Heather eventually became homeless, much to Kathy's dismay, and lost all the money forcing Heather to live in her car. Kathy constantly berates Heather for being mildly retarded in nature. From the phone calls between Kathy and Heather, it is clear that Kathy needs Jesus. Not to mention needing to learn what being a lesbian is all about...
- Angela Beasley, a sassy worker at Kerry Laundry in Oakland Park, Florida whom the guuuurlls like to mess with on occasion. She charges 95¢ a pound for laundry and refuses to wash anything with feces or BM in it. Angela has a boss named Ms. Tracy whom can never "guess what." Ms. Beasley also has a fetish for lobster dinner, and never received her voucher for one due to Matt Peter's unfortunate demise. Odds are Angela is still waiting expectantly for "Listenin' Radio Radio Yeast" to send her her complementary lobster dinner...not realizing that her waiting is as pointless as her waiting for Godot.

The show regularly features audio clips involving psychic Sylvia Browne, feminist writer Helen Gurley Brown, Big Meets Bigger, My Strange Addiction and other television programs about morbid obesity and bizarre personal habits.

Weinstein has also interviewed political activist Cindy Sheehan, Wigstock founder Lady Bunny, Democracy Now! reporter Amy Goodman, pioneer of the transgressive art movement Nick Zedd, collaborative documentary filmmaker Kent Bye of The Echo Chamber Project and the experimental, underground filmmakers Usama Alshaibi and Kristie Alshaibi. The show frequently features original compositions from Taylor E. Ross (described as Madge's "cunt doctor"), the mysterious "Mr. Zeeche" and Dave from the Chub Creek's podcast. Because of her prominence within the community, Madge also regularly features fellow queer podcasters on her show such as Ragan Fox, Wanda Wisdom, Auntie Vera Charles, Lady Raptastic and Rebecca Nay.
