= Richard Bluestein =

American entertainer

- Born: March 30, 1967 (age 59); Evanston, Illinois, U.S.
- Occupations: Entertainer, performance artist, videographer
- Notable work: Yeast Radio

Richard Bluestein (born March 30, 1967) is an American entertainer, performance artist, and videographer. His most notorious persona is Madge Weinstein, a "bloated, Jewish lesbian" who hosts the indie podcast Yeast Radio, which Bluestein writes and produces.

== Biography ==
Bluestein was born in Evanston, Illinois. After working in the health care industry for several years and dabbling in radio hosting in Amsterdam, he moved to Chicago, Illinois in 1998 and started becoming involved with the underground film and performance scene. In 2000, he set up the website Insane Films, one of the earliest video blogs ever created. Around this time, he worked as a director of photography for independent filmmaker Kristi Alshaibi's Other People's Mirrors, an indie art film which explored adult taboos and helped refine Bluestein's artistic talent.

Bluestein developed the popular alter ego of Madge Weinstein to be featured in a This is Spinal Tap-esque mockumentary about feminist riot grrrls and their lesbian Jewish manager. The short film remained unfinished and unreleased until February 2006, when he finally uploaded some footage to Yeast Radio under the title The Origin of Madge. Soon after, he began performing this character in drag with the Feast of Fools cabaret act and in art galleries and underground theatres.

In November 2004, Bluestein discovered the growing podcasting community. Seeing it as a perfect medium for expression, he launched Yeast Radio from his Chicago living room. A month later, he sent a demo to former MTV VJ and self-professed "podfather" Adam Curry which sparked Bluestein's professional career in the podcasting and radio medium

Bluestein's transgressive form of comedy has drawn controversy from the conservative podcasting community. His show was described by USA Today as "representative of the type of over-the-top content that would never see the light of day at a mainstream media outlet".
