= E. M. Broner =

American writer (1927–2011)

- Born: Esther Frances Masserman; July 8, 1927; Detroit, Michigan, U.S.
- Died: June 21, 2011 (aged 83); New York City, U.S.
- Spouse: Robert Broner (m. 1948; died 2010)

Academic background
- Education: BA in sociology and; MA in creative writing from Wayne State University; Ph.D. with a specialization in religion from the Union Institute & University

Academic work
- Institutions: Wayne State University; Sarah Lawrence College
- Notable works: The Women's Haggadah

Esther M. Broner, best known as E. M. Broner (née Masserman; July 8, 1927 – June 21, 2011), was a Jewish American feminist author.

== Early life and education ==
Broner was born Esther Frances Masserman on July 8, 1927 in Detroit, Michigan. She attended Wayne State University and received a bachelor's degree in English and a master's degree in creative writing. She received her PhD in religion at what is now the Union Institute & University.

== Career ==
Broner returned to Wayne State University to teach English in 1964 and also taught at Sarah Lawrence College.

In 1976, Broner's first women-only Passover seder was held in her New York City apartment. It was led by her, with 13 women attending, including Gloria Steinem, Letty Cottin Pogrebin, and Phyllis Chesler. Broner and Naomi Nimrod created a women's haggadah for use at this seder. In the spring of 1976 Broner published this “Women’s Haggadah” in Ms. magazine, later publishing it as a book in 1994; this haggadah is meant to include women where only men had been mentioned in traditional haggadahs, and it features the Wise Women, the Four Daughters, the Women's Questions, the Women's Plagues, and a women-centric “Dayenu”. A Women's Seder has been held with the Women's Haggadah every year since 1976, and women-only seders are now held by some congregations as well. Broner led her Women's Seder for 30 years.

She was the recipient of a National Endowment for the Arts fellowship and a Wonder Woman Foundation award.

Her papers are held at Brandeis University.

== Personal life and death ==
E. M. Broner was married to Robert Broner, a printmaker and painter, in 1948, and they had four children together. He died the year before her.

She died on June 21, 2011, in Manhattan.

== Works ==
- Broner, E. M. (1985). Weave of Women. Indiana University Press. ISBN 978-0253203540.
- "Body memories" and "Sitting Shiva for a lost love" in Umansky, Ellen M.; Ashton, Dianne, eds. (1992). Four Centuries of Jewish Women's Spirituality: A Sourcebook. Boston: Beacon Press. ISBN 9780807036136.
- —; Nimrod, Naomi (1993). The Telling: The Story of a Group of Jewish Women Who Journey to Spirituality through Community and Ceremony. HarperSanFrancisco. ISBN 9780060608170.
- —; Nimrod, Naomi (1994). The Women's Haggadah. HarperSanFrancisco. ISBN 9780060611439.
- — (1994). Mornings and Mourning: A Kaddish Journal. HarperSanFrancisco. ISBN 9780060610715.

Broner had also written radio scripts for National Public Radio and plays. Her musical, “Higginson: An American Life,” premiered June 17, 2005, by the Michigan Opera Theatre (Broner, book & lyrics; Mort Zieve, music).
