= Priestess (religious honorific) =

Woman who performs sacred rites for a religion

A priestess is a woman authorized to perform the sacred rites and or duties of a religious organization, often used for pagan, and witch-related titles, or positions. However, whilst very rare, some Christian-based women also use the title. Within the Christian framework, the vast majority of ordained women either use "Priest", "Pastor", "Minister", "Deacon", "Deaconess", or "Elder". It is most commonly used to describe ancient traditions, most commonly Pagan, but also including a time period in Christian Europe where noble Christian women used the title. Though many Wiccan, Pagan, Druidic, and even some Christian women use this title as a religious title once ordained, even in the current present.

== 14 Historical Women who were Christian Priestesses (Sacerdos) from the 6th-13th century in Europe ==
Noble Abbesses and Clergy who held the title of High Priestess (Sacerdos Maxima) within Christianity

Aedda: Documented as a High Priestess

Elfrida: Documented as a High Priestess

Adelburga: Documented as a High Priestess

Sexburga: Documented as a High Priestess

Matilda: Church Nobility, Abbess of Quedlinburg, Documented as a High Priestess

Adelheid: Church Nobility, Abbess of Quedlinburg, Documented as a High Priestess

Sophia of Quedlinburg: Church Nobility, Abbess of Quedlinburg, Documented as a High Priestess

Abbess with the title Great High Priestess (Sacerdos Magna)

Beatrix: Church Nobility, Abbess of Suselic, Documented as a Great High Priestess

Religious Women who led Abbeys with the title Priestess (Sacerdos)

Roswitha: Abbess of Gandersheim, Documented as a Priestess.

Gerberga the second: Abbess of Gandersheim, Documented as a Priestess.

Sophia of Gebstedt: Abbess of Gebstedt, Documented as a Priestess.

Sophia of Paderborn: Abbess of Paderborn, Documented as a Priestess.

Helica: Abbess of Passau, Documented as a Priestess.

Agnes of Bohemia: Abbess of Prague, Documented as a Priestess.

== Etymology ==
The etymology of priestess refers to a "woman who officiates in sacred rites, a female minister of religion". Its origin dates back to the 1690s, from the combination of priest and the suffix -ess. An earlier form, priestress (mid-15c. prēsteresse), is noted, according to an etymological description via an online Etymology Dictionary, Etymonline.

== Examples of use ==
- In ancient Roman Solana (Now modern Croatia) archaeologists and historians theorize with confidence that Women in the region, before ordination of women into priesthood was banned by the Catholic church, held positions equal to Priests with the gendered title being "Priestess".
- In the Pagan and Wiccan witchcraft cult and coven societies, the term Priestess or High Priestess, is taken extremely seriously as a title of a woman who is a teacher or leader of a coven or cult.
- A declared religious organization with the IRS, "The Church of Christian Spiritualism & Lifestyle", is a Non-denominational Christian ministry that is head shipped by a Christian Priestess.
- The Non-denominational religious organization The Universal Life Church Monastery, offers this "The ULC grants honorary religious titles to ministers across the faith spectrum. Printed on high-quality paper, they are perfect for display or framing-". Among these titles is Priestess as well as High Priestess.
- The Esoteric Interfaith Church est. 1987, has an "Esoteric Theological Seminary" Program that modern Pagans, Druids, Wiccans, or Spiritualists can use to become ordained as clergy. Amongst the titles in their "Other Minister Titles" section, is the "Esoteric Priestess" title.
- In ancient Akkadia, female clergy of their faith, were known as entu Priestesses.
- In ancient Egypt, women in clergy were called Priestesses.
- In ancient Rome, women who ran and helped run temples were called "Priestess".
