= Amy Steinberg =

American singer

- Born: July 17, 1973 (age 53)
- Origin: Massachusetts, United States
- Genres: Folk, pop-rock
- Occupation: Singer-songwriter
- Instruments: Piano, guitar, vocals,
- Years active: 1998–present
- Website: amysteinberg.net

Amy Steinberg is an American minister, singer, songwriter, musician, playwright and actress. She is an independent artist. Best known for her live performances, she blends together a mixture of music, comedy, and poetry. A student of the Science of Mind movement, her work has included musically directing at spiritual centers, writing songs for the Inspire Choir in Boca Raton, Florida and the One Love Choir in Charlotte, North Carolina which has brought marked spirituality into her work. She has performed at Agape International in Los Angeles, Center for Spiritual Living in Seattle, The Revelation Conference, the Michigan Womyn's Festival, and opening for artists including Alix Olson and Melissa Ferrick.

== Early life ==
Amy was born in Boston, Massachusetts. At age 8, her family moved to Sarasota, Florida, where she attended Booker High School for the Performing Arts. Classically trained on the piano from age 4, she studied at Boston Conservatory and American Musical and Dramatic Academy in New York City and has a degree in theater from Marymount Manhattan College.

== Music and Theater ==
Steinberg began singing original music in college and released her first record with the Amy Steinberg Band in 1999. She has since released nine albums independently, and written and performed four one-woman shows: Me, Me, Me, Me; Oh My God Don't Stop; Ever Expanding; and The Divine Miss Aim. After selling out and winning Patron's Pick at the 2005 Orlando International Fringe Theater Festival, Oh My God Don't Stop went on for successful runs in Tampa and West Palm Beach, Florida. It ran for three months at the Cuillo Centre for the Arts in 2008 to rave reviews. She won the Touring Act of the Year award from Songwriter Showcases of America in 2006, and Best Solo Performer from the Orlando Music Awards in 2000. She regularly tours the United States, performing in music festivals, Spiritual Centers, coffeehouses, and unschooling conferences. She currently tours in support of her newest record, Broken Open produced by Justin Beckler.

Her influences and inspirations are Bette Midler, Ani Difranco, Christy Snow, and George Carlin. Her shows are a mix of comedy, music, theater, and spirituality.

== Breaking the Moon ==
Steinberg wrote and produced a long one act, Breaking the Moon, about 7 teenagers in treatment for suicide and suicidal behaviors. It received praise from the press and is moving forward to productions in Asheville, North Carolina, Johnson City, Tennessee and New York, NY. Currently, the original cast album is being recorded at Sound Temple Studios.

== Art and Other Expressions ==
In 2001 Steinberg began turning her 'doodles' into multi-media pieces of fine art. Her work is mostly bright acrylic pieces with words inside the images (pictures below).

== Personal life ==
She is a licensed Religious Science minister. She has two chihuahuas, Ru and Tiki and three cats: Poppy, Baby cat and Sebastian. She lives with her partner in Asheville, North Carolina

== Discography ==
- Big Bang Breaks
- Shine, Be Glorious
- Broken Open
- Fall Down to Fly
- Must Be the Moon
- Raw Material from the Ethereal
- Emphatic at the Attic: LIVE!
- Clown Princess
- Sex with Amy
- 360 Hibiscus
- Sky High
