= Benay Lappe =

American rabbi

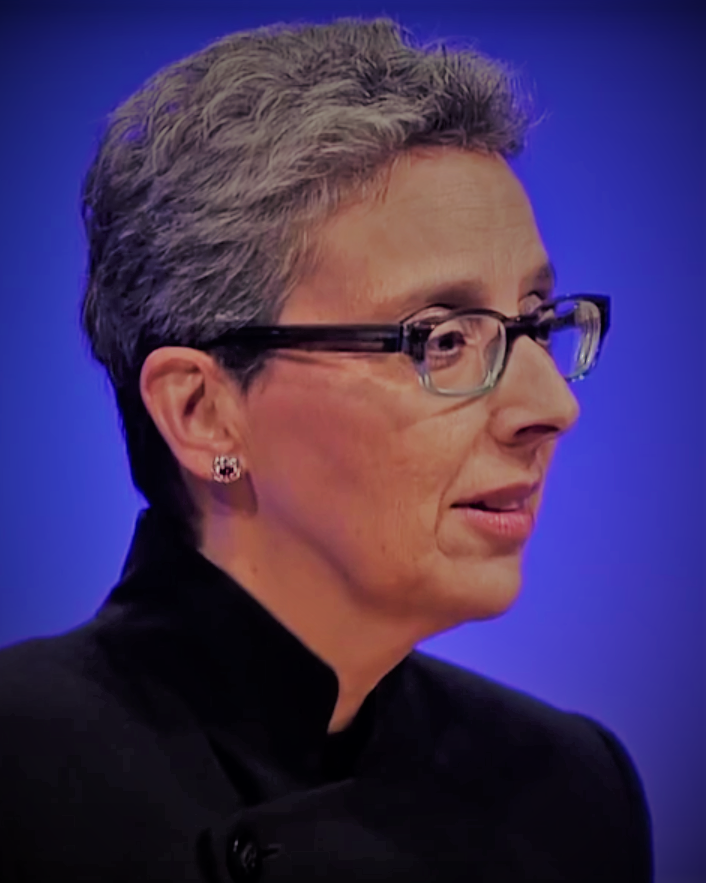
- Lappe in 2018
- Born: April 13, 1960 (age 66)
- Education: University of Illinois (B.A., M.A.); University of Judaism (M.A.); Jewish Theological Seminary of America (M.A.)

Benay Lappe (Hebrew: בִּנֵיי לַפֶּה/בנאי לאפה) is a rabbi and a teacher of Talmud in the United States. In 2016, Lappe was awarded the Covenant Award for innovation in Jewish education by the Covenant Foundation.

== Biography ==
Lappe was born on April 13, 1960, and grew up in Evanston, Illinois. She earned a BA in Italian literature and a MA in education from the University of Illinois, an MA in Hebrew letters from the University of Judaism, and an MA in rabbinic literature, as well as a semicha (rabbinic ordination) from the Jewish Theological Seminary of America.

Lappe is a professor at the University of Illinois, Temple University, American Jewish University, the Reconstructionist Rabbinical College, and the Graduate Theological Union's Richard S. Dinner Center for Jewish Studies affiliated with the University of California, Berkeley. She is professor of Talmud at the Hebrew Seminary in Skokie, Illinois, and serves as the President and Rosh Yeshiva of SVARA (Hebrew:סְבָרָא), a yeshiva she founded in Chicago in 2003. SVARA emphasizes radical empathy and innovation within Talmudic study and aims to empower learners to actively engage with and contribute to Jewish tradition.

Lappe was recognized on The Forward 50 2020 "list of American Jews who did remarkable things in this remarkable year".
