= Grand Performances =

Grand Performances (GP) is Southern California's largest presenter of free performing arts programs and a landmark nonprofit arts institution established with a primary focus of bringing together diverse audiences within the City of Los Angeles. Concerts are held during the summer from June through September with at least one performance per weekend, usually more. Established in 1986, Grand Performances is in the Financial District of Downtown Los Angeles in Two California Plaza.

Performances range from local artists to world musicians.

== National and international awards ==
- 2001 Special Achievement Award,
  Festival & Special Events
  International Downtown Association
- 2000 William Dawson Award,
  Programmatic Excellence
  Association of Performing Arts Presenters

== Local and regional awards ==
- 2002 Best Concerts Award
  Los Angeles Downtown News
- 2000 Rose Award Nomination
  The Downtown Breakfast Club
- 2000 Lester Horton Dance Award,
  Outstanding Production
  The Dance Resource Center of Greater Los Angeles
- 1999 Best Concerts Award,
  Dance Award,
  Outstanding Production
  The Los Angeles Downtown News
