= Ron Yitzchok Eisenman =

American rabbi and writer

Rabbi Ron Yitzchok Eisenman

Personal life
- Born: 1959 (age 66–67) Brooklyn, New York
- Education: Yeshivah of Flatbush; Yeshiva University; Yeshivat Har Etzion
- Occupation: Rabbi, professor and writer

Religious life
- Religion: Judaism
- Denomination: Orthodox

Jewish leader
- Position: Rabbi
- Synagogue: Congregation Ahavas Israel
- Began: 1997
- Residence: Passaic, New Jersey
- Semikhah: Joseph B. Soloveitchik

Rabbi Ron Yitzchok Eisenman (Hebrew: רון יצחק אייזנמן; born 1959) is an American Orthodox rabbi, teacher and author. The long-time rabbi of Congregation Ahavas Israel in Passaic, New Jersey, Eisenman is a professor at Lander College For Women (a division of Touro College), and a contributor to Mishpacha, a Jewish magazine.

Rabbi Eisenman has been outspoken in his support and defense of Orthodox sex abuse victims.

== Early life ==
Rabbi Ron Yitzchok Eisenman was born to an Orthodox Jewish family in Brooklyn, New York, where he was also raised. After attending the Yeshivah of Flatbush high school, he studied at Yeshiva University (YU). In 1979, following his second year there,Rabbi Eisenman traveled to Israel in order to study at Yeshivat Har Etzion, coming under the wing of its leader, Aharon Lichtenstein.Rabbi Eisenman, who used to carry the rabbi's sefarim (books) for him to the shiur (class), later said that Lichtenstein was one of the unique individuals who left a profound impact on him.

Rabbi Eisenman returned to the United States, where he received semikhah (rabbinic ordination—"Yoreh Yoreh") from Joseph B. Soloveitchik of YU, and "Yadin Yadin" from the Kollel L'dayanus of the Rabbi Isaac Elchanan Theological Seminary. He later went on to study at other yeshivas and kollelim in the United States and Israel.

== Career ==
In 1997, Rabbi Eisenman was appointed as the rabbi of Congregation Ahavas Israel in Passaic, New Jersey. Under his leadership, the synagogue had grown to the point where it hosted forty minyanim (prayer groups) a day, catering to the needs of 250 families in 2009. With a following of approximately one quarter of Passaic's Jewish population, he is one of the most prominent rabbis in the city. Rabbi Eisenman has taught at Bruriah High School and at Bais Yaakov. He taught as a professor at Lander College For Women, a division of Touro College.

Rabbi Eisenman is a popular columnist for Mishpacha, a Jewish magazine, and has authored several books. A prolific speaker, he acts as a scholar-in-residence.

In May 2021, Rabbi Eisenman mistakenly characterized an Orthodox charity campaign as a scam that was connected to an interfaith organization. The error occurred because the name of the Jewish charity, the International Jewish Chesed Foundation (IJCF) pointed to the International Fellowship of Christians and Jews (IFCJ) when entered into a search engine. Eisenman also stated that his suspicion was aroused due to the location of the Jewish charity being in Delaware, apparently not aware of how that state's tax laws were attractive to non-profits. While he later issued an apology letter, he nevertheless abstained from endorsing the charity.

=== Advocacy for sexual abuse victims ===
Soon after taking the pulpit in the late 1990s, Rabbi Eisenman has been outspoken in his support and defense of Orthodox sex abuse victims. A self-proclaimed "anti-establishment" figure, and a "Maverick" to others, he organized a special panel in 2009 to address the issue, receiving pushback from some corners of the community. He has insisted that sexual abuse should be promptly reported to the police. In the wake of sexual assault allegations surrounding Haredi children's author Chaim Walder, Rabbi Eisenman published a strong letter condemning Walder, even encouraging people to throw his books out of the house. Rabbi Eisenman's intention was to stave off any further emotional damage to Walder's victims.

== Personal life ==
Rabbi Eisenman lives with his family in Passaic. His married children live in the New York area and Israel.

== Works ==
- The Elephant in the Room: Torah, Wisdom, & Inspiration for Life (2012)
- For Everything a Time: A Journey Through the Year (2013)
- Shul with a View: A Rabbi's Personal Journal (2018)
