= Aryeh Klapper =

American rabbi

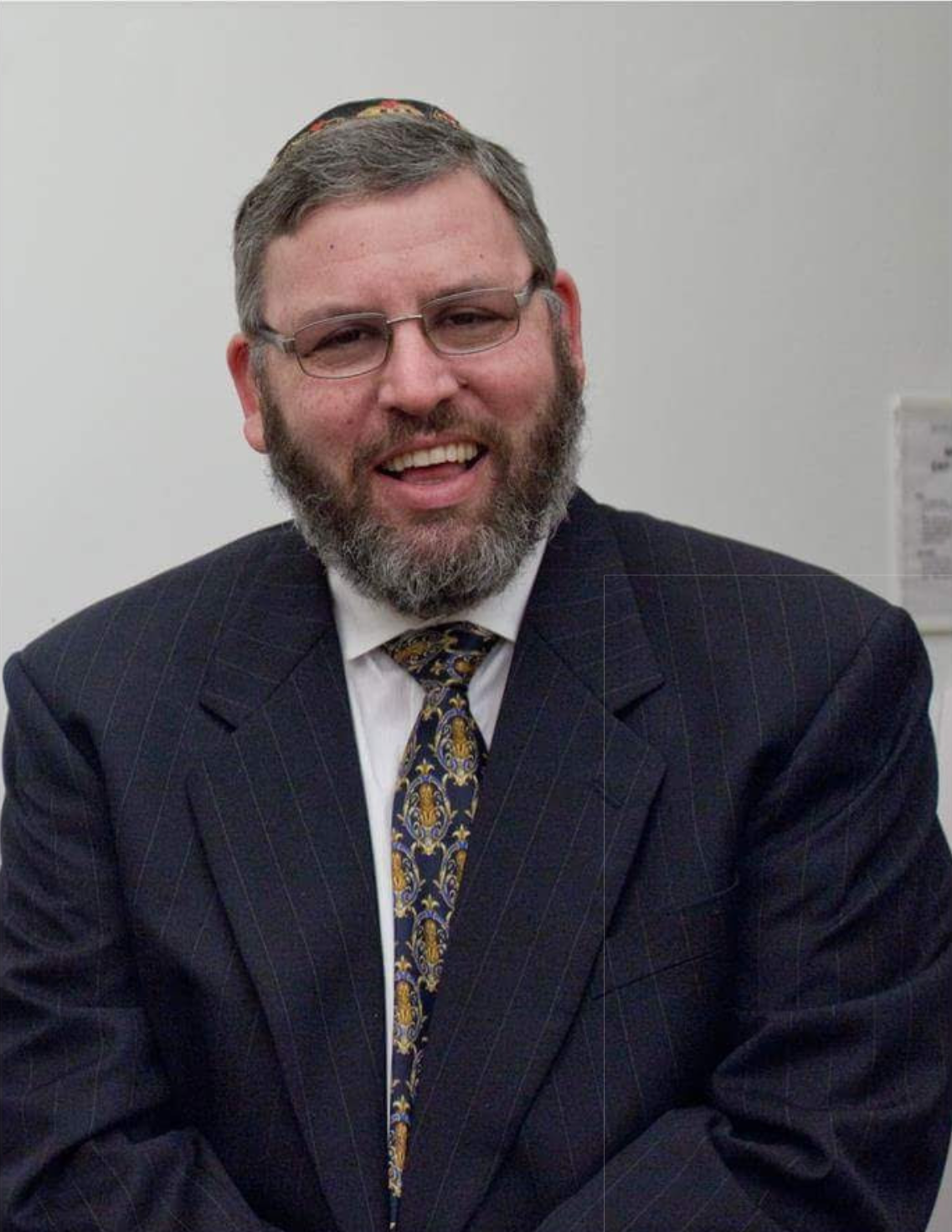

Personal life
- Born: February 3, 1968 (age 58)
- Education: Yeshiva University

Religious life
- Religion: Judaism
- Denomination: Orthodox

Jewish leader
- Position: Dean
- Yeshiva: Center for Modern Torah Leadership
- Residence: Sharon, Massachusetts, U.S.

Aryeh (Robert David) Klapper is a leading American rabbi and Jewish thinker who serves as dean of the Center for Modern Torah Leadership. , co-founder of the Boston Agunah Taskforce, and rosh kollel of the Center for Modern Torah Leadership's student fellowship program, the summer beit midrash. Klapper is known for his lectures, published academic and religious articles, and leadership in the Orthodox world. He was listed as one of Tablet Magazine's "Rabbis You Should Know" in 2014.

Klapper previously served as rabbi of Brandeis Hillel, talmud curriculum chair of Maimonides High School, Orthodox adviser and associate director for Education at Harvard Hillel, instructor of Rabbinics and Medical Ethics at Gann Academy, and interim rabbi of the Young Israel of Sharon.

Klapper launched a podcast, Taking Responsibility for Torah, in 2021. He published a book, Divine Will and Human Experience, in 2022.

== Early life and education ==
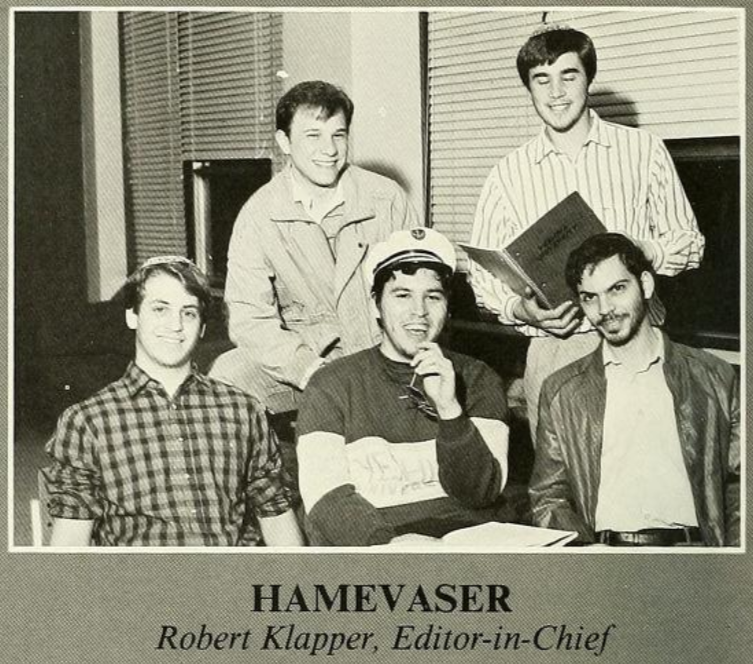
The 1988 staff of Hamevaser. Klapper is in the center with Yona Reiss to his left.

Klapper is the son of Molly Roxana Klapper, author of The German Literary Influence on Byron (1974) and editor of Definitive Creative Impasse-Breaking Techniques In Mediation (2011), and Jacob Klapper, former chair of the electrical and computer engineering department at NJIT and co-author of Phase-Locked and Frequency-Feedback Systems (1972). He has one sister, named Rachele Hannah. Klapper placed second in the 1980 National Spelling Bee after qualifying through the All-Yeshiva Spelldown. The New York Daily News described him as a "spelling star" who had "a vast mental storehouse of words."

Klapper attended Manhattan Day School, graduated from Yeshiva University with a bachelor's degree in political science, and received rabbinic ordination from the Rabbi Isaac Elchanan Theological Seminary and a master's degree in Bible from the Revel Graduate School of Jewish Studies in 1994.

While at YU, Klapper served as editor-in-chief of Hamevaser newspaper, editor-in-chief of Gesher journal, president of the English Honors Society, and co-chair of the Committee to Preserve Revel.

He is married to Deborah Klapper, and has four children and two grandchildren.

== Career ==
Klapper taught at several east-coast universities before joining Harvard Hillel in 2002, where he taught a faculty Talmud class, built the Cambridge eruv, and met his future wife, a Harvard student who served as minyan gabbai. He became known for his intellectual scholarship and his generosity in inviting guests for Shabbat meals. In 1997, he launched his Summer Beit Midrash program, a co-educational summer kollel. He taught at Maimonides High School from 1994 to 2003, eventually serving as Talmud Curriculum Chair, and at Gann Academy from 2005 to 2014. He is a leading Orthodox opponent of torture and sexual abuse.

=== Summer Beit Midrash ===
Klapper first launched the Summer Beit Midrash in 1997 as a six-week all-male kollel geared toward understanding the process of deciding halakha. 15-20 fellows are selected each year to participate. In 2004, after being overwhelmed with applications from women and unable to fund a second program, Klapper made the program co-ed, saying "Psak is largely a function of people asking questions. If someone knows their stuff, others will ask them. We live in a time where I expect women to exercise leadership in the halakhic community." Students study daily, from morning prayers until late at night, and spend the final week writing an amateur responsum in response to that summer's designated question. Each summer's fellows give lectures at synagogues around New England and learn b'chavrusa with community members. In 2009, the program relocated to the Young Israel of Sharon, Massachusetts.

=== Center for Modern Torah Leadership ===
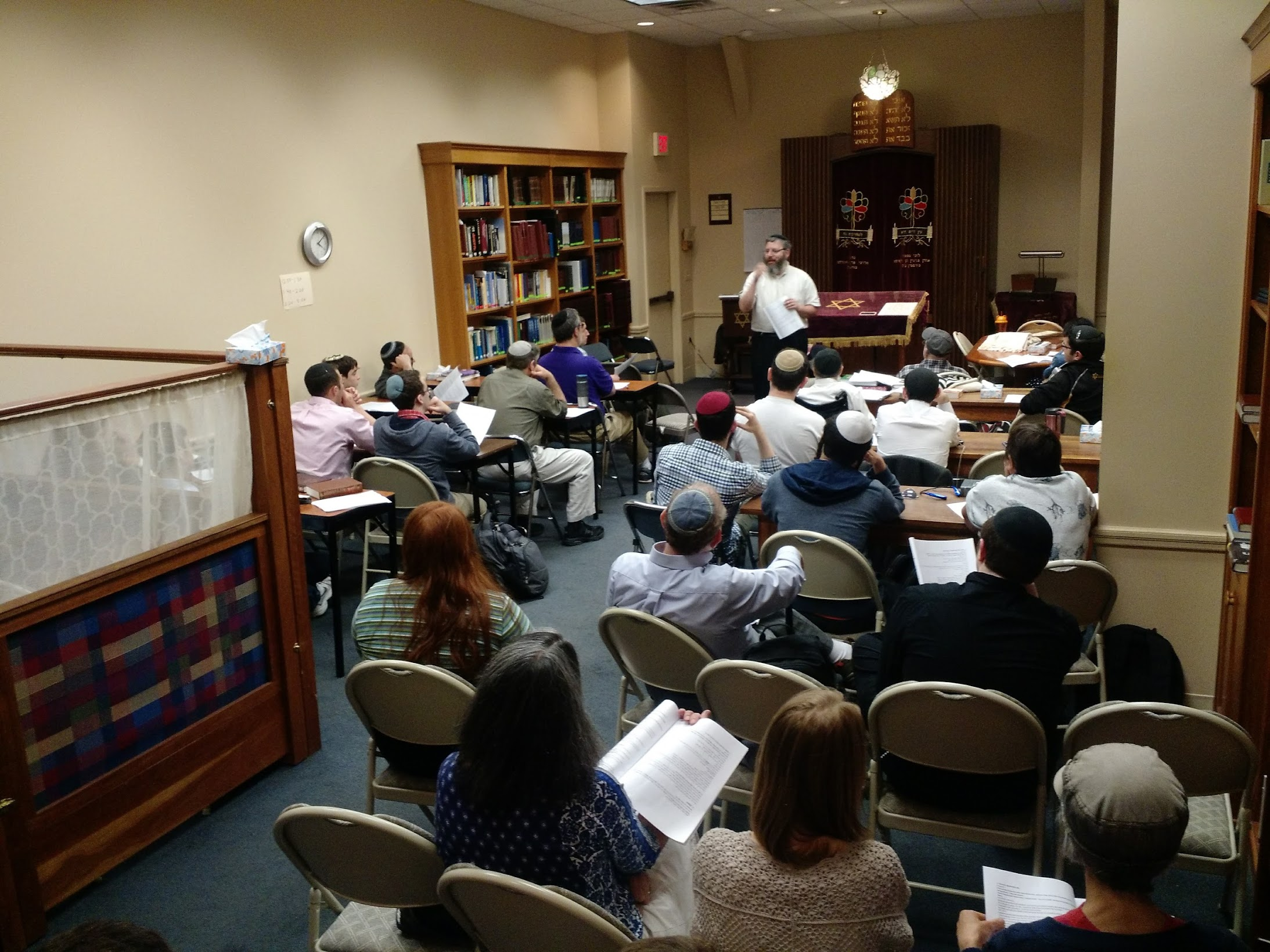
Rabbi Klapper lectures to the 2017 Summer Beit Midrash.

In 2004, Klapper left Harvard Hillel to launch the Center for Modern Torah Leadership, which is a registered non-profit which describes itself as "the intellectual catalyst of Modern Orthodoxy" and aims "to make halakhah the shared spiritual language of the Jewish community, and to make Jewish discourse an essential contributor to the moral conversation of humanity." The center took over the annual Summer Beit Midrash fellowship program and launched the Winter Beit Midrash, a shorter three-day program for students during winter break, and Midreshet Avigayl, a high-level Talmud program for teenage girls. The center also holds national conferences on halakha for select groups of Orthodox rabbis and educators. In 2014, Klapper left Gann Academy to run the Center for Modern Torah Leadership full-time. The center published the first volume of its halakhic journal, Responsibility Inscribed, in 2015.

=== Lectures ===
In his lectures, Klapper "relates Jewish tradition substantively to labor laws, human rights, torture, and many other contemporary public policy issues." He has given "countless shiurim focusing mostly on issues of Jewish law."

==== 2017 Yeshiva University lecture controversy ====
Klapper gives regular student lectures at Yeshiva University.

Invited by the Student Organization of the Yeshiva, Klapper was scheduled to give a lecture there on March 29, 2017. Posters advertising the lecture were placed around the school. On the morning of the 29th, "at least two students witnessed [Rabbi Herschel Schachter, Rosh Yeshiva of Yeshiva University] take down the signs on the left-hand door to the Glueck beit midrash.

He then crumpled the posters into a ball and tossed them into a nearby garbage can." Schachter told the Yeshiva University Commentator that he had taken down the signs because “The guy's an apikores. He shouldn’t be invited here. You can quote me on that if you want. He doesn’t belong here at all.” Dean of RIETS Menachem Penner defended Schachter's actions (though he later said he did not blame Klapper) and other signs were later removed by students. The lecture attracted significant controversy but was attended by 40–50 students. Penner addressed students the following day, saying "putting up signs can also be a provocative act" and blaming the school newspaper for reporting Schachter's comments. He later apologized for impugning the motives of the lecture's student organizers. Yosef Blau, senior Mashgiach Ruchani at YU, said it "isn't clear" why Schachter took exception to Klapper's planned lecture. Schachter later retracted his remarks. In December 2017, Klapper spoke at YU's Revel Graduate School and was scholar-in-residence on YU's Beren Campus. By 2021, the incident was largely forgotten.

=== Selected publications ===
Klapper has published in Tradition, Meorot, Dinei Yisrael, Beit Yitzchak and other journals and has presented at academic and community conferences.

Klapper first gained attention with an article titled "זקן ממרא כגבור המסורת" in Beit Yitzchak vol. 26 (1994). Many rabbis disagreed with the article and disapproved of its publication because it pointed out that "Torah has a sacrifice that is brought for when the greatest sages of the day make a grievous error that causes mass sin" and argued that "[H]alakhah is not intended to enable avoiding responsibility," but it has also attracted widespread support and citation.

Klapper was a primary author behind the 2010 Statement of Principles on the Place of Jews with a Homosexual Orientation in Our Community, which was later signed by more than a hundred rabbis.

Klapper's oft-cited 2012 article The Moral Costs of Jewish Day School "placed the spotlight on communal tuition policies and the moral dilemma that the Jewish community faces from a tuition system that has transformed nearly half of participants from community contributors to charity recipients" and "pointed out some of the deleterious results of such a lifestyle." He "enumerated encouraging young Jews to pursue only those professions that will support the chosen lifestyle among several 'moral' costs of rising day-school tuition."

Klapper was one of eleven theologians behind " "Lo$ing Faith In Our Democracy," a 2014 report published by Auburn Theological Seminary. He argued that "Historically, rabbis presumed that all contributions produce influence" and "believing otherwise would be Jewishly viewed as dangerously naïve."

Klapper's 2017 article "Brain Death and Organ Donation: An Alternative Construction" argued that "we cannot declare people dead so that we can save others."

Klapper's 2021 statement on rape allegations against children's author Chaim Walder, in which he ruled that the books must be removed from shelves, was hailed as part of a "watershed moment" for the Orthodox Jewish world.

=== Beit Din ===
Klapper has sat as a judge on the Boston Beit Din, an Orthodox Jewish court which hears (among other kinds) approximately 40 divorce cases a year, since 2001. He was previously a member of the beit din of Elizabeth, New Jersey. Klapper is a co-founder of Brandeis University's Boston Agunah Taskforce, which aims to prevent and solve agunah cases in the Boston area. He educates family lawyers and judges on Jewish divorce law and advocates for the Jewish prenuptial agreement.

=== Divine Will and Human Experience ===
Klapper published his first book, Divine Will and Human Experience: Explorations of the Halakhic System and Its Values, in 2022. The book is composed of essays on three main themes: the primary foundational commitments of Modern Orthodoxy, selected responsa, and biblical exegesis. In a review for the Jewish Press, David Wolkenfeld wrote that the book "is thought-provoking and has great merit" although the essays "are too short to do justice to the fullness of Rabbi Klapper’s thought".
