= Charles J. Hynes =

American lawyer and politician (1935–2019)

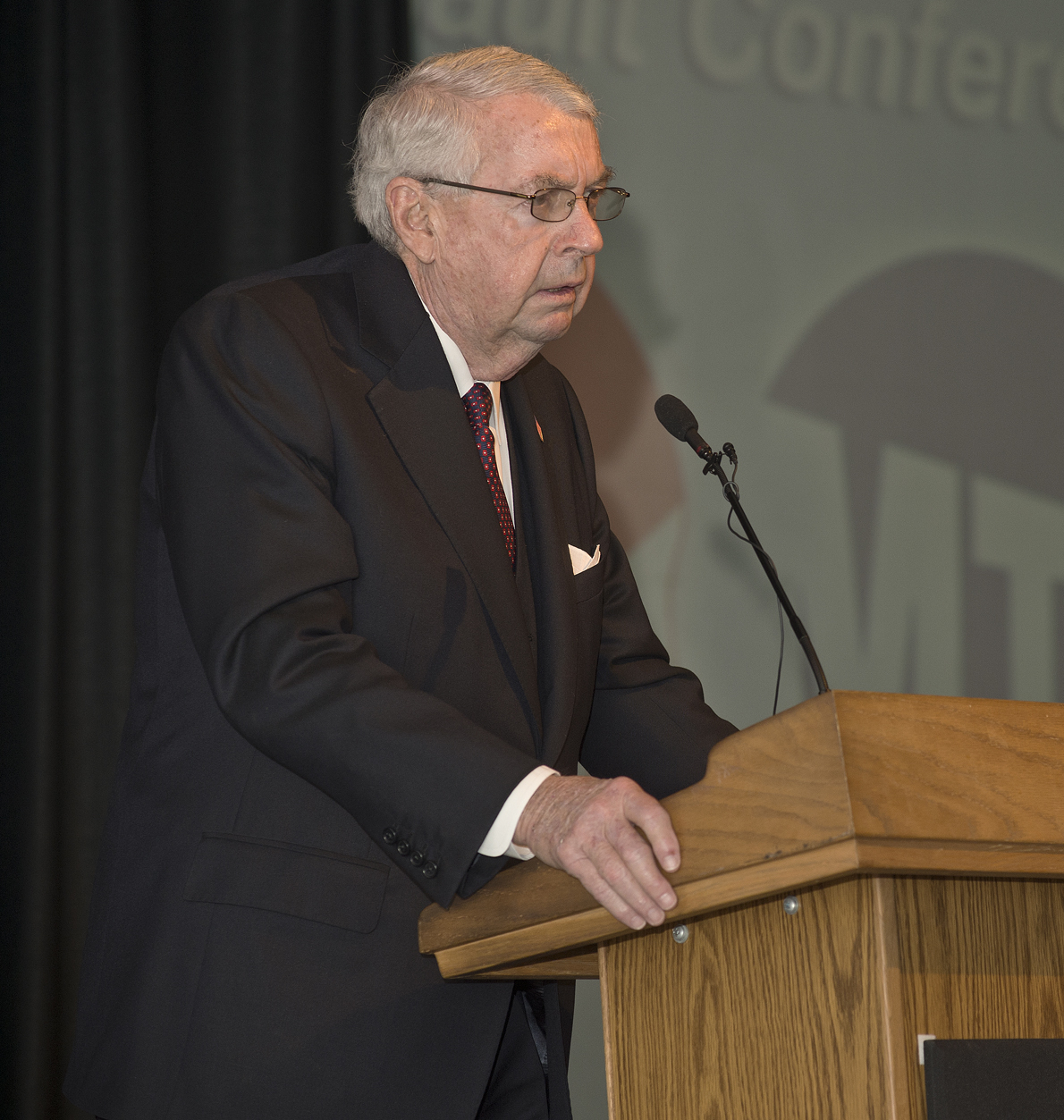
- Hynes in 2012

District Attorney of Kings County
- In office January 1990 – December 2013
- Preceded by: Elizabeth Holtzman
- Succeeded by: Kenneth P. Thompson

24th New York City Fire Commissioner
- In office November 5, 1980 – October 22, 1982
- Mayor: Ed Koch
- Preceded by: Augustus A. Beekman
- Succeeded by: Joseph E. Spinnato

Personal details
- Born: Charles Aiken Hynes; May 28, 1935 New York City, U.S.
- Died: January 29, 2019 (aged 83) Deerfield Beach, Florida, U.S.
- Party: Democratic
- Spouse: Patricia L. Pennisi (m. 1963)
- Children: 5
- Education: St. John's University
- Occupation: Lawyer

Charles Joseph Hynes (born Charles Aiken Hynes; May 28, 1935 – January 29, 2019), also known as Joe Hynes, was an American lawyer and Democratic politician from New York who served as Kings County District Attorney from 1990 to 2013.

== Early life and education ==
Hynes was born and raised, largely by his mother, Regina Katherine Hynes (née Drew), in Flatbush, Brooklyn. He was estranged from his father, Harold Hynes, who was an abusive alcoholic. He was baptized Charles Aiken Hynes, but "since I was not fond of either of my given names, I chose Joe as my confirmation name when I was twelve."

As he was widely known as "Joe", he legally changed his middle name to Joseph upon running for political office. He attended St. Ann's Academy in Queens (now Archbishop Molloy High School) before receiving his undergraduate (1957) and J.D. (1961) degrees from St. John's University in Jamaica, Queens.

== Career before 1989 ==
In 1963, Hynes began working for the Legal Aid Society as an associate attorney. He joined the Kings County District Attorney's Office in 1969, as an Assistant District Attorney. In 1971, Hynes was appointed as Chief of the Rackets Bureau, and was named First Assistant District Attorney in 1973.

In 1975, Governor Hugh Carey and Attorney General Louis Lefkowitz appointed Hynes as special state prosecutor for Nursing Homes, Health and Social Services, in response to a massive scandal in the state's nursing home industry. Hynes' office launched a comprehensive attack on Medicaid fraud, and his Medicaid Fraud Control Unit eventually became a national model, cited in a report of the House Select Committee on Aging as the best in the country. Hynes testified before the United States Congress in 1976, in favor of legislation establishing state fraud control units and providing federal funding. The legislation became law in 1977. Now, 48 states have Medicaid Fraud Control Units.

Hynes was appointed the 24th New York City Fire Commissioner by Mayor Edward I. Koch on November 5, 1980, upon the resignation of Augustus A. Beekman. Hynes served in that position until his resignation on October 22, 1982. He served as a Commissioner for the New York State Commission of Investigation between 1983 and 1985, by appointment of New York State Assembly Speaker Stanley Fink. In 1985, Governor Mario Cuomo appointed District Attorney Hynes as Special State Prosecutor for the New York City Criminal Justice System.

In 1987 Hynes investigated the death of Michael Griffith, an African-American man. Hynes secured three homicide convictions against the defendants and published a book about the case.

== District Attorney ==
=== Accomplishments ===
In October 1990, Hynes initiated the Drug Treatment Alternative-to-Prison Program (DTAP) on the premise that drug-addicted defendants would return to society in a better position to resist drugs and crime after treatment than if they had spent a comparable time in prison at nearly twice the cost. DTAP is available for nonviolent predicate felons with a history of drug addiction and has been held up as a model for similar prosecution based drug treatment programs across the country.

In 1999 Hynes created "the ComALERT (Community And Law Enforcement Resources Together) public safety program which supports individuals on probation or parole as they re-enter their Brooklyn communities. The program was validated by a Harvard University study which found it reduced recidivism by more than half."

Hynes is credited with having established one of the most comprehensive-and first-countywide programs designed specifically to address domestic abuse as a criminal issue, and with the collaboration of former Mayor Rudolph W. Giuliani implemented a citywide program to monitor convicted domestic violence offenders.

=== Election campaigns and challengers ===
In 1998 he sought the Democratic nomination for Governor of New York but was defeated in the primary by Peter Vallone Sr.

In 2005, Hynes narrowly beat a primary challenge from State Senator John L. Sampson who won 37 percent of the vote to Hynes' 41 percent. Mark G. Peters, a former senior official in the state attorney general's office, got 15 percent of the votes and Arnold Kriss, a former assistant district attorney in Brooklyn and a former deputy police commissioner, received 7 percent. The race had attracted considerable attention because Mr. Hynes, a fixture in Brooklyn politics, was seen as vulnerable after four terms in office.

In 2009, Hynes was unopposed.

The New York Times reported that the three-way Democratic primary race in 2013 posed a threat to Mr. Hynes. In the Democratic primary in 2005, when Mr. Hynes had four opponents, he won with 41 percent of the vote, 4 percent more than John L. Sampson, a state senator from Brooklyn. In the previous primary, an obscure candidate, Sandra E. Roper, mounted an unexpectedly strong challenge against Mr. Hynes. The Times writes that while Mr. Hynes has been in office more than 20 years, he has recently come under fire for failing to investigate sexual abuse claims in ultra-Orthodox Jewish communities and for his office's mishandling of cases that sent innocent people to prison.

In the 2013 Democratic primary, and then again in the general election on the Republican and Conservative lines, Hynes lost to Kenneth P. Thompson.

=== Controversies ===
==== Prosecution of politicians, elected judges and political opponents ====
In 1997, Hynes successfully prosecuted lawyer John O'Hara for voting in the wrong election district. As a result, O'Hara, who admits that he had voted in his girlfriend's district, was disbarred, paid a $20,000 fine, and served 1,500 hours of community service. He is the only person besides suffragette Susan B. Anthony to be convicted in New York for voting in the wrong district. O'Hara has claimed he was prosecuted because he had run for office against Hynes' allies and had supported challengers against Hynes. In 2009, the state Supreme Court's Appellate Division unanimously approved a report by a state judicial committee that found that O'Hara's prosecution was unjustified; the report said, "Mr. O'Hara, accurately it appears, claims that [Hynes' political] machine went gunning for him and pounced on his change of residency calling it election fraud." O'Hara was reinstated to the bar, although his conviction was upheld.

In 2001, civil court judge John L. Phillips Jr. announced his intent to oppose Hynes in that year's race for district attorney. Shortly afterward, Hynes' office began an investigation that resulted in claims that Phillips was the victim of a real estate scheme, and that the 70-year-old judge was incompetent to handle his own affairs. Hynes' former chief of staff was named as temporary guardian of Phillips' real estate holdings.

In 2003, Hynes' office filed felony theft charges against Sandra Roper, a lawyer who had challenged Hynes in the 2001 primary race. Prosecutors said that Roper had stolen about $9,000 from a client, whom she allegedly told she was representing for free. Ms. Roper's defense argued that the funds were legal fees that the client had agreed to. Hynes recused himself from the case. Following a 2004 mistrial due to a hung jury, the charges were dismissed in 2005 after Roper repaid the funds to the client. Roper subsequently sued Hynes, alleging that he had acted improperly; the lawsuit was thrown out in 2006, as the court found that Roper had not proven that Hynes was personally involved in her prosecution.

Between 2003 and 2007, Hynes prosecuted former assemblyman and Kings County Democratic Party chief Clarence Norman Jr., four times on four separate political corruption indictments. Norman was acquitted once and convicted three times on felony charges, including grand larceny and extortion. Hynes has also successfully prosecuted two former Brooklyn Supreme Court Justices, Victor Barron and Gerald Garson, for taking bribes.

==== Kidnapping and sex abuse cases in ultra-Orthodox communities ====
In 1998, after being kidnapped, blindfolded, bloodied, and stun-gunned by hooded assailants of the New York divorce coercion gang over the issuance of a get (religious divorce document), Abraham Rubin took his case to the New York City Police Department, but it was dropped by Hynes' office because the victim could not identify any of his assailants.> Newsday interviewed an additional dozen residents in the neighborhoods of Borough Park and Midwood, Brooklyn, all of whom claimed that they were harassed, threatened, or assaulted by men working for their estranged wives. Hynes agreed to look into the charges but, despite pressure from the victims, declined to prosecute. The gang remained in operation until they were apprehended in a sting operation and convicted in the United States District Court for the District of New Jersey.

Hynes was also criticized for alleged reluctance in prosecuting cases of sexual abuse against children in ultra-Orthodox communities, which make up a significant segment of Brooklyn. A 2008 editorial in The Jewish Week accused Hynes of treating such cases "with a stance ranging from passive to weak-willed." The editorial focused in particular on the case of Rabbi Yehuda Kolko, a Brooklyn yeshiva teacher charged with sexually molesting several students. In a plea bargain, Hynes allowed Kolko to plead guilty only to two misdemeanor counts of child endangerment; he was sentenced to three years' probation.

Following the Kolko case, Hynes' office started a program in 2009 called Kol Tzedek (Hebrew for Voice of Justice) to focus on and provide support for ultra-Orthodox sexual abuse victims. Hynes said in 2012 that the program had led to 95 arrests involving more than 120 victims. The New York Times wrote that their own investigation found that the program had little to do with many of the 95 arrests cited by Hynes. His office declined to publicize the names of defendants arrested or convicted in these cases, a policy Hynes attributed to concern that in the "very tight-knit and insular" ultra-Orthodox community, disclosure of defendants' names would place the victims at risk. Victims' rights groups alleged that this and other decisions represent Hynes bowing to pressure from ultra-Orthodox leaders.

In January 2013, shortly before the sentencing of Satmar Hasidic counselor Nechemya Weberman for repeatedly abusing a young girl, Hynes published an editorial in the Daily News in which he wrote, "I hope the verdict and sentence sends a very clear and unmistakable message to people in certain parts of the Orthodox community — it is time to start protecting victims rather than defendants." Weberman was sentenced to 103 years in prison. Two weeks later, Jewish religious school principal Emanuel Yegutkin was sentenced to 55 years for abusing three boys. Hynes touted both convictions as victories for his office.

==== Allegations of misconduct ====
In 2010, Hynes' office vacated the murder conviction of Jabbar Collins, who had been convicted in 1995 of killing a Brooklyn rabbi. Collins had been sentenced to 34 years to life in prison, but won the right to retrial after the district attorney's office admitted that a key witness had recanted his testimony in the presence of a prosecutor before trial, and that this information had not been disclosed to the defense. Collins was released after another of the original witnesses against him, Angel Santos, testified that the case's original prosecutor, Assistant District Attorney Michael Vecchione, had coerced Santos to testify against Collins with threats of physical violence and imprisonment. Following Collins' release, Hynes said Vecchione was a "very principled lawyer" and "not guilty of any misconduct", and said he had no plans to investigate anyone who had been involved in Collins' prosecution.

The following year, Collins filed a $150 million lawsuit against Vecchione and several other prosecutors in Hynes' office, although Hynes himself was not named as a defendant. In a hearing for the lawsuit, Judge Frederic Block said Vecchione's behavior in Collins' trial had been "horrendous" and asked the lawyer for the city, "Hynes hasn't treated it seriously, has he?" In February 2013, Block denied the city's motion to dismiss the suit, but said that while Collins could move forward in the suit against New York City, Vecchione and the other individual prosecutors named were immune to prosecution.

Hynes' office was also criticized for its conduct in prosecuting William Lopez, who spent 23 years in prison for murder before his release by a federal judge in 2013; and Ronald Bozeman, who was released in 2012 after serving a year in prison on an indictment for armed robbery.

Following a January 2013 cover article in the Village Voice titled "Brooklyn Deserves a New D.A.", Hynes sent the Voice a lengthy rebuttal which called their story "highly biased journalism" and "totally one-sided." He also responded to specific details in their reporting on the cases of Collins and Bozeman, as well as other matters discussed in the article.

==== CBS TV reality series ====
In May 2013, a lawsuit was filed by Abe George, a candidate opposing Hynes in the 2013 primary race, to block CBS from airing a reality show, titled Brooklyn D.A., featuring Hynes' staff of prosecutors fighting to win cases. George claimed that Hynes and CBS were "illegally utilizing, diverting and distributing the public resources of his office and position as Brooklyn District Attorney for the purposes of furthering [Hynes'] personal political campaign." CBS, which described the program as a "six-part news series", said George's lawsuit was "obviously a publicity push by a politician." A Manhattan judge dismissed George's request, and the series premiered on May 28, 2013.

=== Electoral defeat ===
Hynes was defeated in his 2013 bid for reelection by Kenneth Thompson.

== Personal life ==
In 1963, Hynes married Patricia L. Pennisi, a registered nurse. The couple had five children. Hynes kept a summer home in Breezy Point, New York.

On January 29, 2019, Hynes died at a hospital in Deerfield Beach, Florida, where he was vacationing.

Fire appointments
Preceded by Augustus A. Beekman	New York City Fire Commissioner; 1980–1982	Succeeded by Joseph E. Spinnato
Legal offices
Preceded by Elizabeth Holtzman	District Attorney of Kings County, New York; 1990–2013	Succeeded by Kenneth P. Thompson
