= John O'Hara (Brooklyn politician) =

American lawyer

John Kennedy O'Hara (born c. 1961) is an American lawyer, active in Brooklyn, New York politics. He is also the first person convicted of illegal voting in New York State since Susan B. Anthony was convicted for voting (before women had the right to vote) in 1872. His conviction was overturned on Thursday, January 12, 2017. On February 23, 2017, O'Hara filed a malicious prosecution lawsuit for $25 million against disgraced ex-Brooklyn D. A. Charles "Joe" Hynes.

The son of working-class Irish Americans and the first in his family to go to college, O'Hara's interest in politics was clear even in childhood: at the age of seven he wrote to his congressman complaining that he didn't have the right to vote but was still required to pay sales tax on toys. At the age of 11 he worked on George McGovern's campaign in the 1972 presidential election. At 16, his investigative reporting for his school newspaper resulted in the school principal being fired for lacking the appropriate license for his job.

As a teenager and young man, he was involved with Brooklyn's Reform Democrats against the Meade Esposito machine. In the 1990s, he ran for office six times in primary election never winning but coming within a few hundred votes in a 1992 election for New York State Assembly.

In 1996, O'Hara was charged with running for office and voting from a false address. In fact, O'Hara had voted from his girlfriend's apartment, in which approximately half of his time was spent. He was convicted because their former landlord falsely testified that the apartment was uninhabitable. The discovery of O'Hara's voting habits was used by incumbent Brooklyn District Attorney Charles "Joe" Hynes to prosecute O'Hara for voting in a place other than his "principle and permanent residence". Refusing any plea deal, after a mistrial and a reversal on appeal, O'Hara was convicted of a felony in July 1999, sentenced to five years probation, a $20,000 fine and 1,500 hours of community service cleaning a park. The case also resulted in his disbarment on November 10, 1997.

He continued to appeal his case, and continued campaigning on behalf of other anti-machine candidates, especially for judgeships. O'Hara-backed Peter Sweeney and Eileen Nadelson won judgeships in 2001 and several other insurgent candidates have won Brooklyn judgeships since then. An attempt was made to prosecute Nadelson for election fraud for false petitions; these turned out to be false petitions by "a person or persons unknown to [her] campaign." Civil rights lawyer Sandra Roper, backed by O'Hara in a failed 2001 candidacy against District Attorney Hynes, was prosecuted for what Christopher Ketcham says "most observers agree is an unfounded charge of grand larceny". Roper's trial ended in a mistrial on November 8, 2004. A Brooklyn judge dismissed the charges February 28, 2005.

On October 29, 2008, O'Hara's petition for re-admission to the bar was submitted by the Supreme Court of the State of New York Appellate Division: Second Judicial Department to the Committee on Character And Fitness. The Full Committee on Character And Fitness for the Second, Tenth, Eleventh and Thirteenth districts, voted unanimously on June 29, 2009, to approve the subcommittee's recommendation that O'Hara's application for reinstatement be granted. On October 6, 2009, O'Hara was reinstated as an attorney by the Supreme Court of the State of New York Appellate Division: Second Judicial Department. However, his conviction still stood.

In recommending O'Hara's reinstatement, the subcommittee of the Committee on Character And Fitness wrote, "Mr. O'Hara, accurately it appears, claims that the machine went gunning for him and pounced on his change of residency calling it election fraud. … Although the committee has grave doubts that Mr. O'Hara did anything that justified his criminal prosecution, even if Mr. O'Hara was guilty of the offense of which he was convicted, we believe Mr. O'Hara now has the requisite character and fitness to be reinstated as a member of the bar." In December 2009, the New York Daily News urged a gubernatorial pardon to clear O'Hara's name, saying "It is beyond doubt that O'Hara was the victim of a criminal justice vendetta ginned up by enemies in the Brooklyn Democratic Party… At heart, the case was an example of selective and overzealous prosecution."
