= Crystal Z Campbell =

American filmmaker and artist (born 1980)

- Born: 1980 (age 45–46); Prince George's County, Maryland, U.S.
- Education: University of Oklahoma (BFA); University at Albany, SUNY (MA); University of California, San Diego (MFA)
- Style: Experimental film
- Awards: Guggenheim Fellow (2021)

Crystal Z Campbell (born 1980) is an American filmmaker and artist. A 2021 Guggenheim Fellow, they (Note: Campbell uses they pronouns, which this article accordingly uses for consistency.) have created work with themes such as the "underloved" and in "public secrets", and in 2022 won the 58th Chicago International Film Festival Silver Hugo for Documentary Short Film for their film Revolver.

== Early life and education ==
Crystal Z Campbell was born in 1980 in Prince George's County, Maryland. Their father is an African-American of Creek Freedmen descent who was part of the military, where he met Campbell's mother, a Manila native of Chinese and Filipino descent; both of her parents later worked as United States Postal Service employees. They were raised in Oklahoma.

They received a BFA degree in studio art from the University of Oklahoma, a MA degree in Africana Studies from the University at Albany, SUNY, and a MFA degree in visual arts from the University of California, San Diego. They attended the Skowhegan School of Painting and Sculpture (2003), and the Whitney Independent Study Program (2010).

== Career ==
They created a microscopic abstract portrait memorializing Henrietta Lacks during their 2012 residency at the Rijksakademie van beeldende kunsten.

While visiting the soon-to-be-demolished Slave Theater, Campbell recovered a damaged 35mm film and, after rescuing it from a house fire, spent some time - including as a 2017 MacDowell Fellow - redeveloping it as Go-Rilla Means War narrating the 19-minute raw footage with inspiration from the theater's owner John L. Phillips Jr. and presenting it at the BRIC House and Visual Studies Workshop in 2018. Sonia Fernández Pan called it Campbell's "most serendipitous project".

Campbell received a 2018 Pollock-Krasner Foundation grant and 2022 Creative Capital grant, and they were a 2020 Radcliffe-Film Study Center Fellow and 2024 New York Film Academy/New York State Council on the Arts Fellow in Film/Video. In 2021, they were awarded a Guggenheim Fellowship in Fine Arts.

Campbell was a 2015-2020 Tulsa Artist Fellow, during which they did research for the Tulsa race massacre to draw inspiration for art. In 2021, they exhibited two such works, namely the video art exhibition Flight and the painting-photography mixed-media installation Notes from Black Wall Street: Upon a Century. That same year, they also exhibited the installation "Hi, Hi, Hi, Highway", which explores the environmental racism surrounding the local Interstate 244. In 2024, they spoke about their experiences of censorship of such work.

In 2022, Campbell won the 58th Chicago International Film Festival Silver Hugo for Documentary Short Film for their film Revolver, which was inspired by the founding Exodusters of Nicodemus, Kansas, and they appeared at the Robert Flaherty Film Seminar. Other films they created include Ode to the Underloved (2023), where they "revisited people, places, and events deserving of further attention", and Makahiya (2024), inspired by their Filipino heritage. In 2025, the Saint Louis Art Museum held their first solo museum exhibition, Currents 124.

Campbell specializes in the "underloved" and in "public secrets". Fernández Pan said that "form, a container of ideas and intentions for Campbell, is never quite fixed within the immersive environments they create". Brandy McDonnell of The Oklahoman said that their work "frequently incorporates film, sound, live performance, painting and writing".

Campbell had previously lived in the Netherlands and in Greenwood District, Tulsa, before being based in Oklahoma City. They also serve as a visiting associate professor in art and media study at the University at Buffalo.
