= Mesirah =

Jewish law concept

Mesirah (or mesira, lit. 'to hand over') is the action in which one Jew reports the conduct of another Jew to a non-rabbinic authority in a manner and under the circumstances forbidden by rabbinic law. In any case, "excessive" punishment by non-Jews may be permissible if a precept of the Torah has been violated.

The term for an individual who commits mesirah is moser (Hebrew: מוסר) or mossur. A person who repeatedly violates this law by informing on his fellow Jews is considered subject to din moser (lit. 'law of the informer'), which is analogous to din rodef in that both prescribe death for the offender, at least in theory. According to some, in some circumstances the offender may be killed without warning.

== Origin ==
The source of the ban comes from the Bava Kamma (Hebrew: בבא קמא) section of the Babylonian Talmud. The law was most likely instigated to ease Jewish life under Roman or Persian rule. This law is discussed in Babylonian Talmud, Maimonides, and in Shulchan Aruch. Shulchan Aruch, however, states that Jews should testify against each other in the gentile court in cases where it is obvious that they would be covering up for each other.

Maimonides states:

Whoever adjudicates in a non-Jewish court ... is wicked and it is as though he has reviled, blasphemed and rebelled against the law of Moses.

Maimonides further explains: "It is forbidden to hand over a Jew to the heathen, neither his person nor his goods, even if he is wicked and a sinner, even if he causes distress and pain to fellow-Jews. Whoever hands over a Jew to the heathen has no part in the next world. It is permitted to kill a moser wherever he is. It is even permitted to kill him before he has handed over (a fellow Jew)."

== Current status ==
According to Michael Broyde, there are many different opinions among 20th-century rabbis as to the extent and circumstances mesirah is still valid in modern times. Chaim Kanievsky, a leading Israeli rabbi and posek in Haredi society ruled that reporting instances of sexual child abuse to the police is consistent with Jewish law. Hershel Schachter concurred, stating that abuse cases should be reported in full to the civil authorities.

According to The Times of Israel and a Channel 4 investigation, the concept of mesirah was used by a Haredi Jewish leader to protect community members investigated for child molestation from police investigation.

=== Australia ===
The mesirah doctrine came under intense public scrutiny in Australia in early 2015 as a result of evidence given to the Royal Commission into Institutional Responses to Child Sexual Abuse relating to an alleged long-running and systematic cover-up of child sexual abuse and the institutional protection of perpetrators at the exclusive Melbourne boys' school Yeshiva College. On 28 January 2015 Fairfax Media reported secret tape recordings and emails had been disclosed, which revealed that members of Australia's Orthodox Jewish community who assisted police investigations into alleged child sexual abuse were pressured to remain silent on the matter. Criminal barrister Alex Lewenberg was alleged to have been "disappointed", and to have berated a Jew who had been a victim of a Jewish sex offender and whom he subsequently regarded as a mossur for breaking with mesirah tradition. Lewenberg was subsequently found guilty of professional misconduct.

In February 2015, Zephaniah Waks, an adherent of the ultra-Orthodox Hasidic Chabad sect in Melbourne, Australia, testified in front of the Royal Commission. He stated that following his discovery that one of his sons had been sexually abused by David Kramer, a teacher at their school, Yeshiva College, he confronted the school's principal, Abraham Glick and demanded that Kramer be sacked. Waks told of his shock when he learned a few days later that Kramer was still working at the school. He again confronted Glick, who then claimed that Kramer had admitted his guilt "because he wanted to be caught", but that the school could not dismiss him because, as Glick claimed, Kramer was at risk of self-harm. Waks also told the Commission that despite his anger, he felt constrained from going to the authorities:

I thought this was absolutely outrageous, however if I reported this to the police I would be in breach of the Jewish principle of mesirah.

He added that the concept of mesirah prevented Chabad members from going to secular authorities:

At the very least, the breach of mesirah almost certainly always leads to shunning and intimidation within the Jewish community and would almost certainly damage marriage prospects of your children.

Giving evidence to the Commission on the day before his father, Menachem (Manny) Waks, one of three children from the Waks family who were sexually abused by staff at Yeshiva College, testified that after breaking mesirah by going public about his abuse, he and his family had been ostracised by rabbinical leaders, shunned by his community and subjected to a sustained campaign of abuse, intimidation and threats, which eventually forced Waks to leave Australia with his wife and children. He also testified about how members of the Chabad community had pressured him to abandon his advocacy:

I was in fact contacted by several considered community members, and they said to me that the anti-Semites are having a field day with my testimony and my publicity around this issue, and that if I cared about the community, I'd cease doing that straight away.

Counsel Assisting the commission then asked Waks how he felt having been accused of being an informer:

I am appalled by it obviously, because the concept of 'Mesirah' really, you can become a death target. Taken at its literal meaning, you become potentially a target who is legitimate to be murdered, because you've gone and cooperated with the authorities. Now, I've never felt threatened for my life, but it does highlight the severity in which this concept is held.

In December 2017, the Commission's final report included a recommendation to Jewish institutions:

All Jewish institutions in Australia should ensure that their complaint handling policies explicitly state that the halachic concepts of mesirah, moser and lashon hara do not apply to the communication and reporting of allegations of child sexual abuse to police and other civil authorities.

=== Israel ===
Rabbinic courts in Israel have issued writs calling for social exclusion of Jews bringing legal issues to Israel's civil courts.

=== United States ===
Mesirah has been cited as one of the main reasons for the gross underreporting of sexual abuse cases in Brooklyn's Haredi community. It has been used to dissuade Jewish auditors from reporting other Jews to the Internal Revenue Service for tax fraud.

== See also ==
- Omertà A similar practice that has been used by mafias.
