= Hershel Schachter =

American Orthodox rabbi

Rabbi Hershel Schachter
- צבי שׁכטר
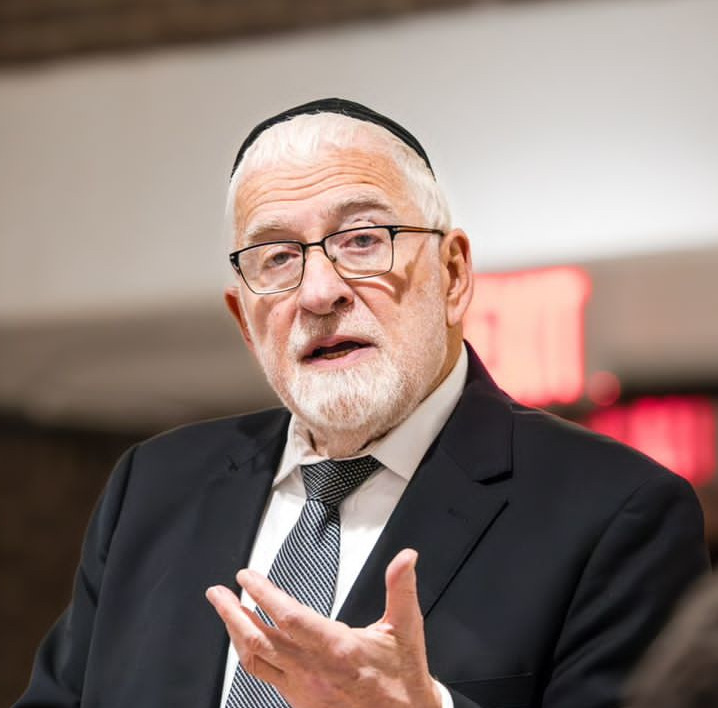
- Schachter in 2023

Personal life
- Born: July 28, 1941 (age 85) Scranton, Pennsylvania, U.S
- Spouse: Shoshana Schachter
- Parent: Melech Schachter (father)
- Education: Yeshiva University

Religious life
- Religion: Judaism
- Denomination: Modern Orthodox Judaism

Jewish leader
- Yeshiva: RIETS
- Organization: Orthodox Union
- Began: 1967
- Residence: Washington Heights, Manhattan

Hershel Schachter (born July 28, 1941) is an American Orthodox rabbi, posek, and rosh yeshiva (Note: The title of rosh yeshiva is simultaneously held by many rabbis at RIETS. It refers to a permanent lectureship.) at the Rabbi Isaac Elchanan Theological Seminary (RIETS), part of Yeshiva University in New York City.

Schachter is a halakhic advisor to the Orthodox Union and has rendered notable decisions in a number of contemporary topic areas.

== Early life and education ==
Hershel Schachter was born in Scranton, Pennsylvania to Melech Schachter, a rosh yeshiva at Yeshiva University.

Schachter graduated from Yeshiva University High School for Boys in 1958. He became an assistant to Joseph Ber Soloveitchik at the age of 22. He earned a B.A. from Yeshiva College and an M.A. in Hebrew literature from the Bernard Revel Graduate School of Jewish Studies in 1967. After receiving rabbinic ordination that year at the age of 26, Schachter became the youngest rosh yeshiva at RIETS, and he was appointed rosh kollel (dean of the kollel) when the position became available following the aliyah of the previous rosh kollel, Aharon Lichtenstein, in 1971.

Schachter is a prominent posek. He is also a halakhic advisor to the kashrut division of the Orthodox Union.

== Halakhic opinions ==
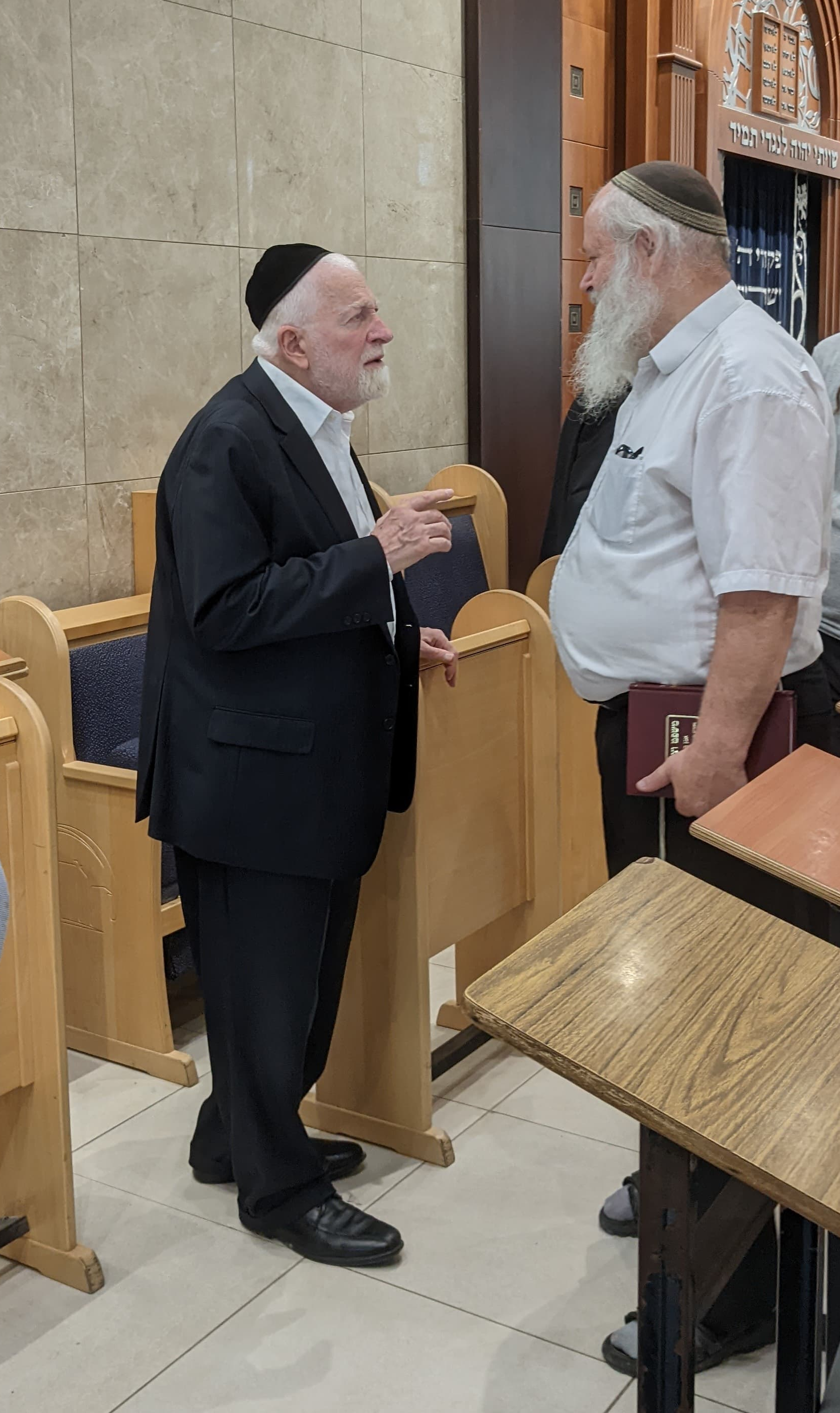
Schachter with Yoel Katan, chief editor of the Shlomo Aumann Institute

Schachter is considered to be amongst the foremost poskim in today's Jewish Modern Orthodox community. Schachter served a pivotal role during the COVID-19 pandemic, publishing responsa that guided and advised Jews in their observance of halakha during an unprecedented time. His responsa are noted for being "broad and well-sourced" in addressing various issues that Jews were facing at the time, primarily due to quarantine and other preventative measures. He endorsed proper precautions and measures to protect people and those around them from catching the disease, while advising Jews how to adjust their lives to these precautions. Additionally, he maintained "sensitivity" for the broader role Jews serve in society and had a care for the "good of the whole."

Schachter came under fire in mid-2025 for his support of convicted pedophile Nechemya Weberman, after Schachter's name appeared among signatories requesting Weberman's clemency and early release. In November 2025, Schachter publicly withdrew his support from the clemency petition after learning more about the case and issued a video statement saying he had not been fully informed of the details when he signed the letter, and declared “I retract my signature,” asserting that Weberman “should remain incarcerated". Schachter expressed that he was concerned that Weberman's sentence was longer than that of convicted pedophiles from other religious and ethnic groups.

In the realm of medical halakha, Schachter does not allow Jewish doctors or medical students to work on Shabbat unless a person's life might be at risk. Jewish doctors and medical students should observe Shabbat, but that is trumped by the need to save a life. Schachter believes that the living status of a brain dead individual is a safek (matter of doubt), and thus requires that all decisions be made with the same stringencies applied to all cases where life-and-death is in doubt. This, therefore, forbids the organ donations of brain dead individuals, by considering them as possibly still halakhically alive, but also requires halitzah (release from the obligation of levirate marriage) in the case that a childless widow is left with only a brain dead husband as well as an able brother-in-law.

In monetary law and taxation, Schachter believes that a graduated system of income taxes is "fair and reasonable" as they provide various necessary services to "take care of" fellow citizens. Thus, it qualifies as dina d'malkhuta dina (law of the land is law), and everyone is halakhically obligated to pay taxes.

Schachter holds that a woman is not allowed to serve as the president of a synagogue unless there is absolutely no other choice.

He is very supportive of using tekhelet on tzitzit and has developed his own method of tying which is widely used.

== Other views ==
In a December 2006 speech, Schachter stated that mesirah (informing on a fellow Jew to the authorities) "is permitted in situations where one is a public menace...or if one is physically or psychologically harming another individual (for example, in instances of sexual abuse of children, students, campers etc., or spousal abuse)." In a February 2013 speech to a London audience, Schachter echoed this sentiment. He did express concern that before going to the authorities, one should make sure that a potential abuse victim is credible by referring him to a competent rabbi or psychologist. Schachter cited concerns that if the child's story was a fabrication, it could result in a Jew being wrongly incarcerated.

Schachter has been condemned for his use of the term shvartze (the Yiddish word for black, racially loaded when directed at a person. "The recent use of a derogatory racial term and negative characterizations of African-Americans and Muslims, by a member of the faculty, are inappropriate, offensive, and do not represent the values and mission of Yeshiva University", a YU spokesman stated.

Schachter has been endorsed by the Organization for the Resolution of Agunot, a non-profit organization that advocates for the elimination of abuse from the Jewish divorce process by, among other things, organizing public protests to compel husbands to grant their wives gittin (religious divorce documents). Schacter does not endorse a sex-strike as a valid way to compel a husband to grant a get. In 2024, the activist Adina Sash staged a 6-month sex-strike which led Schacter to call her behavior "destructive".

== Works ==
=== Books ===
- Schachter, Hershel (1992). Eretz HaTzvi: Biurei Sugyot ארץ הצבי: ביאורי סוגיות [Land of the Deer: Explanations of Issues] (in Hebrew). New York: The Michael Scharf Publication Trust of Yeshiva University Press. p. 291. ISBN 9780881254105.
- Schachter, Hershel (1994). Nefesh HaRav – Likutei Amarim, Teurei Ma'asim VeDivrei Ha'arakha LeMal'ot Shanah LiFtirat HaRav Yosef Dov HaLevi Soloveitchik נפש הרב – לקוטי אמרים, תיאורי מעשים ודברי הערכה למלאות שנה לפטירת הרב יוסף דוב הלוי סולוביצ'יק [Spirit of The Rav – A Collection of Sayings, Descriptions of Deeds, and Words of Appreciation For the Anniversary of the Death of Rabbi Joseph Ber HaLevi Soloveitchik] (in Hebrew). Jerusalem: Reshit Yerushalayim.
- Schachter, Hershel (1997). B'ikvei HaTzon: Birurei Halakha בעקבי הצאן: בירורי הלכה [In the Footsteps of the Flock: Clarifications on Jewish Law] (in Hebrew). Jerusalem: Flatbush School. p. 293.
- Schachter, Hershel (2001). MiP'ninei HaRav – Maran HaRav Yosef Dov HaLevi Soloveitchik zt'l: Likutei Amarim, Teurei Ma'asim VeDivrei Ha'arakha מפניני הרב – מרן הרב יוסף דוב הלוי סולוביצ'יק, זצ"ל: לקוטי אמרים, תיאורי מעשים ודברי הערכה [From the Aphorisms of The Rav – Rabbi Joseph Ber HaLevi Soloveitchik zt'l: A Collection of Sayings, Descriptions of Deeds, and Words of Appreciation] (in Hebrew). Flatbush School. p. 339.
- Soloveitchik, Joseph B. (2002). Schachter, Hershel (ed.). Shiurei HaRav HaGaon Rabi Yosef Dov HaLevi Soloveitchik zt'l Al Inyanei Tzitzit, Inyanei Tefillin VeHilkhot Kriat HaTorah – MiPi HaShmuah שיעורי הרב הגאון רבי יוסף דב הלוי סולוביצ'יק זצ"ל על עניני ציצית, עניני תפילין והלכות קריאת התורה – מפי השמועה [Lessons of HaGaon Rabbi Joseph Ber HaLevi Soloveitchik zt'l on Matters of Tzizit, Tefillin and the Torah Reading Laws – From Hearsay] (PDF) (in Hebrew). p. 207.
- Soloveitchik, Joseph B. (2002). Schachter, Hershel (ed.). Shiurei HaRav HaGaon Rabi Yosef Dov HaLevi Soloveitchik zt'l Al Pesahim, Rosh HaShanah, Yom HaKippurim U'Megilah – MiPi HaShmuah שיעורי הרב הגאון רבי יוסף דב הלוי סולוביצ'יק זצ"ל על פסחים, ר"ה, יוהכ"פ ומגילה – מפי השמועה [Lessons of HaGaon Rabbi Joseph Ber HaLevi Soloveitchik zt'l on Passover, Rosh Hashanah, Yom Kippur and the Megillah – From Hearsay] (PDF) (in Hebrew). p. 166.
- Soloveitchik, Joseph B. (2003). Schachter, Hershel (ed.). Shiurei HaRav HaGaon Rabi Yosef Dov HaLevi Soloveitchik zt'l LeMasekhet Gittin – MiPi HaShmuah שיעורי הרב הגאון רבי יוסף דב הלוי סולוביצ'יק זצ"ל למס' גיטין – מפי השמועה [Lessons of HaGaon Rabbi Joseph Ber HaLevi Soloveitchik zt'l on Tractate Gittin – From Hearsay] (in Hebrew). New Jersey. p. 209. ISBN 979-8788105925.
- Soloveitchik, Joseph B. (2004) [2001]. Schachter, Hershel (ed.). Shiurei HaRav HaGaon Rabi Yosef Dov HaLevi Soloveitchik zt'l LeMasekhet Kiddushin – MiPi HaShmuah שיעורי הרב הגאון רבי יוסף דב הלוי סולוביצ'יק זצ"ל למס' קידושין – מפי השמועה [Lessons of HaGaon Rabbi Joseph Ber HaLevi Soloveitchik zt'l on Tractate Kiddushin – From Hearsay] (in Hebrew). New Jersey. p. 399.
- Soloveitchik, Joseph B. (2004). Schachter, Hershel (ed.). Shiurei HaRav HaGaon Rabi Yosef Dov HaLevi Soloveitchik zt'l Al Masekhet Shabbat – MiPi HaShmuah שיעורי הרב הגאון רבי יוסף דב הלוי סולוביצ'יק זצ"ל על מס' שבת – מפי השמועה [Lessons of HaGaon Rabbi Joseph Ber HaLevi Soloveitchik zt'l on Tractate Shabbat – From Hearsay] (in Hebrew). Mevaseret Zion. p. 297.
- Schachter, Hershel (2007). Ginat Egoz: Biurei Sugyot U'Birurei Halakha גנת אגוז: ביאורי סוגיות ובירורי הלכה [Walnut Garden: Explanations of Issues and Clarifications on Jewish Law] (in Hebrew). Flatbush School. p. 229. ISBN 9780881254105.
- Schachter, Hershel (2010). Divrei HaRav – Maran HaRav Yosef Dov HaLevi Soloveitchik zt'l: Likutei Drashot, Teurei Ma'asim, Divrei Ha'arakha דברי הרב – מרן הרב יוסף דוב הלוי סולוביצ'יק, זצ"ל: לקוטי דרשות, תיאורי מעשים, דברי הערכה [Words of The Rav – Rabbi Joseph Ber HaLevi Soloveitchik zt'l: A Collection of Sermons, Descriptions of Deeds, Words of Appreciation] (in Hebrew). Mesorah Publications. p. 382.
- Soloveitchik, Joseph B. (2013). Schachter, Hershel (ed.). Shiurei HaRav HaGaon Rabi Yosef Dov HaLevi Soloveitchik zt'l Al Hilkhot Niddah – MiPi HaShmuah שיעורי הרב הגאון רבי יוסף דב הלוי סולוביצ'יק זצ"ל על הל' נדה – מפי השמועה [Lessons of HaGaon Rabbi Joseph Ber HaLevi Soloveitchik zt'l on the Laws of Niddah – From Hearsay] (in Hebrew). Kokhav Ya'akov. p. 133.
- Schachter, Hershel (2017). Weissman, Allan (ed.). Rav Schachter on the Parsha (PDF) (1st ed.). Shikey Press. p. 296. ISBN 978-1958542323.
- Schachter, Hershel (2018). Weissman, Allan (ed.). Rav Schachter on the Moadim (PDF) (1st ed.). Shikey Press. p. 297. ISBN 978-1933143521.
- Schachter, Hershel (2019). Weissman, Allan (ed.). Rav Schachter on the Haggadah (1st ed.). Feldheim. p. 269. ISBN 978-1680251050.
- Schachter, Hershel (2020). Weissman, Allan (ed.). Rav Schachter on Tefillah (PDF) (1st ed.). Shikey Press. p. 313.
- Schachter, Hershel (2023). Weissman, Allan (ed.). Rav Schachter on the Parsha Volume II (PDF) (1st ed.). Shikey Press. ISBN 978-1958542415.
- Schachter, Hershel (2023). Weissman, Allan (ed.). Rav Schachter on Pirkei Avos: Insights and Commentary Based on the Shiurim of Rav Hershel Schachter (1st ed.). p. 267.
- Schachter, Hershel (2023). Weissman, Allan (ed.). Rav Shachter on the Parsha Volume III: Insights and Commentary Based on the Shiurim of Rav Hershel Schachter (1st ed.). Shikey Press.
- Schachter, Hershel (2024). Miller, Joseph (ed.). Rabbi Hershel Schachter's Collected Writings I (1st ed.). ISBNservices.com. p. 220. ISBN 979-8893420111.
- Schachter, Hershel (2024). Feldman, Daniel Z.; Rice, Isaac (eds.). Divrei Soferim: The Transmission of Torah Shebe'al Peh (1st ed.). Toby Press. p. 184. ISBN 978-1592646807.
- Schachter, Hershel (2024). Weissman, Allan (ed.). Rav Schachter on Orach Chaim Volume I: Insights and Commentary Based on the Shiurim of Rav Hershel Schachter Hilchos Hanhagas Adam BaBoker, Tzitzis, and Tefillin (1st ed.). RIETS Press.
- Schachter, Hershel (2025). Weissman, Allan (ed.). Rav Schachter on Orach Chaim Volume II: Insights and Commentary Based on the Shiurim of Rav Hershel Schachter Hilchos Birchos HaShachar, Krias Shema, and Tefilah (1st ed.). RIETS Press.

=== Articles ===
Schachter has written more than 200 articles, in both Hebrew and English, for scholarly Torah publications such as HaPardes, HaDarom, Beit Yitzchak, and Or Hamizrach. A sample of these include:

- בגדר מצות קידוש והבדלה in HaDarom No. 26, Tishrei 5728 (September 1967)
- בדין מוקצה מחמת ספק יום שעבר in HaDarom No. 39, Nissan 5734 (April 1974)
- בירור הלכה בענין אמירה לנכרי בשבת וכבוד המת in HaPardes No. 57, Vol. 8 (May 1983)

== Works about ==
- Lawrence Kaplan, "The Multi-Faceted Legacy of the Rav: A Critical Analysis of R. Hershel Schachter's Nefesh ha-Rav," BDD (Bekhol Derakhekha Daehu: Journal of Torah and Scholarship) 7 (Summer, 1998): 51–85.
- Ferziger, Adam S. “Feminism and Heresy: The Construction of a Jewish Metanarrative.” Journal of the American Academy of Religion 77, no. 3 (2009): 494–546.
