= Chaim Walder =

Israeli author (1968–2021)

- חיים ולדר
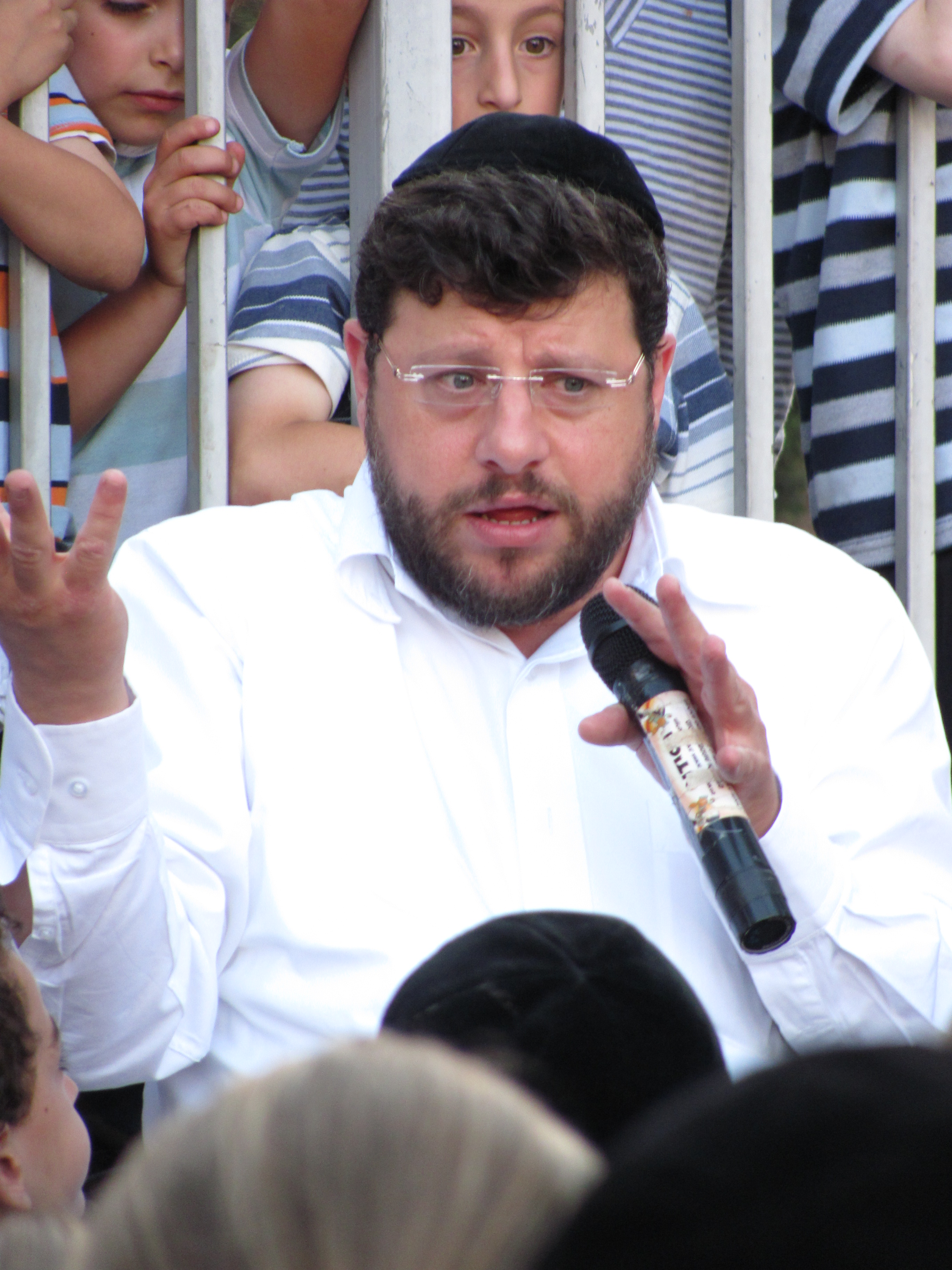
- Walder at an outdoor event in 2011
- Born: Chaim Eliezer Walder; 15 November 1968; Haifa, Israel
- Died: 27 December 2021 (aged 53); Petah Tikva, Israel
- Cause of death: Suicide by gunshot
- Occupations: Manager of Center for the Child and Family, Bnei Brak

Chaim Eliezer Walder (Hebrew: חיים אליעזר ולדר, romanized: Ḥayyim Eliʿezer Valder; 15 November 1968 – 27 December 2021) was an Israeli Haredi author of literature for children, adolescents, and adults. In 1993, he became an Israeli publishing sensation with his bestselling first book, Yeladim Mesaprim al Atzmam (Hebrew: ילדים מספרים על עצמם, Children Tell About Themselves, translated into English as Kids Speak), which revolutionized literature for Haredi children by introducing young protagonists who speak openly about their problems and feelings, and opened the door for many more writers to produce original fiction for Haredi youth. Walder was a long-time columnist on social issues for the Hebrew daily Yated Ne'eman, an educational counselor, and manager of the Center for the Child and Family, operated by the Bnei Brak municipality.

In November 2021, an investigative piece by Haaretz reported several women's allegations of sexual assault committed by Walder while they were under his care as a therapist. Two of the accusers were minors at the time of the reputed assaults. Afterwards, over 25 women came forward with further accusations against Walder. The Safed rabbinical court found that over a period of 25 years, Walder had sexually abused women, girls, and boys that had come to him for treatment.

On 27 December 2021, Walder committed suicide, at the age of 53. The allegations and death divided the Haredi community on the appropriate response to allegations of sexual abuse and was described as the community's #MeToo moment.

== Early life ==
Walder was born in Haifa and raised in a Haredi family. His father was from Jerusalem and his mother from Haifa. He attended Yeshivat Kol Torah and Knesses Chizkiyahu and married at age 21. He served in the Israel Defense Forces as a soldier-teacher.

== Teaching and writing ==
After his discharge, he began teaching in a Haredi ḥeder in Bnei Brak. When he began having trouble with an unruly child, he decided to write a story from the child's point of view and read it in front of the entire class, hoping that the child would receive the message and calm down. As the other students were transfixed by the story, he began writing more stories from the children's point of view and reading them aloud. He also encouraged his students to write down any problems or dilemmas that they were experiencing and send him a letter at his post-office box. As his "story hour" became a fixture in the classroom, one of the mothers of the children encouraged him to publish a book. To gauge public interest, he first printed some of his stories in the Yated Ne'eman; when they were received positively, he decided to publish a book. On the advice of the Premishlaner Rebbe of Bnei Brak, he borrowed money and self-published 2,000 copies of his book, Yeladim Mesaprim al Atzmam (Children Tell About Themselves). Within ten days, the entire run sold out.

In 1996, Walder published his first novel for children, Korim li Tzviki Green! (Hebrew: קוראים לי צביקי גרין, My Name is Tzviki Green!, translated into English as That's Me, Tzviki Green!). He named the protagonist after his eldest son Meir Zvi (Zviki), then four years old. By 2011, he had published 26 volumes of stories and novels for children and adults. More than two million copies of his books are in print.

From 1990 to 2021, Walder was a regular columnist for the Yated Ne'eman, writing about social issues. He also hosted a popular radio talk show. He headed the Center for the Child and Family, run by the Bnei Brak municipality, and was a certified educational counselor working with children who have suffered trauma and abuse. In 2003, he received the Magen LeYeled (Defender of the Child) award from the Israel National Council for the Child.

== Yeladim Mesaprim al Atzmam ==
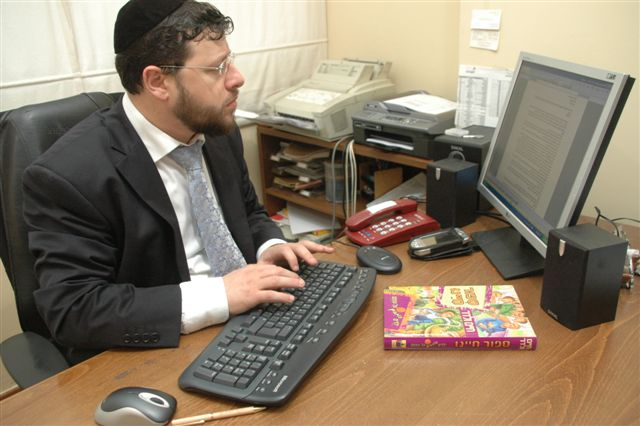
Walder in his office in 2009

Walder's first book, Yeladim Mesaprim al Atzmam (Children Tell About Themselves), revolutionized Haredi children's literature by eschewing the "programmatic and religious-indoctrination tone" that had previously characterized books for this age group and introducing the "language of the emotions". The protagonist in each story speaks from the heart about his or her problems and feelings, and the language is "direct and grown-up". The stories are all written in the first person; many are based on true-life incidents which were told to Walder. From the time of the publication of the first book in 1993, thousands of children wrote letters to Walder and shared their own feelings and challenges. In 2011, Walder estimated that he had received over 20,000 letters in Hebrew and 10,000 letters in other languages. From these letters, he learned more about how children think, what interests them, what makes them laugh, and what their fears and worries are. He made use of the stories sent by children as well as his understanding of a child's mind to craft the plots and dialogue in his tales.

In addition to becoming one of the top five bestselling books ever in Israel, Yeladim Mesaprim al Atzmam has been translated into eight languages. It paved the way for many new writers to begin publishing "imaginative, thoughtful, emotional, and enjoyable" literature for Haredi children and young adults, a phenomenon that has surged since the late 1990s.

As of 2011, the Yeladim Mesaprim al Atzmam series stood at six volumes. Walder also published two Yeladim Kotvim al Atzmam (Children Write About Themselves) collections and an adult version of Yeladim Mesaprim al Atzmam titled Anashim Mesaprim al Atzmam (Hebrew: אנשים מספרים על עצמם, People Tell About Themselves, translated into English as People Speak), which presented adult-themed stories that came up on his radio show. Factuality of stories printed is not a given. Asked whether a particular story included in People Speak was true, Walder responded in the negative, stating that "most of it is made up."

In the early 2000s, Walder developed a therapeutic summer camp called Yeladim Mesaprim al Atzmam. At these camps in Bnei Brak, Jerusalem, and Haifa, campers are encouraged to explore new avenues of expression, such as writing and acting out stories.

== Sexual assaults ==
On 12 November 2021, Haaretz reported allegations from several women of Walder having sexually assaulted them for years. One of the alleged victims was 12 when the alleged exploitation began; another was 15, and the third was Walder's therapy patient. Subsequently, over twenty women came forward with accusations against Walder, but he denied any wrongdoing.

On 16 November, Eichlers of Boro Park announced that they would no longer carry Walder's books, followed by Osher Ad on 17 November. On 18 November, Aryeh Klapper, senior judge of the Boston Beit Din, ruled that Walder's books should be immediately removed from stores and shelves. Also on the 18th, Feldheim, Walder's publisher, which had earlier released several statements in support of their author, announced they were suspending American sales.

In December 2021, the Safed Beth Din found that over a period of twenty-five years, Walder had sexually abused women, boys, and girls that had come to him for treatment. His victims included a female counsellor who worked at his summer camp, a 9-year-old boy and a 12-year-old boy who attended the camp, and a 9-year-old boy that had been abused over a decade ago after coming to Walder for treatment. Twenty-two witnesses, including victims, dayanim, and therapists testified about sexual assaults occurring at Walder's bookstore in Bnei Brak, his office, and hotels. One of the victims said she was thirteen when Walder first raped her; another said she had sought help from Walder because of mental and financial distress. Several therapists testified that their patients had been abused by Walder. A kiruv (Jewish outreach) worker, who worked with ex-Haredi youths, reported that Walder had assaulted a boy and girl that had come to him for treatment. In one of the recordings presented to Beth Din, Walder was heard coaxing a young woman to conceal evidence and withdraw her testimony and threatening to commit suicide if their relationship was exposed. Walder was summoned to the Safed Beth Din, but refused to attend.

One victim was a relative of Walder who was groomed and abused by him after being referred to his care. She complained to the police in 2018 but the case was dropped due to a lack of evidence. She said she later entered into a non-disclosure agreement with Walder in exchange for payment, which Bracha Walder, Walder's wife, sought to renew after rumours of her husband's sexual misconduct started to circulate. However, she decided to testify at the Safed Beth Din because she could no longer remain silent.

The Chief Rabbi of Safed, Shmuel Eliyahu, said that Walder's guilt was beyond doubt and that one should not keep his books in their homes or schools, adding that Walder was a danger to society whose forbidden acts had destroyed lives. He said his ruling was based on testimonies, other court rulings, pictures and recordings. The senior judges of the Bnei Brak Beth Din, Yehuda Silman and Sariel Rosenberg, ruled it was forbidden to read his books. Walder sent threats to Eliyahu and Silman and the women that had testified.

Yedioth Ahronoth separately received testimony from five women that had been abused by Walder including friends of the family and a 15-year-old babysitter that had looked after his children.

After the allegations became public, Walder announced that he was stepping back from public life to "fight to clear his name and be with his family."

On 26 December, Haaretz reported that the Israel Police had opened an investigation into Walder but that he had not yet been questioned. On the same day, his family reported Walder missing after days of isolation.

On 27 December 2021, Walder was found dead next to the grave of his son (who died in 2019 from cancer) in Petah Tikva by a self-inflicted gunshot wound. He was eulogized at his funeral by Natan Zukhovsky, Chananya Chollak and the mayor of Bnei Brak, Avraham Rubinstein.

A few days later, Shifra Yocheved Horovitz, one of Walder's victims, committed suicide at age 24 after seeing Walder eulogized in the Haredi press. A month after Walder's burial, footage emerged of individuals burning his books next to his grave.

=== Orthodox reaction ===
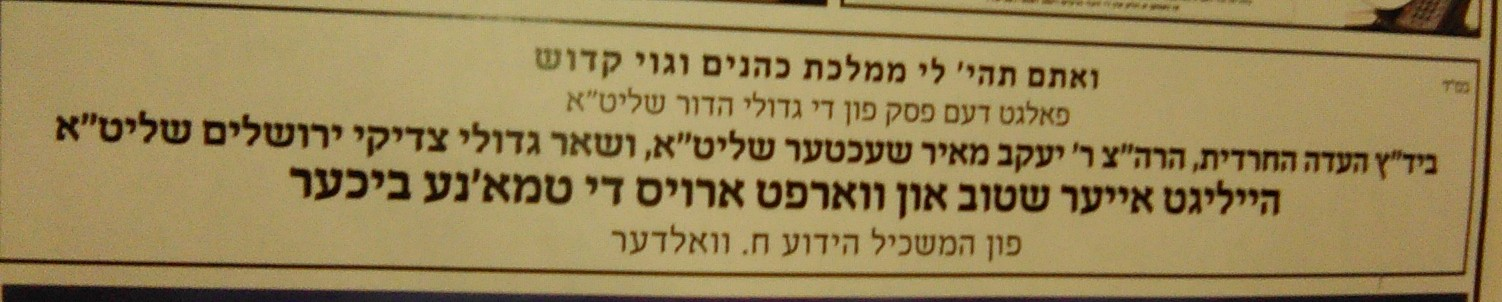
Yiddish-language poster calling for Jews to "throw out the impure books of the known maskil (lit. 'intellectual'; pejorative: reformer) H. Walder" from their homes.

The allegations and Walder's death roiled the Haredi community in what was described as the community's #MeToo Moment. There was huge online interest and on the day of Walder's death, three of the top four Google searches in Israel related to Walder.

After the allegations became public, the supermarket chain, Osher Ad, and the Jewish bookstore, Eichler's, stopped selling Walder's books. Other retailers followed suit including Lehmanns, a European bookseller. Aryeh Klapper, senior judge of the Boston Beit Din, ruled that Walder's books should be immediately removed from stores and shelves.Yated Ne'eman suspended Walder's weekly column, and Radio Kol Chai dropped Walder's program. However, Israeli politician Yitzhak Pindrus sent Walder a message of support, wishing him strength and courage.

After Walder's death, Shmuel Eliyahu and Reuven Nakar, who sat on the Safed Beth Din, reiterated their certainty of Walder's guilt and expressed solidarity with his victims. David Stav said that the Haredi community had a duty to publish the allegations of Walder's sexual abuse to prevent further abuse even if it risked his suicide. David Leibel strongly condemned Walder and his supporters and Sholom Kamenetsky described Walder as an unrepentant sinner until the end. Yitzchak Breitowitz said Walder's suicide could be described as a final act of abuse towards his victims and Ron Yitzchok Eisenman said he could not remain silent to the victims' pain and the victim-blaming taking place. Yosef Yitzchak Jacobson said the episode had made it difficult for people to trust respected figures. Asher Melamed, the founder of the Israeli Protection Centre for victims of sexual abuse, praised Eliyahu for tackling this contentious issue and said that while serving as Rabbi to the Israeli Police, he had heard of allegations against Walder five years ago. Moshe Meiselman said that warning the community about a sexual predator was not lashon hara (slander) and that Walder was a well-known evildoer. Meiselman was criticised by Michael Tobin for wrongly portraying Walder as a non-Haredi and for claiming that observing the laws of yichud prevented abuse. RIETS rosh yeshiva Daniel Feldman also wrote that broadcasting the repugnancy of a sin was not lashon hara and Aharon Feldman wrote that a community is obligated to support victims and remove abusers from every communal position.

By contrast, senior Haredi rabbi, Gershon Edelstein claimed that Walder had wrongly been publicly shamed by his critics; an act tantamount to murder and worse than illicit sexual relationships. Edelstein and Chaim Kanievsky had six months prior written a personal endorsement of Walder's latest book. Yehoshua Eichenstein similarly claimed that Walder's detractors were guilty of his murder and that teachers should educate their students of the injustice perpetrated against him by wicked people. He later moderated his stance after meeting with seven of the victims. Chief Rabbi David Lau visited the Walder family who were sitting shiva but did not offer comment on Walder's behavior or offer support to his victims until much later, for which he was roundly criticized. Consequently, several members of the Rabbinical Council of America decided to boycott a meeting with Lau. Nissim ben Shimon, who had previously defended Eliezer Berland, said Walder was a great person who did many good deeds. Tzvi Tau said that Walder was the victim of a plot and one should not believe the accusations which were all lies, and though he later met with Eliyahu and said they had "settled their differences", he reiterated this view in a public letter in early January. Rafi Feuerstein said that he had removed Tau's books from his library, in addition to Walder's, in protest at his comments. In November 2022, the Israeli Police opened an investigation into accusations that Tau had sexually abused minors; the Walder story had convinced his alleged victims to go public. Zev Leff said that victims of sexual abuse should not be believed unless their claims are tested in beth din in front of the accused, and that Walder wrongly lost his livelihood after his books were banned. Tziporah Heller said that lashon hara had killed Walder and that people were not allowed to judge him, only Hashem or an appointed dayan could do this; though after facing a backlash, she clarified that she had been uninformed and in denial.

Haredi activists in Israel distributed around 320,000 flyers in protest of the leadership's response to the sexual abuse accusations. The leaflets said "We all believe the victims" and depicted a distressed child with someone's hand covering her mouth with a bracelet on the wrist reading "lashon hara does not talk to me".

==== Media response ====
The Haredi media downplayed the sexual assault allegations. The Haredi website Behadrei Haredim was criticised for its sanitised eulogy of Walder. The Yated Ne'eman, which had dropped Walder's column a few weeks previously, published a panegyric about Walder which used the honorific "May the memory of the righteous be a blessing" and avoided any mention of his alleged abuse, as did Kikar HaShabbat. The Hamodia said it would be "taking the high road" by avoiding reporting on recent matters as doing so would contravene the rules on purity and tznius. However, the weekly Ami Magazine carried an interview with Shmuel Eliyahu who spoke of the importance of tackling child abuse and Mishpacha, while not explicitly mentioning Walder, published an editorial about the importance of listening to victims of sexual abuse.

The Economist said that as young Haredim received more uncensored information, their elderly leaders "seem increasingly out of touch." Anshel Pfeffer wrote of a growing disconnect between Haredi leaders and its youth who could no longer be lied to. Isabel Kershner of the New York Times wrote of a growing gap between the insular Haredim and the more modern ones that engaged with the outside world and used social media. Chen Sror said that David Lau was representative of the older Haredi generation which was seeking to preserve its hegemony in which predators enjoyed protection. Nehemiah Rosenfeld wrote that the Haredi media's distorted coverage was a turning point in the relationship between the media and the Haredi public. In a Times of Israel op-ed, Scott Kahn wrote that the Haredi media's posthumous lionising of a serial sexual abuser showed contempt towards Walder's victims. Chana Hughes, writing in the Jewish Chronicle, referred to Walder as the Haredi Jimmy Savile.

Aaron Rabinowitz, co-author of the Haaretz expose, said that after writing about Haredi sexual offenders, he had received hundreds of stories from victims of sexual abuse in the Haredi community. He and his fellow author, Shira Elek, were invited to a senior rabbi in Bnei Brak to present their findings about Walder and were encouraged to urge the Haredi community to seek change. Rabinowitz received abuse from some of Walder's supporters on social media for breaking the story.

== Published works ==
=== Children's literature ===
- ילדים מספרים על עצמם [Children Talk About Themselves]. Sifrati. 1993.
  - English edition: Kids Speak: Children Talk About Themselves, Feldheim Publishers, 1994, ISBN 0-87306-672-3
- ילדים מספרים על עצמם 2 [Children Talk About Themselves, Vol. 2]. Sifrati. 1994.
  - English edition: Kids Speak 2: Children Talk About Themselves, Feldheim, 1995, ISBN 0-87306-720-7
- ילדים מספרים על עצמם 3 [Children Talk About Themselves, Vol. 3]. Sifrati.
  - English edition: Kids Speak 3: Children Talk About Themselves, Feldheim, 1997, ISBN 0-87306-830-0
- ילדים מספרים על עצמם 4 [Children Talk About Themselves, Vol. 4]. Sifrati. 2000.
  - English edition: Kids Speak 4: Children Talk About Themselves, Feldheim, 2000, ISBN 1-58330-442-8
- ילדים מספרים על עצמם 5 [Children Talk About Themselves, Vol. 5]. Sifrati.
  - English edition: Kids Speak 5: Children Talk About Themselves, Feldheim, 2006, ISBN 1-58330-912-8
- ילדים מספרים על עצמם 6 [Children Talk About Themselves, Vol. 6]. Sifrati.
  - English edition: Kids Speak 6: Through Fire and Water, Feldheim, 2011
- קוראים לי צביקי גרין [Call Me Tzviki Green!]. Sifrati. 1996.
  - English edition: That's Me, Tzviki Green!, Feldheim, 1997, ISBN 0-87306-825-4
- הגיבורים שלנו: ילדים בעקבות העבר [Our Heroes: Children in the footsteps of the past]. Chaim Walder Publishing.
  - English edition: Our Heroes: Kids follow in the footsteps of the past, Feldheim, 1998, ISBN 0-87306-866-1
- הגיבורים שלנו 2: ילדים בעקבות העבר [Our Heroes: Children in the footsteps of the past, Volume 2]. Chaim Walder Publishing.
  - English edition: Our Heroes 2: Kids follow in the footsteps of the past, Feldheim, ___, ISBN 1-58330-764-8
- סיפורים מתוך הלב של אורי [Stories from Uri's Heart]. 2004. (with Ahuva Raanan)
  - English edition: Stories Straight From Avi's Heart: A collection of stories for young children to enrich their emotional world, Feldheim, 2004, ISBN 1-58330-720-6
- סיפורים מתוך הלב של אמא [Stories from Mommy's Heart]. (with Ahuva Raanan)
  - English edition: Stories Straight from Mommy's Heart: A collection of stories which strengthen the emotional bond between parents and children, Feldheim, 2007, ISBN 978-1-58330-989-6
- סיפורים מתוך הלב של תמי [Stories from Tammy's Heart]. Chaim Walder Publishing.
- ספור חיינו: ילדים כותבים על עצמם [Story of Our Lives: Children write about themselves]. Chaim Walder Publishing.
  - English edition: Real Kids: Children write about their lives, Feldheim, 2008, ISBN 1-59826-231-9
- זה קרא באמת: ילדים כותבים על עצמם 2 [This Really Happened: Children write about themselves 2]. Chaim Walder Publishing. 2009.
  - English edition: Real Kids 2: Children write about their lives, Feldheim, 2012, ISBN 978-1-59826-505-7

=== Adult literature ===
- אנשים מספרים על עצמם [People Talk About Themselves]. Chaim Walder Publishing.
  - English edition: People Speak: People talk ... about themselves!, Feldheim, 2002, ISBN 1-58330-510-6
- אנשים מספרים על עצמם 2 [People Talk About Themselves 2]. Chaim Walder Publishing. 2003.
  - English edition: People Speak 2: More people talk ... about themselves!, Feldheim, 2003, ISBN 1-58330-609-9
- אנשים מספרים על עצמם 3 [People Talk About Themselves 3]. Chaim Walder Publishing.
  - English edition: People Speak 3: Everyone has a story, Feldheim, 2008, ISBN 1-59826-175-4
- אנשים מספרים על עצמם 4 [People Talk About Themselves 4]. Chaim Walder Publishing.
  - English edition: People Speak 4: For the people...by the people, Feldheim, 2010, ISBN 1-59826-669-1
- שימו לב אל הנשמה [Listen to the Soul].
  - English edition: Listen to the Soul: Stories of the heart and spirit, Feldheim, 1996, ISBN 0-87306-780-0
- Subject to Change: Stories of the heart and spirit. Feldheim. 1999. ISBN 1-58330-404-5.
- מאחורי המסיכה [Behind the Mask].
  - English edition: Behind the Mask, and other stories, Feldheim, 2006, ISBN 1-58330-861-X
- עצות מהחיים [Advice from Life]. Chaim Walder Publishing.
  - English edition: Advice for Life: The things that really matter to us, Feldheim, 2010, ISBN 1-59826-549-0

== See also ==
- Yehuda Meshi Zahav
