= Melech Schachter =

Rabbi Melech Schachter

Personal life
- Born: Marcus (Elimelech) Schachter; April 7, 1913 Suceava, Austria-Hungary
- Died: February 27, 2007 (aged 93)
- Spouse: Claire (Chaya) Schachter
- Children: Hershel Schachter, Sara Steinberg
- Parent(s): Morris and Mary Schachter
- Education: Yeshiva University

Religious life
- Religion: Judaism
- Denomination: Orthodox
- Yeshiva: RIETS
- Position: Rosh yeshiva
- Semikhah: RIETS

Melech Schachter (Hebrew: אלימלך שכטר, April 7, 1913 - February 27, 2007) was a pulpit rabbi, coordinator of Jewish divorce, and instructor at Yeshiva University for over fifty years.

== Life ==
=== Education ===
Schachter was born in Suceava, in the Duchy of Bukovina, several years before the city became part of Romania. He studied at the Viznitz Yeshiva, and arrived in America as a teenager, at the age of fifteen. After receiving his bachelor's degree from Yeshiva College and semikha from Rabbi Moshe Soloveichik, he also received a Ph.D. from Dropsie College in Philadelphia. His doctoral dissertation discussed the variant versions of the Mishnah between the Babylonian Talmud and the Jerusalem Talmud and was eventually published by Mossad HaRav Kook.

=== Career ===
Schachter served many rabbinic roles over his career, including the pulpit rabbi in various communities such as Scranton, Pennsylvania, and The Bronx, New York. He went on to serve as the coordinator of the Rabbinical Council of America's Beth Din for Gittin (Jewish Divorce) and Halitza. In addition to teaching in the RIETS Semikha program, he also taught at Stern College for Women and the Wurzweiler School of Social Work. In 1997, Rabbi Norman Lamm granted him an honorary degree for his achievements as a Torah scholar and rabbi. Schachter consulted with Rabbi Moshe Feinstein on a number of issues regarding Gittin and Geirut, such as the use of a polygraph by a husband who is fully paralyzed to commission the writing of a Get and relying on a pregnancy test to allow a woman who converts to Judaism to marry immediately. He was an expert on the spelling of names in a Get and was often consulted by younger rabbis on issues of Halacha and gave generously of his time to train them.

=== Death ===
Schachter died at the age of 93 on February 27, 2007. His son is Rabbi Hershel Schachter

=== Legacy ===
Schachter would often relate at family gatherings the following story as told by his grandson Rabbi Shay Schachter:

When he was raising his son (Hershel Schachter), my father, in the Bronx, he said he was a poor rabbi of a small shul he didn't have any money, so when it came to my father's bar mitzvah they made a small kiddush with pickles and herring after davening. That was the whole bar mitzvah. And he said there was a conservative rabbi who was the rabbi of the shul a few blocks away, and he saw a crowd of people standing outside. He asked them what's going on, and they said well, Rav Melech Schachter is making a bar mitzvah for his son Hershel. So, he said "Oh, I'm friendly with Reb Melech!" So, he went in to wish mazel tov, and he gave my grandfather a bracha - which my grandfather used to repeat at every one of our family simchas - and he said that "I hope someday in the future Hershel won't be known as 'Rav Melech's son.' I hope you'll be known as 'Hershel's father.'"...
My grandfather used to tell us, "You guys don't understand your father is a walking Sefer Torah. It's true, although I was a pretty famous person... it was not long before nobody remembered who I was and I became known as "Hershel's father". There was nothing that gave me more pride... I hope there will come a time when they'll forget me and they'll forget your father and they'll only think about the grandchildren and they'll refer to all of us as the grandparents and the parents of all of you..."

== Published works ==
- HaMishnah HaBavli vehaYerushalmi, hashva'at nuschaoteha, Mossad HaRav Kook, Jerusalem, 1959
- Tziyun leNefesh Haya, a responsum regarding commissioning the writing of a Get via telephone, published in Kevod HaRav page 268 and Eretz HaTzvi page 271
- Practical Halakhah in the Space Age, Tradition: A Journal of Orthodox Jewish Thought, Vol. 2, No. 1 (Fall 1959), pp. 155–163
- "Various Aspects of Adoption," The Journal of Halacha and Contemporary Society vol. 4, no. 2 (Fall 1982): 93:115
- Lectures and articles on YUTorah.org

== Further reading and links ==
- Hesped for Rabbi Melech Schachter
- An Irritating Name in a Get - Rav Melech Schachter’s zt"l Resolution of a Tense Situation by Rabbi Chaim Jachter
- Rabbi Melech Schachter
