= Sexual abuse cases in Brooklyn's Haredi community =

The response of the Haredi Jewish community in Brooklyn, New York City, to allegations of sexual abuse against its spiritual leaders has drawn scrutiny from inside and outside the Jewish community. When teachers, rabbis, and other leaders have been accused of sexual abuse, authorities in the Haredi community have often failed to report offenses to the police, intimidated witnesses, and encouraged shunning against victims and those members of the community who speak out against cases of abuse, although work has been done within Jewish communities to begin to address the issue of sexual abuse. Additionally, the existence of sexual abuse has also been used to promote stereotypes or fuel Antisemitic conspiracy theories.

== Prevalence and under-reporting ==
The greater New York City area is home to the largest Haredi community outside of Israel. About a quarter million Haredim—who are often called ultra-Orthodox, though they themselves do not like that label—live in New York City, most of them in Brooklyn. According to scholars, the rate of sex abuse within Haredi communities is roughly the same as anywhere else. However, for generations, most victims have not come forward with accusations because of stigmatization from the community, and when they did come forward, the matter generally stayed within the community, rather than being reported to the police and forming part of crime statistics.

Sexual abuse within the community is often not reported to police. Many feel that to report a Jew to non-Jewish authorities constitutes the religious crime of mesirah: Samuel Heilman, a professor of Jewish studies at Queens College, writes that one reason why cases or patterns of sexual abuse are rarely reported to law enforcement is because "they think that anyone who turns over anyone to the outside authorities is committing a transgression to the community at large". The accuser is then considered a Moser, literally translating to "one who hands over" in the sense of the informant who turns over a Jew to secular authorities. Agudath Israel of America, a leading Haredi organization, has stated that observant Jews should not report allegations to law enforcement without first consulting with a rabbi. Heilman adds that some wish to protect the community's reputation and the accused's family, and that the rabbis worry that outside scrutiny could weaken their authority: "They are more afraid of the outside world than the deviants within their own community", since "the deviants threaten individuals here or there, but the outside world threatens everyone and the entire structure of their world". However, other rabbis, including a Chabad-Lubavitch rabbinic court in Crown Heights and Yosef Blau, disagree, and encourage reporting abusers to police, stating that the ban on mesirah does not apply. Rather than reporting to police, Haredim may take a case of sexual abuse to the shomrim, a local Jewish street patrol. The shomrim keep the names of suspected child molesters on file, but do not share them with law enforcement or take other measures to end abuse, and sometimes try to discourage people from taking a case to the police.

Reports of abuse to religious authorities rarely result in punishment for the offender; as in the Catholic sex abuse cases—where child molesters were re-assigned to other dioceses—rabbis, teachers, and youth leaders found to be abusing children are usually re-assigned to another yeshiva, perhaps after seeing a board of rabbis.

Many of the people accused and/or convicted of sexual abuse and related charges in Brooklyn's Haredi community are rabbis. Others accused include a school principal, a spiritual adviser, and a social worker.

== Reprisal ==
Witness tampering is common in cases of sexual abuse. Reports emerged of victims and accusers (as well as families of victims and accusers) facing threats of violence, false police reports of child abuse, loss of kosher licenses or other harm to business, and/or eviction. They were pressured or offered bribes to not co-operate with prosecutors. Physical harassment, distribution of flyers attacking victims and advocates, and coercion also occurred frequently.

Establishment reprisal against sexually abused children and their parents could be severe: Parents were shunned by the community, with rabbis forbidding congregants to speak to them, while abused children were barred from schools and treated as undesirable marriage candidates by matchmakers, hurting the marriage prospects for other siblings and family members.

Prosecutors often faced difficulties due to a lack of cooperation from victims and communities. In many cases, victims refused to cooperate, often either out of fear of reprisal or after being bribed to remain silent. District Attorney Charles J. Hynes said, "As soon as we would give the name of a defendant ... (rabbis and others) would engage this community in a relentless search for the victims... And they're very, very good at identifying the victims. And then the victims would be intimidated and threatened, and the case would fall apart." Hynes described the intimidation that occurs in these cases as worse than anything else he had ever seen in his career, including mob cases and police corruption cases.

== Prosecution ==
Former Brooklyn district attorney Charles J. Hynes was responsible for many legal cases in the Haredi community until leaving office at the end of 2013, after losing re-election to Kenneth P. Thompson. Hynes received both praise and criticism for his handling of the cases. He was praised for starting a program in 2009 called Kol Tzedek (Voice of Justice), which is geared toward Haredi Jews and encourages them to co-operate with law enforcement; according to Hynes, it reduced the amount of victim intimidation. Since 2009, roughly 100 out of 5389 cases of sexual abuse in the district have come from the Haredi community. The first high-profile child sex abuse case that Hynes brought against the Hasidic community after his election in 1989, was that of Nechemya Weberman, an unlicensed youth counselor and prominent member of the Satmar community, who was convicted on December 10, 2012, of repeatedly sexually abusing a 12-year-old girl he was supposed to be counseling, and sentenced to 103 years in prison.

Hynes received criticism in other cases. Activists accused him of pandering to rabbis and those in power for political reasons, and not prosecuting cases aggressively enough. Described as "a velvet glove wrapped around a velvet fist", his approach did not publicize the names of defendants, even those who were convicted of abuse, and took other steps to remain in the good graces of religious leaders who took the side of accused molesters. In one complex series of cases, for example, after a prominent cantor was convicted of sexually abusing a 16-year-old boy, the boy's father was indicted by prosecutor Hynes for extortion based in part on testimony from a supporter of the cantor. The cantor's conviction was overturned in 2013 based on the father's "indictment and other technicalities".

At trials for these cases, expert witnesses inform the jury that Hasidic victims often do not come forward because the community is so insular.

Ben Hirsch, a spokesman for Survivors for Justice, criticized the handling of a case against Rabbi Yoel Malik. When Malik, a member of the Satmar Hasidic sect, was given a 60-day jail sentence for the abuse of students at the now closed Satmar yeshiva Ohr HaMeir, Hirsch stated, "What DA (Kenneth) Thompson has done is inexplicable", and claimed that, "Through unexplained plea deals such as this, he has effectively quashed any willingness on the part of victims to come forward". It was claimed that the victims were "extremely reluctant to testify publicly", according to a law enforcement source familiar with the case, as quoted in the NY Daily News.

== Victim advocacy ==
Rabbi Nuchem Rosenberg, a Hasidic Rabbi from the Satmar community in Williamsburg, created a hotline featuring weekly, impassioned lectures in Yiddish, Hebrew, and English - imploring victims to report sexual abuse to the authorities, while accusing community leaders of silencing the reporting of child abuse. Rosenberg also uses his social media presence to share his opinions on the state of child sexual abuse in the Jewish community, and chronicle his efforts and struggles as an activist.

In March 2016, Rosenberg discouraged his followers from participating in a protest against the alleged cover-up of child abuse in Yeshiva Oholei Torah of Crown Heights because it was to be attended by members of the gay community. "We will not stand in rank together with the faggots", Rosenberg wrote on his blog, "no matter how just the cause".

Rosenberg is often shunned by communal authorities, and there have been instances in which he was physically attacked. In 2008, flyers were posted around Williamsburg depicting a coiled snake around Rosenberg's head with the words "Nuchem Snake Rosenberg: Leave Tainted One!". Rosenberg has also been banned from Satmar synagogues by its authorities, and he alleges that he has been formally ostracized by several Rabbinic entities. Despite his decades of activism, Rosenberg has yet to be involved in the investigation, arrest, or prosecution of any member of any Jewish community for child sexual abuse.

Anti-abuse community activist Rabbi Tzvi Gluck has said that in 2011, a 30-year-old man molested a 14-year-old boy in a ritual bath; this case never made it to the police due to community pressure on the victim. A rabbi made the boy apologize to the molester for seducing him.

Monsey rabbi Yosef Yitzchak Jacobson has lectured on this topic, which disturbed some people, but also has brought awareness to the problem.

In 2019, responding to the increased publicity of sexual harassment and rape charges with the Me Too movement and the increased exposure of Catholic Church sexual abuse cases, the state of New York passed the Child Victims Act which allowed victims to sue their attackers within a one-year period. Other states have passed similar "lookback window" laws. Orthodox victims who had unsuccessfully brought civil action against their molesters in the past used the Child Victims Act to sue the individuals and institutions responsible.

== Notable cases ==
- In 2002, Rabbi Yechiel Brauner was convicted on the charges of Sexual Abuse in the 1st Degree and 3rd Degrees. He was sentenced to 11 years probation, with the condition that he must participate in a sex offender treatment program. He later reoffended in 2014 and pleaded guilty to the charge of forcible touching and sexual abuse of a young man.
- In 2008, Joel Kolko, a rabbi at Yeshiva Torah Temimah, pleaded guilty to the charge of endangering the welfare of a child after being accused of sexually abusing two of his first-grade students. Kolko was later charged with contempt for violating the order of protection associated with his plea. A jury found him not guilty at trial.
- In 2009, Yona Weinberg, a bar mitzvah tutor and licensed social worker from Flatbush, was convicted of molesting two boys under the age of 14. At his trial, where he was sentenced to 13 months in prison, the courtroom was packed with Weinberg's supporters who maintained his innocence. In response, presiding Justice Gordon L. Reichbach criticized the "communal attitude that seeks to blame, indeed punish, victims"; these victims had been kicked out of their schools and summer camps after coming forward with the allegations against Weinberg. Following his sentence, the New York Division of Criminal Justice Services notes that he now resides in the State of Israel.
- In 2009, Rabbi Israel Weingarten was convicted in a Brooklyn court of raping his daughter between the ages of nine and eighteen.
- Some boys have reported being molested while in the mikvah, a ritual bath that is considered a symbol of purity in Judaism.
- In 2011, a member of the community was charged by a local Special Victims Unit with witness tampering for sending threatening text messages to members of the Orthodox community urging them to pressure the family of an 11-year-old abuse victim to drop the case.
- Pearl Engleman, a member of the Satmar sect aged 64 in 2012, said she became an anti-abuse activist after her son was molested as a child by a rabbi at his yeshiva. Under New York law, his case could not be prosecuted since the statute of limitations had already expired.
- In 2012, Chabad-Lubavitch rabbi Moshe Keller was sentenced to three years' probation for molesting a then-15-year-old boy in 2009.
- In 2012, 53-year-old spiritual adviser Nechemya Weberman was accused of having molested a teenage girl, one of his students, over a period of several years. The girl had initially been sent to Weberman because she had been asking theological questions. Weberman, a member of the Satmar Hasidic community, was a widely respected figure in his community, with many unwilling to believe the allegations against him. As a result, the alleged victim was harassed and labeled a "slut", while her family and boyfriend received threats. A campaign called "Libel 75", started by Weberman's supporters, allege that he is innocent. A 48-year-old man named Abraham Rubin was charged with bribery, witness tampering, and coercion in connection with the case; offering the alleged victim and her family money, while suggesting they flee to Israel to avoid testifying. Three brothers, Jacob, Joseph, and Hertzka Berger, were also charged after they threatened and then removed the kosher certificate of a restaurant run by the family of the alleged victim's boyfriend. In 2012, Weberman was convicted on all 59 charges, and received 103 years. In 2013, the three brothers admitted to the coercion charges, but received no jail time. Rubin also pleaded guilty a couple of months later, and received four months. Following Weberman's conviction, the victim and her husband continued to face abuse and repercussions. The victim was shamed and driven from the synagogue on the high holy days; and several weeks prior to that, someone had thrown eggs at her husband’s store.
- In 2012, a woman from Kiryas Joel came forward with allegations that her 14-year-old son had been masturbated by a Hasidic man who worked at his Vizhnitz school. A rabbi allegedly tried to intimidate the mother into dropping the case. The boy was subsequently expelled from the school, and staff at the school also threatened to charge the mother with child abuse.
- Mordechai Jungreis, a 38-year-old father, claimed in 2012 that his mentally disabled teenage son had been molested in a mikveh by an older man. Jungreis said he first suspected the abuse after his son came home with blood in his underwear at age 12, and later was caught touching another child on the bus. Jungreis was harassed by other members of his community for coming forward with the allegations, including receiving messages on his answering machine filled with curses. Police later arrested the suspect, 27-year-old Meir Dascalowitz. In 2013, he pleaded guilty to sexual abuse. He was released in July 2016, re-arrested for parole violation a few months later, and was re-released in December 2017.
- On December 3, 2012, Emanuel Yegutkin, former principal of Elite High School for the children of Russian-American immigrants, was found guilty of sexually abusing three under-age brothers over the better part of a decade. The victims were not enrolled in Yegutkin's yeshiva. Yegutkin was charged with a variety of sexual crimes, and was found guilty of all 75 counts. On February 7, 2013, Yegutkin was sentenced to 55 years in prison for his crimes. The New York State Department of Corrections and Community Supervision issued Yegutkin Department Identification Number 13A1134. He was last incarcerated at Shawangunk Correctional Facility before a release to parole in 2024.
- On July 16, 2023, Jacob Daskal, an ex-leader of the Shomrim in Brooklyn, pled guilty to charges of coercing a minor to engage in illicit sexual conduct, transportation of a minor with intent to engage in criminal sexual activity and travelling with intent to engage in illicit sexual conduct after he had groomed and sexually assaulted a 15-year-old Haredi girl over a period of three months in 2017. He was later sentenced to 210 months in prison and a $250,000 fine for transporting a minor with intent to engage in criminal sexual activity.
- In 2024, a special education teacher (Friedman) at a Chabad school in Crown Heights has been sued for sexually abusing an 11-year-old boy. Following the lawsuit, Friedman was banned from entering the school by the school administrators according to Rabbi Menachem Vail, the associate director at Darchai Menachem.

== See also ==
- Hush
