= Augustus A. Beekman =

Augustus Anthony Beekman (March 28, 1923 – November 29, 2008) was the 23rd New York City Fire Commissioner.

== Biography ==
He was born on March 28, 1923, at Harlem Hospital in New York City and grew up in the Catholic Church-run orphanage, Little Flower Home, in Wading River, New York and was appointed the 23rd Fire Commissioner of the City of New York by Mayor Edward I. Koch on January 17, 1978, and served in that position until his resignation on November 5, 1980. He was the second African-American Fire Commissioner in the history of that position. Beekman died on November 29, 2008. He is survived by his wife and two children.

Fire appointments
Preceded by John T. O'Hagan	FDNY Commissioner; 1978–1980	Succeeded by Charles J. Hynes
