= Slave Theater =

Brooklyn community theater, now demolished

- Slave I
- Street view of the Slave Theater marquee, before the theater was demolished in 2016
- Interactive map of Slave Theater
- Former names: Regent Theater
- Address: 1215 Fulton Street
- Location: Brooklyn, New York 11216
- Coordinates: 40.680677°N 73.952772°W
- Type: Movie theater

Construction
- Built: 1910
- Opened: 1986
- Closed: 2012
- Demolished: 2016

Slave Theater, also called the Slave I, was a movie theater located at 1215 Fulton Street in Bedford–Stuyvesant, Brooklyn, New York City. The theater was founded in 1984 by Brooklyn judge John L. Phillips Jr. to screen a film he had produced and became a center of civil rights organizing in Brooklyn.

Phillips named the theater as a reminder of slavery as the origin of African-American and black American history. The name had a mixed reception by the Bed–Stuy community, but the theater became an emblem of Black pride in Brooklyn. After a complicated legal battle over ownership after Phillips's death, the theater was sold in 2013 and demolished in late 2016.

== History ==
In 1984, Brooklyn civil court judge John L. Phillips Jr. bought and renamed the Regent Theater (built in 1910). He had produced an interracial romance film Hands Across Two Continents and couldn't convince theaters to screen it, so he bought two theaters in Brooklyn to have the movie played. He renamed the Regent Theater the Slave Theater because, according to the website Brownstoner, he wanted to "remind everyone in the community, including himself, where they came from. He didn’t particularly care that many in that community were offended by the name, either". In response to in Queens later in the 1980s, Judge Phillips opened the theater as a space for the local Black community and civil rights work; Al Sharpton started holding weekly rallies at the theater, which he cites as a reason for increased civil rights organizing in Brooklyn at the time. For example, the Slave Theater was a gathering point for marches (and speeches by Al Sharpton and C. Vernon Mason) following the acquittal of John Vento and Keith Mondello for the murder of Yusef Hawkins in August 1989.

Judge Phillips was declared mentally unfit due to dementia in 2001 and died in 2008 due to neglect in a Brooklyn nursing home. For years, a series of guardians and estate lawyers had stolen most of Phillips's investments. Because he died without a will, the Slave Theater was left without funds to support itself and in unclear legal status. In the confusion, the theater fell into disrepair and was ordered vacated by the city of New York in 2012 after its patio collapsed during a party, injuring four people. A local group, the New Brooklyn Theatre began a Kickstarter fundraising campaign to try to buy the theater when it was put up for auction in 2012. The Slave Theater's manager and friend of Judge Phillips, Clarence Hardy, and his son Omar also claimed ownership of the property at the time. Clarence had been living in the building for years, at the behest of Judge Phillips. The Hardy family claimed that Judge Phillips had granted them ownership of the theater in 1999.

Street view of the Regent Theater marquee

A New York Surrogate's Court judge ruled that Judge Phillips had transferred the property to the Hardys when he was of unsound mind, and therefore granted ownership of 1215 Fulton Street to Phillips's nephew and executor Rev. Samuel L. Boykin of Akron, Ohio. Boykin characterized the Hardys, and a church that had been renting the upper floors of the theater, as squatters and planned to have them evicted from the site in 2012. Then, Boykin sold the theater to the Fulton Halsey Development Group in August 2013 for $2.1 million, before an appeal by the Hardys was completed. In his continued attempts to save the theater, Clarence Hardy protested the proposed demolition of the theater by standing on top of its roof and threatening to jump unless the theater was saved. Other anti-gentrification activists also opposed the theater's destruction by organizing community protests. Nonetheless, in December 2016, the lot's new owner Industrie Capital Partners demolished Slave Theater with plans to create a mixed-use development.

In 2019, a London firm called The Collective bought 1215 Fulton Street and several surrounding lots for $32.5 million dollars. The Collective stated that they are developing a plan for memorializing the history of the Slave Theater in the resulting mixed-use development.

== Architecture ==
=== Exterior ===
The main exterior alteration made by Judge Phillips was the installation of the Slave Theater's iconic black-and-white marquee.

=== Interior ===
Following its purchase in 1984 by Judge John L. Phillips, the interior was extensively altered.

The walls were covered with large-scale murals depicting figures from African and African-American history, global liberation movements, and popular culture. These included civil rights leaders, Black political figures, and martial arts iconography. Additional painted text elements included historical quotations and affirmations emphasizing Black identity and cultural pride.

Judge Phillips had community artists paint murals including Toussaint Louverture, Marcus Garvey, and Malcolm X, as well as one of Bruce Lee.

== In popular culture ==
=== Art ===
- Go-Rilla Means War installation and accompanying catalog by Crystal Z Campbell (2017)
- The Slave Theater photography exhibition by Hiroki Kobayashi (2010)

=== Film ===
- Slave One documentary (2017)
