= Jeff Strabone =

- Education: Dartmouth B.A. (Government)
- Alma mater: Northwestern M.A. (History), NYU M.A., M.Phil., Ph.D. (English)
- Known for: directelection.org

Jeff Strabone is a Brooklyn-based American scholar, political activist and civic leader. In 2016, his website directelection.org listed the names and addresses of members of the U.S. Electoral College, and he urged people to write to electors to ask them not to vote for president-elect Donald Trump, an effort which brought him national attention. As a civic leader in Brooklyn, he has been active in promoting theatre preservation, building codes and housing issues, hospital preservation, and traffic flow. He has been a leader of Brooklyn's Cobble Hill Association, a neighborhood preservation group. He is the co-founder and chairman of the New Brooklyn Theatre.

In 2008, he changed his middle name to Hussein as a show of solidarity with then presidential candidate Barack Obama, who was running for the office of president, and whose Muslim-sounding middle name had been widely commented on. He is an associate professor of English and teaches British and African literature, and he was granted tenure at Connecticut College in 2016. He commented about the post-election effort:

The electors are elected officials so we have every right to write to them ... There’s no place to get [their] addresses ... So I realized that if one person could do all the work — gathering their addresses, creating a downloadable, printable template for a letter and even the labels ... I decided to be that person ... it immediately went viral and people responded ...

— Strabone to the Brooklyn Daily Eagle, December 18, 2016

== Publications ==
- Poetry and British Nationalisms in the Bardic Eighteenth Century: Imagined Antiquities, 2018 by Palgrave Macmillan.
