= Brooklyn D.A. (miniseries) =

Six part CBS TV mini-series

Brooklyn D.A. was a six-part television mini-series that focused on "assistant district attorneys and other underlings of Brooklyn District Attorney Charles Hynes. It aired on CBS prior to the 2013 primary election. In defense of charges for having violated equal-time provisions CBS claimed that it was a news series.

Hearings regarding the legalities involved disclosure requests for eMails. Another matter was "from a lawyer complaining" that some of what was aired might affect his client, since the mini-series might "prejudice prospective jurors when his client goes on trial."
