= New Brooklyn Theatre =

Theatre company based in Brooklyn, NY

Coordinates: 40°40′51″N 73°57′10″W

New Brooklyn Theatre is a theatre company based in Brooklyn, NY that specializes in producing socially relevant work in New York City and internationally. It was founded in 2012 by Artistic Director Jonathan Solari, Jeff Strabone, and Sarah Wolff. The New York Times has called it "a flash point for the fusion of theatre and politics." It is now under the artistic leadership of Raja Feather Kelly.

== The Slave Theater ==
New Brooklyn Theatre was founded to restore the historic Slave Theater at 1215 Fulton Street in the Bedford-Stuyvesant neighborhood of Brooklyn. In August 2012, the group launched a Kickstarter campaign to raise $200,000 for a down payment on the building. Despite being one of the first crowdfunding campaigns to attempt to raise money to purchase a building, the group failed to reach its goal. The campaign drew praise and criticism from residents of the neighborhood.

As of February 2015, the group claims to still be in negotiations for the building with Fulton Halsey Development Corporation, a real estate development company that purchased the building in February 2013.

== Edward Albee's The Death of Bessie Smith ==
On January 9, 2014, the group produced its first full production, Edward Albee's The Death of Bessie Smith in Interfaith Medical Center, a Bed-Stuy hospital that was scheduled to close on the play's final performance. The playwright granted permission for the rarely produced play to be performed because of its social relevance. The production, which was directed by the company's Artistic Director Jonathan Solari, incorporated post-show conversations with City Council members, Public Advocate Letitia James, U.S. Rep. Hakeem Jeffries, New York state senators, state assembly members, and activist artists like Harry Belafonte. After two extended runs, elected officials and hospital staff have credited the production with keeping the hospital open.

== Other works ==
In June 2014, in response to the 2014 Elk River chemical spill, the group performed a new adaptation of Henrik Ibsen's An Enemy of the People on a custom built floating stage on the Elk River.

The group was invited by Harvard University to build a new Turkish production of Anton Chekhov's The Cherry Orchard in the Yedikule region of Istanbul.* This play aimed to draw attention to the destruction of historic gardens in the area.

Read Revive Reclaim, a reading series in Bed-Stuy, presented four forgotten plays by African-American playwrights and asked audiences to choose which play would the company would produce a full production of.

- The New Century, "Man in love" Christina Anderson.
