= John L. Phillips Jr. =

American judge and businessman (1920s-2008)

- Born: 1924 or 1925; Kansas, U.S.
- Died: February 16, 2008 (aged 83); Brooklyn, New York, U.S.
- Education: Wilberforce University
- Occupations: Judge; businessman

John L. Phillips Jr. (1924 or 1925 – February 16, 2008) was an American judge, businessman, and civil rights activist. He served as a New York City Civil Court Judge for the second Brooklyn district from 1977 to 1994, with the exception of a six-year period between the 1980s and 1990s. He owned the Slave Theater and Black Lady Theatre, as well as several properties in Bedford–Stuyvesant. After being legally judged mentally incompetent in an investigation observers said was politically motivated, his estate was heavily sold off by court-appointed guardians and he was living in poor conditions in assisted care during the final decade of his life.

== Biography ==
Phillips was born in 1924 or 1925 on a Kansas farm and fought during World War II. He got a law degree from Wilberforce University, and he was the first Black lawyer admitted to the Montana State Bar. In 1962, he became a practicing lawyer in New York state. His experience included arguing cases before the Supreme Court of the United States and United States Court of Appeals for the Armed Forces.

Phillips ran for the 2nd Brooklyn district in the 1976 New York City Civil Court elections, playing the song "Kung Fu Fighting" for his campaign. He received the endorsement of The New York Times. Running on a multi-party ticket, Phillips obtained a large lead in the race and won the election. He was defeated for re-election in 1986. After failing to win a return to his original seat in the 1991 New York City Civil Court elections, he was elected there in 1992. He retired as judge in 1994 and did not run for re-election during that year's election.

Philips wrote, directed, and produced an interracial romance film named Hands Across Two Continents, and when he couldn't convince theaters to screen it, bought the Regent Theater in Brooklyn to have the movie played. He renamed it the Slave Theater because, according to Suzanne Spellen of Brownstoner, he wanted to "remind everyone in the community, including himself, where they came from. He didn't particularly care that many in that community were offended by the name, either". In response to the Howard Beach racial attack, Phillips opened the theater as a space for the local Black community and the civil rights movement; Al Sharpton started holding weekly rallies at the theater, which he cites as a reason for increased civil rights organizing in Brooklyn at the time. Phillips also owned real-estate in his native Bedford–Stuyvesant, as well as a second theater, the Black Lady Theatre. At one point, he was worth $10 million.

During the 1986 New York State Assembly election, Phillips successfully supported primary challengers to Roger L. Green and Albert Vann – Stanley Frere and Robert A. Hunter, respectively – though both incumbents remained in the general election through the Liberal Party line. In the 1989 New York City mayoral election, he endorsed Rudy Giuliani instead of eventual winner David Dinkins, citing the former's experience with fighting crime. The decision was controversial at the time, with several Black politicians responding with outrage. He decided to run in the 1997 and 2001 Brooklyn County District Attorney elections as a challenger to Charles J. Hynes. However, he withdrew from the former after his April 1997 arrest on charges of possessing an unlicensed gun and resisting arrest, and in the latter's case he was legally judged mentally incompetent. He was not placed on the Democratic primary ballot in either election. Several observers found the judgment politically motivated, while Hynes (who ordered the investigation) maintained it was "undertaken for Mr. Phillips's own good".

Following the judgment, a court put Phillips' estate under guardianship, and he lost the vast majority of his properties in an auction, with the guardians receiving all the profits. He was also confined to East Haven Nursing and Rehabilitation Center, a "dingy Bronx nursing home that his lawyer Ezra Glaser described as a place where people go to die" before being allowed to move to Castle Senior Living in Park Slope. Abigail Ronck of The Brooklyn Ink said that friends of Phillips' reported that "his room reeked of urine and garbage bags full of his clothes covered the floor". One of his guardians was suspended from practicing law within New York state on charges of theft from his estate, and a later report from The Brooklyn Ink said that there was poor record-keeping and unpaid bills and taxes from the guardians. In 2008, Marc Ecko sent Phillips some furniture after hearing about Phillips' poor situation.

Phillips never married or had children, but had a companion Elizabeth Pickett. He was also a 10th dan black belt in kung fu, which he had studied back in Japan, and would often demonstrate martial arts during work, resulting him in earning the nickname "kung fu judge". He also owned a dojo where he taught a "Gorilla-Gnat System of Scientific Movements and Defensive Fighting" for local Black youth. He suffered from diabetes during his later life.

Phillips died on February 16, 2008, in New York Methodist Hospital, aged 83. At the time, The New York Times reported that he had collapsed in Castle Senior Living. However, his nephew sued Castle Senior Living over allegations that the rest home did not provide adequate care to Phillips and allowed unlicensed officials to preside over it. The home settled with Phillips' family for $750,000 in 2015.
