= Sandra Roper =

American civil rights lawyer

Sandra Elena Roper (born c. December 29, 1956) is an American civil rights lawyer, who had an unsuccessful candidacy for district attorney in Brooklyn, New York against former King's County district attorney Charles J. Haynes, in 2001 before making a successful run for judge in 2017. She is currently an active civil court judge in Kings County, New York. She has served in criminal court and civil court.
