= Yeshiva Torah Temimah =

Location
- Brooklyn, New York; United States; 40.635271°N 73.97217°W

Information
- Established: 1976
- Website: http://www.ytt.edu

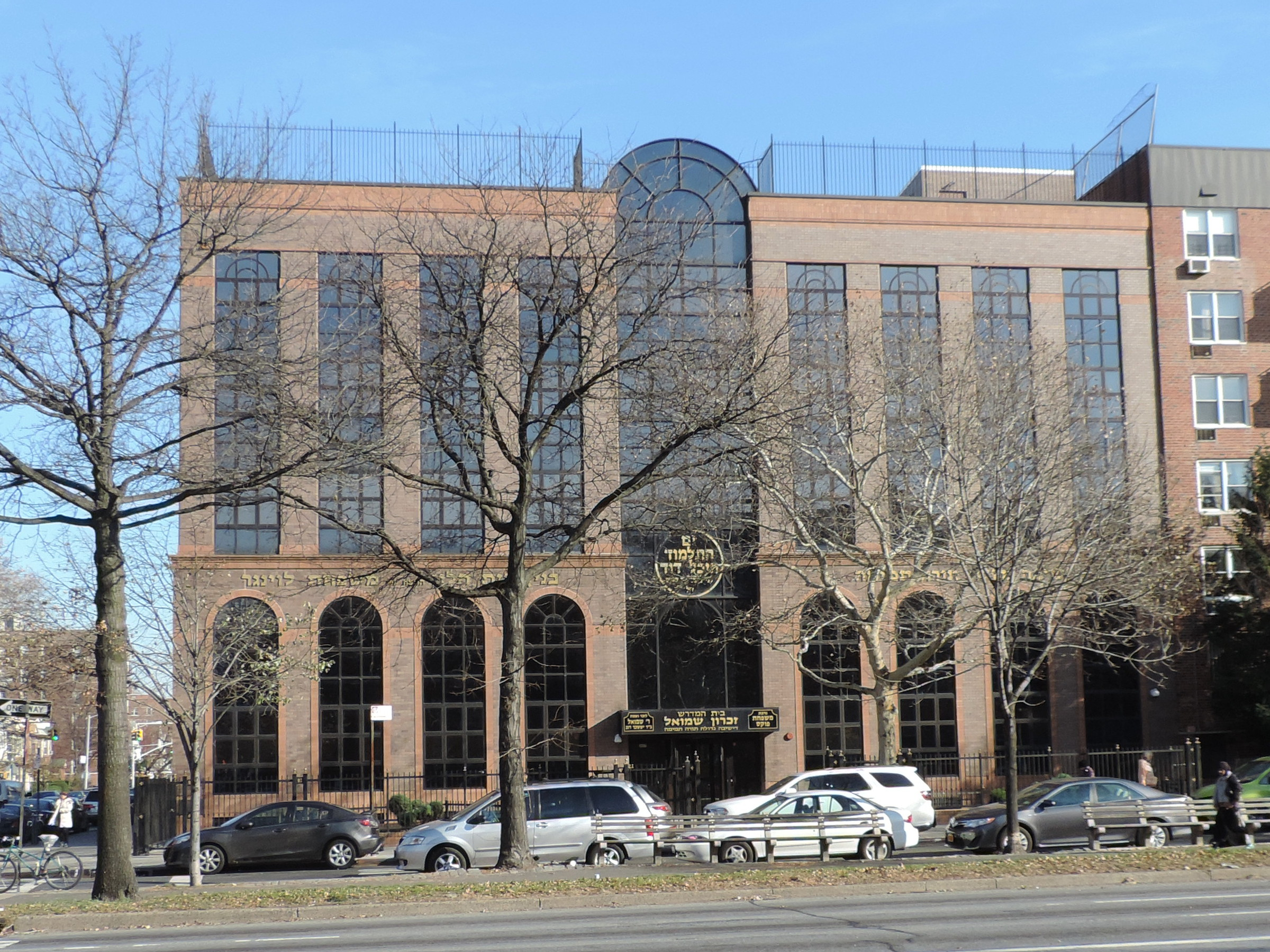
Yeshiva Torah Temima, 2014

Yeshiva Torah Temimah is an Orthodox yeshiva with branches in Brooklyn, New York and Lakewood, New Jersey.

== History ==
Yeshiva Torah Temimah was founded by Lipa Margolis as Yeshiva Torah Vodaath of Flatbush, and began operating under its current name in 1976. The yeshiva grew to social prominence between 1980 and 2000.

The yeshiva provides a combined religious and secular single-sex education to approximately 675 male students, including training in Talmud, musar literature, history, classical Jewish scholarship and literature, mathematics, language arts and science education.

In 2023, the yeshiva sold one of their Brooklyn buildings to Rabbi Zalman Teitelbaum’s satmar faction for an estimated $20 million.

== Enrollment ==
The New York branch of the yeshiva consists of two buildings. The location on Ocean Parkway in Flatbush, Brooklyn houses approximately 650 boys ranging in age from nursery school through the twelfth grade; the school previously maintained a separate building for tertiary study, with an additional enrollment of about 100 students, which has since moved to Staten Island, with current enrollment at approximately 25 students. It has a student-teacher ratio of approximately nineteen to one.

== Notable faculty ==
- Shlomo Feivel Shustal: He taught the highest level students of the Beis Medrash (study hall) until August 2014, when he left to open his own Talmudic seminary called Yeshiva Neos Yaakov.
- Betzalel Busel: He succeeded Shlomo Feivel Shustal and currently teaches the highest level students.
- Yaakov Landau (died 2022): He taught the 9th grade students for nearly three decades. He then founded and served as Rosh Yeshiva of Mesivta Tiferes Shmuel in Lakewood New Jersey, where he also was the Rabbi of K’hal Chanichei Hayeshivos.
- Mendel Margulius (died 2020): He was a son of the school's founder, Lipa. Initially, Mendel was appointed by his father to lead the younger campus in Brooklyn, while simultaneously delivering regular Torah lectures to the older students. Eventually, the junior Margulies was appointed to lead the Staten Island division.

== Alumni ==
Graduates of the school generally pursue further Talmudic education in such institutions as the Brisk yeshiva and Mir yeshiva in Jerusalem, as well as Beth Medrash Govoha in New Jersey, with a significant percentage of school alumni occupying rabbinic pulpits and positions of Jewish education. They also attend prestigious universities.

== Controversies ==
The yeshiva made headlines when one of its teachers and assistant principal, Joel (Yehuda) Kolko, was charged in 2006 with sexually abusing two first-graders and forcing an adult former student to touch him during a visit to the school. Six former students also filed suit against the yeshiva, alleging the school administrators knew about Kolko's molestation of students for decades, but sought to cover it up and intimidate students who spoke out. Kolko later pleaded guilty to two lesser counts of child endangerment and was sentenced to three years' probation, later left the school, and died in November 2020. The suit also alleged that school principal Lipa Margulies waged a "a campaign of intimidation, concealment and misrepresentations designed to prevent victims from filing lawsuits." Four of the lawsuits were dismissed for being filed beyond the then five year statute of limitations. In October, 2016 it was reported that the school had reached a $2.1 million settlement on the two remaining cases. In August, 2019 Baruch Sandhaus filed a lawsuit under the Child Victims Act (NYS Kings County Supreme Court Index #518057/2019) against Yeshiva Torah Temimah, Kolko and Yoel Falk, alleging that Kolko and Falk sexually abused him around 1980 with the knowledge of the yeshiva and Margulies. In December 2019, an additional lawsuit was filed under the Child Victims Act against the school and Margulies (NYS Kings County Supreme Court Index #526789/2019) by a "John Doe" plaintiff alleging that Kolko sexually abused him in 1994 while he was a student at the yeshiva.
