= Herem of Rabbenu Gershom =

Medieval Jewish ordinances banning polygyny and unilateral divorce

In Jewish law, the Herem of Rabbenu Gershom (Hebrew: חֵרֶם דְּרַבֵּנוּ גֵּרְשׁוֹם, ban of Rabbeinu Gershom; commonly abbreviated חדר"ג, ḤaDRaG) is a group of ordinances ascribed to Rabbeinu Gershom ben Judah of Mainz (c. 960–1028) and enforced by the sanction of ḥerem, or communal excommunication. The two best known forbid a married man to take a second wife, and forbid a husband to divorce his wife without her consent. A prohibition on reading another person's correspondence and a rule protecting Jews who had been forcibly baptised and had returned to Judaism are usually counted with them, and a longer list of communal and procedural ordinances circulated in medieval Ashkenaz under Gershom's name. The whole group is also called the takkanot of Rabbeinu Gershom, while the phrase "ban of Rabbeinu Gershom" is often used more narrowly of the prohibition of polygyny.

Because Talmudic law permitted a man to marry more than one wife and allowed him to divorce his wife against her will, the first two ordinances reversed settled rules of Jewish marriage law, and they are generally regarded as among the most consequential enactments in the history of Jewish family law. No text of the ordinances survives from Gershom's lifetime; the earliest datable references are roughly a century later, and scholars since the nineteenth century have disagreed over which of the rules he actually enacted, with the result that modern writers normally speak of ordinances "attributed to" him.

The ban was received as binding in Germany and northern France and, later, in Poland and the rest of Ashkenaz, but not in Spain, North Africa or most of the communities of the Islamic world, where Sephardi and Middle Eastern Jews restrained polygyny instead through clauses written into the marriage contract. A claim that the ban had been imposed only until the end of the fifth millennium of the Hebrew calendar (the year 1240 CE) was reported by Solomon ben Adret and entered the standard codes, but Ashkenazi authorities held that the prohibition had in any case become binding custom. Where it worked hardship, rabbinic courts developed a dispensation known as the heter meah rabbanim, a release approved by one hundred rabbis of three different countries.

In the modern period the ordinances have been both extended and contested. The Chief Rabbinate of Israel enacted in 1950 that no Jew in Israel, of whatever community, might marry a second wife without a permit signed by the chief rabbis; Israeli law made bigamy a criminal offence subject to such a rabbinical permit; and the rule against opening another's letters has been invoked in discussions of privacy, from the background to Israel's privacy legislation to contemporary debate about electronic communication.

== Background ==
=== Polygyny and divorce in earlier Jewish law ===
Classical rabbinic law permitted polygyny. The Babylonian Talmud records the ruling of Rava that "a man may marry several wives in addition to his first wife", subject only to his being able to support them all, although the same passage preserves the stricter opinion of Rabbi Ami, who held that a husband who took an additional wife must divorce the first and pay her marriage settlement. The permission was not used everywhere to the same degree: plural marriage appears to have been uncommon among the Jews of Christian Europe and more frequent in the lands of Islam, where it matched the surrounding legal culture.

Divorce was similarly asymmetrical. A bill of divorce took effect only if the husband gave it willingly, but it did not require the wife's agreement; as Maimonides summarised the rule, a man "divorces only of his own will", whereas a woman "may be divorced either with her consent or without it". The husband's unilateral power of divorce, derived from Deuteronomy 24:1, is the background against which the second of Gershom's ordinances was framed.

=== Rabbeinu Gershom and the Rhineland communities ===
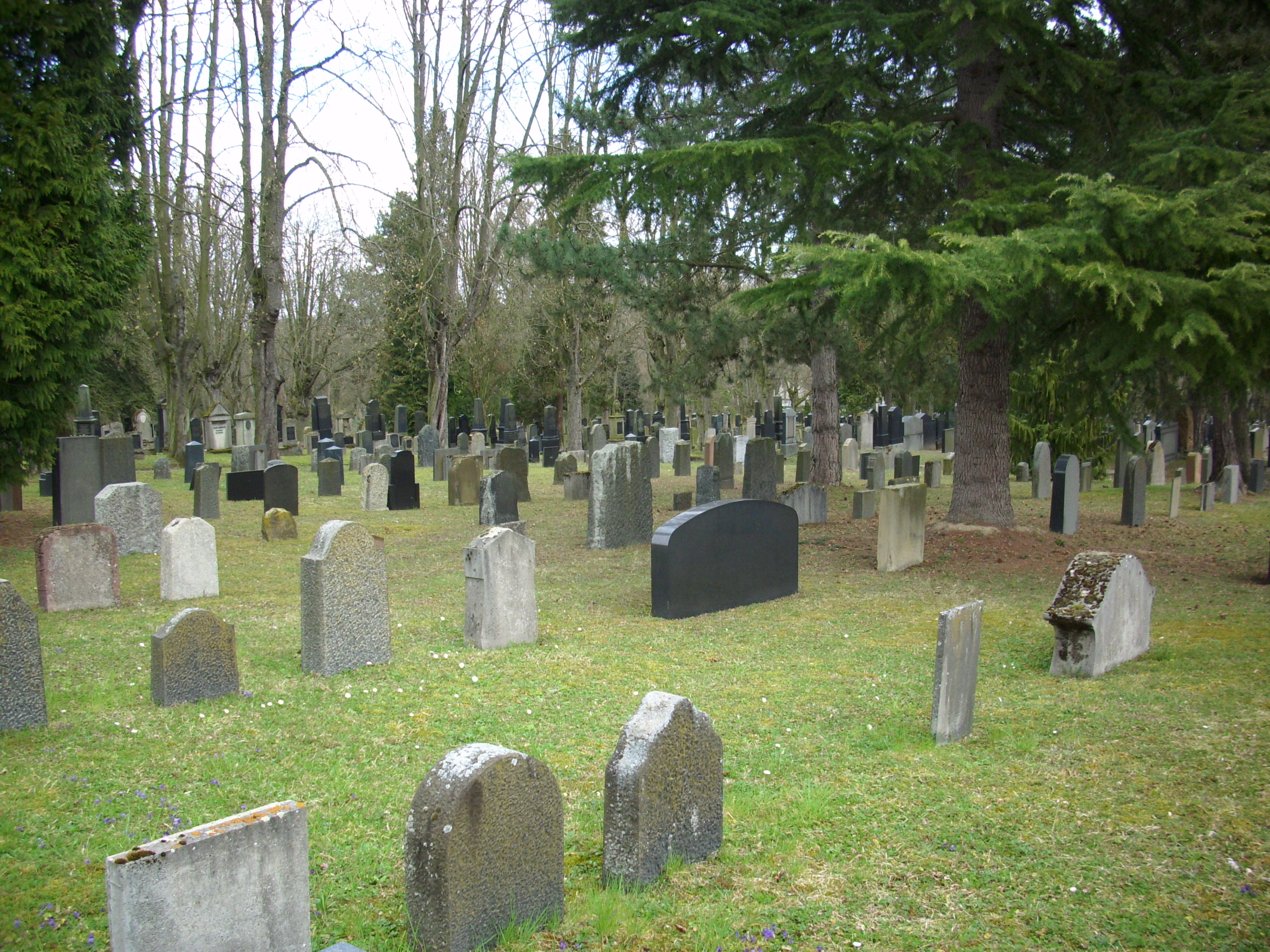
A Jewish cemetery in Mainz, the city in which Rabbeinu Gershom headed the leading Talmudic academy of the German lands. A memorial stone bearing his name was among the medieval gravestones recovered in the city.

Gershom ben Judah was born at Metz in about 960 and died at Mainz in 1028. He headed the academy at Mainz, the principal centre of Talmudic study in the German lands, and later generations knew him by the epithet Me'or ha-Golah ("Light of the Exile"); rabbinic scholars in western Europe after him regarded themselves as the students of his students. His authority rested less on any office than on the standing of his school, and it was exercised over a network of Rhineland communities that had begun in his lifetime to legislate for themselves through assemblies of their leaders.

Gershom's own life was touched by the pressures the ordinances address. His son abandoned Judaism at the time of the expulsion of the Jews from Mainz in 1012, and Gershom is reported to have observed the customary rites of mourning when he died a Christian.

== The ordinances ==
=== Prohibition of polygyny ===
The most widely known of the ordinances forbids a man to marry an additional wife while married to his first. It is cast as a ḥerem: the sanction for breach is exclusion from the community rather than invalidity of the marriage, and a second marriage contracted in defiance of the ban was treated as legally effective, so that it could be ended only by a bill of divorce. The prohibition is stated in the Shulḥan Arukh in a single clause, "Rabbeinu Gershom placed under ban one who marries a wife in addition to his wife", to which Moses Isserles appended a long gloss on its limits and its acceptance.

=== Divorce only with the wife's consent ===
The second ordinance forbids a husband to divorce his wife against her will. Asher ben Jehiel preserved a rationale for it: Gershom, he wrote, saw a generation that had grown unrestrained and was degrading Jewish women by the casual tossing of a bill of divorce, and therefore legislated "to equalise the power of the woman to the power of the man". Isserles records the rule together with its standard exception: a husband may not divorce his wife without her consent even if he is willing to pay her marriage settlement in full, "unless she has transgressed the religious law". Finkelstein notes a further procedural rule ascribed to Gershom for the Rhine communities, that no divorce was to be executed without the consent of the representatives of the communities.

The two matrimonial ordinances are closely linked. Avraham Grossman argues that the rule on divorce was framed to close the gap left by the rule on polygyny: without it, a merchant who wished to marry abroad could simply send a bill of divorce to the wife he had left behind in Germany. Susan Weiss observes that the protection was real but incomplete, since rabbinic courts retained means of overriding a wife's refusal.

=== Privacy of correspondence ===
A third ordinance forbids reading another person's letters without permission. Finkelstein observed that in a period without a public postal service letters travelled with private messengers and fellow travellers, so that the rule met a practical need, and that it was among the ordinances most frequently cited in later centuries in continental Europe. Ashkenazi correspondents came to write the abbreviation בחדר"ג, for "under the ban of Rabbeinu Gershom", on a sealed letter as a warning that it was not to be opened by anyone but the addressee.

=== Returning apostates ===
A fourth ordinance forbids taunting or reproaching a Jew who had been baptised and had subsequently returned to Judaism. Finkelstein notes that its protection extended beyond those converted by physical force to those who had been induced to leave the community by other means. This is the one ordinance whose attribution is generally regarded as secure, because Rashi cites it in Gershom's name.

=== Other ordinances ascribed to Gershom ===
Medieval sources ascribe to Gershom a considerably longer list. Rabbeinu Tam attributes to him a ruling against altering the text of the Talmud by conjectural emendation. Finkelstein groups a further set as a miniature constitution for the Rhineland communities: the local court's jurisdiction extends to Jews passing through and not only to residents; a plaintiff may halt the synagogue service to press a claim, but only after three public complaints; the owner of a synagogue may not exclude individual members while keeping it open to others; an individual may proclaim a ban requiring anyone who has found lost property to declare it; and an ordinance adopted by the majority of a community binds all its members. A rule protecting Jewish tenants against eviction is also counted among them.

== Transmission and attribution ==
=== The evidence ===
No text of the ordinances survives from Gershom's own time, and no scholar of his generation quotes them. Finkelstein noted that for the ban on polygyny "the text of the ordinance has not been preserved", and that there is no reference to it before the age of Rashi, almost a century after it was supposedly promulgated. The ascriptions that do survive are later: Meir of Rothenburg in the thirteenth century and a series of fifteenth-century authorities transmit lists of "the ordinances of Rabbeinu Gershom", and compilations such as the Kol Bo preserve them in varying versions.

The ordinances also circulated as part of the legal corpus of the Rhineland communities. In Rainer Barzen's critical edition of the ordinances of Speyer, Worms and Mainz, known as the Taqqanot Qehillot ShUM, the early Rhenish material falls into four groups: enactments authorised by the three communities themselves; ordinances attributed to Rabbeinu Gershom; an ordinance on levirate marriage by David of Münzenberg; and ordinances of Rabbeinu Tam. Grossman notes that the ordinances attributed to Gershom were in any event re-approved and accepted as binding at later assemblies of the sages of Ashkenaz, which is how they acquired their force for subsequent generations.

=== Modern scholarship ===
Scholars have divided over how much of the corpus is genuinely Gershom's. The Encyclopaedia Judaica summarises the sceptical case: no original texts survive, contemporaries are silent, the ascriptions surface only generations later, and some rules may have been credited to Gershom posthumously in order to lend his prestige to communal regulations of later date; on this view the ban on divorce without consent in particular, and several of the other ordinances, may not really be his. Against this, Finkelstein's study of the medieval synods treated the ordinances as the work of a genuine assembly convened by Gershom and as the foundation of a durable federation of communities.

A more recent proposal, set out in a working paper by the communications historian Menahem Blondheim, reads the corpus as a coherent body of rules governing communication across the diaspora (travel, hospitality, correspondence and the flow of information between autonomous communities) rather than as a miscellany of unrelated rules, and sees in it a response to the legal vacuum between self-governing communities at a time of increasing Jewish migration and commerce.

Modern reference works accordingly describe the rules as ordinances attributed to Gershom, while noting that the dispute over authorship has had no practical effect on their standing in Jewish law, which rests on their acceptance by the communities.

== Explanations ==
Historians have proposed several overlapping explanations for the two matrimonial ordinances.

The commonest is economic. Grossman points to the international trade of Rhineland Jews, who travelled to Provence, Spain, North Africa and other Muslim territories and might remain abroad for years; some of them took a second wife where they were living, in societies in which plural marriage was ordinary. The ban on polygyny, and its companion rule forbidding a husband to divorce his wife without her agreement, were on this reading directed at protecting the wives left at home. The Encyclopaedia Judaica sets the legislation against the same background of growing merchant wealth and economic stability in German Jewry.

A second explanation stresses the position of women in Ashkenazi society. Elisheva Baumgarten notes the prominence of Jewish women in the economy of medieval Germany (moneylending, trade, textile work and midwifery), where many ran businesses independently of their husbands, and treats the ordinances as part of a wider change in their legal standing. The rationale reported in Asher ben Jehiel's name, that the ordinance was made to equalise the power of the woman to that of the man, belongs to the same register, and the surrounding Christian environment, in which monogamy was the legal norm, is frequently adduced as a further factor.

Both explanations are qualified by the observation that the practice may have preceded the legislation. Grossman holds that monogamy was already accepted in Germany before the ordinance was issued, so that the ban confirmed and entrenched an existing pattern as much as it created one. Baumgarten likewise notes that it is unclear how common plural marriage among Ashkenazi Jews had been, although it became rarer still afterwards.

== Scope and limits ==
=== Geographical extent ===
The ban was received in Germany and northern France, and later throughout Ashkenaz, including Poland; it was not adopted in Spain, Egypt, the Land of Israel or most of the communities of the Islamic world. Renée Levine Melammed observes that only Ashkenazi Jewry accepted the ban, so that Iberian Jews remained free of it even though Spanish rabbis generally disfavoured plural marriage and never adopted a united position on it. The Encyclopaedia Judaica relates the pattern of acceptance to the surrounding legal order: in Christian countries the civil law itself prohibited plural marriage, whereas in Yemen, Iraq and North Africa it was permitted. Finkelstein notes that the ordinance nevertheless reached beyond Ashkenaz in one respect, since Spanish authorities found themselves obliged to enforce it upon German Jews who came within their jurisdiction.

=== The question of a time limit ===
Solomon ben Adret (Rashba, c. 1235–1310) reported that the ban had been imposed only until the end of the fifth millennium of the Hebrew calendar, that is until 1240 CE. The report entered the codes through Joseph Karo and appears in Isserles's gloss, which records the view that Gershom "placed under ban only until the end of the fifth millennium" while adding that in every place where the prohibition had been accepted it continued to bind as custom. Other authorities rejected the report outright. Solomon Luria held Ibn Adret's statement to be baseless and maintained that a ban, like any other, lasts in perpetuity unless it is revoked, which this one had not been; the Pitḥei Teshuvah later observed that rabbinic decrees are not as a rule time-limited and that leading authorities living at the opening of the sixth millennium said nothing of any expiry.

Historians have been equally sceptical of the report. Grossman notes that no corroborating testimony has been found in any Ashkenazi source, which leaves the tradition resting on Ibn Adret alone. Finkelstein dismissed it altogether, on the ground that Ibn Adret had built on hearsay reaching him from German scholars and that no evidence supported the claim. Whatever its origin, its practical consequence was limited in Ashkenaz, where the prohibition was treated as settled custom; it mattered more in the Ottoman lands, where, as Ruth Lamdan notes, Karo and his colleagues could treat the ban as long lapsed.

=== Exceptions and the dispensation of a hundred rabbis ===
Both matrimonial ordinances admit exceptions, discussed at length in the codes and the responsa literature. Isserles records that some authorities permit a second marriage where a religious obligation would otherwise go unfulfilled, the leading case being a couple married ten years without children, while others hold that the ban applies even then, and even in the case of levirate marriage, for which they require halizah instead. He treats the case for leniency as stronger where the first marriage cannot be dissolved at all: where the wife has become mentally incapable of receiving a bill of divorce, or where the husband is entitled in law to divorce her but she refuses to accept it. Baumgarten notes that the exception for a childless marriage of ten years' standing was narrowed after the twelfth century, so that a husband who sought to remarry was expected first to divorce his wife.

Where a dispensation was granted it took the form of the heter meah rabbanim: a release approved by a rabbinical court and endorsed by at least one hundred rabbis drawn from three different countries or districts. The dispensation does not dissolve the first marriage; it permits an additional one. The grounds recognised in the Encyclopaedia Judaica are a wife rendered incapable of married life by mental illness; a wife who refuses to accept a divorce that the court has ordered, particularly following adultery; and a marriage that has remained childless for more than ten years where the wife refuses a divorce, so that the husband cannot fulfil the obligation to procreate.

Elimelech Westreich has shown that the relation between the two ordinances was itself a live question. Surveying sixteenth- and seventeenth-century Polish authorities, he found that where a wife had behaved improperly the ban on polygyny might be waived, but that in cases of barrenness, insanity or desertion through no fault of hers it was firmly maintained; the general preference, he concludes, was to waive the enactment forbidding a man to divorce his wife against her will rather than the enactment prohibiting polygamy.

== Later reception ==
=== Ashkenaz and Poland ===
In Ashkenaz the ordinances passed from communal legislation into the standard legal literature. They were confirmed at the assemblies of the Rhineland communities, whose ordinances were in turn accepted by all the Jewish communities of France and Germany and later by those of Poland and eastern Europe. Their definitive codified form is Isserles's gloss on the Shulḥan Arukh, which set out both the prohibition and its exceptions for Ashkenazi practice. Westreich traces the working out of the resulting problems in Polish rabbinic thought, where two sixteenth-century tendencies, one restrictive and one more open to alternative Jewish legal traditions, were brought together in the early seventeenth century by Joel Sirkis.

=== Sephardi and Middle Eastern communities ===
Communities that did not receive the ban restrained plural marriage by contract instead. Lamdan notes that in Spain and Germany a clause was inserted in the marriage contract by which the husband undertook on oath not to take another wife except to fulfil the obligation to have children, but that in the Ottoman lands such a clause was optional and not regarded as the custom of the country, which left women there less protected; she records that seventeen per cent of divorce claims brought by women in the Levant rested on the husband's taking a second wife. Melammed describes the same device in medieval Spain, where a monogamy clause barred the husband from taking a second wife or a maidservant over his wife's objection, with divorce and payment of her settlement as the sanction, enforced by the threat of communal ostracism.

The Encyclopaedia Judaica notes that rabbinic courts in these communities tended to permit a second marriage only in circumstances that would have justified a dispensation under the ban itself, on the presumption that this was what the parties had understood the clause to mean. Lamdan records the opposite pressure as well: sixteenth-century authorities in the Levant, Karo among them, could set such clauses aside by finding technical defects in their wording.

== Modern era ==
In most of the countries where Jews have lived since the nineteenth century the question has been largely academic, because the civil law itself prohibits plural marriage; the Encyclopaedia Judaica contrasts Europe, the Americas and Australia in this respect with Yemen, Iraq and North Africa, where it was permitted. The ordinances have nonetheless remained legally live in two settings: the marriage law of the State of Israel, and the modern law of privacy.

=== State of Israel ===
The Chief Rabbinate of Israel enacted ordinances in 1950, under the chief rabbis Isaac Herzog and Ben-Zion Meir Hai Uziel, designed to create a single standard of marriage law for all Jewish communities in the country. Among other matters they provided that a Jew in Israel was not to marry a second wife without a marriage permit signed by the chief rabbis, a rule that in substance extended the Ashkenazi prohibition to communities that had never received it. The Encyclopaedia Judaica notes that the ordinance did not make a second marriage invalid; such a marriage could still be ended only by a bill of divorce.

Israeli statute law followed the same structure. The Penal Law Amendment (Bigamy) Law, 5719–1959 made bigamy an offence punishable by imprisonment, with a defence where a rabbinical court had granted a final permit approved by both chief rabbis; the provisions were carried without change into the Penal Law, 5737–1977, where the permit provision became section 179. In 1980 the requirement of approval by both chief rabbis was replaced by approval by the president of the Rabbinical Court of Appeals. The Encyclopaedia Judaica further records that the Supreme Court of Israel at first confined such permits to cases in which a bill of divorce could not objectively be delivered, in the Street decision of 1963, but that in Boronovsky in 1969 it held that rabbinical courts might grant a release on any halakhically based ground.

Amihai Radzyner has examined the disagreement between the chief rabbis over the 1980 change. Shlomo Goren wanted both chief rabbis to remain a substantive check and objected in particular to permits for men who intended to live with two wives at once, relying on ethical and social considerations as well as halakhic ones; Ovadia Yosef held that the chief rabbis' role was a formal confirmation of decisions the rabbinical courts had already weighed, argued that the requirement burdened childless applicants, and, once he became president of the Rabbinical Court of Appeals, signed the files that had accumulated. The two also differed over whose tradition applied: Yosef insisted that Sephardi Jews had never accepted the ban and objected to what he saw as the imposition of Ashkenazi norms, a characterisation Westreich has echoed in describing Goren's position as an extreme Ashkenazi one.

Permits remain unusual but are not unknown. Israeli media reported in 2018 that a rabbinical court had allowed a man to marry a second wife after his wife refused to accept a divorce, and that of the several dozen such applications made each year only a handful are granted. In a study of the case law Radzyner found that where a wife refuses a divorce the Israeli rabbinical courts almost always prefer to permit the husband a second marriage rather than coerce her, and offered halakhic, legal, ethical and practical explanations for the preference.

=== Divorce, consent and the agunah debate ===
The requirement of the wife's consent has a contested place in modern discussion of Jewish divorce refusal. Weiss describes it as a protection against the husband's unilateral power that proved incomplete, because the courts retained the means, among them the dispensation of a hundred rabbis, to override a wife's refusal or to allow the husband to remarry without her. Radzyner's finding that Israeli courts prefer the dispensation to coercion illustrates the same asymmetry from the other direction.

=== Privacy of correspondence ===
The rule against reading another's letters has proved the most portable of the ordinances. Introducing a collection on Jewish law and contemporary legal problems published three years after Israel enacted its Protection of Privacy Law of 1981, the Israeli justice minister Moshe Nissim cited it as evidence that Jewish sources had protected privacy long before modern legislation, noting that Gershom had prescribed excommunication for opening another's letter without permission and that in the Middle Ages such a penalty was a grave matter.

In a study of Jewish law as a resource for data-privacy regulation, Kenneth Bamberger and Ariel Evan Mayse treat Gershom's ruling as one of three foundational Jewish privacy doctrines, and note that later authorities extended it from the opening of another person's mail to the gathering of information from personal communications of every kind. They argue more broadly that Jewish law frames privacy as a communal obligation enforced by categorical rules of conduct rather than as an individual right exercised through consent, and that this offers a usable alternative model for an age of large-scale data collection.

== Assessment ==
Reference works treat the two matrimonial ordinances as a decisive change in Jewish family law, an instance in which communal legislation reversed rules of the Talmud itself, while stressing the limits of their reach, since they were not received in several large centres of Jewish life until comparatively recent times. The Encyclopaedia Judaica observes that Gershom's ordinances marked a break with German Jewry's dependence on the authority of Babylonia, and that although modern scholars question whether all of them were his, their historical significance is not in doubt. Finkelstein regarded the ban on polygyny as the ordinance that won the widest acceptance of any medieval Jewish enactment.

== See also ==
- Polygamy in Judaism
