= Sibling-in-law =

Spouse's sibling or sibling's spouse

Example of the spouse of one's sibling

Saul	Kasey
Jonathan	Mary Anne	David

David and Jonathan became brothers-in-law when David married Jonathan's sister Mary Anne

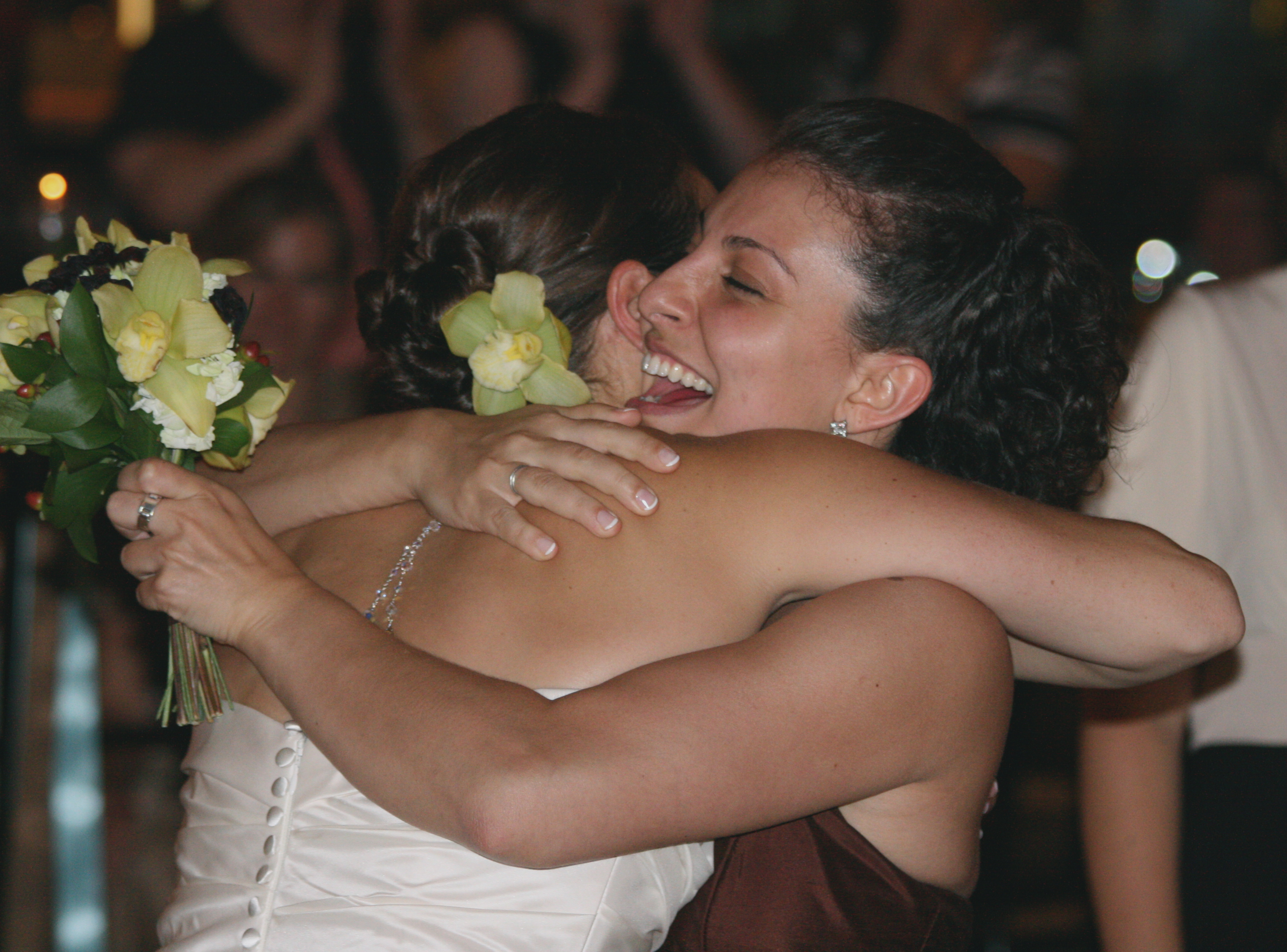
Sibling-in-laws are referred as brother-in-law or sister-in-law based on the gender of the relative

A sibling-in-law is the spouse of one's sibling, the sibling of one's spouse, or the spouse of one's spouse's sibling. In Indian English the latter can be referred to as a co-sibling (specifically a co-sister, for the wife of one's sibling-in-law, or co-brother, for the husband of one's sibling-in-law).

More commonly, a sibling-in-law is referred to as a brother-in-law for a male sibling-in-law and a sister-in-law for a female sibling-in-law.

== Relationships ==
Siblings-in-law are related by a type of kinship called affinity like all in-law relationships. All of these are relations which do not relate to the person directly by blood.

Just like the children of one's siblings, the children of one's siblings-in-law are called simply nieces and nephews – if necessary, specified whether "by marriage", as opposed to "by blood" or "by adoption".

If one pair of siblings is married to another pair of siblings, the siblings-in-law are thus doubly related, each of the four both through one's spouse and through one's sibling, while the children of the two couples are double cousins.

== Culture ==
One study, examining the issue of envy in the triadic system of sibling, sibling-in-law and spouse, concluded that "The sibling-in-law relationship shared similarities with both spousal and sibling relationships" and that "Relational closeness and satisfaction for all relationships in the triad were correlated."

In Islamic law (Sharia) and Jewish law (halakha), sexual relations between siblings-in-law are prohibited as incestuous, unless the spouse is no longer married. Conversely, in Judaism there was the custom of yibbum, whereby a man had a non-obligatory duty to wed his deceased brother's childless widow, so she might have progeny by him.

== See also ==
- Nephew and niece
- Cousins-in-law
- Affinity (law)
