= Levy Synagogue of Worms =

Coordinates: 49.6341194°N 8.3664503°E

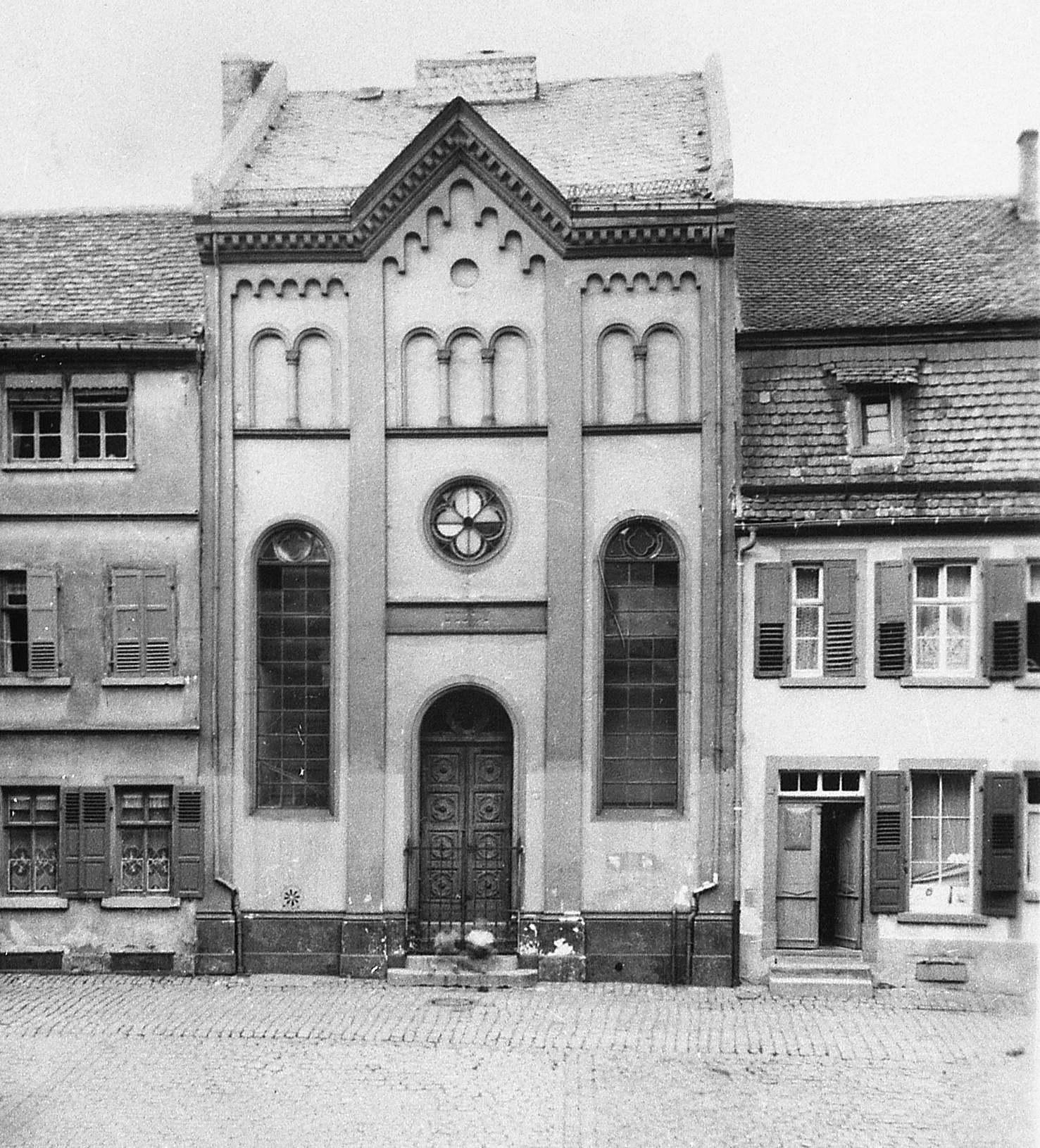
View of the Levy Synagogue from Judengasse

Levy Synagogue (German: Levy’sche Synagoge) was a synagogue of the Jewish community of Worms, consecrated in 1875 and named after its benefactor, Leopold Levy. It emerged from tensions between conservative and progressive factions within the community.

== Background ==
From 1824 to 1864, the conservative Rabbi Jakob (Koppel) Bamberger served the Jewish community of Worms. However, a progressive faction was influential within the community. They succeeded in hiring a religious teacher and renovating the old synagogue in the 1840s. These renovations included removing the partition between the men's and women's sections and replacing the Gothic bimah with an open platform. Over time, a balance was maintained between the conservative and progressive elements, the latter seeking greater integration into the Christian-influenced environment.

After Rabbi Bamberger's departure, the progressive faction consolidated power, appointing liberal rabbis such as Dr. Markus Jastrow (1864–1866) and Dr. Alexander Stein (1867–1910). In 1877, Dr. Stein introduced reformed services featuring an organ. In response, the conservative wing of the community commissioned the construction of a separate synagogue.

== Building ==
=== Location ===
The building was constructed at 29 Judengasse, on the northern side of the street, directly across from the main entrance to the now "Old Synagogue". Leopold Levy, a merchant and banker who owned a grain warehouse on the site, donated both the land and the construction of the synagogue.

=== Architecture ===
Construction began in 1870/71. The structure was seamlessly integrated into the existing row of buildings and built in the Neo-Romanesque style. Architectural plans initially designed for the Old Synagogue in the 1860s were adapted for this project. The facades of the front and rear were nearly identical, providing access both from Judengasse and from the Graben side—breaking with tradition by opening a synagogue entrance outside of Judengasse.

The facades were structured into three vertical sections framed by pilasters. The central field featured a modest portal topped by a rose window. Inside, the building's substantial height accommodated a gallery running along the perimeter. An organ was deliberately omitted. Whether to use an organ was one of the central points of contention between conservatives and progressives. Overall, the interior emphasized strict simplicity.

== History ==
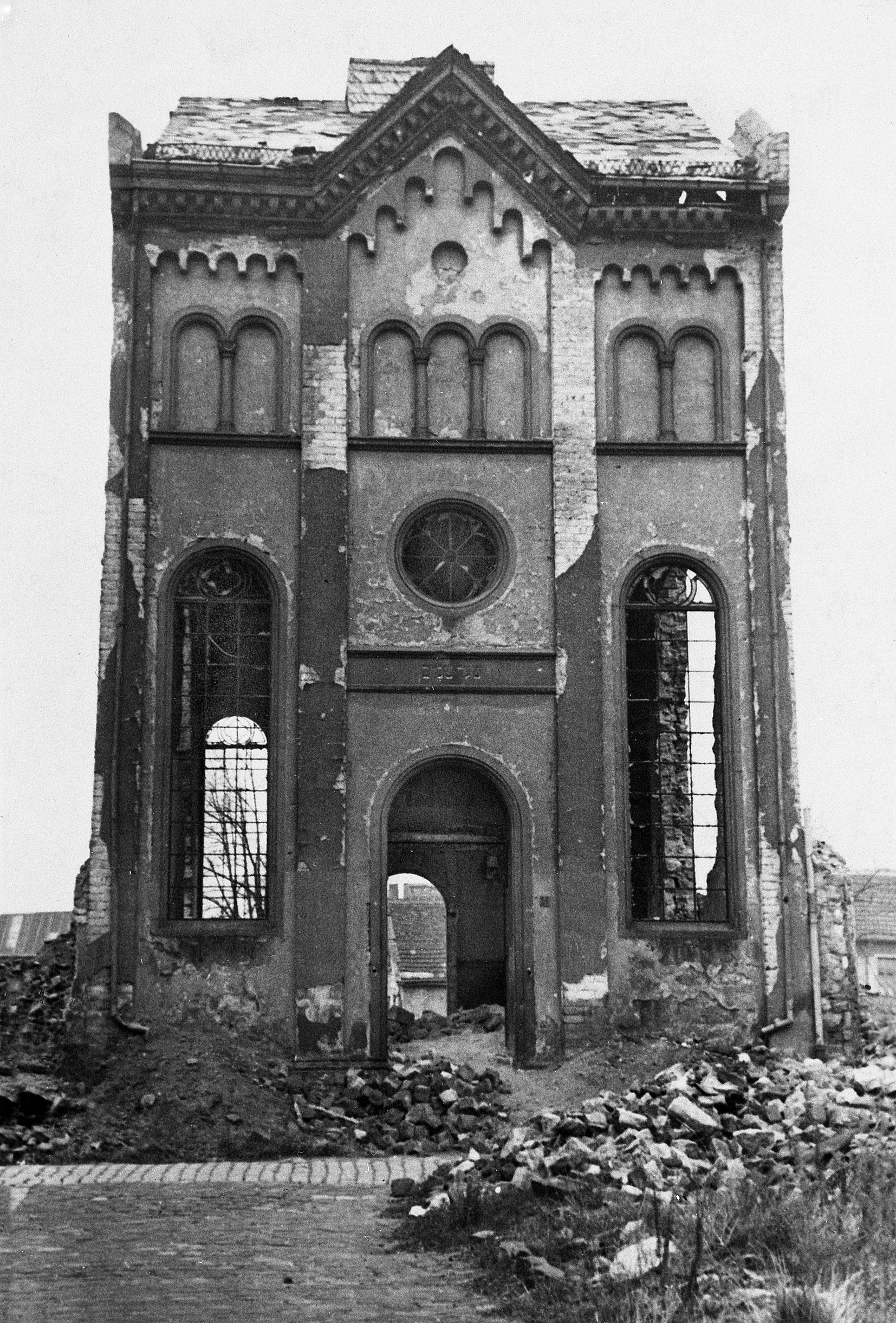
Ruins of the Levy Synagogue after the World War II.

Although the Levy Synagogue was an independent building, it did not establish a separate community. Instead, it functioned as a secondary place of worship for the conservative faction:

Should there ever be a division within the Jewish community of Worms, the main community—which retains ownership of the communal properties—shall remain the owner of the synagogue. The separate congregation shall never own it. This gift is intended to promote unity within the community, not division.

— Leopold Levy, Clause 5 of the 1875 notarial deed gifting the synagogue to the Israelite Religious Community of Worms

In practice, the Levy Synagogue was used for weekday services, replacing the inadequate Claus Synagogue, which had originally been the private synagogue of the Sinsheimer family. Over time, it served various religious currents within the community. Meanwhile, a group of Polish Orthodox Jews maintained a separate prayer space at house "Zur Kante", Judengasse 18.

Gedenktafel, Judengasse 29

Gedenktafel, Old Synagogue

During the November Pogrom of 1938, the synagogue was vandalized but not set on fire, unlike the Old Synagogue. Since the building was embedded in a row of houses, arson would have endangered neighboring structures. On 21 February 1945, it was damaged during an air raid. After the Holocaust, with no remaining Jewish community in Worms, reconstruction efforts focused on the medieval Old Synagogue. As buildings from the historicist period were then undervalued, the ruins—still standing up to the gable—were demolished in 1947. In a letter dated January 9, 1947, to the French military government, city archivist and preservationist Friedrich Maria Illert wrote: "The New Synagogue is a modern structure from the late 19th century in Romanesque style... It holds no architectural significance. Restoration is not planned".

Today, the site is occupied by a residential building. Two memorial plaques, donated in 1990, commemorate the Levy Synagogue and the Levy family.

== See also ==
- Worms Synagogue

== Literature ==
- Gerold Bönnen: Anmerkungen zum politischen, wirtschaftlichen und sozialen Aufstiegs- und Akkulturationsprozess der Wormser Juden (1816 bis 1865). In: Der Wormsgau 32 (2016), pp. 169–248.
- Francis Leopold Levy: Mein Elternhaus. In: Der Wormsgau 16 (1992/1995), S. 105–112.
- Fritz Reuter: Leopold Levy und seine Synagoge von 1875. Ein Beitrag zu Geschichte und Selbstverständnis der Wormser Juden im 19. Jahrhundert. In: Der Wormsgau 11 (1974/1975), pp. 58–68.
- Fritz Reuter: Warmaisa: 1000 Jahre Juden in Worms. 3. Auflage. Eigenverlag, Worms 2009. ISBN 978-3-8391-0201-5
- Fritz Reuter: Warmaisa – das jüdische Worms. Von den Anfängen bis zum jüdischen Museum des Isidor Kiefer (1924). In: Gerold Bönnen: Geschichte der Stadt Worms. 2. Auflage. Theiss, Darmstadt 2015, pp. 664-690. ISBN 978-3-8062-3158-8
