= Rashi Gate =

Gateway in Worms, Germany

Coordinates: 49.634309°N 8.367996°E

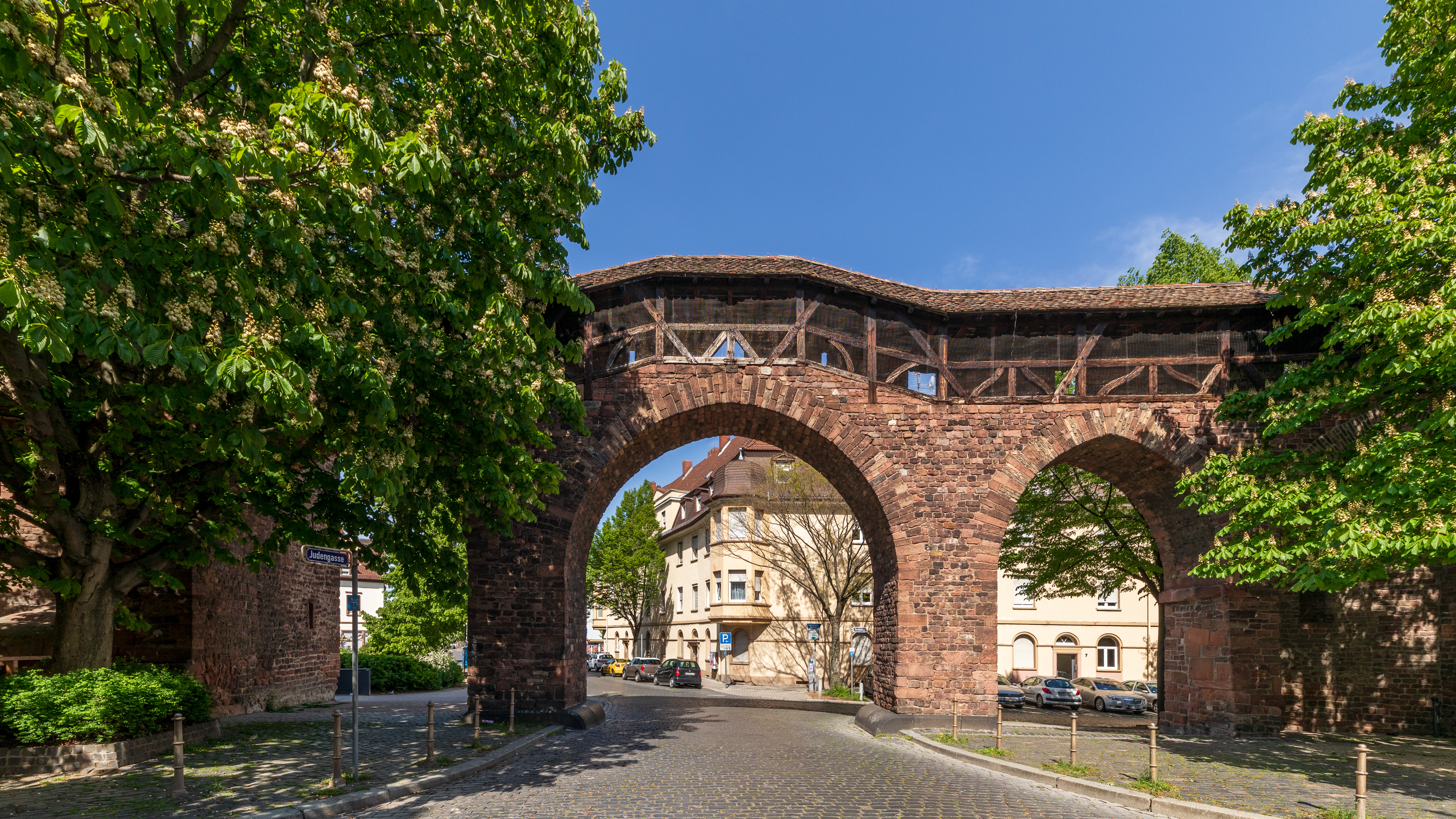
The Rashi Gate in the city fortifications of Worms

The Rashi Gate (German: Raschitor) is an arched gateway consisting of three arches, built in the early 20th century as a breach in the inner city wall of Worms, Germany.

== Construction ==
The architect and city building officer Georg Metzler designed the plans for the breach in order to improve connections between the outer districts and the city center. The breach through the medieval city wall was made in 1907/08. At the same time, the adjoining remaining parts of the wall were renovated.

Alongside the Rashi Gate in the north, the Andreastor in the south and the opening for Herzogenstraße in the eastern wall were also constructed to meet the demands of modern traffic.

Today, the Rashi Gate is designated a cultural monument under the monument protection laws of Rhineland-Palatinate.

== Name ==
Due to its proximity to the Judengasse and the nearby synagogue, the gateway was named after the Jewish scholar Rashi.

== Literature ==
- Irene Spille et al.: Stadt Worms = Denkmaltopographie Bundesrepublik Deutschland. Kulturdenkmäler Rheinland-Pfalz. Volume 10. Wernersche Verlagsgesellschaft, Worms 1992, ISBN 3-88462-084-3, pp. 40ff.
