= Loving Leah =

2009 American television film

- Promotional poster
- Genre: Romantic drama
- Based on: Loving Leah by P'nenah Goldstein
- Teleplay by: P'nenah Goldstein
- Directed by: Jeff Bleckner
- Starring: Lauren Ambrose; Adam Kaufman; Susie Essman; Ricki Lake; Mercedes Ruehl
- Music by: Jeff Beal
- Country of origin: United States
- Original language: English

Production
- Executive producers: Brent Shields; Michael Besman
- Cinematography: Charles Minsky
- Editor: Geoffrey Rowland
- Running time: 98 minutes
- Production company: Hallmark Hall of Fame

Original release
- Network: CBS
- Release: January 25, 2009

Loving Leah is a 2009 American romantic drama television film that aired on CBS as a Hallmark Hall of Fame movie on January 25, 2009. The film is directed by Jeff Bleckner and stars Adam Kaufman as a non-observant Jewish bachelor who feels compelled to marry his rabbi brother's widow, Leah (Lauren Ambrose), to honor him via the ancient Jewish law of yibbum (levirate marriage).

Loving Leah began as a play by P'nenah Goldstein and was brought to Hallmark by Ricki Lake, who appears in a minor role in the film. Goldstein also wrote the screenplay and "saw it in a way like Moonstruck or Crossing Delancey." To prepare for her role, lead actress Lauren Ambrose spent time with women of the close-knit Hasidic community.

== Plot ==
Jake Lever is a successful cardiologist living in the upscale Georgetown neighborhood of Washington, D.C. When he dozes off at the hospital where he works, he dreams that his brother, Benjamin, tells him they are okay. Jake is confused and baffled after receiving a phone call from his mother later that day informing him that his brother, an ultra-Orthodox Jewish rabbi, has died suddenly. He feels guilty for not having kept in touch with Ben for several years. After Ben's funeral in Brooklyn, Jake learns that because his brother's wife Leah was left without children, they must perform a halizah ritual to release them from the religious obligation to conduct a levirate marriage.

Jake and Leah agree, but Jake changes his mind after seeing Leah wears a necklace with the identical hamsa his brother gave him before Benjamin left for college. The amulet reminds Jake of how much he loved his brother. He pulls Leah aside and says he doesn't want to deny his brother's existence, which is what he believes the halizah vow requires of him. After deciding she wants to leave her mother's home, become independent and start college, Leah agrees to Jake's alternate offer to marry him and move with him to Washington but maintain a platonic relationship. Jake is constantly busy with work at the hospital; his girlfriend Carol has little patience for his new "wife", and Leah adjusts to finding her way around a new city. As Leah becomes more liberal in her religious outlook, Jake finds himself drawn back to his Jewish roots. Eventually, true love grows and the two find the greatest gift Benjamin left them is each other.

== Cast ==
- Lauren Ambrose as Leah Lever
- Adam Kaufman as Jake Lever
  - Timothée Chalamet as Young Jake
- Susie Essman as Malka
- Ricki Lake as Rabbi Gerry
- Christy Pusz as Carol
- Mercedes Ruehl as Janice Lever
- Harris Yulin as Rabbi Belsky
- Natasha Lyonne as Esther

== Production ==
Filming took place in Brooklyn and Washington, D.C.

== See also ==
- Hasidic Judaism
