= Heter meah rabbanim =

Jewish legal term permitting remarriage

Heter meah rabbanim (Hebrew: היתר מאה רבנים, lit. 'permission by one hundred rabbis') is a term in Jewish law which means that one hundred Rabbis agree with a beth din (rabbinical court) that a particular situation warrants an exemption to permit a man to remarry even though his wife refuses or is unable to accept a get (a legal divorce according to Jewish law). This solution is available for the man to remarry because according to Torah law, a man may be married to more than one woman, and even with the Heter, he is still considered married to the first woman. However, since a woman cannot be married to two men and must receive a bill of divorce according to Torah law in order to be considered single, there is no Heter to receive permission from 100 rabbis to remarry without a divorce.

In about 1000 CE the Ashkenazic halachic authority Rabbeinu Gershom of Mainz is said to have issued four decrees through his court. His bans included a decree prohibiting polygamy, and a decree prohibiting a man from divorcing a woman without her consent. Three centuries later Asher ben Jehiel explained why Rabbeinu Gershom issued his ban: "Because he saw the generations unbounded and 'throwing the divorce' so he decreed to equate the powers of the woman to the powers of the man."

Even though Rabbeinu Gershom, the leading authority of the age, decreed that a man was not allowed to divorce a woman against her will, the force of his decree was mitigated by later authorities who allowed for an exemption in certain extreme cases, in which they granted permission for a man to marry another woman if he received permission from 100 rabbis (meah rabbanim). Examples of cases where 100 rabbis allowed for a man to marry a second wife include the case of a man whose wife went missing, or refused to accept a get for an extended period. In such cases as these, the beth din will permit him to remarry only after one hundred rabbis agree with them to issue an exemption.

To ensure that a particular situation justifies an exemption, the rabbis instituted a requirement, that at least one hundred Torah scholars domiciled in at least three countries or, according to some authorities, three jurisdictions, certify that dispensation for a second marriage is justified.

In order to get a heter meah rabbanim, it used to be that a man who got the go ahead from a rabbinic court wandered from town to town and from one country to another with a letter from a beth din and had to plead his case with every town rabbi to get his approval. Later on, written permission by mail was accepted and sometimes an intermediary was used to plead his case. In the last century with the ease of communication, it has become a more formal process in which the beth din takes the lead and secures the one hundred signatures required.

Situations where the beth din might see a justification which warrants this process include:

- Where halacha (Jewish religious law) requires a man to divorce his wife and she refuses to accept it (e.g., some situations of adultery).
- Where the wife has abandoned her husband and steadfastly refuses to accept a get.
- Where the wife disappeared and her whereabouts are unknown.
- Where the wife is mentally unable to give consent to receiving a get.
- Where the wife has fallen into an irreversible coma due to illness or injury.

In the last two of these cases, the beth din will, as a condition of the heter, demand a binding undertaking from the husband that he will continue to provide for his wife's care.

The heter meah rabbanim is a source of controversy for religious Jews today. In 2014, The New York Times reported on one man, Meir Kin, who refused to divorce his first wife but then married another. In 2019 the media reported that the Chief Rabbi of Israel delayed the funeral of Meir Kin's mother, until he agreed to divorce his first wife.

== Sephardic Jews ==
Ashkenazic Jews have followed Rabbeinu Gershom's ban since the beginning of the 11th century. Some Sephardi and Mizrachi (Oriental) Jews (particularly those from Yemen and Iran, where polygamy is a social norm) discontinued polygamy much more recently as they emigrated to countries where it was forbidden. The State of Israel has forbidden polygamous marriages and adheres to the ban, but instituted provisions for existing polygamous families immigrating from countries where the practice was legal.
