= Yibbum =

Levirate marriage

Yibbum (pronounced [jibum], Hebrew: ייבום) is the form of levirate marriage found in Judaism. As specified by Deuteronomy 25:5–10, the brother of a man who died without children is permitted and encouraged to marry the widow. However, if either of the parties refuses to go through with the marriage, both are required to go through a ceremony known as halizah, involving a symbolic act of renunciation of their right to perform this marriage.

Jewish law (halakha) has seen a gradual decline of yibbum in favor of halizah, to the point where in most contemporary Jewish communities, and in Israel by mandate of the Chief Rabbinate, yibbum is prohibited.

== In the Hebrew Bible ==
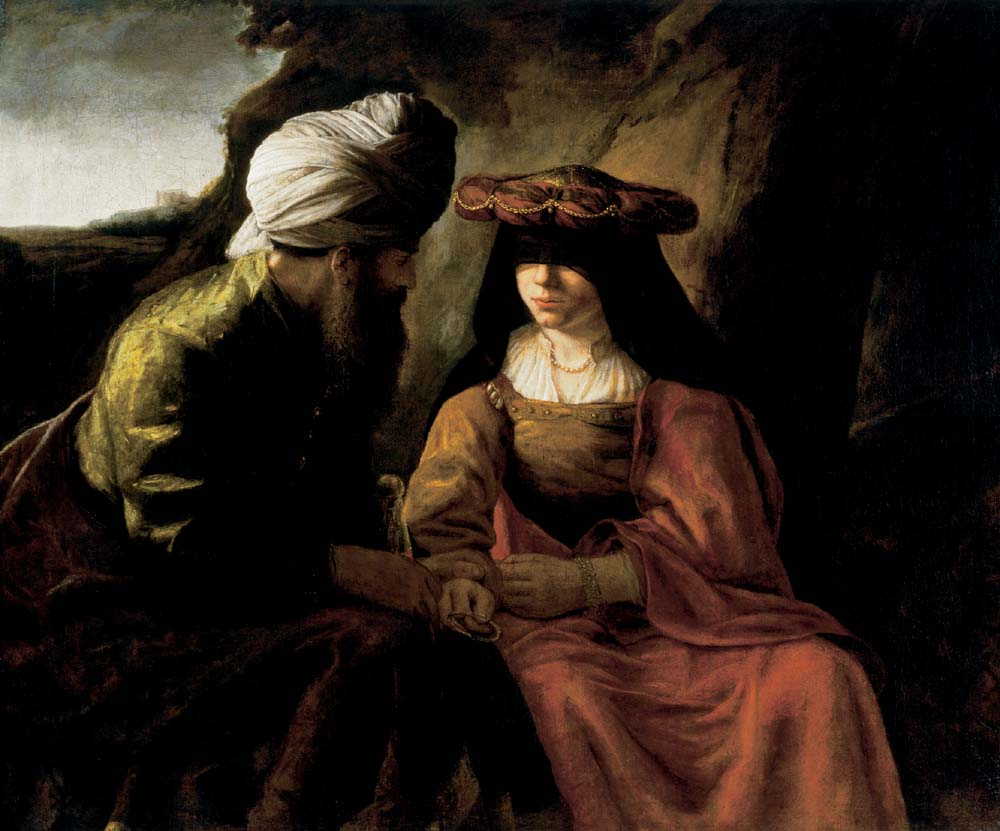
Judah and Tamar, by school of Rembrandt (1650s). An early example of a levirate-type practice is the biblical story of Judah and Tamar

The Torah prohibits sexual relations by a man with his brother's wife, but yibbum is an exception to this rule. The surviving brother is given a choice to take his responsibility as a goel by fulfilling the yibbum obligation, or to perform halizah, though the latter choice is described by the verse disfavorably. The brother who agreed to marry his sister-in-law would be the sole benefactor of his brother's estate instead of splitting it with the family. The offspring of the levirate union would be seen as a perpetuation of the deceased brother's name. Yibbum is permissible only when the dead brother had no children at all.

Although the stated intent of the levirate law as expressed in Deuteronomy is to provide an heir so that the deceased brother's name "will not be obliterated from Israel" (Deuteronomy 25:6), such laws effectively provided protection for widows as well. At the time the Torah was written, if a woman did not have a husband because of widowhood, she had no one to provide for her any longer and she would be disgraced, if not likely die of starvation. Children were also a means of continued provision, since they are commanded to care and show respect for the elderly as they move further along in years. A childless widow was without both means of provision. Although quite contrary to modern day sensibilities, even becoming a second wife to a brother-in-law, as indicated in Deuteronomy 25:5-10, was better than living on the streets at the mercy of those around her. Under Torah, men had a responsibility to the women around them, which included life-sustaining provisions (i.e. food, shelter, and comfort). Those of honor were beholden to their responsibility to protect the defenseless.

Yibbum had significant economic implications for the parties involved: the first child born to the brother's widow would be deemed the heir of the deceased brother, and able to claim the deceased brother's share of inheritance. If the deceased brother was the firstborn son, his inheritance was a double share. However, if the deceased brother were childless, the living brother would be entitled to inherit an increased share; or if he is the oldest surviving son he would be entitled to a double share of the increased share.

=== Levirate-type marriages other than yibbum ===
A detailed account of a levirate-type marriage in the Hebrew Bible is the unusual union of Judah and his daughter-in-law Tamar found in Genesis 38:8. The case is not strictly a case of yibbum as Judah was Tamar's father-in-law, and also the case pre-dates the biblical obligation. It may be a reflection of contemporaneous Middle East practices. Tamar's earlier marriage to Onan, however, did conform with the specific circumstances describing the requirements of yibbum outlined in Deuteronomy, as Onan was the brother of Tamar's deceased husband Er.

Another example of an analogous arrangement to yibbum is recounted in the Book of Ruth. After the death of her husband, Ruth is noticed and welcomed by her husband's kinsman, Boaz. After Ruth is rejected by an anonymous Ploni Almoni, Boaz marries her. In this case as well, the kin in question would not have been subject to the biblical levirate marriage obligation, as neither Ploni Almoni nor Boaz were brothers of Ruth's late husband.

== Laws of yibbum and halizah ==
Yibbum
Halakhic texts relating to this article
- Torah: Genesis 38 Deuteronomy 25:5–10 Ruth 3–4
- Babylonian Talmud: Yevamot; Gittin 34b-37b
- Mishneh Torah: Yibbum V'Chalitza
- Shulchan Aruch: Even HaEzer 156-157

Halakha (Jewish law) has a tradition around yibbum. These laws were first recorded in the Mishna and Talmud in Yevamot, and were later codified by Maimonides in the Mishneh Torah. The subject is considered one of the most intricate in Jewish law, partly because of the complication that arise from multiple brothers and multiple wives. Yibbum is an exception to the biblical prohibition for a man to have sexual relations with "his brother's wife" found for example in Leviticus 18:16 and 20:21. (See Incest in the Bible.)

=== When yibbum applies ===
The obligation for yibbum is found at Deuteronomy 25:5–10, which requires that when a married man dies without having any children, male or female, from any relationship (including pre-marital and extra-marital), his widow and his brother must perform either yibbum or halizah. For the laws of yibbum only brothers that share a common father are considered brothers. In the event of several brothers in the family, the eldest surviving brother has the first right of yibbum. In order for yibbum to apply, all of the following conditions must be met:

1. The brothers share a common father
2. The dead brother had no surviving children, male or female, from any relationship, at the time of his death
3. The brother performing yibbum was born before his brother's death
4. The brother performing yibbum is not forbidden, other than by her marriage to the dead brother, to marry any of his dead brother's widows (e.g. if any of them is his daughter, yibbum does not apply to him at all)(and in the Talmudic discussion of such a case the other wives are referred to as tzarat habat, the "daughter's rival")
5. The brother performing yibbum is physically capable of fathering children
6. The widow is or was physically capable of bearing children

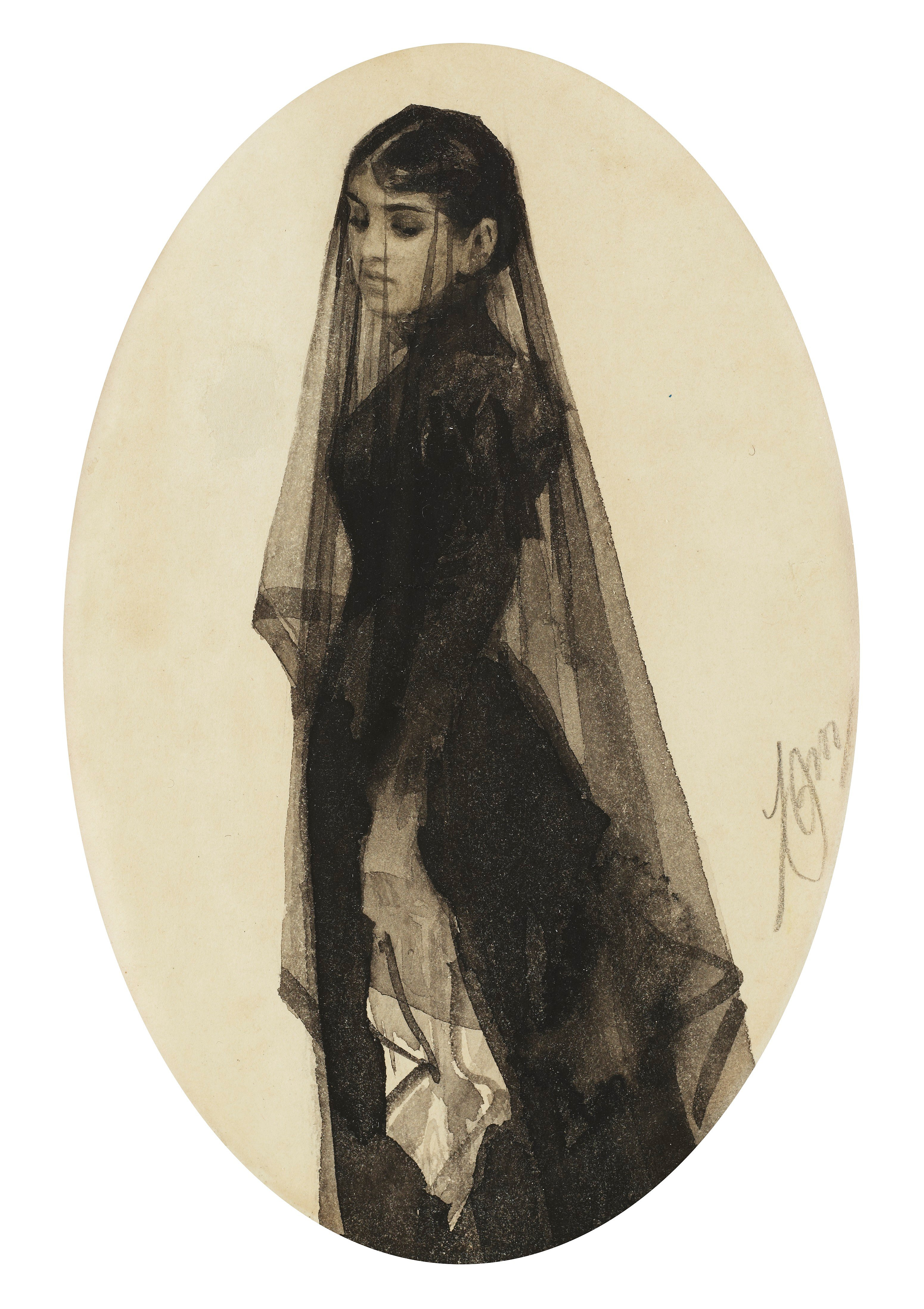
The Widow (1882-83) by Anders Zorn. The widow has to remain unmarried until yibbum or halizah has been performed.

Even if some of the brothers do not meet all the conditions to be eligible for yibbum, as long as there is one that does, yibbum applies to him. If there is no brother who meets all of the conditions, neither yibbum nor halizah applies, except if the widow is forbidden to marry the brother as a result of a prohibition not involving the punishment of kareth (spiritual excision), in which case halitzah would apply.

=== Restrictions related to yibbum ===
It is forbidden for any of the widows to remarry until yibbum or halizah has been performed. If the deceased left multiple wives yibbum may only be performed with one of them, at which time the remaining wives are permitted to remarry. Likewise, if yibbum is not performed, halizah is only performed with one of the widows, after which all of them may remarry.

If all surviving brothers are still children, the widow must wait until one reaches halachic adulthood, at which time he can perform yibbum or halizah. Similarly, if the brother is missing, the woman is required to wait until he is located. This can lead to a situation similar to an agunah.

=== How yibbum is performed ===
According to biblical law, there is no need for a marriage ceremony between the widow and the deceased's brother as they are already bound by divine decree, thus, they need only cohabit to perform yibbum. Nevertheless, the Sages decreed that the couple perform a marriage-like ceremony called maamar, recite the marriage blessings (sheva brachot) and write a prenuptial agreement (ketubah).

Only one brother may perform yibbum. The oldest brother is given preference, but if he refuses, the brother who is second in line can perform yibbum, and if a brother performed yibbum out of turn, it is nevertheless valid. After one brother performs yibbum or halizah, none of the brothers may marry any of the other widows.

=== Other laws ===
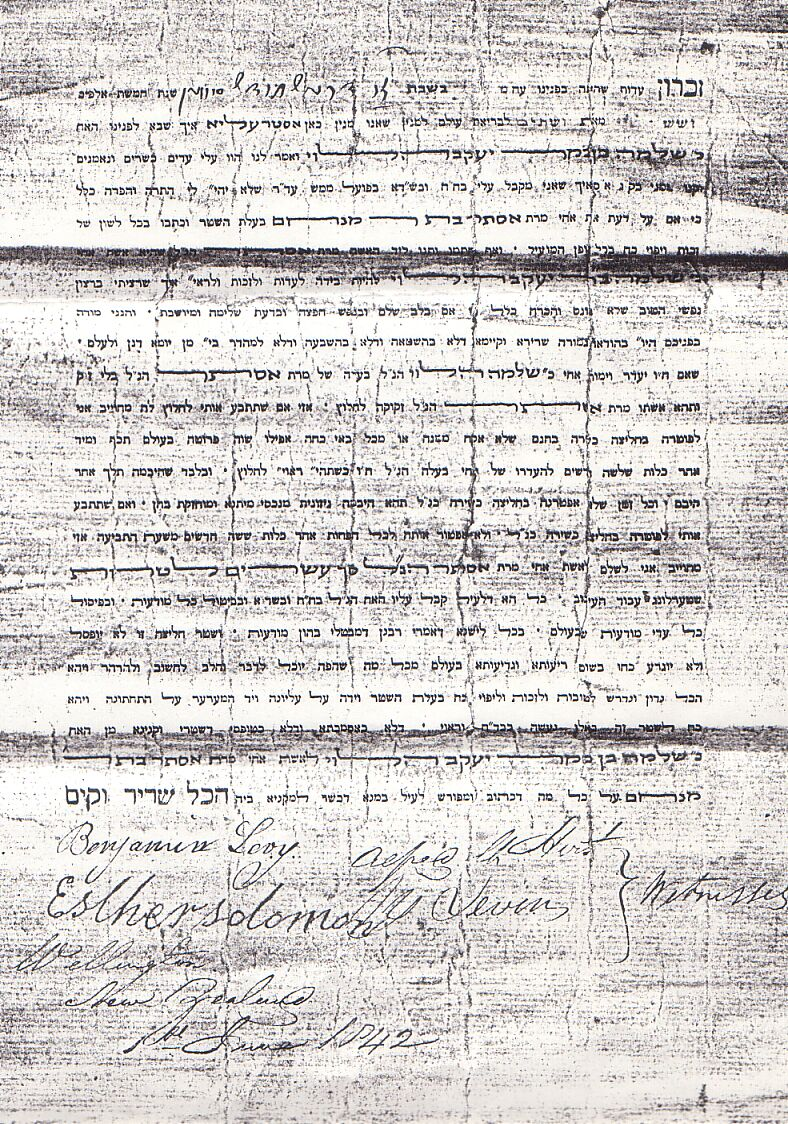
19th century Ketuba or Yibbum from New Zealand, including a promise to take care of the bride if the husband dies before any children are born.

Because there is a general prohibition on a man marrying his brother's wife, anytime that a yibbum is not required (for example, the deceased had a child), levirate marriage is forbidden. Likewise, anytime that there is a doubt whether yibbum is required, it is also forbidden and halizah is required.

The Samaritans followed a slightly different course, which may indicate an earlier custom; they practised yibbum only when the woman was betrothed and the marriage had not been consummated. Karaite Judaism appear to have followed the same practice, and Benjamin Nahawandi as well as Elijah Bashyazi favored it.

== History ==
The rabbis in the time of the mishnah added formal marriage requirements, such as the necessity of betrothing the deceased brother's wife in front of two competent witnesses by giving to her money or an object having certain money value, and of writing out a ketubah (marriage contract), but over the centuries the performance of levirate marriage (yibbum) declined in favor of halizah (the act of refusal).

By Talmudic times the practice of levirate marriage was deemed secondary in preference to halizah by some of the rabbis, because of the brother's questionable intentions; indeed, to marry a brother's widow for her beauty was regarded by Abba Saul as equivalent to incest. Bar Kappara also recommends halizah. A difference of opinion appears among the later authorities, with Isaac Alfasi, Maimonides, and the Spanish school generally upholding the custom, while Rabbeinu Tam and the Northern school prefer halizah. A change of religion on the part of the surviving brother does not affect the obligation of the levirate, or its alternative, the halizah. Additionally, if the surviving brother is married, Ashkenazim, who follow the takkanah of Gershom ben Judah abolishing polygamy, would be compelled to perform halizah.

Today, yibbum is a rare occurrence among Jewish communities, most claiming that if the intent is not purely for the sake of pro-creation, the act would thereby become marred and tantamount to an act of whoredom. Therefore, it was made virtually non-existent with other communities. Orthodox Jews in modern times have generally upheld the position of Rabbeinu Tam and perform halizah rather than yibbum. Yemenite Jews, though orthodox, practised yibbum until the en masse Aliyah of Jews to Eretz Israel in the last century. In 1950, the Rabbinate of Israel, along with the Chief Sephardic Rabbi, forbade its practice amongst the Yemenites, citing a need for "uniformity amongst the Jewish groups," and only permitted those who were already married through levirate marriage from outside the country. Conservative Judaism formally retains it. Reform Judaism and Reconstructionist Judaism have abolished it.

== In popular culture ==
Yibbum forms the plot of the Hallmark movie Loving Leah.

== See also ==
- Takkanot Shum
- Widow conservation
- Nata pratha
