= Judengasse in Worms =

Coordinates: 49.633956°N 8.366723°E

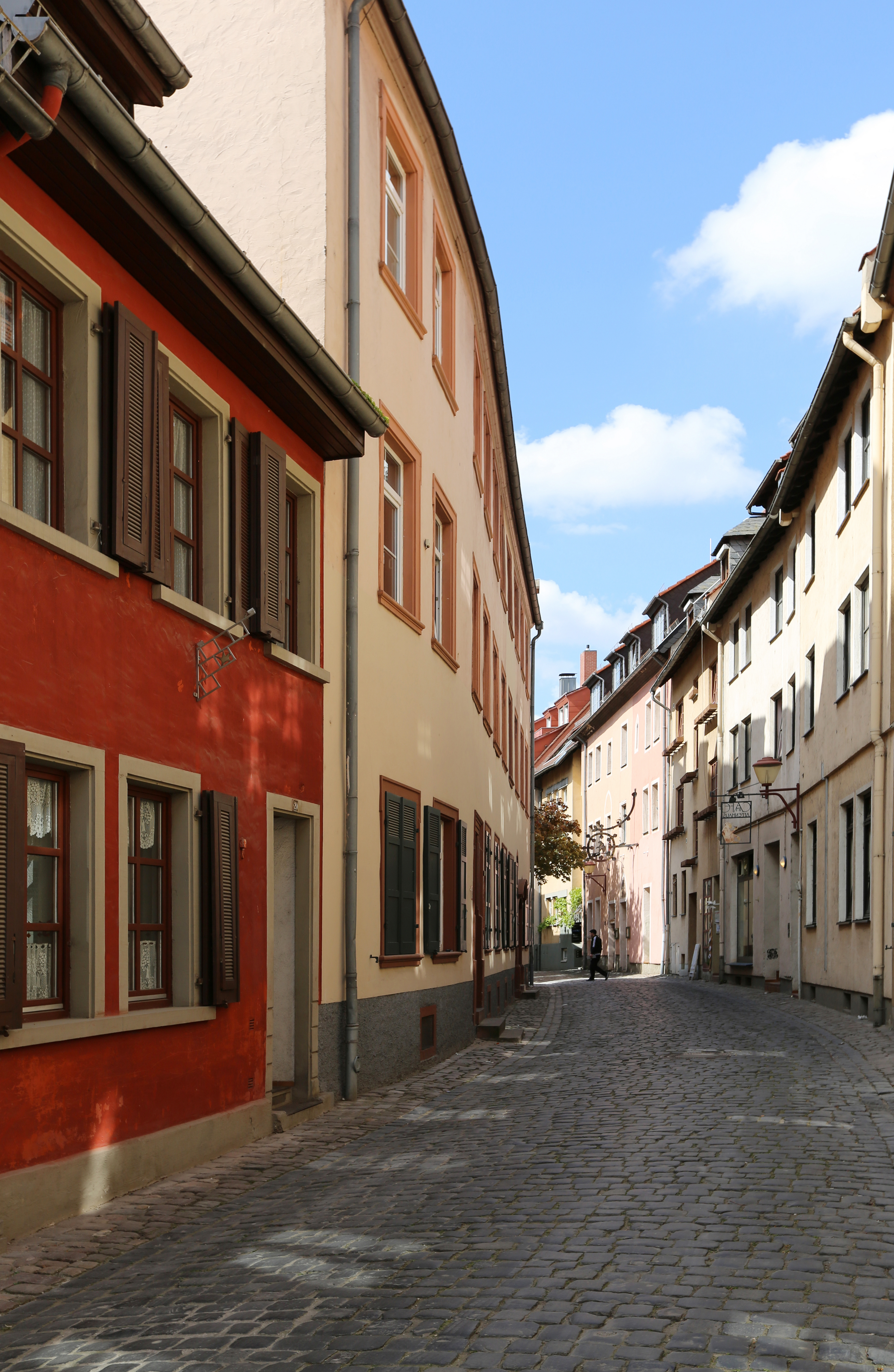
The Judengasse in Worms near house number 20, view towards the west

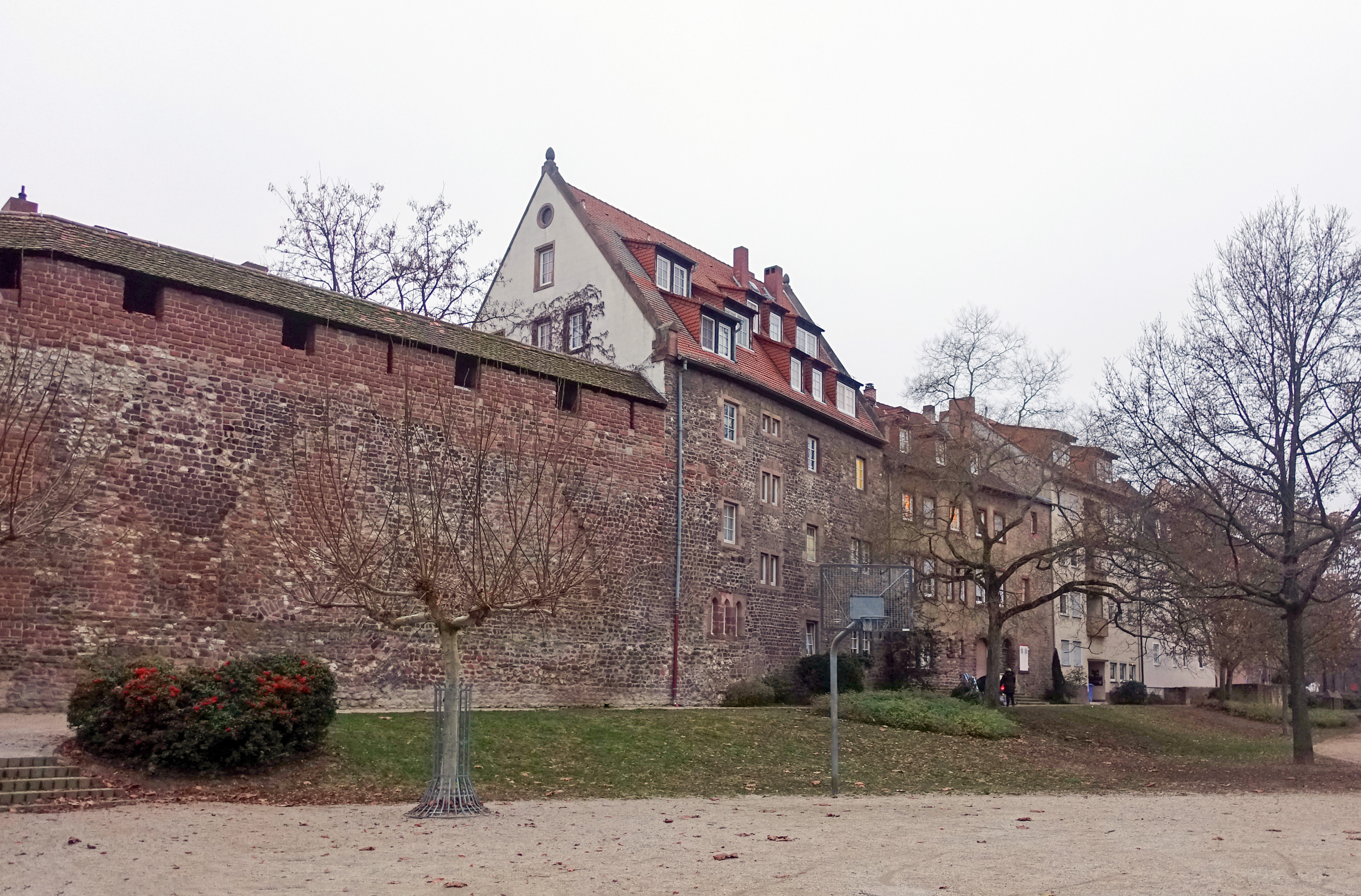
Rear side of the northern row of houses: the buildings used the city wall as a rear wall

The Judengasse in Worms (German: Wormser Judengasse, literally: Jewish Alley in Worms) was the Jewish ghetto of Worms from the Late Middle Ages until the end of the 18th century.

== Location ==
The Judengasse was located at the northern edge of the medieval city center. The houses on the northern side used the inner city wall as their rear wall.

The Judengasse consisted of two streets:

- The main Judengasse, running parallel to the northeastern section of the city wall between the Martin Gate and the Bärengasse. It was separated from the rest of the city by gates at both ends. The southeastern gate was called the "Judenpforte" ("Jews' Gate"), leading directly through the wall to the Rhine. It was sealed during reconstruction after the 1689 destruction of the city and reopened after the ghetto was abolished, temporarily known in the 19th century as the "Hamburger Gate". On the western end, a gate led to what is today Friedrichstraße. The Rashi Gate (Raschitor), a breach through the wall to the north towards today's Berliner Ring, and the Karolingerstraße, which crosses the Judengasse today, were only built in 1907/08.
- The Hintere Judengasse ("Secondary Judengasse"), intersecting the main street at a right angle in front of the synagogue. Before Karolingerstraße was built, this rear lane rejoined the main Judengasse on its eastern end.

== History ==
While during the High Middle Ages Jews could own property and live throughout the city, after the Black Death pogrom of 1349, ghettoization began. From that point until 1792, Jews were confined to the Judengasse and Hintere Judengasse. The ghetto gates were removed in 1801. After the destruction of World War II, some houses were not rebuilt, while others were reconstructed in the style of the 1950s. Only in the 1970s did preservation efforts begin to focus on maintaining the historical appearance of the street.

== Architecture ==
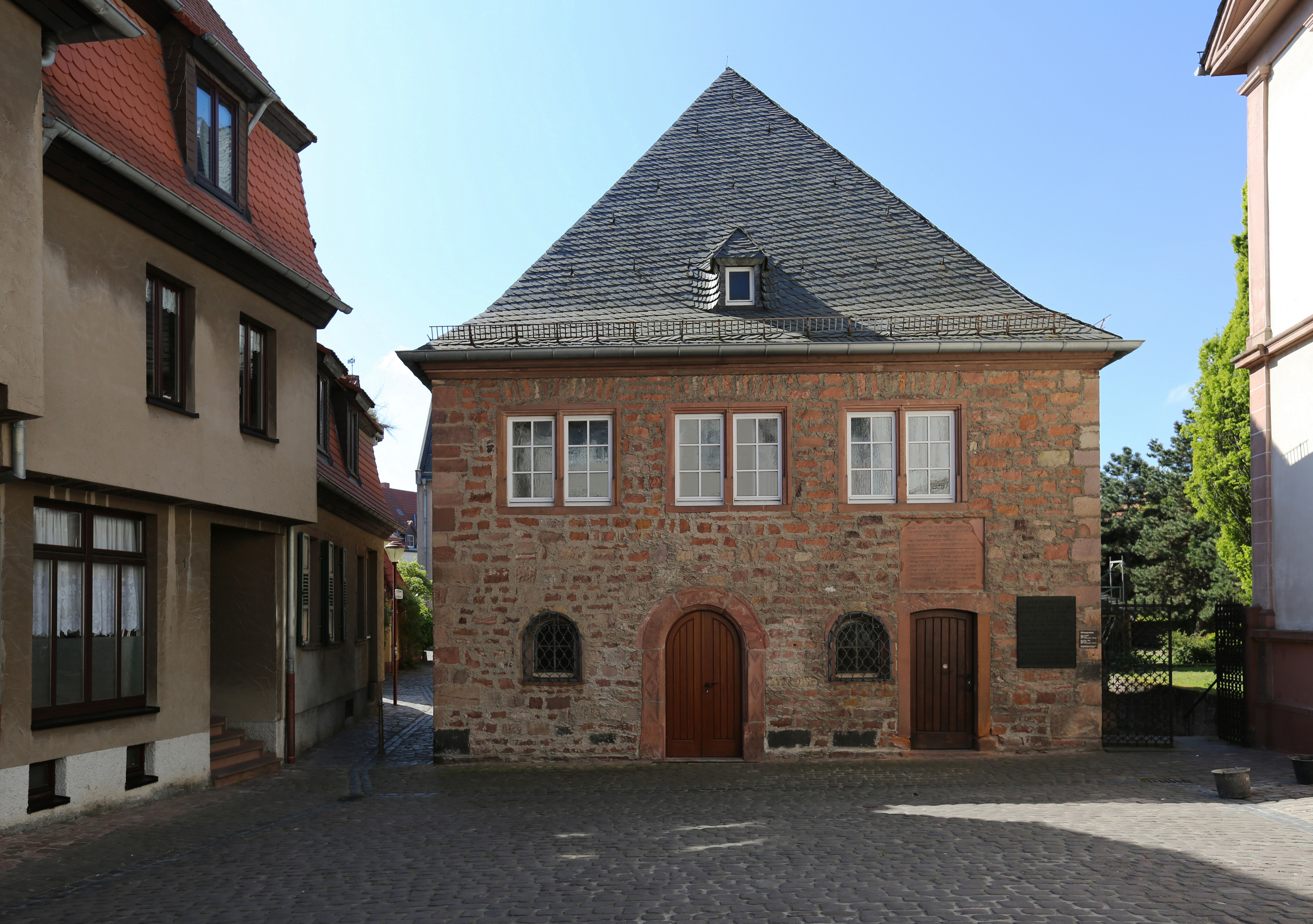
The Worms Synagogue at the center of the Judengasse

Most buildings in the Judengasse did not have gable, with upper floors built in half-timbered style and plastered. Due to space constraints, houses were narrow and tall, usually three stories high. Originally, the northern row of houses was set slightly apart from the city wall, but during reconstruction in the early 18th century, the wall was incorporated into the buildings' rear sides, with windows added in some places.

Following the widespread destruction during the 1615 expulsion of Jews, the Nine Years' War in 1689, and again during World War II, little above-ground historical fabric remains. However, several historic cellars, some dating back to the 14th century, still exist beneath the buildings. Because the post-war reconstruction often followed historical property boundaries, the original building lines have largely been preserved.

Since at least the Early Modern Period, the houses bore house signs (as house numbers were not yet in use), some of which survive. These signs were also adopted as surnames by the residents and appear on gravestones in the Jewish cemetery.

At the central square of the Judengasse stands the medieval synagogue. Other notable buildings included the community house ("House of the Sun") and the second, Orthodox Levy Synagogue, consecrated in 1875 but destroyed during the Kristallnacht, in World War II, and later by demolition.

South of the old synagogue was the synagogue courtyard, which now serves as the entrance to the mikveh. It was the site for the community's sukkah during Sukkot and for weddings held under a canopy according to Jewish tradition. South of the garden is the Rashi House, located on the site of a historic building that served over 800 years in various capacities—as a Talmudic academy, hospital, celebration hall, rabbi's residence, and nursing home. The modern building, reconstructed in the 1980s, now houses the Worms City Archive and a Jewish museum.

== See also ==
- Worms Synagogue
- Frankfurter Judengasse

== Literature ==
- Generaldirektion Kulturelles Erbe Rheinland-Pfalz (ed.): Die SchUM-Städte am Rhein. Schnell & Steiner, Regensburg 2012, ISBN 978-3-7954-2661-3.
- Irene Spille: Denkmaltopographie Bundesrepublik Deutschland. Kulturdenkmäler in Rheinland-Pfalz 10 = Stadt Worms. Wernersche Verlagsgesellschaft, Worms 1992, ISBN 978-3-88462-084-7.
- Mathilde Grünewald: Unter dem Pflaster von Worms. Archäologie in der Stadt, Lindenberg im Allgäu 2012, ISBN 978-3-89870-754-1, pp. 100–221.
- Mathilde Grünewald: Judenviertel, in: Die Judengasse in Worms, archäologisch. Heimatjahrbuch für die Stadt Worms 2022, pp. 145–151. ISBN 978-3-947884-20-9. Download as PDF.
- Fritz Reuter: Warmaisa – das jüdische Worms. Von den Anfängen bis zum jüdischen Museum des Isidor Kiefer (1924). In: Geschichte der Stadt Worms. Ed. by Gerold Bönnen on behalf of the City of Worms. Theiss, Stuttgart 2005, ISBN 3-8062-1679-7.
- Fritz Reuter: Leopold Levy und seine Synagoge von 1875. Ein Beitrag zu Geschichte und Selbstverständnis der Wormser Juden im 19. Jahrhundert. In: Der Wormsgau 11 (1974/1975), S. 58–68.
