= Gershom ben Judah =

Rabbi

- Born: 960; Metz, Lotharingia
- Died: 1040
- Other names: Rabbeinu Gershom, Gershom Me'Or Hagolah

Gershom ben Judah (c. 960–1040), best known as Rabbeinu Gershom (Hebrew: רבנו גרשום, "Our teacher Gershom") and also commonly known to scholars of Rabbinic Judaism by the title Rabbeinu Gershom Me'Or Hagolah ("Our teacher Gershom the light of the exile"), was a famous Talmudist and Halakhist.

Less than a century after Gershom's death Rashi said of him, "all members of the Ashkenazi diaspora are students of his." As early as the 14th century, Asher ben Jehiel wrote that Rabbeinu Gershom's writings were "such permanent fixtures that they may well have been handed down on Mount Sinai."

He is most famous for the council he called around 1000 CE, in which he instituted various laws and bans, including prohibiting polygamy, requiring the consent of both parties to a divorce, modifying the rules concerning those who became apostates under compulsion, and prohibiting the opening of correspondence addressed to someone else.

== Biography ==
Gershom was born in Metz in 960. After his first wife died he married a widow named Bonna and settled at Mainz, where he taught the Talmud. During his lifetime Mainz became a center of Torah and Jewish scholarship for many Jewish communities in Europe that had formerly been connected with the Talmudic academies in Babylonia.

== Works ==
Questions of religious law were addressed to him from all countries, and measures which he authorized had legal force among all the Jews of Europe.

Gershom's literary activity was similarly fruitful. He is celebrated for his works in the field of Biblical exegesis, the Masorah, and lexicography. His school composed glosses on the text of the Talmud, and wrote commentaries on several treatises of the latter which were very popular and gave an impulse to the production of other works of the kind. His selichot were inspired by the bloody persecutions of his time. Gershom also left a large number of rabbinical responsa, which are scattered throughout various collections.

He is the author of Seliha 42 – Zechor Berit Avraham ("Remember the Covenant of Abraham"), a liturgical poem recited by Ashkenazic Jews during the season of Rosh HaShana and Yom Kippur, which includes the following stanza:

The Holy City and its regions
are turned to shame and to spoils
and all its desirable things are buried and hidden
and nothing is left except this Torah.

== Synod and bans (Herem of Rabbenu Gershom) ==
He is famous for his religious bans within Judaism, which include:

- The prohibition of polygamy;
- The prohibition of divorcing a woman against her will;
- The modification of the rules concerning those who became apostates under compulsion;
- The prohibition of reading another person's private mail.

The influence of his ban can be seen in mail from the Middle Ages. A letter would contain the seal "B'chadrag" which meant that it was forbidden to open except by the recipient under the ban of Rabbeinu Gershom. His religious bans are still in force for Ashkenazi religious Jews and are used for establishment of law in modern Israel.

== See also ==
- Heter meah rabbanim

== Bibliography ==
With regard to the so-called Ordinances of Rabbi Gershom see especially

- Rosenthal, in Jubelschrift zum Siebzigsten Geburtstag des Dr. Israel Hildesheimer. Berlin, 1890; pp. 37 et seq.
