= Worms Synagogue =

Historical synagogue in Rhineland-Palatinate, Germany

- German: Worms Synagoge
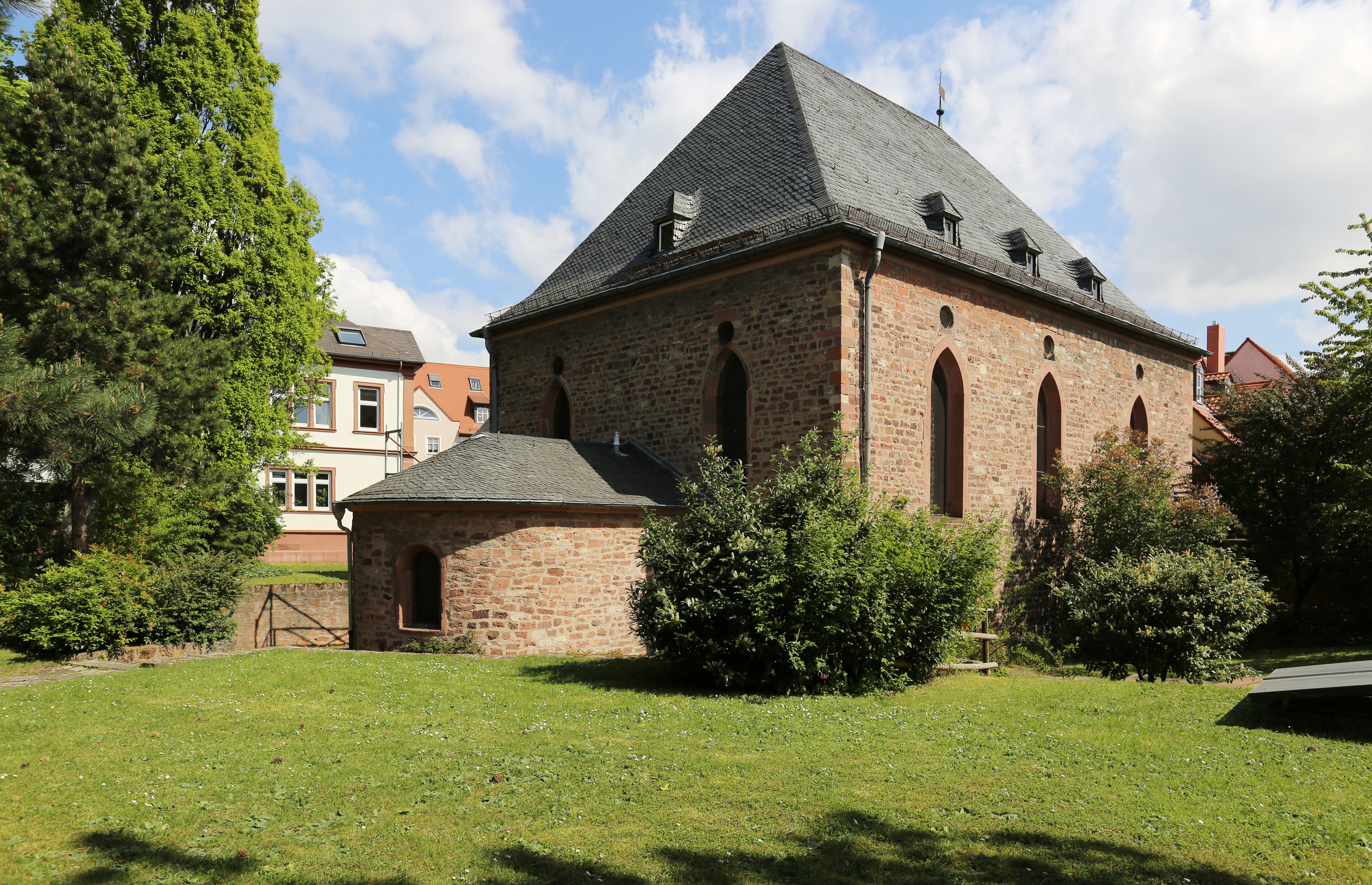
- Rear view of the Worms Synagogue, 2005

- Location of the synagogue in Rhineland-Palatinate

Religion
- Affiliation: Judaism
- Ecclesiastical or organizational status: Synagogue
- Status: Active

Location
- Location: Hintere Judengasse 6, Worms, Rhineland-Palatinate
- Country: Germany
- Interactive map of Worms Synagogue
- Coordinates: 49°38′1″N 8°21′59″E

Architecture
- Type: Synagogue architecture
- Style: Romanesque; Gothic
- Completed: 1034 (original); 1175 (second); 1961 (third)
- Materials: Stone; slate

Website
- schumstaedte.de/en/shum/worms/

UNESCO World Heritage Site
- Type: Cultural
- Criteria: ii, iii, vi
- Designated: 2021
- Part of: ShUM Sites of Speyer, Worms and Mainz
- Reference no.: 1636

The Worms Synagogue (German: Synagoge Worms or German: Wormser Synagoge), also known as the Rashi Shul Synagogue, is a Jewish congregation and synagogue located in the Judengasse in the northern part of the city center of Worms, in the Rhineland-Palatinate region of Germany.

Founded in the 11th century, the synagogue is one of the oldest in Germany. The Worms Synagogue was inscribed on the UNESCO World Heritage List in 2021 (along with other medieval Jewish cultural sites in Speyer and Mainz), due to its historical importance and its testimony to the European Jewish cultural tradition through millennia.

== History ==
The first synagogue at the site was built in 1034 and is therefore regarded as the oldest existing synagogue in Germany. The building was destroyed during the First Crusade in 1096 and subsequently rebuilt in 1175 in the Romanesque style. In 1186 a subterranean mikveh was constructed southwest of the synagogue. In 1213 a structure known as the "Women's Synagogue" was built adjacent to the main synagogue. It later served as a women's gallery for the women of Worms.

During the pogroms of 1349 (Persecution of Jews during the Black Death) and 1615 the synagogue was badly damaged: in both pogroms the vaulted ceilings and the walls were heavily damaged. During reconstruction after 1355 Gothic forms for the window and the vault were chosen. Of comparable seriousness was the damage after the fire of 1689 during the Nine Years' War. When the building was restored in 1700, the interior was renovated in period style.

In response to growing dissatisfaction among Orthodox members of the Jewish community with the increasingly progressive character of the Worms Synagogue - particularly after the removal of the gender separation in 1842 and the installation of an organ in 1877 - Leopold Levy (1801–1877), a grain merchant, established a new synagogue. He converted his former grain warehouse in the Judengasse into a place of worship that met Orthodox standards and had the building consecrated in 1875. Levy was careful to ensure that the new synagogue remained under the ownership of the main Jewish community of Worms, aiming to prevent fragmentation into smaller sectarian groups.

On Kristallnacht in 1938 the synagogue was once again attacked and reduced to rubble. It was painstakingly reconstructed in 1961, using as many of the original stones as could be salvaged. The synagogue, open as a museum, continues to be a functioning synagogue used by the Jewish community.

In May 2010, the synagogue was firebombed by arsonists, suspected to be anti-semites. The firebombs were thrown against eight corners of the stone building and against a window, but no one was injured and no serious damage to the building was reported.

== Architecture ==
Built at the point when the late Romanesque style was fading and Gothic rising, the rectangular prayer hall features a pair of Romanesque columns supporting groin vaults. The windows in the thick stone walls are simple gothic arches. The windows in the adjoining study hall, the so-called Rashi Shul, have rounded Romanesque arches. The women’s section of the prayer hall has Romanesque windows on the eastern wall, and gothic windows on the western wall.

== Gallery ==
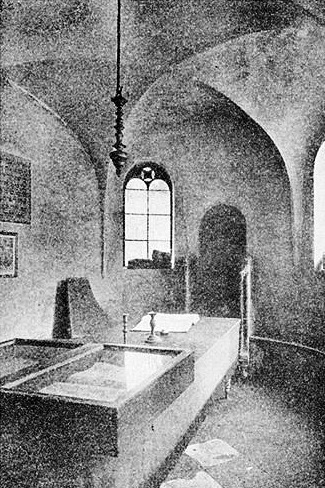
Pre-1938 interior of the Rashi Shul

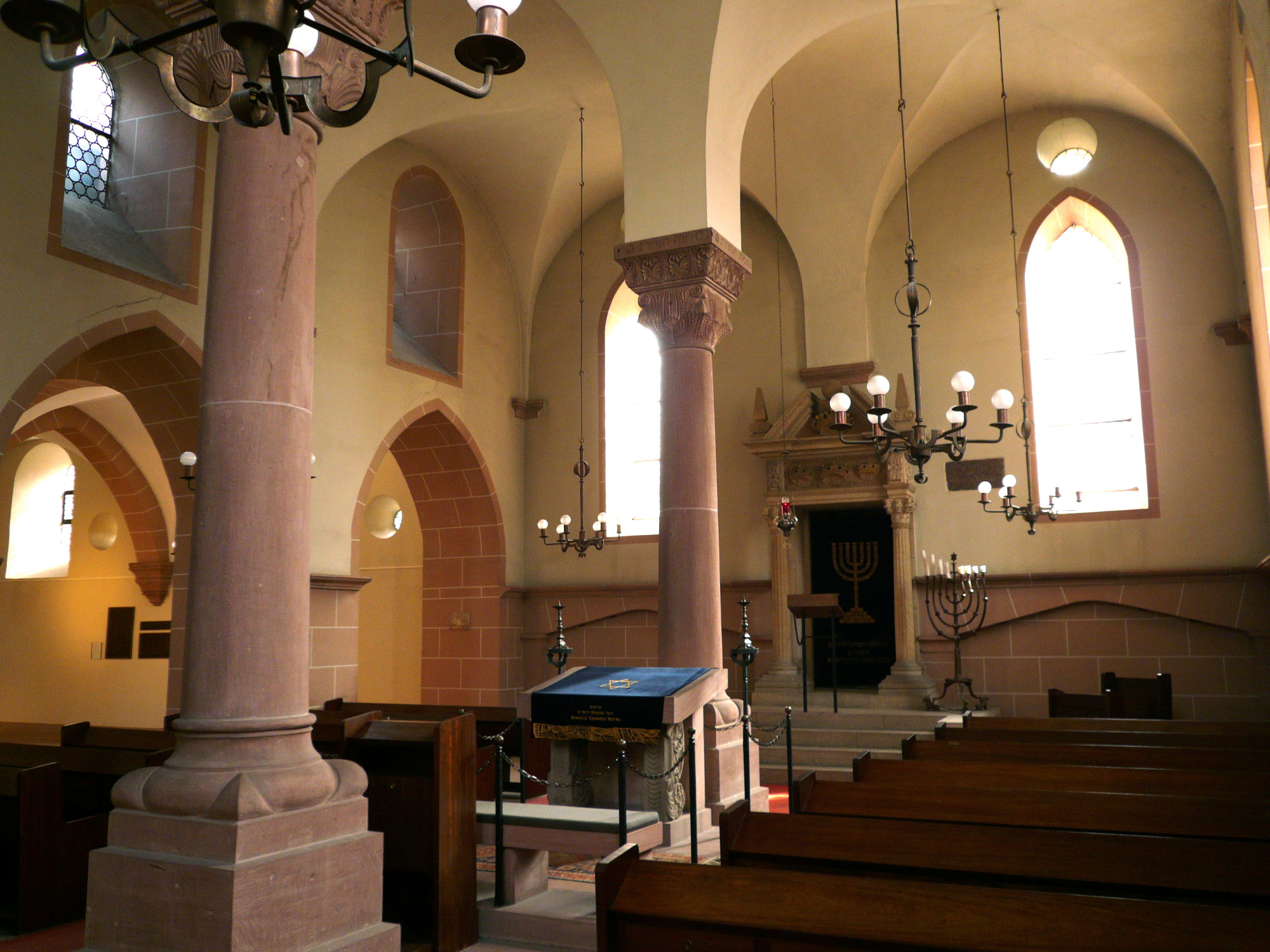
Interior

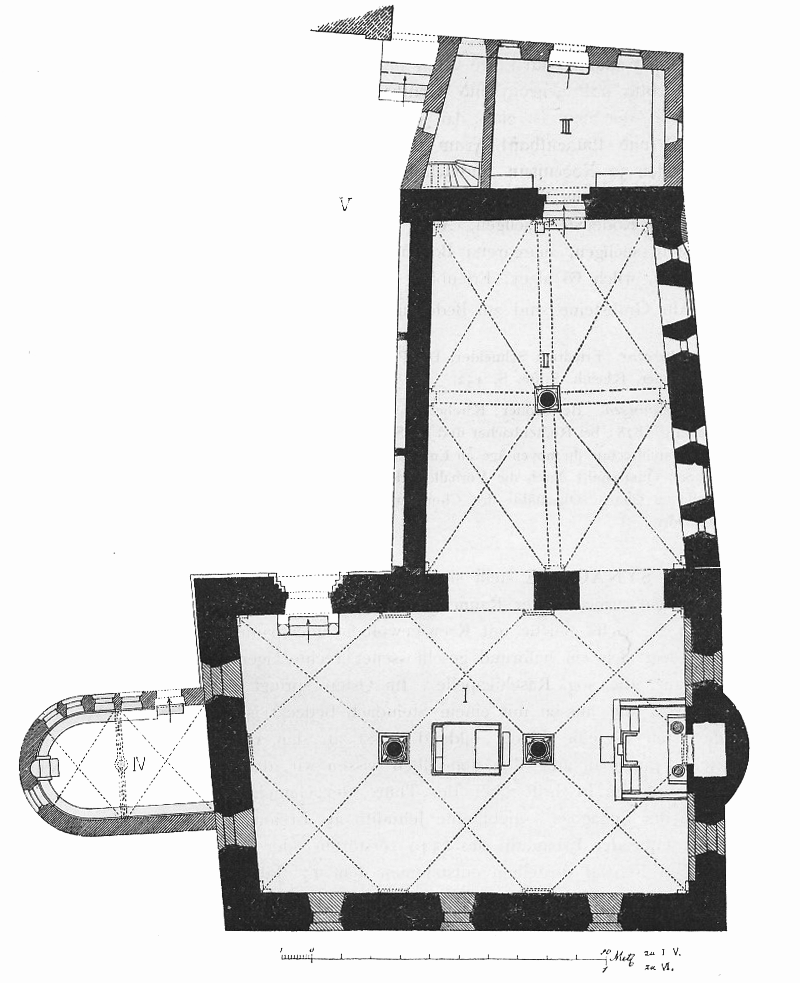
Plan of the synagogue (I-Main synagogue. II-Women's synagogue. III-Lobby. IV-Rashi Shul)

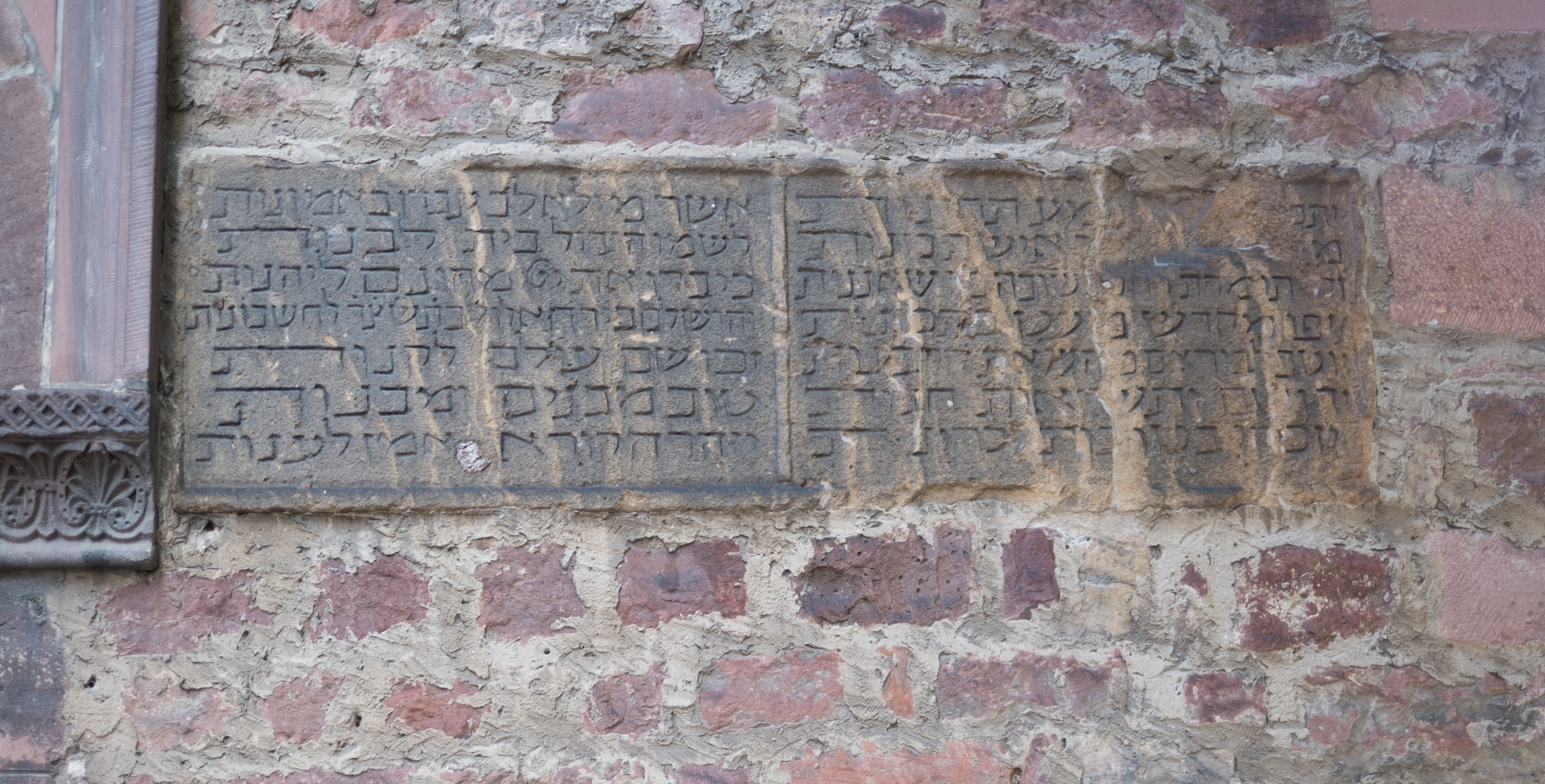
The dedication inscription for the synagogue, written in 1034

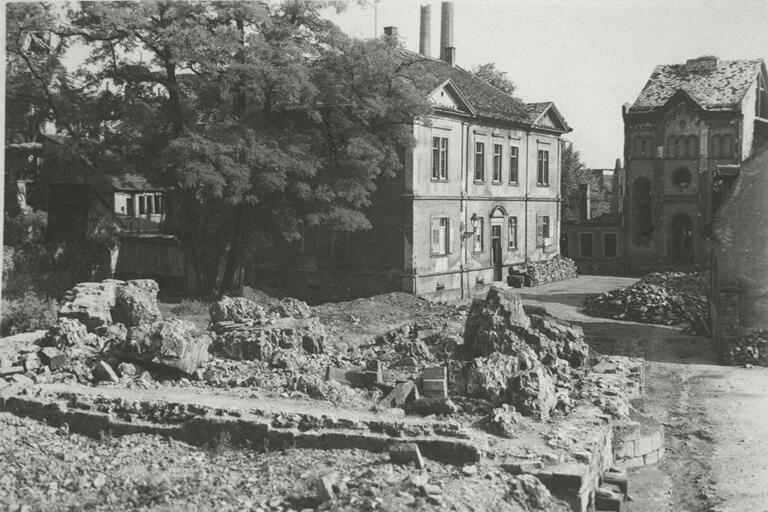
Ruins of the synagogue, 1945

== See also ==
- History of the Jews in Germany
- List of synagogues in Germany (in German)
- Oldest synagogues in the World
- Levy Synagogue of Worms
