= Chalitzah =

Jewish legal process

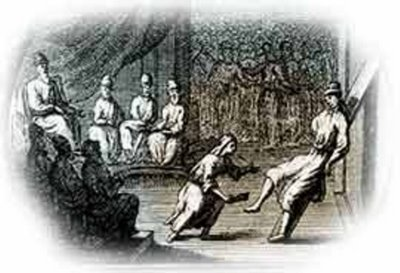
Engraving of a chalitza ceremony

Chalitzah or halitsah (Hebrew: חליצה, romanized: ḥălīṣā) in Rabbinical Judaism is the process by which a childless widow and a brother of her deceased husband may avoid the duty to marry under the biblical system of yibbum (levirate marriage).

The process involves the widow making a declaration, taking off a shoe of the brother (i.e., her brother-in-law), and spitting on the floor. Through this ceremony, the brother and any other brothers are released from the obligation of marrying the woman to conceive a child that would be considered the progeny of the deceased man. The ceremony of halitsa makes the widow free to marry whomever she desires, except for a Kohen "priest". (Deuteronomy 25:5–10).

It is sufficient for only one brother-in-law to perform the ceremony. Yibbum (Genesis 38:8) is thus modified in the Deuteronomic code attributed to Moses by permitting the surviving brother to refuse to marry his brother's widow provided he submits to the ceremony of halitsa. In the Talmudic period, this tendency was intensified by the apprehension that the brother-in-law might desire to marry his brother's widow for motives other than that of "establishing a name unto his brother." Therefore, many Talmudic and later rabbis preferred halitsa to marriage. As a result, yibbum fell into disuse; now halitsa is the general rule and marriage is the rare exception. However, the yibbum law is still presumed to be in force, thus making a childless widow who remarries someone other than her brother-in-law without performing the halitsa ceremony an adulterer. If there are no brothers-in-law, the point is moot as there is no biblical commandment for any other male relatives to marry the widow.

== The ceremony ==
Deuteronomy describes the ceremony simply. In the presence of town elders, the widow recites a prescribed formula which scolds him for not building his brother's household, loosens the shoe of the brother-in-law, and spits on the floor. In the Talmud, however, the rabbis explained the ceremony as a more solemn and public act. The Halizah is a very humiliating ceremony for both the parties involved. It is believed that when the ceremony is performed publicly, the humiliation and the shame that the brother and the widow feel is meant to break the bond that they hold. The ceremony must take place before a court of three, who need not be very learned, but must at least understand Hebrew. All those who are disqualified from testifying in legal matters are disqualified also from acting on this board of judges. These three appoint two others to assist them, and at the service on the evening preceding the day of the ceremony they appoint a place for its performance, to give the matter more publicity. The place chosen is usually the synagogue court or the house of the rabbi, although the ceremony may take place in the house of the widow. All investigations into the concerned parties are conducted the previous day, on which both are instructed in ceremony details, and on which the yebamah (widowed sister-in-law) is not allowed to eat. The halitzah should not be performed in the evening, nor on a Sabbath or a holiday, nor on the eve of a Sabbath or a holiday.

On the day set for the halitzah, immediately after the morning service, when all the people are still in the synagogue, the three judges and their two assistants, who also act as witnesses, meet at the appointed place. The three judges sit on one bench, the two assistants on a bench placed beside it; the yabam (brother-in-law) and the yebamah stand between them. Before the ceremony, a public examination establishes the relationship of the parties and their maturity. If one is a minor, a deaf-mute, a mute, or mentally handicapped, or has a crooked or turned foot, the halitzah cannot be performed. The court must also know whether she is left-handed or whether he is left-footed, and must be convinced that more than ninety-one days have passed since the death of her husband.

To establish these matters it is not necessary to have legally eligible witnesses. Even those who are otherwise disqualified from testifying may become witnesses. Both the yabam and the yebamah must be made aware of the fact that by this ceremony the widow becomes free to marry whomever she may desire.

== The halitzah shoe ==
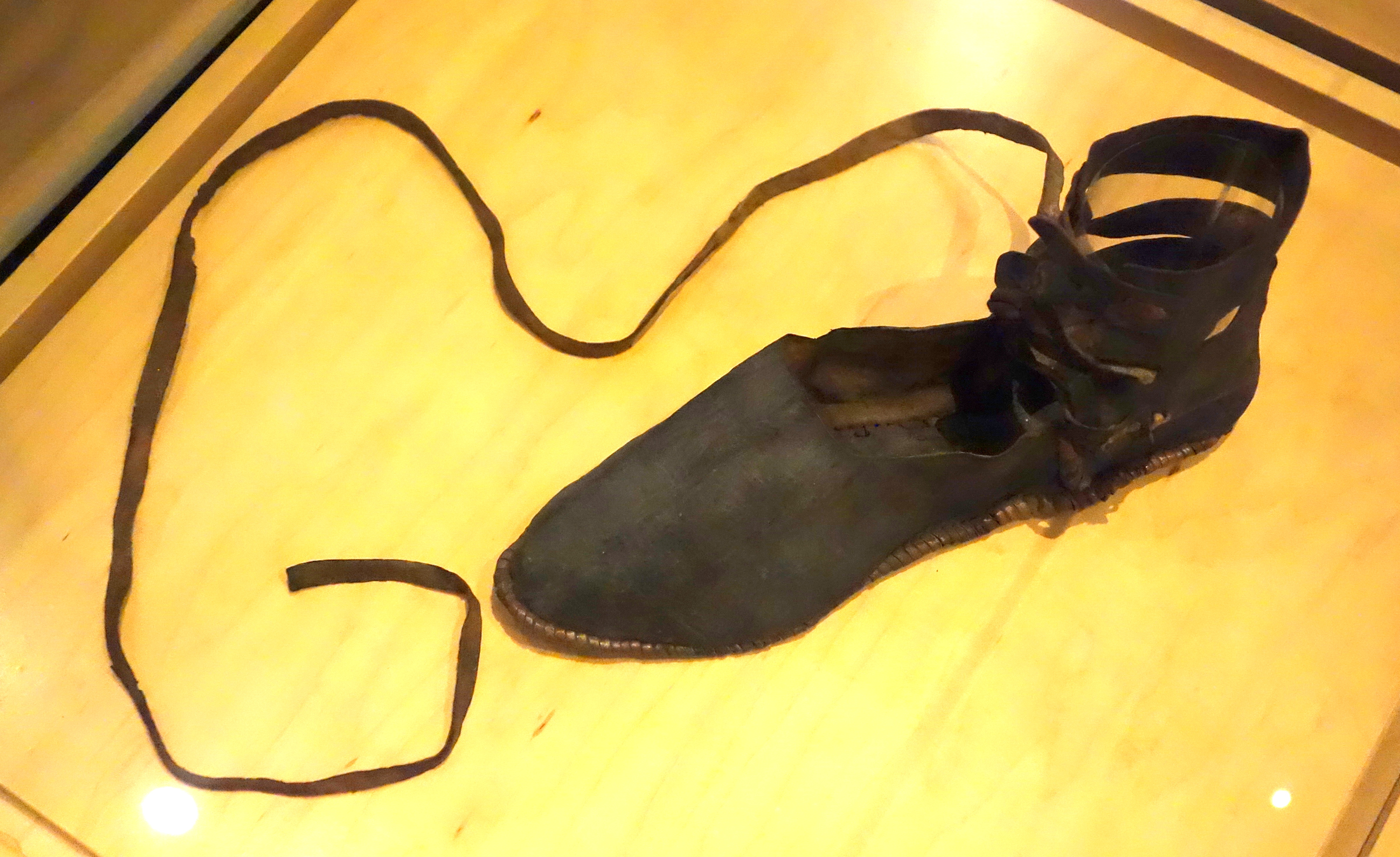
A halitzah shoe, New York, 20th century, in the Bata Shoe Museum

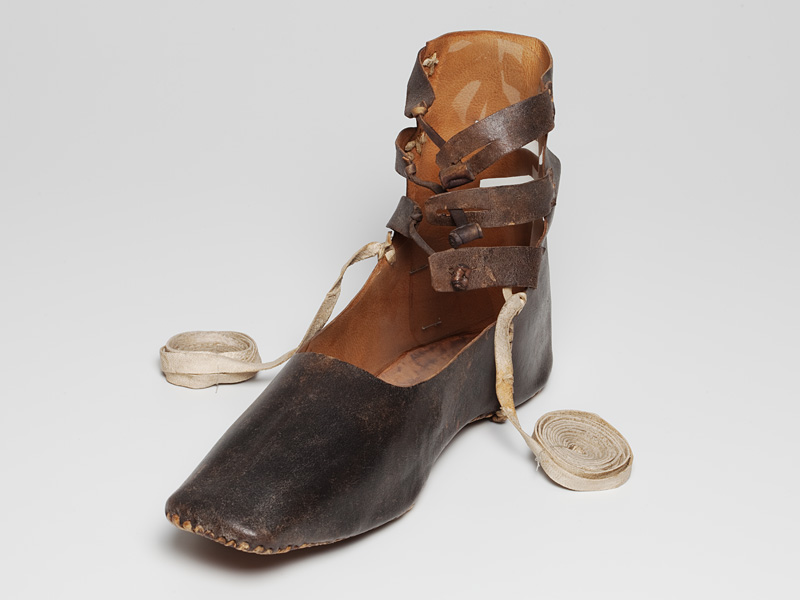
19th century Halizah shoe, Jewish Museum of Switzerland

After these preliminary details, and after the yabam makes a public declaration that he has not been forced by outside influence to submit to the halitzah, but acts of his own free will, the ceremony commences. The shoe, which is usually the property of the community, is brought forth and examined as to cleanliness and construction, in accordance with the precepts of the law. The halitzah shoe is made entirely of leather, usually from the hide of a kosher animal.

It is made of two pieces, the upper part and the sole, sewn together with leather threads. Three small straps are attached to the front of the shoe, each of which has a knot (humrata) at the top to fit a hole made on the other side of the shoe. Two white leather straps attach to either side of the shoe and fasten it to the leg.

The yabam must have his right foot, on which the shoe is placed, washed very scrupulously, and after he has strapped it on he must walk four cubits in the presence of the judges. Then the chief judge reads the following passage, which the yebamah repeats word for word:

"My brother-in-law refuses to raise unto his brother a name in Israel; he will not marry me."

Then the yabam repeats the sentence:

"I do not wish to take her."

He then presses his right foot against the floor while she loosens the straps with her right hand and, holding his leg in her left hand, takes off the shoe and throws it some distance away. Then she places herself in front of the yabam, spits on the floor in front of him, and repeats these words after the presiding judge:

"So shall it be done unto that man who will not build up his brother's house, and his name shall be called in Israel, 'the house of him that hath his shoe loosed."

She repeats the last phrase three times and the assembly recites it three times after her. Then the yabam returns the shoe to the court, and the judges say:

"May it be the will [of God] that Jewish women be no more subjected to halitzah or to yibbum."

As they rise, the chief of the judges says:

"Blessed be He who sanctified us with the commandments and statutes of Abraham our father."

All the passages recited by the yabam and by the yebamah must be read in Hebrew as they are found in the original in Deuteronomy. If the parties do not understand Hebrew the passages must be translated for them.

The ceremony of loosening the shoe has been explained in various ways. From the incident in the Book of Ruth (4:7–8), which certainly refers to this ancient custom, it seems the loosening of the shoe symbolized a transfer of rights, and had no stigma attached to it. Some later rabbis—Yechiel of Paris, for instance—say the removal of the shoe symbolized the entrance into a state of mourning. From the time the yabam refused to marry his brother's widow and thus perpetuate his name in Israel, the brother was considered dead, and the yebamah, by drawing off his shoe, thus declared to him that from that time on he was a mourner.

Another possibility comes from Wesley's Notes:

Deut 25:9 Loose his shoe - As a sign of his resignation of all his right to the woman, and to her husband's inheritance: for as the shoe was a sign of one's power and right, Psa 60:8 108:9, so the parting with the shoe was a token of the alienation of such right; and as a note of infamy, to signify that by this disingenuous action he was unworthy to be amongst free - men, and fit to be reduced to the condition of the meanest servants, who used to go barefoot (Isa 20:2,4).

Deut 25:10 His name - That is, his person, and his posterity also. So it was a lasting blot.

A similar example of renouncing rights by removing one's shoe, in this case the renunciation of rights to redeem one's brother's land, appears in the Book of Ruth.

== Halitzah document ==
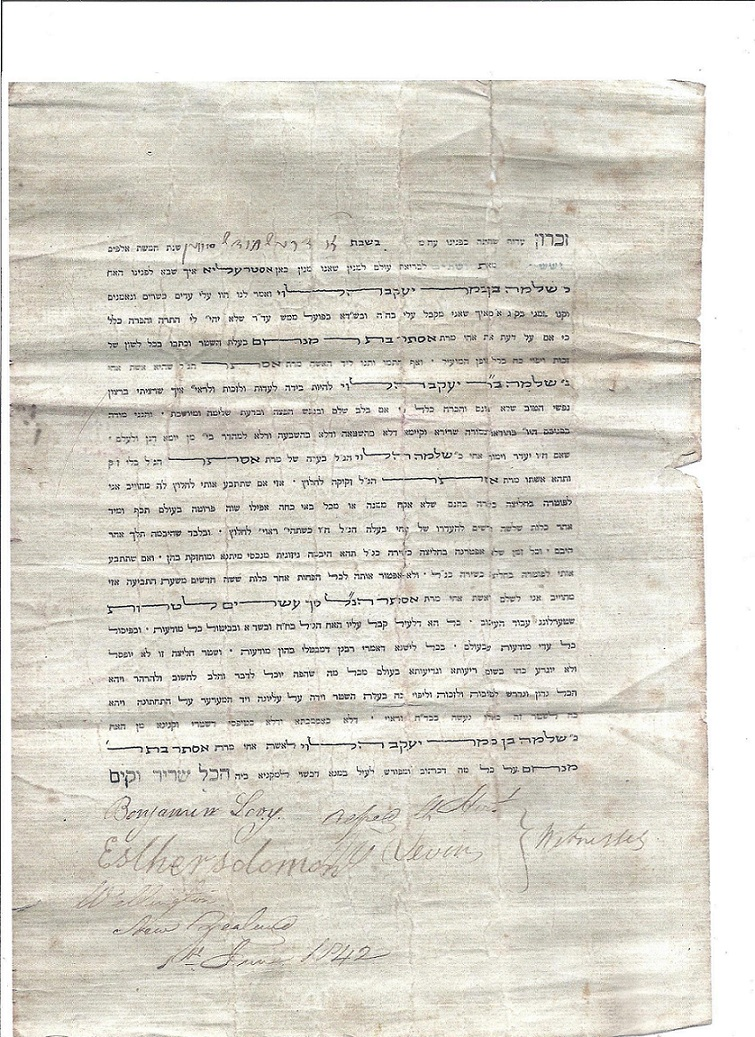
Marriage contract of Esther Solomon and Benjamin Levy, Wellington, New Zealand, 1 June 1842, witnessed by Alfred Hort and Nathaniel William Levin

To prevent the yabam from extorting money from the widow who wishes release from the shackles of perpetual widowhood, the Rabbis established the institution of the shetar halitzah ("halitzah document"). This institution provides that at a young couple's marriage, all brothers must sign a document pledging to submit to halitzah without remuneration, in case their brother dies childless. In the case of a minor brother, who could not legally sign the document, the institution of the shetar bitchon halitzah, established by the Rabbis for such cases, had the father of the groom promise to pay money to the bride if the minor son should later refuse the halitzah ceremony. The practice of signing these halitzah documents has fallen out of currency in North America.

== Frequency ==
Today Halizhah is a requirement of law in Israel. No Orthodox rabbi will perform the Yibbum; most dismiss the idea of Levirate marriage as outdated. Reform Jews on the other hand dismiss both the idea of Yibbum and Halizhah all together. Therefore, although rare, only Orthodox Jews still observe halitzah in all its details when the occasion requires. There are generally only between 10 and 20 ceremonies per year in Israel.

== In Reform Judaism ==
The Reform view, as expressed in various treatises written by the leaders of the movement, and as adopted at the different rabbinical conferences held in Germany and in America, is that the ceremony of halitzah is not essential to the remarriage of the widow. The Philadelphia Conference (1869) resolved that "the precept of levirate marriage and of halizah has lost to us all meaning, import, and binding force." The Second Israelite Synod, held in Augsburg (1871), passed a resolution to the same effect, adding that "for the sake of liberty of conscience, however, no rabbi will refuse, on request of the parties, to conduct the ceremony of halizah in a proper form."

== See also ==
- Yibbum
- Takkanot Shum
