= Punklezmerap =

Single by Eprhyme

from the album Waywordwonderwill
- A-side: "Punklezmerap"
- B-side: "Where The Heart Is"
- Released: March 4, 2008
- Genre: Jewish hip hop, alternative hip hop
- Length: 2:11
- Label: K
- Songwriter: Eprhyme
- Producer: Smoke

Eprhyme singles chronology
"Punklezmerap" (2008)	"Shomer Salaam" (2009)

"Punklezmerap" is a song by American rapper Eprhyme, the lead single from his debut solo album Waywordwonderwill (2008). It was released by K Records on March 4, 2008. Produced by Smoke of Oldominion and featuring Nomy Lamm on vocals, the song heavily samples from klezmer and traditional Jewish music. Lyrically, the song details Eprhyme's musical and personal evolution. At the time of its release, "Punklezmerap" was the first K Records hip hop recording in over a decade.

== Music video ==
The video, directed by Lenny Bass, was filmed in the basement of fashion designer Levi Okunov's boutique. It features cameos from Shir Yaakov of Darshan; artist Elke Reva Sudin; fellow Shemspeed artists Y-Love, DeScribe, and Diwon; and Arrington de Dionysion of Old Time Relijun. Eprhyme said that "We wanted to recreate an Olympia basement party. We were representing underground music...literally underground. This is what hip hop looks and feels like outside the club."

== Track listing ==
A-Side

1. "Punklezmerap" – 2:11

B-Side

1. "Where The Heart Is" – 4:23

== Personnel ==
- Eprhyme – primary artist
- Smoke – producer
- Nomy Lamm – backing vocals
