= Dopestylevsky =

Studio album by Eprhyme
- Released: April 26, 2011
- Recorded: Brooklyn, New York; Olympia, Washington; Phoenix, Arizona
- Genre: Alternative hip hop
- Length: 41:36
- Label: K
- Producer: Smoke M2D6

Eprhyme albums chronology
Waywordwonderwill (2009)	Dopestylevsky (2011)	Lost Tapes and Found Sounds: 2006-2012 (2013)

Singles from Dopestylevsky
- 1. "Life Sentence" Released: November 7, 2011

Dopestylevsky is the second studio album by Jewish rapper Eprhyme, released on April 26, 2011 by K Records. It is the label's first hip-hop album in a decade, as K Records is typically known for punk and indie rock. A video for the album's lead single, "Life Sentence", was funded by Kickstarter and released on November 7, 2011.

== Reception ==
Professional ratings
Review scores
Source	Rating
PopMatters	5/10 stars
Tiny Mix Tapes	3/5 marks
Skyscraper	positive
The Forward	positive

Dopestylevsky received largely positive reviews. Jessica Monk of Tiny Mix Tapes called it "a solid album of consciousness-raising Jewish hip-hop, [although] not an exercise in genre-bending...we can believe the hype, and take it that this well-heeled genre has finally arrived chez K." John Book of Skyscraper magazine said, "Eprhyme is a nice breath of clarity that isn’t the exception to any specific rule, just hip-hop music at its best." Jay Michaelson of The Forward described it as "a more polished and more professional record" than his debut album, containing "less novelty, less preaching, but perhaps more potential to reach a wider audience with a Jewish flavor of hip-hop and rap."

In a negative review, Mike Schiller of PopMatters wrote, "Eprhyme demonstrates an impressive grasp of rhythm and rhyme, but his words are mere sounds that give us something to hold onto; they’re not meaningful, they’re not really about anything, they’re just there...Dopestylevsky is a perfectly pleasant hip-hop album that won’t get on anyone’s nerves [but not] the transcendental experience its author promises, nor does it even begin to live up to the literary figure referenced by its title."

== Track listing ==
No.	Title	Length
1.	"Grind Thoroughly"	3:25
2.	"Life Sentence"	4:03
3.	"Poppasong" (featuring Brad B and Foundation)	4:00
4.	"Blow Up the Block" (featuring DeScribe and Y-Love; prod. Electro Morocco)	4:04
5.	"Elements of Style" (featuring Labtekwon)	2:56
6.	"Smoke Break"	2:31
7.	"Let's Build" (featuring Compost)	3:32
8.	"Notes from the Underground" (featuring Xperience and Glimpse)	4:22
9.	"Lose Your Cool" (featuring AKA)	4:21
10.	"Divine by Design" (featuring Saints of Everyday Failures)	3:33
11.	"Better in the Dark" (featuring Darshan)	4:24
Total length:		41:36

- "Blow Up the Block" was previously released in single form by Shemspeed as "Boom Selecta", with an extra verse by Kosha Dillz.

== Personnel ==
- Smoke M2D6 – producer
- Foundation – producer ("Poppasong")
- AKA – featured artist
- Brad B – featured artist
- Skylar Blake – musician
- Drew Cohen – vocals
- Compost – featured artist
- Darshan (Eprhyme and Shir Yaakov) – featured artist
- DeScribe – featured artist
- Glimpse – featured artist
- Yosef Goldman – vocals
- El Goonie – cut
- Rolondo Guajardo – musician
- Ardas Hassler – musician
- Labtekwon – featured artist
- Daniel Landin – musician
- Tim Pollock – musician
- Poweena – vocals
- Tom Russell – musician
- Jeff Rygwelski – musician
- Saints of Everyday Failures (Eprhyme and D-Scribe) – featured artist
- Xperience – featured artist
- Y-Love – featured artist
