= Rinat Gutman =

Israeli Orthodox Jewish rapper, singer and songwriter

Rinat Gutman רינת גוטמן
- Born: 1980 (age 45–46); Nehalim, Israel
- Origin: Jerusalem, Israel
- Genres: Jewish hip hop, reggae, jazz
- Occupations: Rapper, singer, songwriter
- Instruments: Vocals, guitar, piano
- Years active: 2008–present

Rinat Gutman (Hebrew: רינת גוטמן; born 1980) is an Israeli Orthodox Jewish rapper, singer, and songwriter. One of the first religious female rappers in Israel, she has also performed in the United States, England, and India, and has appeared with artists like Y-Love, Kosha Dillz, and Roi Levi of Shotei Hanevuah.

== Early life ==
Gutman was born in 1980 and grew up on the moshav of Nehalim. She comes from a family of rabbis, most notably her grandfather, former rosh yeshiva and Knesset member Rabbi Yosef Ba-Gad.

Gutman's mother enrolled her in piano lessons when she was six, and she began composing melodies at a young age. Raised on Hasidic artists like Avraham Fried, she was exposed to secular music when her parents, working as emissaries for the Jewish Agency for Israel, moved the family to Canada while she was in middle school. She was introduced to hip hop through the soundtrack to the 1995 film Dangerous Minds. In her early twenties, Gutman drifted away from religious observance, although she later became a baalat teshuva.

== Career ==
Gutman began her career as a singer-songwriter playing jazz and folk before turning to hip hop and reggae. While living in New York City, she would perform at the local jazz clubs. After moving back to Israel, she began performing locally with some rappers who had moved there from the United States and wrote her first song about her cousin, who was killed in a terrorist attack during the Second Intifada, and performed it for her family.

In late 2009, while visiting England, Gutman collaborated with David Dan, a Jamaican Jewish reggae singer, on the song Agas ("Pear"), for which they also shot a music video. The song, with lyrics in Hebrew and English, describes a complicated romantic relationship.

In 2010, she performed at the sixth annual Jewlicious Festival alongside Matisyahu, Moshav, Rav Shmuel, Electro Morocco, and Kosha Dillz.

After a five-year hiatus, Gutman returned in 2015 with the song and video Shirat Ha'asavim Hashotim ("Song of the Weeds"). Written shortly after a local Orthodox rabbi had been accused of sexual harassment, the song uses dark humor to attack male authority figures taking advantage of women. The video features Gutman playing nine characters, including a rabbi, a policeman, a singer, a politician, and their respective victims. The song was produced by Hatikva 6 members Amit Sagie and Lior Shulman, the latter of whom also raps on the song, portraying the male authority figures.

In April 2020, Gutman posted a new song, Shirat HaLechem ("The Chametz Song"), to Facebook and Instagram, with lyrics reflecting the COVID-19 lockdown. In March 2021, Gutman shared a preview of an untitled new song on Instagram.

== Musical style ==
Gutman performs hip hop with elements of reggae and jazz. Her influences include Adele, Lauryn Hill, Aretha Franklin, Corinne Bailey Rae, and Tanya Stephens. Her lyrics often deal with her personal life and social protest, and occasionally incorporate quotes from scripture.
