= Darshan (band) =

American Jewish hip-hop group

- Origin: Brooklyn, New York, USA
- Genres: Jewish hip hop, alternative hip hop, folk rock, conscious hip hop
- Years active: 2008–present
- Labels: Shemspeed, Chant
- Members: Eprhyme; Shir Yaakov; Basya Schechter
- Website: darshanproject.com

Darshan is an American Jewish alternative hip hop group from Brooklyn, New York. Formed in 2008, the group primarily consists of rapper Eprhyme and singer-songwriters Shir Yaakov and Basya Schechter. Its debut album, Deeper and Higher, was released in 2015, followed by a second album, Raza, in 2017.

== History ==
Prior to meeting for the first time, Eprhyme had been a rapper in the Olympia music scene as part of the duo Saints of Everyday Failures, while Shir Yaakov Feit had informally freestyle rapped and beatboxed with the band Lev Yerushalayim as a yeshiva student in Israel. The two met in the summer of 2007 at Hazon's Isabella Freedman Jewish Retreat Center in Connecticut, where Epryhme was a fellow in the Adamah program and Feit was a residential employee. They connected musically while Eprhyme was driving Feit to the airport at the end of the session, and Feit subsequently provided vocals for Eprhyme's first solo album. The following summer session, they began writing and performing together.

The band's debut EP, Lishmah was released by Shemspeed Records on December 15, 2009, who subsequently re-released the record on January 5, 2010. The EP was produced by Shir Yaakov and engineered by Smoke M2D6 of Oldominion. A second EP, To Zion, was released on January 14, 2011. One of the EP's songs, a hip-hop version of "Chad Gadya", was issued as a single via Shemspeed in 2012.

The group's first full-length album, Deeper and Higher, was released on September 29, 2015. It was produced by Jamie Saft and featured accompaniment by him, Ben Perowsky, and Basya Schechter of Pharaoh's Daughter.

== Musical style ==
In addition to hip hop, Darshan's music also contains elements of folk rock and the minor key melodies of traditional Jewish music. An early press release by the band described their sound as "harmonizing Hebrew chant with hip hop, folk rock with electro-pop, love poetry with kabbalistic psychology" and cited The Postal Service, Björk, Beastie Boys, and The Beatles as reference points. Ezra Glinter of The Forward wrote, "Eprhyme's hard-driving lyrics are tempered and sweetened by Shir Yaakov’s more melody-driven sensibilities."

== Discography ==
=== Albums ===
Title	Details
Deeper and Higher	Released: September 29, 2015; Label: Self-released
Raza	Released: November 1, 2017; Label: Chant Records

=== Extended plays ===
Title	Details
Lishmah	Released: December 15, 2009; Re-released: January 5, 2010; Label: Shemspeed
To Zion	Released: January 14, 2011; Label: Shemspeed

=== Singles ===
Year	Title	Album
2012	"Chad Gadya"	To Zion
2015	"Know Return"	Deeper and Higher
2015	"Aleph Bass"	Non-album single
2017	"Remember the Future"	Deeper and Higher
2018	"Hapax Legomenon"	Raza

=== Music videos ===
Year	Song	Director
2015	"Know Return"	Ken Ross
2015	"Aleph Bass"	Brian Savelson, Abbey Luck
2017	"Remember the Future"	MorningAltars (Day Schildkret)
2018	"Hapax Legomenon"	Timslew, Eden Pearlstein
