= All Your Friend's Friends =

Studio album by Thee Xntrx
- Released: November 11, 2014
- Genre: Alternative hip hop
- Length: 1:06:45
- Label: K
- Producer: Thee Xntrx (Eprhyme and Smoke)

Singles from All Your Friend's Friends
- 1. "Welcome to Forever" Released: October 14, 2014; 2. "Jumpkick the Legs" Released: October 27, 2014; 3. "Good Bad Girl" Released: November 11, 2015; 4. "Work is the Principle" Released: November 15, 2014; 5. "Trial By Water" Released: February 3, 2015

All Your Friend's Friends is a hip hop album released by K Records on November 11, 2014. It was produced by Thee Xntrx (Eprhyme and Smoke of Oldominion, who also appear on the album) and pairs verses from various Pacific Northwest rappers with samples from older K Records artists, including punk and indie rock bands. Rappers on the compilation include The Chicharones, MG! The Visionary, Onry Ozzborn and JFK Ninjaface of Grayskul, Xperience, and Iame, while samples are taken from Mirah, The Microphones, and Jeremy Jay.

== Background and production ==
Rapper/producers Eprhyme and Smoke conceived of the project while collaborating on the former's solo album Dopestylevsky (2011). During that album's production, Eprhyme and Smoke began discussing Madlib's Shades of Blue and decided to attempt a similar project with K Records artists, getting permission from founder Calvin Johnson to access the label's archives. Artists sampled included Jeremy Jay, Ashley Eriksson, Mirah, Beat Happening, the Microphones, and Chain and the Gang.

== Release ==
The album was released on November 11, 2014. A music video for lead single "Jumpkick the Legs", released on October 27, was filmed at the Evergreen State College and features 11 MCs trading verses.

== Critical reception ==
Professional ratings
Review scores
| Source | Rating |
|---|---|
| AllMusic | 3.5/5 stars |
| Philadelphia City Paper | B |
| The Stranger | |
| New Noise Magazine | 4/5 stars |

All Your Friend's Friends received mixed to positive reviews. AllMusic's Mark Deming wrote, "What could have been a clumsy lo-fi variation on the Judgment Night original soundtrack instead turns out to be an interesting and genuinely satisfying collision of two distant but related independent cultures, and if you're interested in the more original sides of either indie rock or alternative rap, this is more than worth your attention." Sameer Rao of the Philadelphia City Paper said that the album "really should not be this good" and concluded, "Evocative snippets compel repeat listens on this respectable compilation." Larry Mizell, Jr. of The Stranger described it as "the first notable hiphop compilation in years" and said he would "love to see this release signal the return of the compilation, the crew album, the individual-ego-eschewing strength-in-numbers model." Tom Haugen of New Noise Magazine praised K Records for "continuing their tradition of exposing underappreciated outfits," saying "There isn’t a dud in the bunch."

== Track listing ==
1. "Cynic Syndrome" (Candidt, Zikki Carr, Onry Ozzborn) – 2:49
2. "Real Life Game" (The Chicharones) – 3:07
3. "Evolve Away" (Xperience) – 3:03
4. "Good Bad Girl" (Heddie Leone) – 2:59
5. "Find Your Shine" (Ang P, Poeina Suddartha, MG! The Visionary, Wildcard) – 4:16
6. "Where the Free People Go" (AKA) – 3:01
7. "Trial By Water" (Eprhyme, IAME) – 3:16
8. "Pizza Chef" (Free Whiskey) – 3:10
9. "3D Monocle" (Bishop, Gold, JFK, Smoke) – 3:25
10. "My Shady Gangster Uncle Kaiser" (Zikki Carr, Nyqwil, Xperience) – 4:27
11. "Dancefloor on the Warpath" (Smoke) – 3:44
12. "Nothing Grows in a Flood" (Barfly) – 2:33
13. "Blackfist Brokenfont" (Nyqwil, Silent Lambs Project) – 3:33
14. "Work Is the Principle" (Afrok, Ang P, Puget, MG! The Visionary) – 3:37
15. "We Never Look Up" (Gold, IAME, Miz) – 3:44
16. "Simplify Complex" (Saints of Everyday Failures, Alli Baker) – 3:56
17. "Ashen Embers" (Xperience) – 4:19
18. "Jumpkick the Legs" (Hashtronaut, Candidt, Zikki Carr, Jesus Chris, Heretic, DJ Luvva J, Miz, Nicatine, Ang P, Shellz Sck, Swamptiger, Xperience) – 3:55
19. "Welcome to Forever" (Simple, Smoke) – 3:51

== Personnel ==
- Eprhyme – executive producer, featured artist
- Smoke – producer, engineer, mixing, mastering, sampling, sequencing
- Gregory Welker – design, layout, artwork
- Alli Baker – violin ("Simplify Complex", "Welcome to Forever")
- Skyler Blake – guitar, EBow ("Real Life Game")
- Danny Haigh – piano ("Find Your Shine", "We Never Look Up")
- Thomas Deakin – trumpet ("Evolve Away")
