= Prodezra =

- Also known as: Prodezra Beats L'Shem Shamayim
- Born: Reuben Ezra Formey; 1981 (age 44–45)
- Origin: Savannah, Georgia, United States
- Genres: Jewish hip hop
- Occupations: Rapper, producer
- Years active: 2009-present

Reuben Ezra Formey (born 1981), known by his stage name Prodezra, is an American Jewish rapper and producer based in Savannah, Georgia. He has released two albums, Until When (2009) and Connection Revealed (2011). He is notable, along with Y-Love, Nissim, and Shyne, as one of several African-American Orthodox Jewish rappers.

== Early life ==
Formey was born in Minnesota to Sylvester and Patricia Formey before moving back to their hometown of Savannah, Georgia when he was three. He has an older sister, Roxanne. His grandfather, Henderson Formey Jr., was a Baptist minister and interim superintendent, and the first black leader of the Savannah-Chatham County Public Schools district. Sylvester Formey was introduced to Chabad by Rabbi Manis Friedman while attending college in the 1970s, and the family formally converted in 1993, shortly before Reuben's bar mitzvah.

He was interested in music from a young age, using his cousin's Casio keyboard to sample and mix his collection of pop, rock, and metal tapes. He was also influenced by his parents' love of jazz and classical before discovering hip hop.

He graduated from Alfred E. Beach High School in 1999 and attended Georgia Institute of Technology, where he continued to make beats. During this time, he began to fall away from his family's faith and "got involved in things I shouldn't have been involved in" until he "realized I was getting pulled out of these situations when other people weren't...I started to realize there was something to this." After finishing his degree in business management, he moved to Israel and studied in yeshiva at Mayanot Institute, which he would later dedicate a song on his second album to. There, he was encouraged by various rabbis and mentors to combine his music with his faith.

== Career ==
Formey produced the 2009 Shemspeed single "Change" featuring Y-Love and DeScribe, which later appeared on his debut album Until When and on Y-Love and DeScribe's joint album The Change EP. Until When also featured "The South Niggun", a collaboration with Hasidic singer Eli Lipsker.

In 2010, he released the online-only Proud to Be EP. He also filmed a video for the album's title track. That same year, he was featured on the Jewish website G-dcast with an animated music video for Rosh Hashanah, "Shofar Callin'".

He released his second album, Connection Revealed, in 2011. The album was promoted with the song "Tree of Life", a collaboration with fellow Mayanot alum Nosson Zand. The album also included "Money On Your Mind (G-d's Message)", a rebuttal to Snoop Dogg's "Gin and Juice". He performed with Y-Love at a benefit for victims of the 2010 Mount Carmel forest fire organized by UW–Madison students Jeremy Greenberg and Zac Miller, as well as at a public menorah lighting in Charleston, South Carolina, organized by Rabbi Yossi Refson and the College of Charleston. Several of his songs were played on WREK during a January 2012 edition of their Kosher Noise program.

In July 2015, he performed at the ModernTribe event "Twelve Tribes: Celebrating Jews of All Colors". In December, he performed on the court at Philips Arena for the Atlanta Hawks' Jewish Heritage Night event, which included a menorah lighting and preceded a game against the San Antonio Spurs.

In January 2015, he started a campaign on the crowdfunding website Jewcer to fund his third album, Face to Face. The campaign was successful and closed in February 2016. Later in the year his song "Flip" was included in The Forward's annual "Soundtrack of Our Spirit". In 2017, The Atlanta Jewish Times included him in their annual "40 Under 40" list.

In 2019, Formey released a new single and music video entitled "I.S.R.A.E.L." (an acronym for "I Shouldn't Rely on Anything Except the Lord) in collaboration with Breslov rabbi Rav Dror Moshe Cassouto and his website Emunah.com.

== Artistry ==
As a producer, Formey utilizes the Roland Fantom-X, Kontakt, and Screwlab to create beats.

Formey's lyrics draw from his Jewish faith, although he adds that "[A] lot of the songs have a universal message of positivity." He has cited Matisyahu as a role model for being an observant Jew in mainstream music. As a teenager, he was influenced by artists like Public Enemy, Phil Collins, Metallica, Bone Thugs-n-Harmony, and Outkast. He has also noted a Southern hip hop influence, saying, "I kind of stepped out there and took on certain issues in a Southern, Jewish, hip hop way...That's what I think is unique about my sound. You can hear the Southern sound, hear my voice in the music." He has listed among his top hip-hop albums Goodie Mob's Soul Food, Witchdoctor's A S.W.A.T. Healin' Ritual, Gang Starr's Moment of Truth, Outkast's ATLiens, and Nas' Illmatic. Writing for Tablet in 2016, Shais Rishon compared him to fellow black Orthodox rapper Hebro, saying their music "combines the conscious lyrics of classic hip-hop (Nas, Mos Def) with post-2010 synthetic sounds, put to mid-90’s style rhythms, which makes for an anachronistic yet uniquely pleasing aesthetic. What’s old is new again."

== Personal life ==
Formey lives with his family in the Toco Hills neighborhood of North Druid Hills, Georgia, having moved there from Alpharetta. He serves as gabbai at Chevra Ahavas Yisrael, the local Chabad synagogue.

== Discography ==
=== Albums ===
- Until When (2009)
- Connection Revealed (2011)
- Face to Face (TBA)

=== EPs ===
- Proud To Be EP (2010)

=== Singles ===
- "The Lamplighter" (2009)
- "Sound the Alarm" (feat. Nachman) (2009)
- "Let Me In" (feat. Nachman) (2009)
- "Tree of Life" (feat. Nosson Zand) (2010)
- "Where Are You? (24/7)" (2010)
- "Proud to Be" (2011)
- "On A Mission" (2012)
- "Don't Let Me Down" (2012)
- "Flip" (2016)
- "Egytian Cotton" (feat. Nachman) (2016)
- "Good Looking Out" (2016)
- "Smile" (2016)
- "He Say She Say" (2017)
- "I.S.R.A.E.L." (2019)

=== As producer ===
- Y-Love and DeScribe, "Change" (Shemspeed, 2009)
