= Jewish hip-hop =

Music genre

Jewish hip hop
- Stylistic origins: Jewish music, hip hop, klezmer, reggae, world music
- Cultural origins: Early 2000s, North America, Israel, and Europe
- Typical instruments: Rapping, turntabling, beatboxing, sampling

Other topics
- Jewish rock, Israeli hip hop

Jewish hip hop is a genre of hip hop music with thematic, stylistic, or cultural ties to Judaism and its musical traditions.

== Characteristics ==
Jewish hip hop artists have come from a wide variety of countries and cultures. Elements of reggae, klezmer, and other world music are often incorporated alongside traditional hip hop production techniques like cutting, scratching, sampling, looping, and beatboxing. Many Jewish rappers are also multilingual, rapping in English, Hebrew, Yiddish, Aramaic, Ladino, and other languages, depending on their background.

== History ==
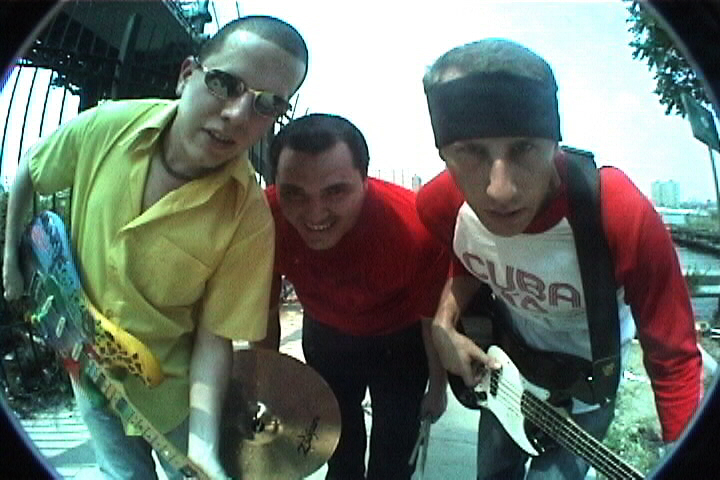
Hip Hop Hoodíos fused its members' Jewish and Latino identities and found support in Latino media. The videos for "Ocho Kandelikas" and "Gorrito Cosmico" entered rotation on MTV Español.

=== 1980s through 1990s ===
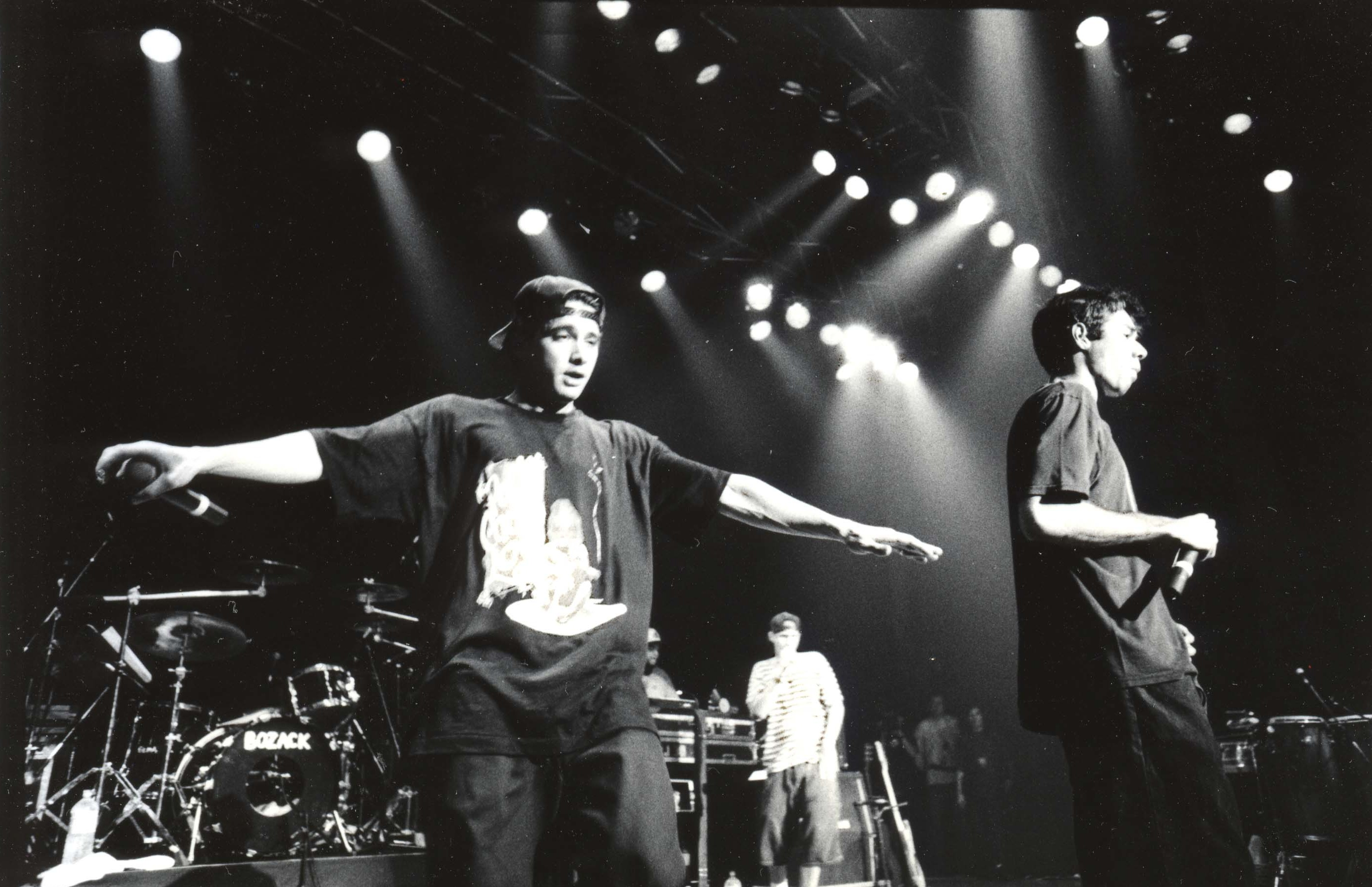
The Beastie Boys were one of the first hip hop groups to emphasize their Jewish identity.

From its commercial golden age in the 1980s and early 1990s, Jewish artists, producers, and executives played a significant role in the hip hop industry. These included N.W.A. manager Jerry Heller, producer Rick Rubin, and former Def Jam Recordings CEO Lyor Cohen, as well as majority-Jewish rap groups like 3rd Bass, The Whooliganz, The High & Mighty, and most prominently, the Beastie Boys. Josh Norek of Hip Hop Hoodíos later stated that "before Eminem, pretty much the only white rappers were Jewish." In Israel, Jewish rappers like Shabak Samech's Mook E, Hadag Nahash, Sagol 59, Subliminal, The Shadow, and SHI 360 helped pioneer the country's hip hop scene in the late 1990s and early 2000s. Despite this, few of these acts acknowledged their Jewish heritage in their music, with some exceptions being Hip Hop Hoodíos, the parody group 2 Live Jews, and Ruthless Records signees Blood of Abraham.

During this time, Jewish religious music occasionally incorporated hip hop, although largely for parody and children's music, such as Craig Taubman's "Chanukah Rap" and Shlock Rock's songs with rapper Etan G.

=== 2000s to present ===
The Jewish label JDub Records, founded in 2002, was one of the first to promote explicitly Jewish rap artists, with its roster including Sagol 59, Canadian klezmer-rapper Socalled, the Ethiopian-Israeli duo Axum, and the Middle Eastern-inflected group Balkan Beat Box, whose song "Hermetico" was later sampled for the international hit "Talk Dirty" by Jason Derulo and 2 Chainz. That same year, Hip Hop Hoodíos released their debut EP Raza Hoodía and found success in the Latino media, with several videos going into rotation on MTV Español and the group collaborating with members of Grammy-winning Latin bands like Ozomatli, Jaguares, and Santana.

In 2004, as part of his Celebrate series, Craig Taubman co-produced with music video director Jeremy Goldscheider the first Jewish hip-hop compilation album, Celebrate Hip Hop: Jewish Artists From Around the Globe. Contributing artists included Hip Hop Hoodíos, Sagol 59, Blood of Abraham, Socalled, Mook E, Etan G, and Remedy of the Wu-Tang Clan, as well as lesser known artists like the Russian group iSQUAD and the British groups Antithesis and Emunah.

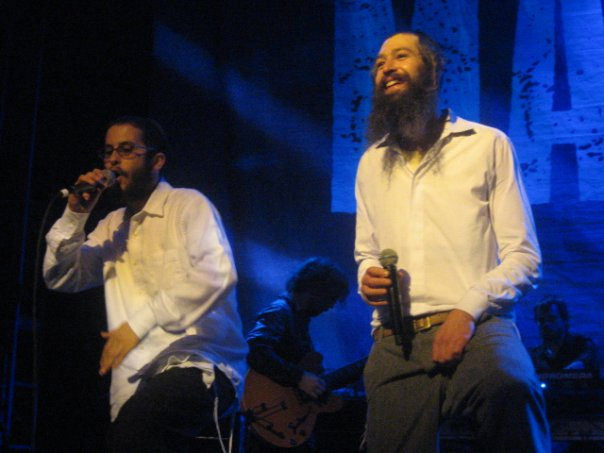
Hasidic rappers Matisyahu and Nosson Zand

In the mid-2000s, Hasidic reggae rap artist Matisyahu, who had been signed to JDub, experienced mainstream success; his albums Live at Stubb's (2005) and Youth (2006) were certified gold, while his single "King Without a Crown" became a Top 40 hit.

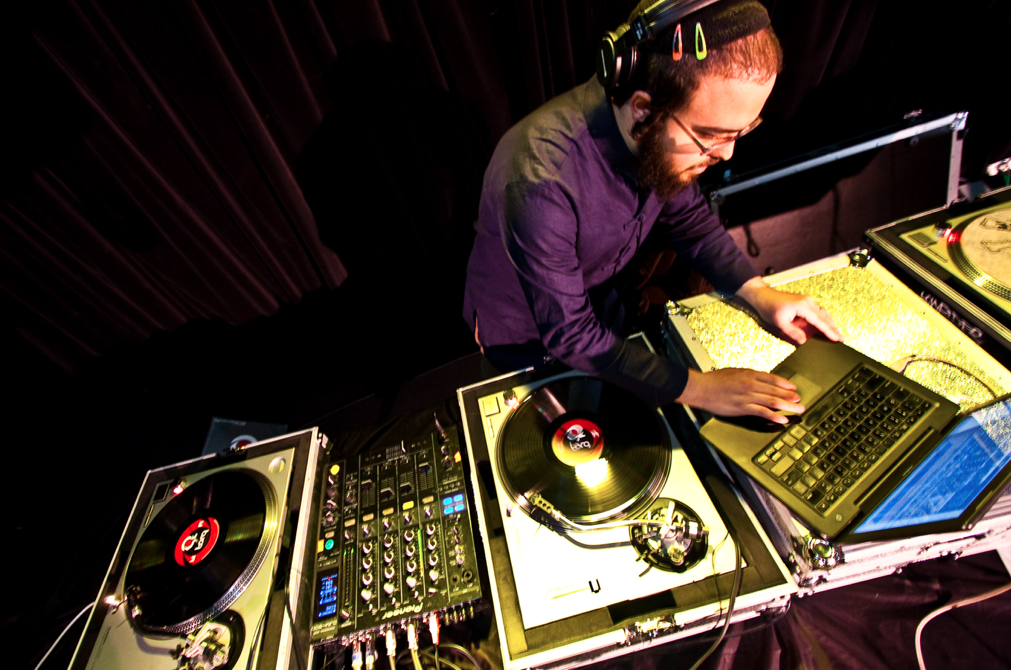
Diwon performing in Melbourne in 2009

Following Matisyahu's success, a number of Hasidic rappers emerged, including Y-Love, DeScribe, Nosson Zand, Eprhyme, and Nissim Black. Many of these were baalei teshuva, and many of them were promoted through American Yemenite producer Diwon's label Shemspeed Records, alongside non-Hasidic artists like rapper Kosha Dillz and Middle Eastern-inspired hip hop/electronic group Electro Morocco.

In Israel, a number of Orthodox rappers have become popular in both religious and secular circles. The rap rock band Shtar, formed at the Aish HaTorah yeshiva in Israel by Seattle rapper Ori Murray and British guitarist Brad Rubinstein, appeared on the reality singing competition HaKokhav HaBa performing Linkin Park's "In the End". Rinat Gutman, the country's first religious female rapper, gained attention in 2015 for her song "Shirat Ha'asavim Hashotim", a darkly humorous song addressing the sexual harassment committed by a number of Orthodox rabbis and other authority figures. Around the same time, America saw the arrival of Ephryme's alternative hip hop collective Darshan and the Ladino-language group Los Serenos Sefarad.

== Reception ==
The combination of Jewish music and hip hop has occasionally faced criticism, with rabbinic authorities condemning the use of secular styles and hip hop fans viewing it as a gimmick and inauthentic. Blogger Heshy Fried included "Chabad hip hop artists" on his list of "The Most Annoying Frum Jews" in 2011, saying "I have no idea what happened, but all of a sudden there are dozens of chabad BT hip hop artists, and I think the market is a bit saturated, don’t you think?"

=== Rabbinical perspectives ===
In 2007, two Haredi musicians from Bnei Brak, Chaim Shlomo Mayes and Dudi Kalish, released Rap in Yiddish, an album of Yiddish-language Jewish parody covers of American pop and rap songs by artists like 50 Cent. While the album was moderately successful, a group of Orthodox rabbis published a full-page ad in Hamodia that condemned the album for its "foreign" melodies "under Yiddish and Hasidic cover", calling for a boycott of the album and praising distributors who had already refused to sell it.

In a 2010 interview, rapper Yitz "Y-Love" Jordan recalled the Committee for Jewish Music, led by Rabbi Ephraim Luft, whose 2008 "Rules for Playing Kosher Music" included a prohibition on secular styles like rap music, even without lyrics. In response, Jordan stated, "Music can't be treif; the only thing that can be treif is the content in the music. There's no style of music which is automatically anti-Torah."

== Notable artists ==
- Nissim Black
- Blood Of Abraham
- Darshan
- DeScribe
- Electro Morocco
- Eprhyme
- Etan G
- Rinat Gutman
- Hebro
- Hip Hop Hoodíos
- Kosha Dillz
- Ari Lesser
- Los Serenos Sefarad
- Matisyahu
- Prodezra
- Moshe Reuven
- SHI 360
- Shtar
- Shyne
- Socalled
- Y-Love
- Nosson Zand
- BLP Kosher

== See also ==
- Jewish rock
- Jews and punk rock
- Jews in jazz
- Jewish influence in rhythm and blues
- Israeli hip hop

== Bibliography ==
- Siepmann, Philipp (2013). "'A Hip Hop Haggadah': The Transnational and Transcultural Space of Jewish Hip-Hop and Transnational Cultural Studies in the EFL Classroom". In Nitzsche, Sina A.; Grünzweig, Walter (eds.). Hip-Hop in Europe: Cultural Identities and Transnational Flows. Münster, Germany: LIT Verlag. ISBN 978-3-643-90413-3.
