= Hazon Food Conference =

Annual Jewish food systems event

Demographics of 2008 Conference participants
Age Bracket	# of People
< 10	59
10-19	34
20-29	148
30-39	131
40-49	79
50-59	74
60-69	31
70+	4
Total	560

The Hazon Food Conference is an annual meeting of farmers, culinary experts, global citizens, business, community and Jewish leaders to focus on contemporary food issues and exchange ideas on improving health and sustainability in communities throughout the world. The event is produced by the New York-based Jewish nonprofit organization, Hazon.

First held in 2006 at Isabella Freedman Jewish Retreat Center with 158 people in attendance, the Hazon Food Conference now takes place in late December in Northern California. In 2008 there were 560 attendees. The event consists of speeches, panel discussions, hands-on workshops, cooking demonstrations, educational and leisure activities. Previous Conference presenters and attendees include Dan Barber of Blue Hill Farm/Stone Barns Center for Food and Agriculture, Andrew Kimbrell from the Center for Food Safety, Rabbi Morris Allen of Hecksher Tzedek, and Rachel Biale of Progressive Jewish Alliance.

Programs at the Hazon Food Conference have included Grow Your Own & Do It Yourself Food, Jewish Tradition & Food: History & Culture, Food Policy and Creating a New Food System, Kosher Meat, Health and Nutrition, and Israel: Food & Agriculture.
