= Nigel Savage =

British environmental activist (born 1970)

- Born: 1970 (age 55–56)
- Occupation: Environmental activist
- Known for: Founder of Hazon
- Movement: Jewish environmental activism

Nigel Savage (born 1970) is a British environmental activist and founder of Jewish environmental nonprofit organisation Hazon. Beginning his career working in finance, in 2000 he founded Hazon and was CEO until its merger with the Pearlstone Retreat Center in 2021. He has been named twice as one of the Forward 50, and was a founder of Limmud NY. One of Savage's initiatives to help Jews live more sustainably include the Seal of Sustainability for Jewish institutions. He also named and catalysed the JOFEE (Jewish Outdoor, Food, Farming & Environmental Education) movement, including the JOFEE Fellows program.

== Early life (1970–2000) ==
Nigel Savage, the son of Shirley and Gerry Savage, was born and raised in the Sunnybank area of Bury, Greater Manchester. He went to cheder at Bury Hebrew Congregation, and was educated at King David Junior and Manchester Grammar School. Savage is Jewish.

Early in his career, Savage held positions as co-head of UK Equities at Govett and asset manager for NM Rothschild in London. He also executive produced a number of independent films including Leon the Pig Farmer (1992) and Stiff Upper Lips (1997).

Savage has a master's degree in history from Georgetown University and has studied at Pardes, Yakar, and Hebrew University.

== Hazon (2000–2021) ==
In 2000, Savage founded Hazon, translated as vision, and became CEO. As the inaugural event of Hazon, he organised the first Cross-USA Jewish Environmental Bike Ride to raise environmental awareness in the American Jewish community. Nigel was included in the Forward 50, an annual list of the most influential Jews in the United States, and Hazon was named one of 50 top faith-based environmental organisations by the Sierra Club in 2008. That year he also developed a shared non-profit space called Makom Hadash, Hebrew for 'New Place', which would cut overhead costs by sharing office space and fund raising staff.

In 2009, he led the Jewish delegation with Rabbi Yedidya Sinclair at the ARC and UN conference "Many Heavens, One Earth" in Britain. In 2013, Hazon partnered with Pearlstone and Isabella Freedman to organise the inaugural Jewish Intentional Communities Conference. That year, Hazon merged with the Isabella Freedman Jewish Retreat Center, and Savage became CEO of the merged organisation. Savage coined the phrase "Jewish Food Movement" as an umbrella term for the various people and projects in the field; at the time typing “Jewish food movement” in quotes into Google and receiving zero search results but by 2014 this search term yielded 81,300 hits.

The Jewish Theological Seminary gave him an honorary doctorate in 2015. In 2017, The Times of Israel highlighted Savage as one of 12 Jews who are "leading the green movement". In 2020, Savage, representing Hazon, blew the shofar for the 50th anniversary of Earth Day, with #SoundTheCall listed as an event by Earth Day Network. In 2021, Hazon merged with the Pearlstone Retreat Center, and Savage stepped down as CEO to spend shmita in Israel. (Note: Shmita relates to the biblical Sabbatical year) Savage noted the during his time at Hazon, "If there’s a structural failure that I’m most concerned by, it’s about not building an endowment". That year, he delivered the dvar torah at Congregation B’nai Israel in Millburn. In 2022, Savage was the keynote speaker at the 2022 Cape SAJBD’s AGM and Conference entitled Community for Change: Creating a Sustainable Environment. In response to Savage's keynote speech, Cape Jewish Chronicle wrote that he "presented a powerful address to galvanise our community to becoming change-makers in the fight against climate change". In 2022, he was also honoured as an alumnus of the Pardes Institute of Jewish Studies.

== Philosophical views ==
Savage has stated many positions on the Jewish food movement. To The Times of Israel he commented, "the Jewish community has always cared about social justice — and we've always loved food", and believes that the term food justice revolves around "health, sustainability, local food, organic food, traditional issues around kashrut", and universal access to nutritional food. Savage argues that the Torah is a dedication to food and food production because "all the holidays focus around Earth-based, agriculture-based events". According to The Forward, Savage has brought the obscure practice of shmita into the 21st century through his work at Hazon.

== Published works ==
- 2011 - A Wild Faith: Jewish Ways into Wilderness, Wilderness Ways into Judaism ISBN 978-1681629681, with Rabbi Mike Comins.
- 2011 - The Sacred Table: Creating a Jewish Food Ethic, wrote preface
- 2013 - Jewish Megatrends: Charting the Course of the American Jewish Future ISBN 1683361458, one of many contributors.
