= Alsarah =

Sudanese-American singer, songwriter, and ethnomusicologist

Alsarah السارة
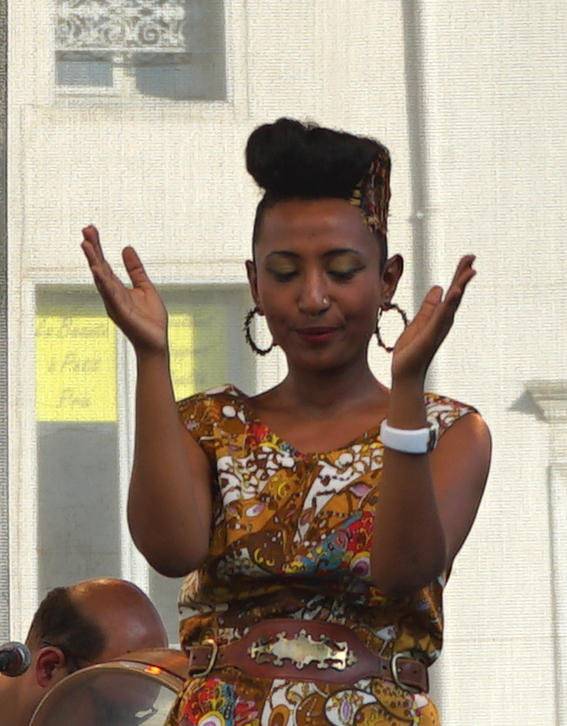
- Alsarah in 2015

Background information
- Born: Sarah Mohamed Abunama-Elgadi; Khartoum, Sudan
- Origin: Brooklyn, New York
- Genres: World music, pop, soul, afrobeat
- Years active: 2004–present
- Member of: Alsarah & the Nubatones
- Formerly of: The Nile Project
- Website: www.alsarah.com

Sarah Mohamed Abunama-Elgadi, known professionally as Alsarah (Arabic: السارة), is a Sudanese-American singer, songwriter, and ethnomusicologist. She is the leader of the group Alsarah & the Nubatones, and has performed with other groups such as The Nile Project and The Epichorus. Her stage name is a combination of her given name with the Arabic definite article.

== Early life ==
Alsarah was born in Khartoum, Sudan. Both her parents are human-rights activists. When she was eight, her family fled the country during the 1989 coup by future president Omar al-Bashir to avoid being killed as dissidents. They then lived in Taez, Yemen, before fleeing again due to the country's 1994 civil war. They subsequently arrived in the United States claiming political asylum and settled in Boston. During this turbulent period, she often found solace in music, listening to bootleg recordings in Yemen and taking casual piano lessons from a family friend.

In the United States, she sang in several world music choirs and attended high school at Pioneer Valley Performing Arts Charter Public School. She studied ethnomusicology at Wesleyan University, where she wrote her senior thesis on Sudanese Zār music and graduated in 2004 with a bachelor's degree.

== Career ==
After graduating in 2004, she moved to New York City and began singing professionally in Arabic, supporting herself with various odd jobs. She was the singer for the Zanzibari band Sound of Tarab.

=== Alsarah & the Nubatones ===
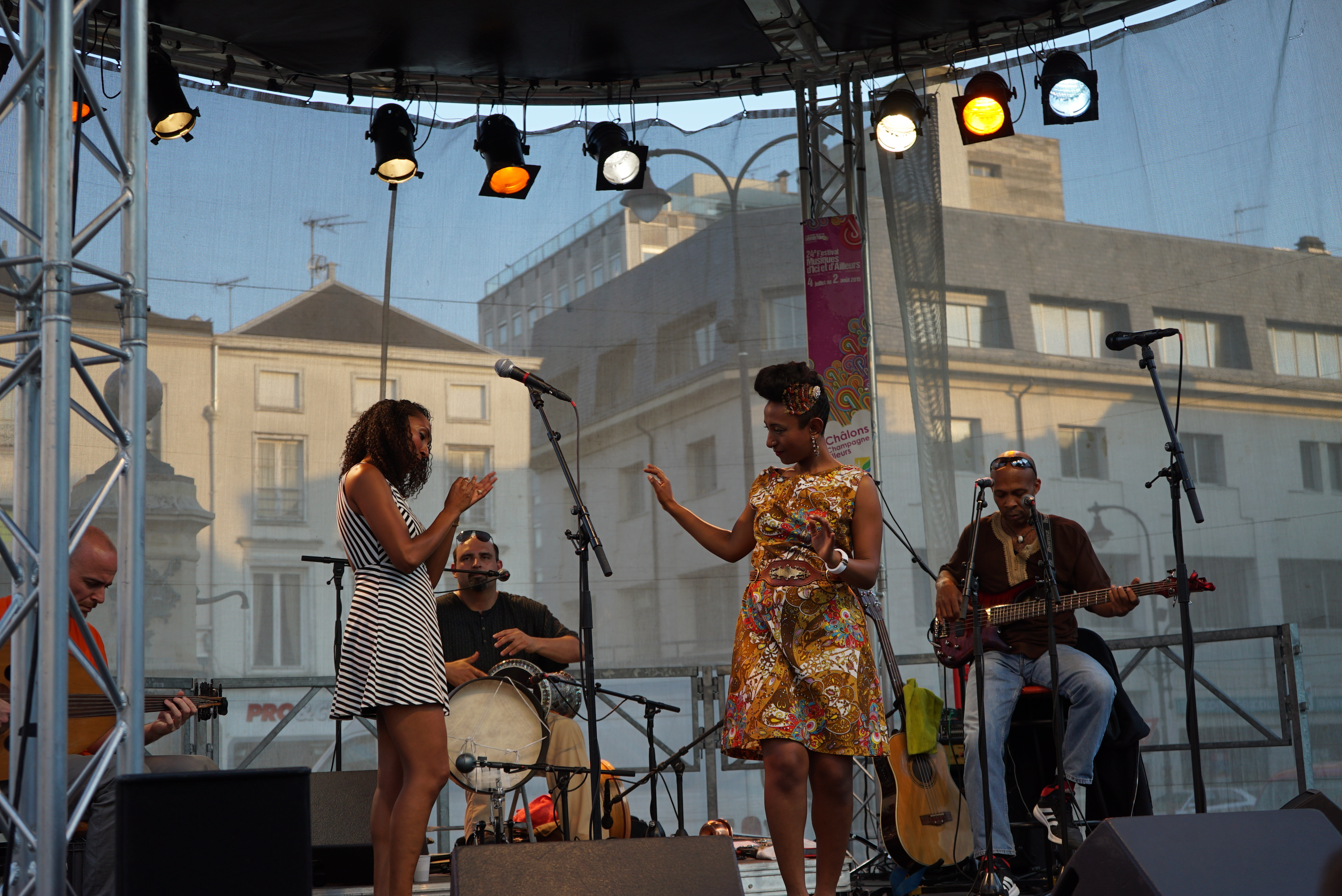
Alsarah & the Nubatones in 2015.

Alsarah formed Alsarah and the Nubatones in 2010, with her sister, Nahid, on backing vocals, bassist Mawuena Kodjovi, oudist Luthier Haig Manoukian (replaced by Brandon Terzic after his death), and percussionist Rami El-Aasser of the Cafe Antarsia Ensemble.

They released their debut recording, Soukura EP, in 2014, followed by the full-length album Silt later that year. The song "Soukura", which appears on both albums, received a music video that was released on March 25, 2014. They have toured Hungary, Portugal, France, the United Arab Emirates, Morocco, Egypt, Lebanon, Sweden, and Lithuania. A second album, Manara, was released in 2016, and following a hiatus, a third album entitled Seasons of the Road was released in February 2025.

=== Other work ===
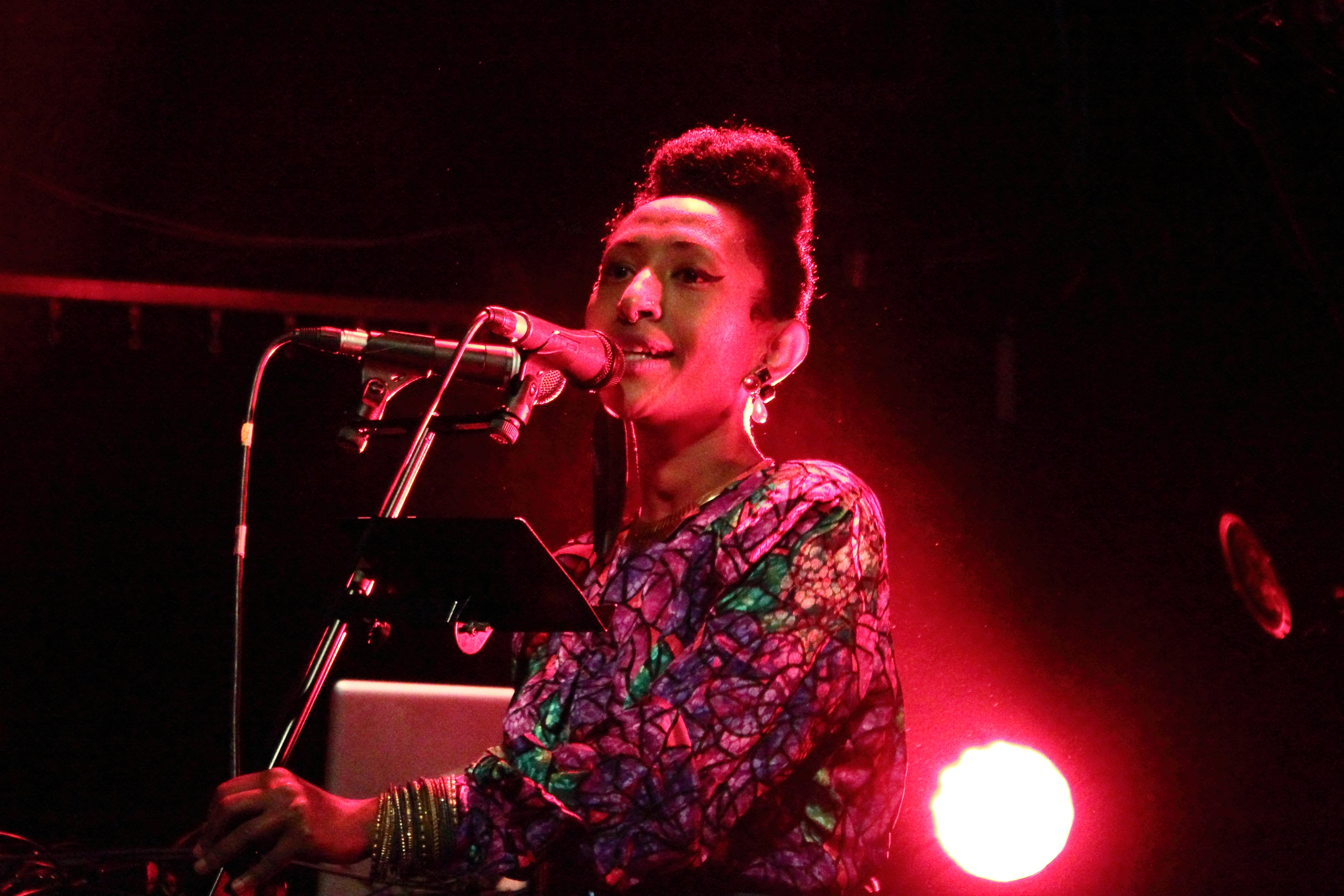
Alsarah in Poitiers, France in 2014.

In 2010, she released a music video called "Vote!", featuring rapper Oddisee, to encourage Sudanese citizens to vote in the country's upcoming election. She collaborated with American oudist and rabbinical student Zach Fredman on the album One Bead (2012), the debut from his group The Epichorus.

In 2013, she released the album Al Jawal, a collaboration with French producer Débruit, released through Soundway Records. She performed at Waayaha Cusub's Reconciliation Music Festival, the first music festival in Mogadishu in 20 years. She contributed the song "Salaam Nubia" to Mina Girgis and Meklit Hadero's Nile Project album Aswan, which was recorded during a live performance in Aswan, Egypt.

She was featured in the 2014 documentary Beats of the Antonov, which won the People's Choice Award for Best Documentary at the 2014 Toronto International Film Festival.

In the summer of 2025, she performed at the Museum of Contemporary African Diasporan Arts in Brooklyn, as well as a duet at Georgetown University in Qatar as part of a series on Sudan. She has also collaborated with Sudanese visual artist Ahmed Umar on works displayed at the Venice Biennale; organized emergency funding for grassroots organizations in Sudan via her non-profit, Sunduq al-Sudan; and facilitated music residencies for displaced Sudanese musicians in Uganda.

== Artistry ==
Alsarah has listed Hamza El Din and Abd El Gadir Salim among her favorite Nubian and Sudanese artists. During her teenage years in the US, she was influenced by Americana, early blues, and Appalachian and Gullah music. She has also mentioned Lebanese singer Fairuz, American folksinger Joan Baez, and Yemeni and Balkan music as part of her musical development, and has named artists including Toshi Reagon, Bernice Johnson Reagon, June Millington, and Bi Kidude as inspirations. Despite her multicultural influences, she has rejected being labeled as "world music" or "traditional music", instead describing her sound as "soul music from East Africa" and "East African retro-pop".

== Discography ==
=== Solo albums ===
- Aljawal ("Eternal Traveler") (2013, Soundway) (with Débruit)

=== With Alsarah & the Nubatones ===
- Soukura EP (2014, Wonderwheel)
- Silt (2014, Wonderwheel Recordings)
- Manara ("The Lighthouse") (2016, Wonderwheel)
- Seasons of the Road (2025)

==== Music videos ====
- "Soukura" (2014)
- "Habibi Taal" (2014)
- "Ya Watan" (2016)

=== With The Epichorus ===
- One Bead (2012)

=== Other credits ===
- The Nile Project, Aswan (2013) – featured artist ("Salaam Nubia")
- Captain Planet, Esperanto Slang (2014) – featured artist ("Safaru")
- Dexter Story, Wondem (2015) – composer, featured artist ("Without an Address")
