= Electro Morocco =

Israeli-American electronic music group from 2007 to 2012

- Origin: Brooklyn, New York
- Genres: World music, electronic, rock
- Years active: 2007–2012 (inactive)
- Labels: Shemspeed, Blue Jay Way
- Members: Roy Gurel; Assaf Spector; Yula Beeri; Yuval Lion; Brian Wolf
- Past members: Shlomi Lavie
- Website: electromorocco.wordpress.com

Electro Morocco were an Israeli American electronic music band from Brooklyn, New York. Formed in 2007 by members of Nanuchka, they released two EPs, Electro Morocco (2008) and Low Ride (2010) and were featured on the Shemspeed compilation album Sephardic Music Festival Vol. 1 (2010). They remixed and produced songs for Y-Love, DeScribe, and Eprhyme, and were noted for their unusual blend of electronic, rock, and Middle Eastern music.

== History ==
Electro Morocco was formed in 2007 in Brooklyn, New York. Founding members Yula Beeri (previously of The World/Inferno Friendship Society and Star Fucking Hipsters), Roy Gurel, Shlomi Lavie, and Assaf Spector had previously been in the rock band Nanuchka together. The band's debut EP, Electro Morocco, was released by Shemspeed on April 22, 2008. Later that year, Lavie left the group and joined the band Marcy Playground.

In January 2009, the band performed at the 92nd Street Y as part of the Oyhoo Jewish Music Festival alongside Dov Rosenblatt, Y-Love, and Diwon. In December, they joined Shemspeed's fifth annual Sephardic Music Festival alongside Pharaoh's Daughter, Yair Dalal, Sarah Aroeste, and Smadar Levi.

In early 2010, they appeared at the Boston Jewish Music Festival alongside Flory Jagoda, Ruth Dolores Weiss, Osvaldo Golijov, Golem, and the Klezmer Conservatory Band. They also contributed their song "Joe Pill" to the Shemspeed compilation Sephardic Music Festival Vol. 1, and released a second EP, Low Ride, accompanied by the single "Sweetly Down".

The group has been inactive since 2012, with the members pursuing various other projects.

== Musical style ==
Electro Morocco's style of electronic music combined elements of hard rock, hip hop, pop, and Middle Eastern music, earning comparisons to Sri Lankan rapper M.I.A. as well as hip-hop groups Black Eyed Peas and Far East Movement.

== Discography ==
EPs

- Electro Morocco EP (April 22, 2008; Shemspeed/Blue Jay Way)
- Low Ride EP (March 24, 2010; Shemspeed/Blue Jay Way)

Music videos

- "Joe Pill" (2008; Electro Morocco EP)
- "Sweetly Down" (2010; Low Ride EP)

Production credits

- Shemspeed MCs vs. Electro Morocco – "Boom Selecta" (feat. Y-Love, DeScribe, Eprhyme, and Kosha Dillz) (2010; Shemspeed)
- Eprhyme – "Blow Up the Block" (feat. Y-Love and DeScribe) (2011; Dopestylevsky; K)

Remixes

- Y-Love and DeScribe – "Make It" (Electro Morocco remix) (2009; The Change EP; Shemspeed)
- Matisyahu – "One Day" (Electro Morocco remix) (2010; Shemspeed)
- DeScribe – "Modern Day Moses" (Electro Morocco remix feat. Shmoolik (2010; Harmony EP; Shemspeed)
- Electro Morocco – "Joe Pill" (remix) (2010)
- Electro Morocco – "Set" (remix) (2010)
- Y-Love – "The Takeover" (Electro Morocco remix feat.Andy Milonakis and TJ Di Hitmaker) (2012; Shemspeed)

Compilation appearances

- Sephardic Music Festival Vol. 1 – "Joe Pill" (2010; Shemspeed)
