= Jewish Farm School =

American educational nonprofit

The Jewish Farm School (JFS) was an environmental education non-profit founded by Nati Passow, Simcha Schwartz, Robert Friedman, Rachel Tali Kaplan and Shemariah Blum-Evitts in 2005. It closed in 2019. The organization's mission was to "practice and promote sustainable agriculture and to support food systems rooted in justice and Jewish traditions." The school educated participants through farm-based service learning experiences, practical skills trainings, Jewish text study, and outreach and consulting. JFS ran a variety of sustainability-themed and farm-based programs with the help of Rabbi and Director of Programs Jacob Fine. It also oversaw the Farm at Eden Village Camp in Putnam Valley, New York.

== Background ==
Since its formation in 2005, Jewish Farm School has run over fifty different programs, reaching over 4,800 children, college students and adults. JFS ran Alternative Break (AB) trips with college students on farms around the country, urban sustainability workshops in Philadelphia, and oversaw the Farm at Eden Village, a two-acre educational farm on the grounds of Eden Village Camp, a new Jewish summer camp outside of New York City. Through JFS Cooperative Design, JFS consults with synagogues, JCCs and private landowners on educational and public interest Jewish farming and gardening projects.

== Programs ==
Jewish Farm School ran a variety of year-round events and workshops. Past programs at the Farm at Eden Village include Bee Keeping 101, Herbal Medicine, Natural Building, and Maple Sugaring. Urban Eden took place at urban community farms in Brooklyn and Manhattan.

Other initiatives included Anafim: Sustainable Food and Farming Internship for High School Seniors, JFS Seminar in Organic Agriculture and Educational Gardening and Organic Farming Alternative Break service learning trips for college students.

== Curriculum ==
Alumot: A Jewish Gardening Project is a resource manual for educators to start their own garden program.

Jewish Food Rules: Principles of a Contemporary Food Ethic provides a contemporary perspective on what it means to "eat Jewish". The curriculum explored Jewish texts and traditions that explain laws and values on workers rights, animal rights, and agricultural practices.

== Staff ==
Nati Passow, Co-founder & Executive Director, is a writer, carpenter and educator living in Philadelphia.

Simcha Schwartz, Co-founder & Associate Director, is originally from Chicago and graduated with a degree in Sociology from the University of Kansas. In 2004, working for Hazon, Simcha coordinated the NY Jewish Enviro

Rabbi Jacob Fine, Rabbi and Director of Programs, a graduate of Vassar College, was ordained by the Ziegler School of Rabbinic Studies.

== Partners ==
Hazon, a New York-based Jewish environmental organization, was Jewish Farm School's fiscal sponsor. JFS operated autonomously but maintained nonprofit status under the umbrella of Hazon.

In June 2010, Nati Passow was selected to the Joshua Venture Group Fellowship for Jewish Social Entrepreneurs for his work with the Jewish Farm School. In 2010, JFS was listed in the Slingshot guide as one of the 50 most innovative Jewish organizations in North America.

JFS was supported by several foundations and organizations, including Hazon, Repair the World, UJA-Federation of New York, Bikkurim, the Joshua Venture Group, the Natan Fund, the Joyce and Irving Goldman Foundation, and the Lisa and Maury Friedman Foundation.

Eden Village Camp partnered with JFS to run year-round farm-based, Jewish educational programs for both children and adults.

JFS has been a resident of Bikkurim: An Incubator of New Jewish Ideas since July 2009, which provides office space and professional guidance to pioneering Jewish organizations.

JFS ran a track on organic farming and gardening for the annual Teva Seminar for Jewish Environmental Education.

== Additional References ==
- CBS, June 12, 2011, Stewards of the Earth
- The Forward, June 2, 2011, Row by Row: Growing a School Garden Movement
- USA Today, April 18, 2011, At Passover and All Year, Creative Jews Update Traditions
- The Forward, April 22, 2011, Beyond Bal Tashchit
- eJewish Philanthropy, April 7, 2011, The Power of Narrative to Drive Change
- New Voices, April 3, 2011, Jews and the Environment
- Jewcy, March 31, 2011, Jews on a Farm
- San Diego Jewish World, February 18, 2011, Students Studying Ethical Farming to Converge on SDJA
