= Priya Darshini =

Indian-American singer, runner (born 1983)

- Born: December 25, 1983 (age 42); Chennai, India
- Occupations: Singer, actress, composer, sprinter, entrepreneur
- Years active: 2005–present
- Label: Chesky Records
- Website: priyadarshini.com

Priya Darshini (born 25 December 1983) is an Indian-American singer, composer, actress, professional sprinter, and entrepreneur based in Brooklyn, New York. She is known for musical recordings in both Bollywood and Western productions, her role in the 2014 American film The Letters, and becoming the first Indian woman to complete the 100-mile Himalayan Ultra Marathon. She is married to hammered dulcimer artist Max ZT.

== Music career ==
Growing up in Mumbai, India, Darshini began musical studies with Bombay Lakshmi Rajagopalan at age nine.

In 2008, Darshini joined Roy “Futureman” Wooten's Black Mozart Ensemble, performing "a dream-like fusion of jazz, hip-hop, blues, bluegrass and classical music" throughout India and the United States.

In 2017 Darshini became Artistic Director of Brooklyn Raga Massive and co-led Women's Raga Massive, performing with both. She also co-produced Out of the Woods, an annual monthly festival dedicated to amplifying the works of female-identified artists.

Darshini signed with Chesky Records, releasing a single, Home, in March 2020, in advance of release of her first album, Periphery. This album was nominated for a Grammy Award for Best New Age Album for the 63rd annual Grammy Awards.

Recordings

- Dil Di Nazar from Maine Pyar Kyun Kiya
- Ek Pal Ki Zindagi Hai from D Company
- Dhoonde Dil from Mukhbir directed by Mani Shankar
- Awaaz Koi from Darling
- Grand Tapestry - Grand Tapestry (2016)
- Karsh Kale - Following Sunlight (2016)
- House of Waters - House of Waters - GroundUP Music (2016)
- Pearl Jam - "Obey The Law of the Heart" (from Basmati Blues) (2017)
- The Epichorus - Najara (2018)
- Eligh - Last House on the Block (2018)
- Periphery (2020; debut solo album)
- House of Waters - On Becoming - GroundUP Music (2023), 8eme track, "The Wall".

== Sports ==
In 2007, at age twenty-three, Darshini became the first and youngest Indian woman to run the 100-mile Himalayan Ultra Marathon on the border of India and Nepal, at elevations ranging from 6000 ft to 12000 ft. The experience led her to found an adventure racing company, The WindChasers, in 2011, organizing ultra marathons across India, including two named to Conde Nast's 2016 list of Most Scenic Marathons of India, and 2019 list of Beautiful Marathons in India.

== Film and acting career ==
After studying film-making and acting at the New York Film Academy in 2005, Darshini started working on both sides of the camera for Independent films in India. She acted in the 2014 Hollywood film The Letters, a film where she acted in a supporting role opposite Juliet Stevenson, Rutger Hauer, and Max Von Sydow. In 2017, Darshini got involved in theater with a performance of It Can Happen Here, a play directed by Judith Sloan.
