= Shir Meira Feit =

American liturgist, singer-songwriter, composer

- Also known as: Shir Yaakov
- Born: Sam Benjamin Feinstein-Feit; Manhattan, New York
- Origin: Hudson Valley, New York
- Genres: Jewish music, folk, electronic, hip hop
- Occupations: Rabbi, composer, liturgist, singer, educator, prayer leader, graphic designer
- Instruments: Vocals, guitar
- Years active: 2005–present
- Website: shirmeira.com

Shir Meira Feit (née Sam Benjamin Feinstein-Feit and formerly known as Shir Yaakov) is an American rabbi, composer, liturgist, singer-songwriter, spiritual counselor, and graphic designer. Feit is genderqueer. As a musician, they have recorded several albums both solo and with the groups Darshan and The Epichorus. In their spiritual career, Feit has been a figure in the Jewish Renewal movement, having served the congregations Kol Hai, Kol Zimrah, and Romemu and served as ritual consultant at Eden Village Camp and visiting faculty at the Academy for Jewish Religion and the Jewish Theological Seminary. They are also a member of the Zen Peacemaker order.

== Early life ==
Feit was raised in Manhattan by a secular Jewish family. They attended the Abraham Joshua Heschel School beginning in third grade when their mother got a job there. Their family were members of the B'nai Jeshurun synagogue. As a child, Feit took piano and guitar lessons and taught themselves music, including transcription and composition. In high school, they were influenced musically by Nirvana's Kurt Cobain.

After graduating high school, Feit worked in photography, graphic and web design. They started becoming more religious in their early 20s, influenced by Sefer Yetzirah and the works of Rabbi Zalman Schachter-Shalomi, the founder of the Jewish Renewal movement.

Feit moved to Jerusalem's Nachlaot neighborhood in 2005 to study in yeshiva. There, Feit and their friends created an informal band called Lev Yerushalayim, with whom they would beatbox and freestyle rap at late-night concerts outside Yeshivat Simchat Shlomo.

== Music career ==
=== Solo albums ===
Feit began their music career with the EP Shir (2008), followed by their debut album Zeh (2009). They have since released two more solo albums, Az (2010) and Lah (2015). Their song "Broken Hearted" won The Forward's 2016 Soundtrack of Our Spirit competition.

=== Darshan ===
In 2008, while working at the Isabella Freedman Jewish Retreat Center, Feit met the Jewish rapper Eprhyme (Eden Pearlstein). After playing their respective music for each other, Eprhyme invited Feit to sing on their debut album Waywordwonderwill, and the two later formed the duo Darshan. Their debut EP Lishmah was released in 2010, followed by a full-length album, Deeper and Higher, in 2015.

=== Other ===
Feit has collaborated with the multifaith world music band The Epichorus, singing on their 2012 debut album One Bead.

== Other activities ==
Feit is one of the founding members of Kol Zimrah, an independent minyan and chavurah on the Upper West Side. They have also founded and worked with the Jewish Renewal congregations Kol Hai and Romemu, and has served as a ritual consultant at Eden Village Camp and visiting faculty at the Academy for Jewish Religion. They were a participant and later a facilitator of Rōshi Bernie Glassman's "Bearing Witness" retreat at Auschwitz. In April 2016, Feit was one of around 100 Jewish leaders, including Rabbis Rachel Barenblat, Saul Berman, and Shefa Gold, to sign a petition of denouncement against spiritual guru Marc Gafni, in light of allegations of sexual misconduct against Gafni.

== Personal life ==
As of 2023, Feit "describe[d] themself as genderqueer or gender-fluid" and uses they/them pronouns. They live in the Hudson Valley with their partner and three children.

== Discography ==
=== Solo recordings ===
- Shir EP ("Song") (2008)
- Zeh ("This") (2009)
- Az ("Then") (2010)
- Lah ("To Her") (2015)

=== With Darshan ===
- Lishmah EP (2010; Shemspeed)
- Deeper and Higher (2015)

=== With The Epichorus ===
- One Bead (2012)
- Precession (2016)

=== Other ===
- Blanket Statementstein, Blanket Statementstein (2008) – vocals ("Never Stress")
- Eprhyme, Waywordwonderwill (2009) – vocals ("Tikkun Adam" and "Fixing Midnight")
- Eprhyme, Dopestylevsky (2011) – vocals (with Darshan) ("Better in the Dark")
