= The Epichorus =

American Jewish-Arabic world music group

- Origin: Brooklyn, New York
- Genres: World; folk; Jewish; Middle Eastern
- Years active: 2011–present
- Members: Zach Fredman; See below
- Website: theepichorus.com

The Epichorus is an American world music ensemble based in Brooklyn, New York. Led by oudist Rabbi Zach Fredman, the group was formed in 2011 and released their debut album, One Bead, in 2012. They perform in a variety of musical traditions, primarily Jewish, Arabic, and Middle Eastern, with collaborators that have at times included Sudanese vocalist Alsarah, Indian-American singer Priya Darshini, Lebanese musician Bassam Saba, and American Jewish artists Shir Yaakov and Basya Schechter. In 2013, Time magazine listed the group among "10 Stars of the New Jewish Music", alongside acts including Rick Recht, Joshua Nelson, The Maccabeats, and Dan Nichols.

The group's name is a musical pun on "epikoros", a Jewish term for "heretic".

== History ==
The Epichorus was founded in 2011 by musician and Rabbi Zach Fredman, who had begun playing oud music inspired by Hamza El Din and wanted to explore it in a modern context. He met singer-songwriter Shir Yaakov at a jam session; other founding members included violinist Megan Gould, flautist Hadar Noiberg, and bassist Daniel Ori. Seeking a Sudanese vocalist after hearing a recording of El Din performing with a Sudanese women's chorus, Fredman discovered singer-songwriter and ethnomusicologist Alsarah through YouTube and recruited her to join the project. The name "Epichorus" is a play on "epikoros", the Jewish term for a heretic, as Fredman had often felt "a little bit too outside for the insiders and a little bit too inside for the outsiders". The group's debut album, One Bead, named from Song of Songs 4:9, was produced by Fredman and released on September 7, 2012. To celebrate the album's release, the Epichorus performed at the 92nd Street Y the following April.

The group performed at the Washington Jewish Music Festival in May 2015. 2016 saw the group release the EP Precession and the double album L'Oud and the Abstract Truth, the latter a collaboration with poet Rabbi James Stone Goodman in the Arabic maqam format; among the album's guest musicians was Basya Schechter on kanjira. In August 2017, they gave a Motza'ei Shabbat concert at the historic Eldridge Street Synagogue.

The Epichorus' second full-length album, Najara, was released on February 2, 2018. The album was named for 16th-century poet and Gazan rabbi Israel ben Moses Najara, who set religious poetry to folk melodies heard in taverns, and saw the group begin to collaborate with Indian vocalist Priya Darshini, who was introduced to Fredman by her partner Max ZT, the group's hammered dulcimer player. In 2020, the group released two singles, "Modeh Ani" and "Shachar", as well as the live album Yamim Noraim 5781 (Live at Zoomland), recorded at Dreamland Recording Studios and broadcast live over Zoom during the High Holidays of 2020. The album included a cover of Leonard Cohen's "Come Healing" and "For the Sky to Fill with Cranes", composed and performed by Sxip Shirey.

In March 2021, the group released Solitudes, a Passover Seder-themed album of solo pieces from each musician. Later in the year, they performed High Holidays services at First Unitarian Church of Brooklyn to launch Fredman's Temenos Center for Art and Spirit and at Race Brook Lodge in Sheffield, Massachusetts. In December they released Ten at Dreamland; Healing and Lineage, their first instrumental album, which had been recorded live with ten musicians at Dreamland in the summer of 2018.

== Musical style ==
The Epichorus draws from a variety of musical traditions, with bandleader Zach Fredman remarking that the group is an experiment in "holding together dissonance". The group's retro-folk sound primarily draws from Jewish, Arabic, and Middle Eastern music, incorporating Middle Eastern modes and East and North African instruments with a repertoire that includes Syrian and Iraqi Jewish religious songs, Sudanese love songs, Sufi music, and Egyptian music from the 1930s and 1960s. The group also began incorporating Indian influences with the addition of Priya Darshini, who sang in Urdu, Hindi, Tamil, Braj Bhasha, and Punjabi as well as the group's more common Hebrew. Lyrics are often taken from religious texts like the Torah, from traditional songs, and from poetry spanning from the 2nd to 14th centuries. Fredman was heavily influenced by Sudanese oudist Hamza El Din, as well as Malian vocalists Khaira Arby and Oumou Sangaré, American artists like Aretha Franklin and the Grateful Dead, and musical forms including Indian raga. Founding members of the group came from Greek, Middle Eastern, Arabic, jazz, and classical musical backgrounds.

== Members ==
The Epichorus is led by Rabbi Zach Fredman (oud, composer, guitar, mbira, vocals). Other members and guest musicians have included:

- Alsarah – vocals
- Priya Darshini – vocals
- Megan Gould – violin
- Daniel Ori – upright bass, bass guitar
- Rich Stein – percussion
- Uri Sharlin – accordion
- Yosef Goldman – vocals, percussion
- Max ZT – hammered dulcimer
- Liron Peled – dumbek
- Shir Yaakov – vocals
- Tanios Androus – ney, oud
- April Centrone – percussion
- Yuval Aberman – guitar
- Joseph Brent – mandolin
- Bassam Saba – ney
- Hadar Noiberg – flute
- Basya Schechter – kanjira

== Discography ==
=== Studio albums ===
- One Bead (2012)
- L'Oud and the Abstract Truth (2016)
- Najara (2018)
- Solitudes (2021)
- Ten at Dreamland; Healing & Lineage (2021)

=== EPs ===
- Precession (2016)

=== Live albums ===
- Yamim Noraim 5781 (Live at Zoomland) (2020)

=== Singles ===
- "Modeh Ani" (2020)
- "Shachar" (2020)
- "Refuah (Healing)" (2021)
