= Pharaoh's Daughter =

American Jewish world music band

- Origin: New York City, New York, USA
- Genres: Jewish rock, psychedelic folk, world music
- Years active: 1995-present
- Labels: Orchard, Knitting Factory, Tzadik, OY
- Members: Basya Schechter; Daphna Mor; Meg Okura; Yuval Lion; Shanir Ezra Blumenkranz; Jason Lindner; Mathias Kunzli; Uri Sharlin
- Past members: Noah Hoffeld; Daniel Freedman; Alan Kashan
- Website: pharaohsdaughter.com

Pharaoh's Daughter is an American Jewish world music band from New York City. Formed in 1995 by Basya Schechter.

== History ==
Basya Schechter formed Pharaoh's Daughter in 1995 while attending Barnard College. The band's name is a reference to Schechter's given name, a Yiddish variant of the Biblical daughter of Pharaoh, Bithiah. They debuted in 1999 with the independent album Daddy's Pockets and were signed to Knitting Factory Records later that year. The label then released the band's second album, Out of the Reeds (2000). Their 2014 album Dumiyah was produced by Jamshied Sharifi and featured contributions from Steven Bernstein, Shir Yaakov Feit, Adam Levy, Mauro Refosco, and Marcus Rojas.

Group members have been involved in a variety of other notable projects. In particular, Basya Schechter has released two solo albums and has performed with the groups Darshan and The Epichorus.

== Musical style ==
Pharaoh's Daughter's sound draws from American folk, Jewish klezmer, avant-garde, new-age, Renaissance, electronic, and Middle Eastern music.

== Band members ==
=== Current ===
- Basya Schechter — lead vocals, guitar, oud, saz, percussion
- Daphna Mor — recorders, zurna, ney, melodica, vocals
- Meg Okura — violin
- Shanir Ezra Blumenkranz — bass
- Yuval Lion — drums
- Jason Lindner — rhodes piano, keys
- Mathias Kunzli — percussion
- Uri Sharlin — accordion, vocals

=== Former ===
- Benoir - guitar, vocals
- Daniel Freedman — drums
- Noah Hoffeld — cello
- Alan Kashan — santur
- Jen Gilleran: tabla, vocals
- Martha Colby: cello, vocals
- Jarrod Cagwin: percussion (frame drums, clay drums, dumbek)
- Tracey Love-Wright: flute, clarinet, crumhorn, vocals

== Discography ==
- Daddy's Pockets (Orchard, 1999)
- Out of the Reeds (Knitting Factory, 2000) - rereleased on Tzadik in 2004
- Exile (Knitting Factory, 2002)
- Great Jewish Music: Sasha Argov Tzadik, 2003 The song "Anakhnu lo rakdanim" (we're not dancers) 5:01
- Haran (OY, 2007)
- Dumiyah (Magenta, 2014)
