= Weekly Volcano =

Weekly newspaper in Tacoma, Washington

- Type: Alternative weekly
- Format: Tabloid
- Owner: Independent
- Publisher: Angela Jossy
- Founded: 2001
- Relaunched: 2023
- Language: English
- Headquarters: Tacoma, Washington, U.S.
- Website: weekly-volcano.com

Weekly Volcano is a weekly entertainment newspaper in based in Tacoma, Washington, United States. It serves the southern Puget Sound region and reports on film, theater, food, art and music. It ceased publishing after a 2013 merger but re-emerged under new ownership in 2023.

At its peak in its previous incarnation, the Weekly Volcano had 670 distribution points from Federal Way to Tumwater, reaching more than 92,000 readers every Thursday. It began publication on November 1, 2001, and was founded by publisher Ron Swarner. Swarner's brother Ken later took over as publisher. Weekly Volcano also published Northwest Military, which serves military families.

The newspaper organized the annual Tacoma Restaurant Week from 2008 onward.

The Weekly Volcano was merged into the Ranger and Northwest Airlifter as an entertainment supplement in April 2013. Its last article through the merger was published in 2021.

The Weekly Volcano was purchased and re-launched in February 2023 by a long time writer for the publication, Angela Jossy.
