= Bassam Saba =

Lebanese musician (1958–2020)

Bassam Saba (26 October 1958 – 4 December 2020) was a Lebanese musician and a promoter of Arabic music in the west.

He was a co-founder of the New York Arabic Orchestra and the director of Lebanon's national conservatory of music.

He died of complications from COVID-19 in Beirut, Lebanon, on December 4, 2020.

== Early life and education ==
Saba was born on 26 October 1958, in Tripoli, Lebanon. His father, Antoine Saba, worked for an oil company. His mother, Delena Saba, was a homemaker. His family was musical, and his older siblings taught him to play the nay. At the outset of the Lebanese Civil War in 1976 he went to Paris to study music at the Conservatoire Municipal des Gobelins in Paris, where he earned his BA in Western Classical Music and Flute Performance, and the Gnessin School in Moscow, where he received a master's degree in Western Flute Performance and Music Education. He then moved to the United States and settled in Northport, New York.

== Career ==
Saba started a band in New York, and traveled throughout the world to promote Lebanese and Arabic music. He performed as a soloist for the Hanover Philharmonic, Qatar Philharmonic, Beirut Philharmonic, Zurich Orchestra, and East Oakland Bay Symphony and others. Saba also composed for and performed with his own musical ensemble called Myriad, and directed the Middle Eastern Ensemble of Harvard University.

Saba was a former member of Yo Yo Ma's Silk Road Ensemble and Global Musician Workshop faculty.

In 2007, he co-founded the New York Arabic Orchestra.

He played music with many established western musicians throughout his career, including Sting, Alicia Keys, Herbie Hancock and Quincy Jones. He also played with some of the major cultural figures from the Arab region, including Fairouz and Marcel Khalife. Saba lived in the United States for almost 30 years. In 2018, he was offered a job as the president of the Lebanese National Higher Conservancy of Music, for which, due to bureaucratic error, he was never paid. He played many instruments, including the nay (an Arabic flute), oud, violin and flute.

== Awards ==
He was named one of the 10 Most Outstanding Artists by the Arab American National Museum in 2007.

== Personal life ==
Saba was married to Dr. Diala Jaber and had a daughter, Mariana. According to his daughter, Saba was eager to introduce Arabic music to as many people as he could, including by volunteering to teach her high school choir how to sing muwashahat, an Arabic musical genre.

== Final performance and death ==
On 17 October 2020, Saba played the flute in a chamber piece by Telemann in the town of Bsharri in a church there as part of his work to raise money for the conservancy that had been damaged in the huge port explosion on 4 August 2020, which left 200 people dead and caused considerable damage. Three days later. he was infected with COVID-19 amid the COVID-19 pandemic in Lebanon at a board meeting at the conservatory. He was hospitalized and later transferred to the non-Covid ICU at the American University of Beirut Medical Center when he was considered no longer contagious. A few days later, he developed septic shock after contracting a "superbug". He was intubated, but later died from complications of COVID-19, on 4 December 2020, at the age of 62.
