= The State of the Art Is Failure =

Studio album by Saints of Everyday Failures
- Released: March 21, 2006
- Genre: Alternative hip hop
- Length: 58:13
- Label: Old Growth
- Producer: My Left Foot; Tha Goonie; Smoke M2D6; Paul Schrag

Saints of Everyday Failures chronology
True Meaning of Survival (2005)	The State of the Art Is Failure (2006)	Waywordwonderwill (2009)

The State of the Art Is Failure is the second and final album by rapper Eprhyme with his group Saints of Everyday Failures. It was released on March 21, 2006 through Old Growth Records, with production by My Left Foot, Tha Goonie, Smoke M2D6, and Paul Schrag. Among the album's featured artists are members of Typical Cats, Oldominion, and Shape Shifters, including Awol One, 2Mex, and Sleep.

== Track listing ==
The State of the Art Is Failure track listing
No.	Title	Length
1.	"State of the Art"	4:12
2.	"Aggressive Optimism"	3:50
3.	"Play Write Work Write"	5:06
4.	"Sketch Paint Sculp"	3:23
5.	"Keep It Movin'" (featuring Compost)	3:34
6.	"Stay High"	4:04
7.	"South Sound"	3:15
8.	"Cry for Help"	5:21
9.	"Fire by Night"	3:54
10.	"Paradox City" (featuring Awol One)	4:17
11.	"Art of the Covenant"	3:35
12.	"Public Execution"	2:54
13.	"Outro"	0:59
14.	"Black Book" (featuring AKA, Brad B, Anglo, XPERIENCE, Arpeggio, Feest, Smoke M2D6, Jacob's Ladder, Denizen Kane, Mestizo, Jamie Clemens, Compost, Glimpse, Onry Ozzborn, Barly, Existereo, Akuma, Toni Hill, James Martinez, 2Mex, Biru, Matre, Sleep and Syndel)	9:49
Total length:		58:13

== Personnel ==
Saints of Everyday Failures

- Eprhyme – MC
- D-Scribe – MC
- Tha Goonie – production

Other

- My Left Foot, Smoke M2D6, Paul Schrag – production
- Compost, Awol One, Denizen Kane, Mestizo, AKA, Brad B, XPERIENCE, Arpeggio, Feest, Jacob's Ladder, Jamie Clemens, Glimpse, Onry Ozzborn, Barly, Existereo, Akuma, Toni Hill, James Martinez, 2Mex, Biru, Matre, Sleep, Syndel – guest rapping
