= Waywordwonderwill =

Studio album by Eprhyme
- Released: September 8, 2009
- Genre: Alternative hip hop
- Length: 41:36
- Label: Shemspeed, K
- Producer: Smoke M2D6, Paul Schrag, Sunday Grip

Eprhyme chronology
The State of the Art is Failure (2006)	Waywordwonderwill (2009)	Dopestylevsky (2011)

Singles from Waywordwonderwill
- 1. "Punklezmerap" Released: March 4, 2008; 2. "Shomer Salaam" Released: June 23, 2009

Waywordwonderwill is the debut solo album by Jewish rapper Eprhyme, released on September 8, 2009 through Shemspeed Records. It was produced by Smoke M2D6 of Oldominion. The album's two singles, "Punklezmerap" and "Shomer Salaam", were originally released by K Records as part of its International Pop Underground series, marking the label's first hip hop releases in more than ten years. A release party for the album was held in New York's East Village.

== Track listing ==
No.	Title	Length
1.	"Tikkun Adam" (featuring Shir Yaakov)	1:51
2.	"It's All G-d"	3:37
3.	"Punklezmerap" (featuring Nomy Lamm)	2:11
4.	"Shomer Salaam"	3:35
5.	"Tears of Stone"	2:44
6.	"My Mouth is a House of Prayer"	3:20
7.	"Where The Heart Is"	4:23
8.	"The Impossible Dream"	2:14
9.	"Pride and Prejudice"	4:54
10.	"Beggin' For Change"	2:41
11.	"Face to Face"	3:24
12.	"Heavy Shtetl"	2:21
13.	"Fixing Midnight" (featuring Shir Yaakov)	4:21
Total length:		yes

== Personnel ==
- Eprhyme – primary artist
- Nomy Lamm, Stephanie Schief, Shir Yaakov – additional vocals
- Smoke M2D6, Paul Schrag, Sunday Grip – production
- Seth Kushner – photography
