= Eden Village Camp =

Jewish organic farm camp in Putnam Valley, New York, U.S.

Coordinates: 41.412512°N 73.865343°W

Eden Village Camp is a co-ed Jewish sleep-away organic farm camp in Putnam Valley, New York. It is a non-profit sustainable-living "farm-to-table" camp founded by Yoni Stadlin and Vivian Lehrer, located on 248 acres (100 ha) touching the Appalachian Trail, 50 miles north of New York City.

== Culture of Kindness ==
Eden Village promotes a "Culture of Kindness" to the campers. Part of that culture includes a guideline on "Body Talk." Campers refrain from talking about others appearances, positive or negative. This concept gained a lot of press in the NY Times and the Today Show. Commonly misconstrued as a strict rule at camp, body talk is a guideline that serves as an image-based break for campers and allows them to attempt communicating in alternative ways. The goal is to limit bullying, social cruelty, and an inflated focus on image during the campers time at Eden Village.

== History ==
Eden Village Camp was founded in 2006 by Yoni Stadlin and Vivian Lehrer. Their aim was to create a sleep-away camp based on the Jewish tenets of social justice, spirituality, and environmental stewardship. In 2010, the Jewish Week recognized Yoni and Vivian as two of the “36 under 36” (the 36 most influential Jewish leaders under the age of 36). Yoni holds an M.A. in Informal Jewish Education from the Jewish Theological Seminary, and directed the 92nd Street Y's science and nature day camp for two years. He is a veteran educator for the Teva Learning Center, the country's leading Jewish environmental education program. The founders received a $1.16 million Incubator grant from the Foundation for Jewish Camp in September 2008, as one of five Specialty Camps supported by FJC and the Jim Joseph Foundation. The Incubator Grant provides mentorship and funding for Eden Village Camp for five years. The camp opened to campers for the first time in the summer of 2010, and now has over 400 campers per summer.

== Affiliates ==
Eden Village Camp is sited on land owned by the UJA-Federation. In addition, Eden Village Camp is supported by the Foundation for Jewish Camp and the Jim Joseph Foundation. Eden Village is an independent camp and is not affiliated with any one denomination of Judaism, instead aiming to create a diverse Jewish community. Though the camp is heavily influenced by the teaching of the Jewish Renewal movement and its founder, Rebbe Zalman Schachter-Shalomi.

== See also ==
- Jewish Farm School
