= Cafe Antarsia Ensemble =

Cafe Antarsia Ensemble (CAE) was created in New York City, United States, in 2001 when Greek/Texan Nikos Brisco and Ruth Margraff invited Egyptian-American percussionist Rami El-Aasser to join them for the live scoring of their first “world folk opera” "Judges 19: Black Lung Exhaling" created in Texas and New York and premiered at theater festivals in Moscow, Russia and Belgrade, Serbia.

Brisco and Margraff lived and studied Rromani/Gypsy music, history and language with the Gourbeti tribe in Valjevo, Serbia in the summer 2004 and have been influenced by their Serbian teacher Dragan Ristic's gypsy/jazz ensemble KAL and, lately, Chicago maestro Djula Milosavljevic's (aka Juliano Milo) of the virtuoso Balkan Romalen Ensemble "Gypsy Legend". Adding Ron Riley's rock steady rhythms and Delta slide, the Ensemble took their name from the Greek word for “rebellious,” also the title of an opera they are writing based on the 1889 failed rebellion of Crete at the end of the Ottoman Empire, inspired by Nikos Kazantzakis’ novel Freedom or Death.

CAE has toured together and performed internationally in Russia, Serbia, Croatia, Turkey, Greece, Czech Republic, Quebec, Hungary, Romania and Great Britain as well as all over New York and the USA. The Ensemble has received awards from Meet The Composer Global Connections to perform at the Karantena International Festival in Dubrovnik, a 2001 ITI-United States/TCG Travel Grant and University of Texas Research Grant (to Bosnia, Greece and Turkey), an NEA/TCG 1999-2000 playwriting residency at HERE Arts Center in New York, a 2003 Arts International Fund for U.S. Artists and a 2003 and 2004 ITI/TCG travel grant (to Moscow, Russia) and (to Belgrade, Serbia); and a 2005 Trust for Mutual Understanding award for travel to Croatia, Serbia and Hungary.

Nikos Brisco signed to INNOVA Recordings in 2007 and his first release for the label is Cafe Antarsia Ensemble "Songs of the Table" released Oct, 16 2007.

Cafe Antarsia Ensemble's Songs Of The Table is a “world folk” album inspired by Greek Rebetiko, Kritika rebel songs and Balkan Rroma/Gypsy music, rooted in the rhythms of Middle Eastern percussion and Americana folk. The CD was recorded in the summer of 2006 in the sanctuary of Pagosa Springs, Colorado, produced by Kevin Johnson after Nikos Brisco and Ruth Margraff returned from a four-month Fulbright “New Opera” fellowship in Athens, Thessaloniki, Paros and Crete (Greece).

The CD features handmade instruments such as French Gypsy Guitars, Greek Bouzouki, Tzouras and Baglama, Cretan Laouto, Accordion, Tabla, Riq and frame drum. Greek-Texan composer/songwriter Nikos Brisco's melodies are complemented by the lyrics of playwright/performer Ruth Margraff.
