= Basya Schechter =

American singer-songwriter

- Born: Brooklyn, New York
- Origin: New York City, New York
- Genres: Jewish music, folk rock, world music
- Occupation(s): Singer, songwriter, multi-instrumentalist, composer, producer, cantor, music teacher
- Instrument(s): Vocals, guitar, oud, saz, percussion
- Years active: 1995–present
- Labels: Tzadik
- Member of: Pharaoh's Daughter; Darshan
- Website: pharaohsdaughter.com

Basya Schechter is an American singer-songwriter, multi-instrumentalist, composer, producer, cantor, and music teacher. She is the lead singer and founder of the world/folk rock band Pharaoh's Daughter and has released two solo albums. She has also collaborated with the groups Darshan and The Epichorus.

Raised in the Hasidic Jewish community of Borough Park, Schechter left Orthodoxy after high school but maintained a love for the traditional Jewish music of her youth. Her own music often blends concepts from Jewish music with a variety of styles and sounds from Eastern Europe, the Arab world, and Africa, among others.

== Early life ==
Schechter was born to an Orthodox Jewish family and grew up in the Borough Park neighborhood of Brooklyn, New York. Her father was in a short-lived barbershop quartet managed by Don Kirshner during the 1950s; after the group's demise, he returned to school and became an accountant. During Basya's childhood, he often sang with her on Shabbat and exposed her to Israeli artists like Tzvika Pick, Shimi Tavori, and Kaveret. Her parents divorced when she was nine; she went to live with her father, who remarried when she was 14. She has said that due to her chaotic family life, she was less restricted than others in her community.

She attended the local Bais Yaakov for much of her schooling, where she choreographed several high school dance performances. After high school, she briefly attended an Orthodox girls' seminary in Jerusalem before being asked to leave due to her rebellious behavior; she subsequently spent time in Egypt, where she was introduced to Arabic music. Returning to New York, she attended Barnard College as an English major, during which time she began writing and performing songs. In her late twenties, she held various jobs, including a brief stint as editor of the Street News homeless poet page, and went backpacking throughout Africa, the Aegean Region, and Kurdistan, studying the music and instruments of various countries.

== Career ==
=== Pharaoh's Daughter ===
Schechter formed Pharaoh's Daughter in 1995 while in college. The band's name is a reference to Schechter's given name, a Yiddish variant of the Biblical daughter of Pharaoh, Bithiah. They debuted in 1999 with the independent album Daddy's Pockets and were signed to Knitting Factory Records later that year. The label then released the band's second album, Out of the Reeds (2000). Their most recent album, Dumiyah, was released in 2014.

=== Solo career ===
Schechter released her debut solo album, Queen's Dominion, in 2004 on Tzadik Records. The album was conceived by Schechter and percussionist Jarrod Cagwin and was produced by her and Albert Leusink (Swingadelic, System Band).

In 2011, she released Songs of Wonder, an album of musical arrangements of the Yiddish-language poetry of Rabbi Abraham Joshua Heschel. She had been introduced to Heschel's poetry in 2005 after receiving a volume of it from a congregant at B'nai Jeshurun. Prior to its release, the album was premiered at Tzadik's Radical Jewish Culture Festival.

== Other work ==
Schechter is a cantor and musical director for the Romemu congregation. She has also been the cantor at the Fire Island Synagogue since 2012. She previously played percussion during Friday night services at B'nai Jeshurun Synagogue on the Upper West Side. In 2015, she, Suzanne Vega, and Roma Baran provided vocal support at a Passover seder hosted by Laurie Anderson at Russ & Daughters. Later that year, she appeared with writer Shulem Deen at a Jewish Week-sponsored literary forum at Congregation Rodeph Sholom on the subject of leaving Orthodoxy. She is a former arts fellow at the Drisha Institute.

== Personal life ==
Schechter was romantically involved with Rabbi Shaul Magid beginning in 2013 and created an album together. As noted in a review of the album in Musica Judaica, "Cantor Basya Schechter and Rabbi Shaul Magid developed a localized musical tradition of setting Kabbalat Shabbat texts to Appalachian old-time music... over the course of a decade" together at Fire Island, resulting in "a timeless, transcendent musical experience"

== Discography ==
=== Albums ===
==== Solo ====
- Queen's Dominion (2004, Tzadik)
- Songs of Wonder (2011, Tzadik)

==== With Darshan ====
- Deeper and Higher (2015)
- Raza (2017)

==== With Pharaoh's Daughter ====
- Daddy's Pockets (1999)
- Out of the Reeds (2000)
- Exile (2002)
- Haran (2007)
- Dumiyah (2014)

==== With Mycale ====
- Mycale: Book of Angels Volume 13 (2010)

=== Other credits ===
- The Klezmatics, Rise Up! Shteyt Oyf! (2003) – chorus (on "Yo Riboyn Olam")
- Frank London, Divan (2003) – vocals
- Anthony Coleman, With Every Breath: The Music of Shabbat at BJ (1999) – percussion, background vocals
- Various, W.O.W. Women of Williamsburg Project – main artist ("In A Box")
- Sanda Weigl, Gypsy Killer (2002) – hand percussion
- B'nai Jeshurun Synagogue, Tekiyah: High Holy Days (2004) – vocals, percussion
- Dan Zanes, The Welcome Table (2008) – vocals, oud
- EarthRise Soundsystem, The Yoga Sessions (2010) – featured artist, oud
- The Epichorus, L'Oud and the Abstract Truth (2016) – kanjira

== Filmography ==
=== Documentary appearances ===
- Divan (2003)
- Leaving the Fold (2008) – Canadian documentary on young men and women who left the Hasidic Jewish community, featuring former Hasidic Jews in the United States, Israel and Canada.
- All of the Above: Single, Clergy, Mother (2014)

=== As composer ===
- Thunder in Guyana (2003)
- Beyond Eyruv (2006)
- Leaving the Fold (2008)
- Fidelity (2008)
