= Y-Love =

American rapper (born 1978)

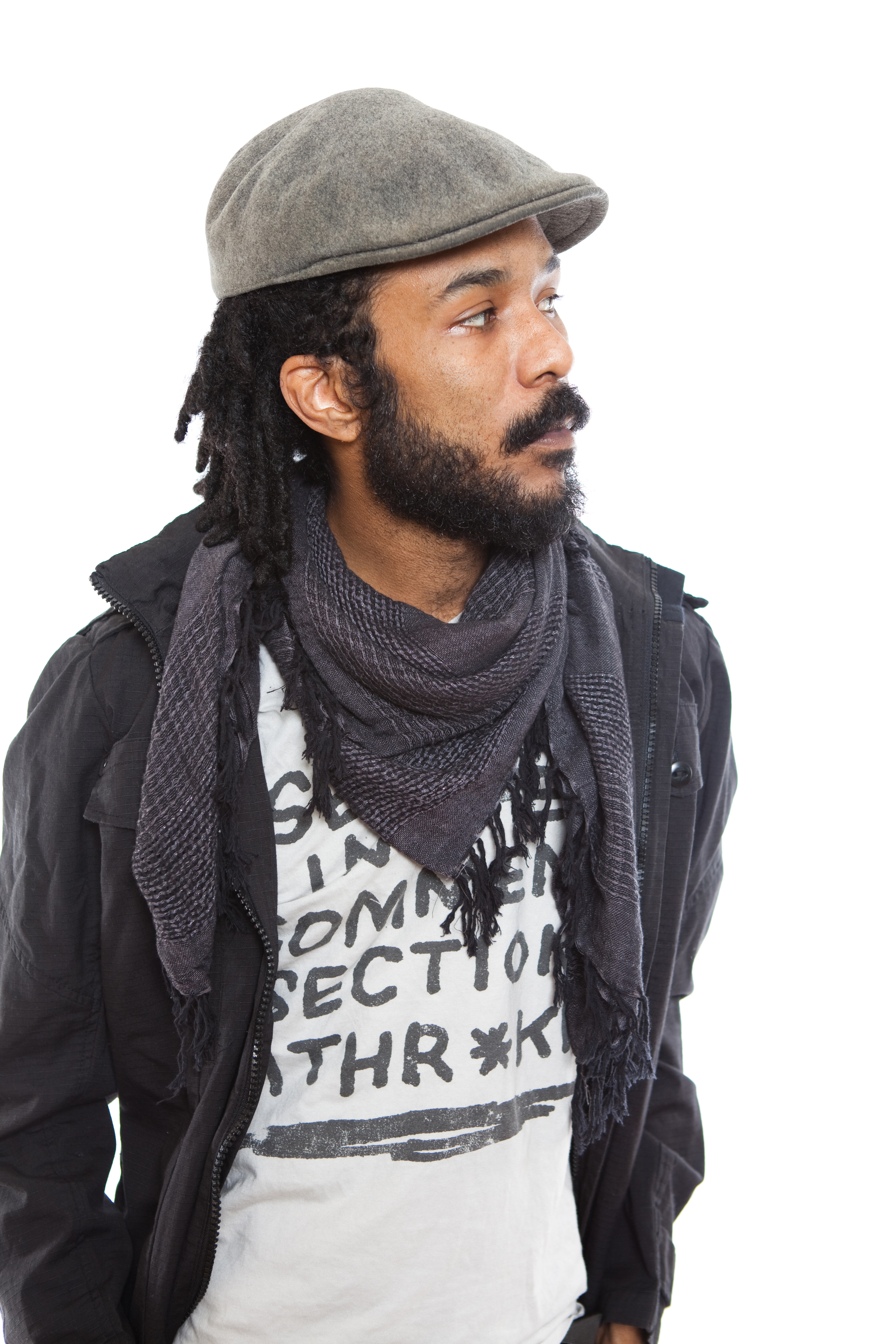
- Yitz 'Y-Love' Jordan

Background information
- Born: January 5, 1978 (age 48); Baltimore, Maryland, U.S.
- Genres: Jewish hip-hop
- Occupation: Rapper
- Years active: 2005–present
- Label: Shemspeed
- Website: thisisylove.com

Yitz Jordan (born January 5, 1978), better known by his stage name Y-Love, is an American hip hop artist. An Orthodox Jew, Jordan was formerly Hasidic. Jordan rhymes in a mixture of English, Hebrew, Yiddish, Arabic, Latin and Aramaic, often covering social, political and religious themes.

== Biography ==
=== Personal life ===
Jordan, an only child, was born and raised in Baltimore, Maryland to a Christian Ethiopian father and Puerto Rican mother, occasionally attending a Baptist church. As a youth, Jordan was a fan of the conscientious rhymes of KRS-One and Public Enemy's Chuck D.

Jordan first became interested in Judaism at the age of seven. "I saw a commercial that said, 'Happy Passover from your friends at Channel 2,'" he said, "and I went drawing six-pointed stars on everything at my mother's house." He started wearing a kippah and observing Shabbat at 14, and converted to Judaism around the turn of millennium. He later spent time studying at a yeshiva in Jerusalem. In May 2012, Jordan came out as gay. As of 2012, he still identified as an Orthodox Jew. However, by 2013 he proclaimed himself off the derech, which means, no longer observant of torah and mitzvos.

=== Career ===
After moving to Brooklyn in 2001, Jordan began performing at open mics around the city as Y-Love. He received a measure of criticism from the local Jewish population for also being a member of the hip hop community.

Y-Love released his first mixtape in 2005, DJ Handler Presents Y-Love: The Mixtape, leading to an award for Best Hip Hop Artist at Heeb's 2006 Jewish Music Awards. A few years later, he teamed up with beatboxer Yuri Lane to record the acapella album, Count It (Sefira).

In the Fall of 2008, Y-Love released his first solo full-length album, This Is Babylon. XXL said the album "balances Jewish spirituality with party rhymes and political commentary in an effort to spread [Y-Love's] message of global unity." His 2011 EP See Me (produced by Diwon) debuted as a "New and Noteworthy Release" on the front page of the iTunes Hip Hop page. The music video for the EP's single "This Is Unity" was called "awesome" by URB.

In Fall of 2014, Y-Love appeared in a documentary called Punk Jews. Y-Love took a 7-year hiatus before returning to the stage in 2019.

In June 2020 he became the chief product officer at Tribe Herald, a news site for Jews of Color.

== Musical style ==
Y-Love generally comes up with his rhymes through freestyling. "You freestyle and wait until something hot comes out," he says.

The Jerusalem Post called Y-Love a "spiritual, rapping guru" who is "front and center in a trending hip-hop revolution." He was named to The Jewish Week's 2009 36 Under 36, an annual list of 36 notable Jews under the age of 36. "I'm using hip hop to elevate," Y-Love stated. "That's what I'm about."

Y-Love uses strong Jewish themes in his lyrics, saying "We know that the Book of Psalms was written using the types of musical instruments which were contemporary to King David's day. Today we have digital equipment."

== Discography ==
=== Albums ===
| Release date | Album | Label |
|---|---|---|
| April 14, 2008 | Count It (Sefira) (Y-Love & Yuri Lane) | Modular Moods/Shemspeed |
| October 27, 2008 | This Is Babylon | Modular Moods/Shemspeed |

=== Extended plays ===
| Release date | Album | Label |
|---|---|---|
| May 14, 2010 | Change (DeScribe & Y-Love) | Modular Moods/Shemspeed |
| May 17, 2011 | See Me | Shemspeed |

=== Singles ===
- "Change" - DeScribe & Y-Love, prod. Prodezra. Released May 14, 2010.
- "Boom Selecta" - Shemspeed MCs vs. Electro Morocco (feat. Y-Love, DeScribe, Kosha Dillz & Eprhyme). Released July 12, 2010.
- "Move On" - Y-Love feat. DeScribe. Released August 10, 2010.
- "The Takeover" - Y-Love feat. TJ Di Hitmaker & Andy Milonakis. Released October 18, 2011.
- "Focus on the Flair" - Y-Love feat. Onili. Released May 15, 2012.

=== Mixtapes ===
- DJ Handler Presents Y-Love: The Mix Tape (2005)

== TV appearances ==
- London & Kirschenbaum - Israeli Channel 10 (July 2007)
- BBC World TV (September 2008)
- Late Night with Conan O'Brien - with Erran Baron Cohen (December 12, 2008)
- The Jewish Channel (multiple appearances since 2008)
- "Faith, Music and Culture" - CBS Special (June 7, 2009)
- Fox 2 Detroit (March 25, 2011)
