= Hazon =

American nonprofit organization

- חָזוֹן
- Formation: 2000; 26 years ago
- Founder: Nigel Savage
- Type: Non-profit
- Purpose: Sustainability
- Headquarters: New York City, United States
- Website: hazon.org

Hazon (Hebrew: חָזוֹן [χaˈzon]) is an American nonprofit organization based in New York City that seeks to "create new vision" in the Jewish community through outdoor and environmental education. It was founded in 2000 by its British-born CEO Nigel Savage. The organization claims to be America's "largest faith-based environmental organization". Hazon's advisory board of directors is chaired by Ruth Messinger.

In 2023, Hazon merged with the Pearlstone Retreat Center to form a new organization called Adamah.

== Name and aims ==
In Hebrew, hazon means "vision".

In March 2019, Hazon issued a cease and desist order to stop an Israeli right-wing organization that is against same-sex marriages and promotes a Jewish religious agenda from using its trademarked name. Savage has stated that the messages from the Israeli organization "radically stand against all that we have done, and all that we have tried to do, since our founding in 2000".

Hazon promotes what it calls "immersive JOFEE experiences". JOFEE stands for Jewish, Outdoor, Food, Farming & Environmental Education.

== Events ==
Hazon is best known for the Jewish environmental bike rides it organizes in the New York City region, and for its joint sponsorship of the Israel Ride, a fundraiser in Israel benefitting both Hazon and the Arava Institute for Environmental Studies. Hazon's first program was a six-week cross-USA bike ride, from Washington state to Washington, D.C. The New York ride, which takes place during Labor Day weekend each year, combines a shabbaton on the Friday and Saturday, with two days of cycling on the Sunday and Monday. The first New York ride was held in 2001. The Israel Ride has been held since 2003.

Hazon also promotes programs on issues related to food. It convenes the annual Hazon Food Conference every December. Its Tuv Ha'aretz program sponsors Jewish communities (including synagogues, Jewish Community Centers, and schools) to build community supported agriculture programs (i.e., farm shares), and to engage in study of Jewish sources and traditions as they relate to healthy eating. Tuv Ha'aretz is a Hebrew phrase that suggests both "best of the land" and "good for the land".

The organization has created an initiative called the Seal of Sustainability aimed at promoting "sustainable lifestyles and environmental consciousness".

== COVID-19 pandemic ==
During the COVID-19 pandemic, Hazon promoted the growing of produce in gardens which have been likened to the war time Victory gardens.

In July 2020, the organization announced the layoffs of 35 percent of its staff following the COVID-19 pandemic. The organization claimed a loss of $2.5 million due to canceled events.
