= Labtekwon =

American rapper

- Also known as: Labtekwon
- Born: Omar Akbar
- Origin: Baltimore, Maryland, [United States
- Genres: Hip hop Avant Garde Jazz
- Occupations: Emcee, producer
- Instruments: Microphone, Turntables
- Label: Ankh Ba Records

Labtekwon (born Omar Akbar) is an American Hip Hop artist. His name is an acronym for "Lifeform Advanced Beyond Terrestrial Esoterics King Warrior Of Nubia."

== Career ==
Labtekwon is an emcee from Baltimore, Maryland and son of soul musician Doc Soul Stirrer. and the Labtekwon became a fixture in the global underground with a long string of albums in his Labteknology series from 1994 to 2000. He was invited to Los Angeles by the Project Blowed collective to perform in 1999. In 1998, Baltimore City paper created the category “Best MC” which Labtekwon would win several years between 1998 and 2003, becoming a regular fixture in the paper's "Best of Baltimore" list. He has performed at the Lyricist Lounge in New York and was a champion of the Zulu Nation Freestyle Competition in 1995. Labtekwon has shared the stage with Afrika Bambaata, Rakim, Kool Keith, MF Doom, Psycho Les, A Tribe Called Quest, Brand Nubian, KRS-One, Black Thought, Aceyalone, Digital Underground, including his group the 410 Pharaohs on the first Baltimore Club Music/ Hip Hop hybrid album, 410 Funk.

== Discography ==
- The Brotherhood of Soul (1988)
- C Funk Laboratories (1990)
- The Ghetto Gospel EP (1993)
- Labteknology, Volume 0: Baltimoorish Science (1997)
- Labteknology, Volume 1: The Future's Now...What's Next? (1994)
- Labteknology, Volume 2: Ladies Night (Live From Hell) (1999)
- Labteknology, Volume 3: Proverbs of Passion (1995)
- "Labteknology, Volume 4: Nile Child: King of Kings (1998)
- Labteknology, Volume 5: Da Dawn (1995)
- Labteknology, Volume 7: Da Helpless Won (1996)
- Labteknology, Volume 8: Justus On Da Horizon (1998)
- Labteknology, Volume 9: The Art of Love (1999)
- "The Piankhi 7 Papyrus" (2000)
- Song of the Sovereign (2002)
- Hustlaz Guide to the Universe: Post Apocalyptic Version (2003)
- Murdaland Volume Won: Classic Jack Moves (2003)
- The Ghetto Dai Lai Llama: Hood Mystic (2005)
- Avant God (2005)
- "Ghettoclectic: King of The Slowburn" (2006)
- Population Control: Wrath of The Black Eniggma (2006)
- 93,000,000 Miles Rising (Killa Kamillionz) (2006)
- Jazzhall: The Epitome of Epiphany (The Tao of Slick) (2007)
- Emmett Till's Revenge (CSD) (2007)
- 410 Funk (410 Pharaohs) (2008)
- Di Na Ko Degg: Soul Power (2009)
- "NEXT: Baltimore Basquiat and the Future Shock" (2010)
- Hardcore: Labtekwon and the Righteous Indignation-Rootzilla vs Masta Akbar (2012)
- Evolutionary: The Omar Akbar Album/State of the Art (2013)
- B.O.P.: The Theology of Timing/Tehuti and the Het Hero Cult (2014)
- Sun of Sekhmet: The Rejected Stone-Mahdi Music (2017)
- KHUNSU (2017)
- The Black Arts Social Club presents: Baby Doc and The Fantasy of a Baltimore Paradox (2021)
- Dide Ti Sopdet (Rise of Sirius) (2021)
- Black Boogie Man: Revenge of the Last Emcee (2023)

== Personal life ==
Labtekwon is the youngest son of soul singer Harry Young, Jr., also known as "Doc Soul Stirrer". He graduated from Douglass High School, following in the footsteps of the Baltimore group Z3MC. He also holds a baccalaureate degree from the University of Maryland Baltimore County, a masters of arts degree from Morgan State University, and a doctorate degree from Howard University.
