= Isabella Freedman Jewish Retreat Center =

Coordinates: 41.9401°N 73.347°W

Isabell Freedman Jewish Retreat Center
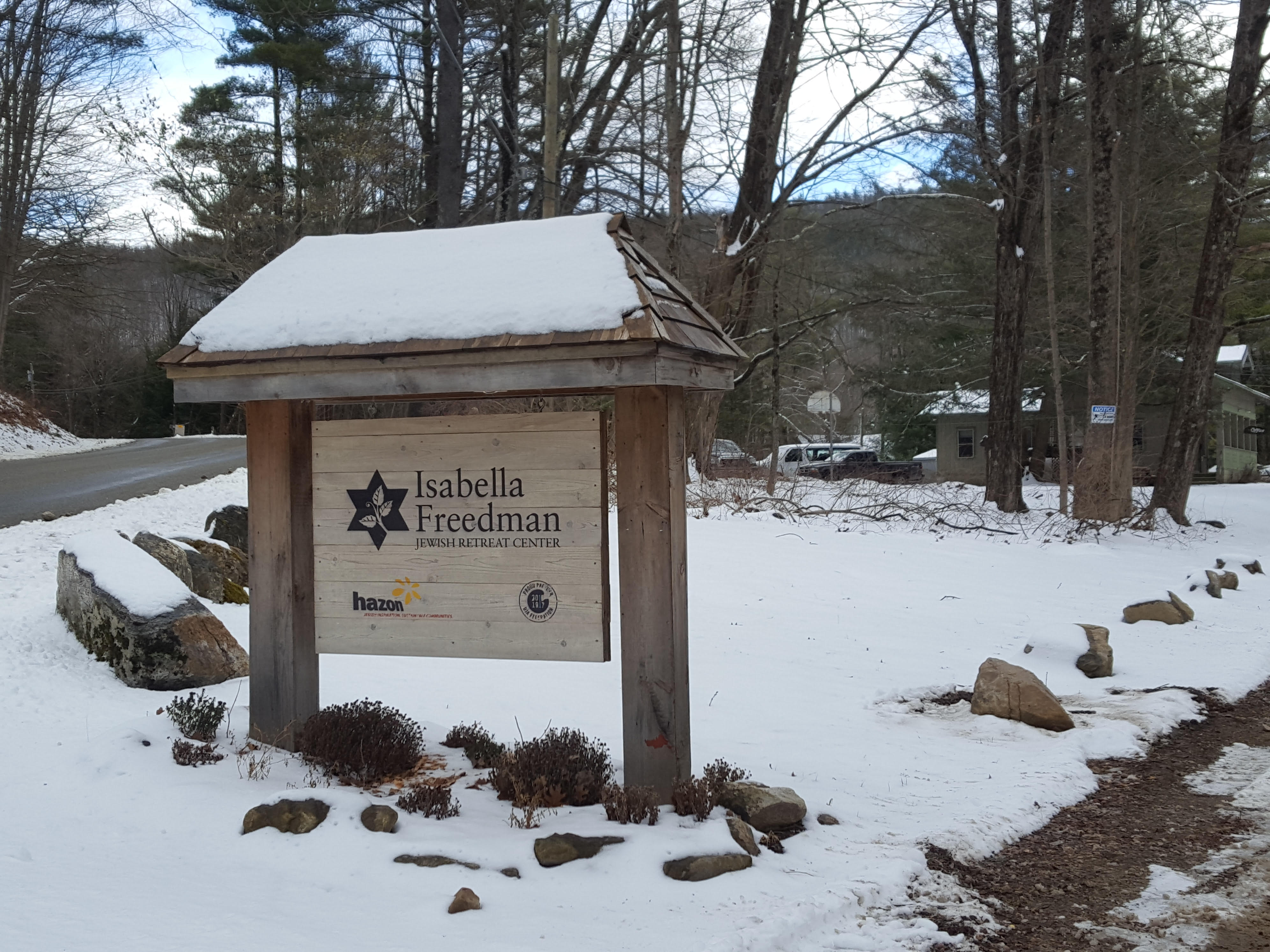
- Main entrance on January 19, 2020
- Location(s): 116 Johnson Road; Falls Village, CT 06031
- Region served: Berkshires
- Services: Retreat Center
- Parent organization: Adamah.org
- Website: adamah.org/retreat-centers/isabella-freedman/

Isabella Freedman Jewish Retreat Center sits on 400 acres of forest and meadows in the foothills of the southern Berkshires in Litchfield County, Connecticut. Isabella Freedman hosts organizational retreats, Jewish spiritual and environmental events, and private Jewish celebrations including weddings and B'nai Mitzvah. More than 30 Jewish organizations hold events at Isabella Freedman and Isabella Freedman hosts families across Jewish denominations for their popular Jewish holiday vacation programs, such as their yearly Passover, Shavuot, and "Sukkahfest" (Sukkot) retreats. The Center's kitchen is kosher under the supervision of the Hartford Kashrut Commission.

== History ==
The Jewish Working Girls Vacation Society founded the first known Jewish summer camp in 1893 called Camp Lehman on the site of what would be Isabella Freedman. Camp Lehman offered Jewish working women, primarily immigrants in the New York garment industry, an affordable vacation. The camp paid for their vacation and reimbursed campers for lost wages. In 1936, the agency’s name was changed to Camp Isabella Freedman in honor of the philanthropist and board member.

In 1956, what was then Camp Isabella Freedman moved to its current location in Falls Village, Connecticut and instituted residential programs for Jewish senior adults, which have continued every summer since. In the early 1990s, Camp Isabella Freedman opened its doors year-round.

== Teva, Adamah, and Hazon at Isabella Freedman ==
In 1994, Isabella Freedman developed the Teva Learning Center with Surprise Lake Camp, an innovative experiential learning program for Jewish elementary school students that combines ecology, Jewish spirituality, and environmental activism. In 2003, Isabella Freedman launched ADAMAH: The Jewish Environmental Fellowship, a leadership training program in which young adults live communally and engage in a hands-on curriculum that integrates organic farming and sustainable living skills with Jewish learning and living.

In 2004 the Jewish environmental organization Hazon launched its New York Jewish Environmental Bike Ride from Isabella Freedman, and the organization has since hosted most of its annual fundraising bike rides from the site. In 2006 Freedman announced the planned merger of the Isabella Freedman Jewish Retreat Center and the Elat Chayyim Jewish Retreat Center. Hazon hosted its first Jewish food conference at Isabella Freedman in 2006. Isabella Freedman announced its planned merger with Hazon in 2012, and in 2014 the merger was completed. Adamah, Elat Chayyim, and the Teva Learning Center, all based at Isabella Freedman, also merged with Hazon in 2014.

On July 19, 2009, 11 women received smicha (ordination) as kohanot from the Kohenet Hebrew Priestess Institute, based at the Isabella Freedman Jewish Retreat Center, becoming their first priestess ordainees.

== Official website ==
- Adamah.org: Isabella Freedman Jewish Retreat Center
