= Shneur Hasofer =

Shneur Hasofer (DeScribe)
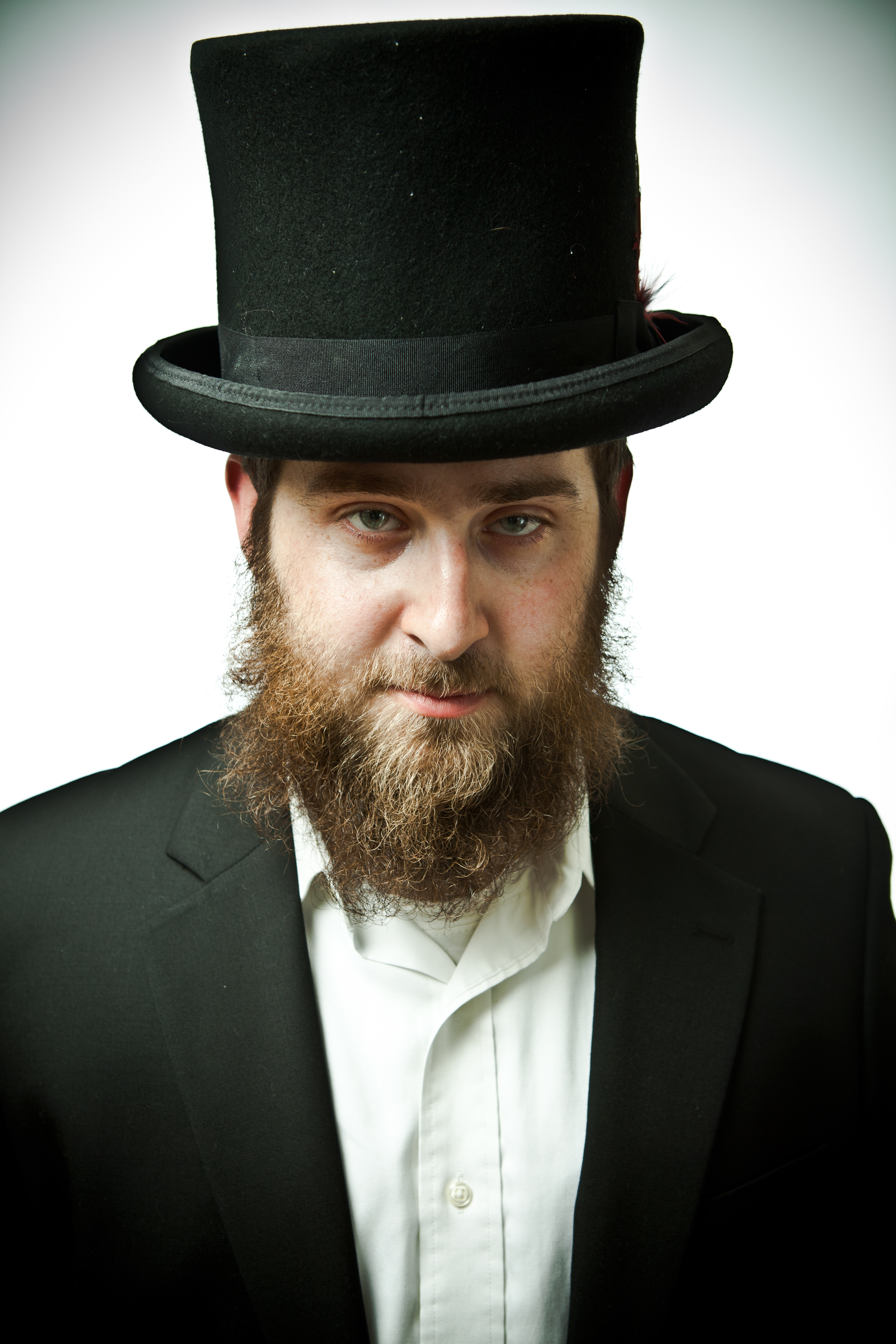

Background information
- Born: 1982 (age 43–44); Melbourne, Australia
- Years active: Late 2000s-Present
- Label: Modular Moods/Shemspeed
- Website: YouTube Channel

Shneur Hasofer is a Hasidic musician known as DeScribe. Hasofer's musical style has been characterized as "Hasidic hip-hop," "Hasidic rap" and "Hasidic R&B".

== Background ==
Hasofer was born to a Chabad Hasidic family in Melbourne, Australia. Hasofer began his music career taking the stage name "DeScribe" and has been characterized as a "Hasidic rapper."

Hasofer's music career began in New York in the late 2000s, releasing an EP called Harmony, and began collaborations with Matisyahu and Rohan Marley (son of Bob Marley). Hasofer released a duet with Matisyahu titled “Pure Soul” as part of a fundraising effort for the Friendship Circle, a non-profit Jewish organization which assists children with disabilities. Hasofer also collaborated with ex-Hasidic hip-hop artist Y-Love.

Hasofer's music also took on an activist bent in promoting racial harmony between the Chabad Hasidim and African-American and Afro-Caribbean communities in Crown Heights, Brooklyn. Hasofer released a song and music video titled “Harmony” with Rohan Marley, successfully recruiting local neighborhood leaders to participate in the video and a neighborhood campaign. The music video for Hasofer's song "Harmony" was dubbed "a groundbreaking tool for unity and racial harmony" by Brooklyn Borough President Marty Markowitz in commemorating the 20th anniversary of the Crown Heights riots.

Hasofer's other activities included teaching music recording and video editing to at-risk Hasidic teens in Crown Heights through a joint project with the ALIYAH Center in Crown Heights.

== Family ==
In 1998, Hasofer's family immigrated to the city of Rehovot in Israel while he was young. Hasofer's mother is a religious singer as well.

== See also ==
- Matisyahu
- Y-Love
- Zusha (band)
- Yitzchok Moully
- Jewish music
- Hipster Hasidim

== Notes ==
1.The name Hasofer translates to "The Scribe".
