= The Grey Area (album) =

Studio album by Onry Ozzborn
- Released: June 17, 2003
- Studios: ATB Studios; Momentum Studios; The Pharmacy
- Genres: Hip-hop, alternative hip-hop
- Length: 61:16
- Label: One Drop Records
- Producers: Mr. Hill, Onry Ozzborn, Smoke M2D6

Onry Ozzborn chronology
| Alone (2001) | The Grey Area (2003) | In Between (2005) |

Professional ratings
Review scores
| Source | Rating |
|---|---|
| AllMusic | 3/5 stars |
| The Stranger | 3/4 stars |
| XLR8R | Favorable |

The Grey Area is a studio album by American hip-hop artist Onry Ozzborn, a member of the Pacific Northwest hip-hop collective Oldominion. It was released June 17, 2003 on One Drop Records. Guest appearances include Sleep, Qwazaar and Luckyiam of Living Legends, among others.

== Music ==
The album is produced by Mr. Hill, Onry Ozzborn, Smoke M2D6, Pale Soul and Peegee 13. It also features recording artists Barfly, Bishop I, Gash, JFK Ninjaface, Karim, Luckyiam, Pale Soul, Peegee 13, Qwaazar, Qwel, Sleep and Vance Snow.

== Track listing ==
| No. | Title | Producer | Length |
|---|---|---|---|
| 1. | "The Altar" | Smoke M2D6 | 4:08 |
| 2. | "Listen & Learn" | Mr. Hill | 3:56 |
| 3. | "Dance Your Life Away" | Pale Soul, Peegee 13 | 3:44 |
| 4. | "Def Shephard" (JFK Ninjaface) | Onry Ozzborn | 3:05 |
| 5. | "The Ozz" | Mr. Hill | 3:57 |
| 6. | "Oh My" | Smoke M2D6 | 3:02 |
| 7. | "Can You Hear Me" (featuring Barfly and Bishop I) | Smoke M2D6 | 3:19 |
| 8. | "Legend Had It" | Mr. Hill | 3:56 |
| 9. | "Our Way" | Pale Soul | 4:02 |
| 10. | "A.D.F." | Onry Ozzborn | 3:07 |
| 11. | "The Breaks 03" (featuring Luckyiam) | Onry Ozzborn | 2:48 |
| 12. | "Believe 2" | Onry Ozzborn | 1:55 |
| 13. | "Poltergeist" | Mr. Hill | 4:26 |
| 14. | "717" (featuring Karim) | Mr. Hill | 4:04 |
| 15. | "Begin" | Pale Soul | 3:25 |
| 16. | "The Zone" (featuring JFK Ninjaface) | Mr. Hill | 3:49 |
| 17. | "Who's Really Listening" (featuring Qwel, Qwazaar and Sleep) | Pale Soul | 4:43 |
