= Snaps (album) =

Studio album by Mr. Hill
- Released: December 2, 2006
- Genre: Hip hop, alternative hip hop
- Length: 38:52
- Label: Hal Cush Music
- Producer: Mr. Hill

Mr. Hill chronology
Snaps (2006)	The Darkest Hour (2007)

Professional ratings
Review scores
Source	Rating
The Stranger	4/5 stars

Snaps is the debut studio album by American hip hop producer Mr. Hill, a member of the Pacific Northwest hip hop collective Oldominion. It was released December 2, 2006 on Hal Cush Music.

== Music ==
The album is fully produced by Mr. Hill, and features guest appearances from artists such as IAME, Onry Ozzborn and Boom Bap Project, among others.

== Reception ==
Snaps was given generally favorable reviews, one of which being from The Stranger, who said about the album: "Strings are his specialty, which he employs for cinematic effects and moods that correspond with Gothic architecture and the dark factories of the industrial revolution. But as Snaps makes clear, Mr. Hill is not confined to the cathedral aesthetic that he regularly programs for associates of Oldominion."

== Track listing ==
No.	Title	Length
1.	"Intro"	1:11
2.	"You Can't Fuck With Us" (featuring Anaxagorus and JFK Ninjaface)	3:29
3.	"Unorthodox Still" (featuring Silas Blak)	4:39
4.	"Workshop" (featuring Jace)	3:44
5.	"Traumathon" (featuring Nyqwil)	4:45
6.	"Saloony" (featuring IAME and Smoke)	3:55
7.	"English" (featuring Candidt)	3:30
8.	"Sounds of the Street (Remix)" (featuring Jace)	3:20
9.	"As I Talk" (featuring Boom Bap Project)	3:26
10.	"Runnin' Traffik" (featuring Silent Lambs Project)	3:22
11.	"Tequila on Sunday" (featuring Tilson)	3:08
12.	"Castro Outro" (featuring Onry Ozzborn)	0:23
