= In Between (Onry Ozzborn album) =

Studio album by Onry Ozzborn
- Released: November 8, 2005
- Genres: Hip-hop, alternative hip-hop
- Length: 39:01
- Label: Camobear Records
- Producers: Mr. Hill, Smoke M2D6, Pale Soul, Wisper

Onry Ozzborn chronology
The Grey Area (2003)	In Between (2005)	Hold On for Dear Life (2011)

Professional ratings
Review scores
Source	Rating
The Stranger	4/4

In Between is the third solo studio album by American hip-hop artist Onry Ozzborn, a member of the Pacific Northwest hip-hop collective Oldominion. It was released November 8, 2005 on Camobear Records, an independent Canadian hip-hop record label run by Josh Martinez. Guest appearances include the likes of Aceyalone, Busdriver and Ill Bill.

== Music ==
The album is produced by Mr. Hill, Smoke M2D6, Pale Soul and Wisper. It also features Aceyalone, Blac, Busdriver, Ill Bill, and Oldominion members Anaxagorus, Mako, Pale Soul, Sirens Echo, Sleep, Smoke M2D6, Snafu, Toni Hill, and Yadira Brown. Scratches are by DJ Wicked and DJ Scene.

== Track listing ==
No.	Title	Producer	Length
1.	"In Between"	Smoke M2D6	1:42
2.	"Digest The Hardcore"	Smoke M2D6	3:04
3.	"Soul Clapped"	Smoke M2D6	2:02
4.	"Goons & Assassins" (featuring Ill Bill)	Smoke M2D6	3:11
5.	"Part 3 (To Drown, World, Wisper)" (featuring Toni Hill)	Wisper	5:53
6.	"Part 4" (featuring Blac)	Mr. Hill, Wisper	2:40
7.	"Perfect People"	Smoke M2D6	3:35
8.	"Educated Guest" (featuring Busdriver)	Mr. Hill	3:16
9.	"Indy 1700" (featuring Anaxagorus, Mako, Pale Soul, Sirens Echo, Sleep, Smoke M2D6, Snafu and Yadira Brown)	Wisper	3:55
10.	"Be Quiet"	Smoke M2D6	3:36
11.	"What To Do" (featuring Aceyalone)	Pale Soul	3:15
12.	"Dance"	Smoke M2D6	2:52
