= Bat Meets Blaine =

Studio album by Qwazaar & Batsauce
- Released: September 13, 2011
- Recorded: 2010–2011
- Genres: Alternative hip hop Underground hip-hop
- Length: 41:42
- Label: Galapagos4
- Producer: Batsauce

Qwazaar & Batsauce chronology
Style Be the King (2011)	Bat Meets Blaine (2011)	Bat Meets Blaine Instrumentals (2012)

Qwazaar chronology
Style Be the King (2011)	Bat Meets Blaine (2011)	3 (2012)

Professional ratings
Review scores
Source	Rating
SYFFAL	link
The Agit Reader	(Very positive) link
Rap Reviews	link
Platform8470	(80%) link
Impose Magazine	(Positive) link
Bloggerhouse	(Very positive) link

Bat Meets Blaine is the debut full-length collaboration between Chicago-based rapper Qwazaar, of the group Typical Cats, and Berlin-based producer Batsauce. The album was released on September 13, 2011, on Galapagos4. It is the follow-up to their debut EP Style Be the King, released the previous July.

== Track listing ==
1. "A Choice" - 1:37
2. "I Know" - 2:37
3. "What Love" - 2:54
4. "Chop 'Em Down" - 2:28
5. "Eye to the Sky" - 3:04
6. "Never Weaker" - 4:20 (featuring Onry Ozzborn & Offwhyte)
7. "Surrealism" - 2:52 (featuring Lady Daisey)
8. "Power" - 2:36
9. "If It Seems Wrong" - 2:51
10. "I'm Gone" - 2:47
11. "A Feeling" - 4:11 (featuring Denizen Kane & KP the Illustrado)
12. "The Dream" - 2:39
13. "'Til It's Done" - 2:45
14. "Thank You" - 3:53
