= One (Oldominion album) =

Studio album by Oldominion
- Released: 2001
- Genre: Hip hop, alternative hip hop
- Length: 61:32
- Label: Under The Needle Recordings
- Producer: Onry Ozzborn, Andy B, Mako, Pale Soul, Snafu

Oldominion chronology
One (2001)	Make Happy (2008)

Singles from One
- 1. "Parallel To Hell / Serenade To Silence" Released: August 28, 2000

Professional ratings
Review scores
Source	Rating
AllMusic	4/5 stars
The Stranger	Favorable
SputnikMusic	4/5 stars

One is the debut studio album by Seattle hip hop collective Oldominion. It was released in 2001 on Under The Needle Recordings.

== Reception ==
The album received generally favorable reviews, with Rick Anderson of AllMusic saying "Highly recommended to all fans of progressive hip-hop." The Stranger also said "One is a masterpiece of local hip hop", and "a masterpiece of underground hip hop."

== Music ==
Oldominion, being a large collective with over twenty members, tends to have projects with not all members on it, such as One. The group's emcees included on One include Anaxagorus, Bishop I, Destro, JFK a.k.a. Ninjaface, L'Swhere, Mako, Nyqwil, Onry Ozzborn, Pale Soul, Rochester A.P., Sleep, Smoke M2D6, Snafu and Syndel. The production is handled by Andy B, Mako, Onry Ozzborn, Pale Soul and Snafu.

== Track listing ==
No.	Title	Lyrics	Music	Length
1.	"Ezmerelda"	Bishop I, Syndel	Snafu	3:57
2.	"Better"	Onry Ozzborn, Sleep	Pale Soul	5:22
3.	"Don't Kill Your Radio"	Destro, Nyqwil, Onry Ozzborn, Pale Soul, Sleep, Snafu	Snafu	3:02
4.	"Screaming In The Wind"	JFK a.k.a. Ninjaface, Snafu	Snafu	5:09
5.	"Toy Story"	Anaxagorus	Andy B.	5:02
6.	"Dawgs Of War"	Destro, Nyqwil, Onry Ozzborn, Sleep, Snafu	Pale Soul	3:15
7.	"Look In Your Eyes"	Snafu	Snafu	4:20
8.	"Harshest Darkness"		Mako	4:48
9.	"View Items"	Nyqwil, Onry Ozzborn	Onry Ozzborn	3:16
10.	"Amen"	Destro, Nyqwil, Onry Ozzborn, Pale Soul, Sleep, Snafu	Snafu	4:21
11.	"Serenade To Silence"	Destro, JFK a.k.a. Ninjaface, L'Swhere, Mako, Onry Ozzborn, Pale Soul, Sleep, Smoke M2D6	Pale Soul	4:08
12.	"Imagine"	Nyqwil, Onry Ozzborn, Pale Soul, Sleep, Syndel	Onry Ozzborn	4:49
13.	"Parallel To Hell"	JFK a.k.a. Ninjaface, Pale Soul, Sleep, Smoke M2D6, Syndel	Pale Soul	5:03
14.	"We Can Drink Fire Baby, We Can Drink Fire"	Rochester A.P.	Snafu	5:00
