= Xperience =

American rapper

- Also known as: XP
- Born: Tyler W. Andrews; February 21, 1984 (age 42)
- Origin: Seattle, Washington
- Genres: Hip hop, alternative hip hop
- Occupation: Rapper
- Years active: 2004–present
- Label: Universatile Music
- Member of: Oldominion
- Website: xpmusic.rocks

Tyler W. Andrews (born February 21, 1984), better known by his stage name Xperience, is an American hip hop recording artist from Detroit, Michigan, who is currently based in Seattle, Washington. He is a member of the hip hop group Oldominion and is a frequent collaborator with fellow Pacific Northwest hip hop artist Macklemore.

== Early life ==
Xperience spent his formative years moving back and forth between Hammond, Indiana, East Chicago, Indiana, and Olympia, Washington.

== Musical career ==
Xperience first came to the attention of the Pacific Northwest hip hop scene when he independently released the album Soul Tree in 2004. Around this time he also made a name for himself in the Northwest battle rap scene, where his talents were on display in several competitions. The next year, he made his first national debut on Macklemore's debut album The Language Of My World, on the song "Hold Your Head Up". During his early years becoming a prominent member of the local scene, he made connections with Oldominion, becoming the last member to join the collective.

In 2007, he released the collaborative album with Grayskul named Facefeeder.

In 2010, he released the follow-up album to his debut named William The VIII. The album features guest appearances from Onry Ozzborn, A-Plus of Hieroglyphics and IAME, among others.

The next year, he released The Durden Papers Vol. 1.

In 2016, he released the album Chasing Grace.

== Discography ==
Studio albums

- Soultree (2004)
- William The VIII (2010)
- The Durden Papers Vol. 1 (2011)
- Chasing Grace (2016)
- Piscean (2018)
- Regal Blue '84 (2020)

Collaborative albums

- Facefeeder (2007) (with Grayskul)

EPs

- Danger On The Road (2012)

Guest appearances

- Macklemore - "Hold Your Head Up" from The Language of My World (2005)
- The Gigantics - "Keep Walking" from Die Already (2008)
- Macklemore - "Keep Marchin" from The Unplanned Mixtape (2009)
- IAME - "Maybe I'm High" from I Am My Enemy (2009)
- JFK Ninjaface - "Still Running" from Building Wings On The Way Down (2010)
- Macklemore & Ryan Lewis - "Crew Cuts" from Vs. Redux (2010)
- IAME - "What Kind Are You?" from Lame (2011)
- Grayskul - "Bad Business" from Zenith (2013)
- Sleep - "Tumbleweed" from Oregon Failure (2014)
- Macklemore & Ryan Lewis - "Brad Pitt's Cousin" and "Let's Eat" from This Unruly Mess I've Made (2016)
- Macklemore - "Church" from Gemini (2017)
