= Lame (album) =

Studio album by IAME
- Released: May 31, 2011
- Genre: Hip hop, alternative hip hop
- Length: 67:05
- Label: Taxidermy Records, Heaven Noise
- Producer: Smoke M2D6

IAME chronology
Lightfighter (2010)	Lame (2011)	Lame$tream (2012)

Professional ratings
Review scores
Source	Rating
Willamette Week	Favorable
RapReviews	8/10

Lame is a studio album by American hip hop artist IAME, a member of the Pacific Northwest hip hop collective Oldominion. It was released May 31, 2011 on both Taxidermy Records and Heaven Noise.

== Music ==
The album is entirely produced by Smoke M2D6. Guest appearances include Sapient, Toni Hill, Smoke M2D6, SolIllaquists Of Sound, Gold, Poeina Suddarth and Xperience.

== Track listing ==
All tracks produced by Smoke M2D6.

No.	Title	Length
1.	"The Proposal (Intro)"	2:12
2.	"Today"	4:22
3.	"Leverage" (featuring Sapient)	4:19
4.	"Felt So Real"	4:00
5.	"Lame"	4:01
6.	"Deaf Kid"	3:08
7.	"Thy Will" (featuring Toni Hill)	7:38
8.	"It's Not Always Pretty"	4:13
9.	"Ninja Defense"	4:02
10.	"Bright Side" (featuring Smoke M2D6)	4:27
11.	"Carlin List" (featuring Solillaquists of Sound)	3:36
12.	"Keep the Change"	3:38
13.	"Introducing McJameson"	3:48
14.	"Raw Data"	4:04
15.	"Domestikated" (featuring Poeina Suddarth)	3:54
16.	"What Kind Are You?" (featuring Smoke M2D6, Xperience and Maya Terry)	5:43
