= Hesitation Wounds (album) =

Studio album by Sleep
- Released: June 29, 2009
- Genre: Hip-hop
- Length: 43:31
- Label: Strange Famous Records
- Producers: Zavala, Pale Soul, Reanimator, Samix, Secondson, Smoke M2D6

Sleep chronology
Christopher (2005)	Hesitation Wounds (2009)	Oregon Failure (2014)

Professional ratings
Review scores
Source	Rating
The Phoenix	3/4 stars
URB	4/5 stars

Hesitation Wounds is the third studio album by American hip-hop artist Sleep, a member of the Pacific Northwest hip-hop collective Oldominion. It was released on Strange Famous Records on June 29, 2009.

== Music ==
The album features production by Zavala, Reanimator, Samix, Secondson, Pale Soul of Oldominion and Smoke M2D6 of Oldominion. Guest appearances include Del the Funky Homosapien, DJ Zone, Grayskul, and Toni Hill of Oldominion.

== Track listing ==
No.	Title	Producer	Length
1.	"Intro"	Pale Soul	3:45
2.	"Day Dreamer"	Zavala	4:03
3.	"Talk About It"	Reanimator	4:07
4.	"Who To Point The Finger At"	Reanimator	4:29
5.	"Ginelli"	Samix	5:00
6.	"Spent"	Zavala	3:15
7.	"Orchestra Of Strangers" (featuring Toni Hill)	Secondson	4:15
8.	"Hesitation Wounds" (featuring Grayskul)	Zavala	3:58
9.	"Commercial"	Pale Soul	4:53
10.	"Lothar" (featuring Del the Funky Homosapien)	Zavala	3:53
11.	"Get It"	Smoke M2D6	4:06
12.	"So Far Away"	Samix	4:28
13.	"Roll Call"	Zavala	3:59

== Personnel ==
Contributing artists

- Horns – Ross Liquid (tracks 2 and 5)
- Horns – Jamzels and Lambs Bread (track 5)
- Scratches – DJ Zone (tracks 2, 5, 6, 10, 11 and 12)
- Vocals – Toni Hill (tracks 2, 5, 7 and 12)
- Scott Preston (track 5)

Production

- Mastering, recording – Zebulon Dak
- Artwork – Coro 36
