= Deadlivers =

Studio album by Grayskul
- Released: February 15, 2005
- Genre: Hip-hop
- Length: 57:47
- Label: Rhymesayers Entertainment
- Producers: Mr. Hill; Fakts One; Bean One; Onry Ozzborn; Rob Castro

Grayskul chronology
Creature (2004)	Deadlivers (2005)	Bloody Radio (2007)

Singles from Deadlivers
- 1. "Prom Quiz" Released: 2005

Deadlivers is a studio album by American hip-hop group Grayskul. It was released on Rhymesayers Entertainment in 2005. The album is produced by Mr. Hill, Fakts One, Bean One, Rob Castro, and Onry Ozzborn and features guest appearances from Canibus, Aesop Rock, Sleep, and Mr. Lif, among others. "Prom Quiz" was released as a single from the album.

== Background ==
Over half of the album is produced by Mr. Hill, along with contributions from Fakts One, Bean One, Rob Castro, and Onry Ozzborn. It features guest appearances from Canibus, Aesop Rock, Mr. Lif, Abstract Rude, Rob Hampton, and Oldominion members Anaxagorus, Barfly, Bishop I, Destro, Hyena, Mako, Nyqwil, Pale Soul, Sleep, Smoke, Snafu, Syndel, and Tremor.

== Critical reception ==
Professional ratings
Review scores
Source	Rating
Exclaim!	favorable
RapReviews.com	7/10
The Stranger	favorable

Daryl Stoneage of Exclaim! commented that the surprise on the album is "that not all of their production fits their macabre theme and most of the memorable songs have production that's more similar to the Beatnuts than anything else." He added that "the production seems to be working a lot more than the lyrics or flows which are fairly mediocre." Charles Mudede of The Stranger called that the beats "heavy, operatic, with background string and horn loops that would be gray and black if translated into the visual terms of cinema." He described the album as "a heady concentration of Marvel comic books, gothic literature, B-rate horror movies, and post-Blade Runner science fiction."

== Track listing ==
No.	Title	Producer(s)	Length
1.	"You People"	Mr. Hill	0:16
2.	"Behold"	Fakts One	2:37
3.	"Bombs and Chemicals"	Bean One	3:33
4.	"Adversarial Theatre of Justice" (featuring Canibus and Barfly)	Mr. Hill	3:16
5.	"Action Figure of Speech"	Mr. Hill	3:10
6.	"The Spectacular Rescue"	Onry Ozzborn	3:31
7.	"Voltronic Instructional Espionage" (featuring Aesop Rock and Cip One)	Onry Ozzborn	3:13
8.	"Once Upon a Time"	Mr. Hill	3:12
9.	"Do They Exist"	Mr. Hill	3:13
10.	"Cursive" (featuring Mr. Lif)	Fakts One	4:09
11.	"Hatred Displayed"	Rob Castro	2:44
12.	"Vixen"	Mr. Hill	3:50
13.	"After Hours" (featuring Abstract Rude)	Mr. Hill	3:10
14.	"The Skul" (featuring Rob Hampton)	Mr. Hill	3:36
15.	"Prom Quiz"	Mr. Hill	3:09
16.	"Deadlivers"	Mr. Hill	3:39
17.	"Secret Wars" (featuring Anaxagorus, Barfly, Bishop I, Destro, Hyena, Mako, Nyqwil, Pale Soul, Sleep, Smoke, Snafu, Syndel, and Tremor)	Mr. Hill	7:39
Total length:			57:47

== Personnel ==
Credits adapted from liner notes.

- Onry Ozzborn – vocals, production (6, 7), art direction
- JFK – vocals, art direction
- Rob Castro – bass guitar, production (11), recording
- Mr. Hill – production (1, 4, 5, 8, 9, 12–17)
- Fakts One – production (2, 10)
- Bean One – production (3)
- Canibus – vocals (4)
- Barfly – vocals (4, 17), illustration, layout
- Aesop Rock – vocals (7)
- Cip One – vocals (7)
- Miranda – chorus vocals (8)
- DJ Wicked – turntables (9, 16)
- Mr. Lif – vocals (10)
- Abstract Rude – vocals (13)
- Rob Hampton – vocals (14)
- Anaxagorus – vocals (17)
- Bishop I – vocals (17)
- Destro – vocals (17)
- Hyena – vocals (17), illustration
- Mako – vocals (17)
- Nyqwil – vocals (17)
- Pale Soul – vocals (17)
- Sleep – vocals (17)
- Smoke – vocals (17)
- Snafu – vocals (17), mixing
- Syndel – vocals (17)
- Tremor – vocals (17)
- Barry Corliss – mastering
- Justin "Coro" Kaufman – front cover portrait
- Marissa Kaiser – photography
