= Hold On for Dear Life =

Studio album by Onry Ozzborn
- Released: January 25, 2011
- Genre: Alternative hip-hop
- Length: 57:47
- Label: Fake Four Inc.
- Producers: Sapient, Bean One, Smoke M2D6, Budo, Nickels, Mr. Hill, P Smoov, Peegee 13, Zavala

Onry Ozzborn chronology
In Between (2004)	Hold On for Dear Life (2011)	Duo (2016)

Professional ratings
Review scores
Source	Rating
Syffal	Favorable

Hold On for Dear Life is a studio album by American hip-hop artist Onry Ozzborn. It was released on Fake Four Inc. on January 25, 2011.

== Music ==
The album is produced by Sapient, Bean One, Smoke M2D6, Budo, Nickels, Mr. Hill, P Smoov, Peegee 13, and Zavala. Guest appearances include Sapient, Maggie Morrison of Gayngs, Thaddeus, Tilson and fellow Oldominion members Peegee 13, Candidt, Xperience and IAME.

== Track listing ==
No.	Title	Producer	Length
1.	"Michael Admires You" (featuring Sapient)	Sapient	2:09
2.	"The O.O."	Bean One	2:23
3.	"All To Herself"	Smoke M2D6	3:16
4.	"The Getaway Car"	Budo	3:31
5.	"That Good" (featuring Sapient)	Nickels	3:31
6.	"Way Out"	Smoke M2D6	4:11
7.	"Best Of All Time"	Bean One	3:52
8.	"Electric Dreams" (featuring Thaddeus and Tilson)	Mr. Hill	3:21
9.	"Limbo Thus Purgatory" (featuring Xperience)	Budo	3:23
10.	"Daughters"	Smoke M2D6	3:38
11.	"Hold Up"	P Smoov	3:56
12.	"Nightlife" (featuring Candidt)	Smoke M2D6	3:36
13.	"N.W.A List" (featuring Candidt, IAME and Peegee 13)	Smoke M2D6	4:10
14.	"Hold On For Dear Life"	Peegee 13	3:55
15.	"Blend In"	Zavala	2:32
16.	"I Give Up"	Smoke M2D6	4:22
17.	"Fake Four"		0:06
