= Qwel =

American rapper

- Born: Adam Vincent Schreiber; June 6, 1980 (age 46); Chicago, Illinois, United States
- Origin: Chicago, Illinois, United States
- Genre: Alternative hip-hop
- Occupations: Rapper; singer; author
- Years active: 1999–present
- Label: Galapagos4
- Member of: Typical Cats
- Website: Galapagos4

Adam Vincent Schreiber (born June 6, 1980), better known by his stage name Qwel, is an underground rapper and author, originally from Chicago, Illinois. Qwel is co-founder of the underground rap crew Typical Cats, with fellow MCs Denizen Kane and Qwazaar, and producers / DJs Kid Knish and DJ Natural. Qwel has also released full-length collaboration projects with producers Maker, Jackson Jones, Meaty Ogre, Mike Gao, Silence and Kip Killagain. Qwel's label is Galapagos4, which he is an integral part of, along with co-founders Jeff Kuglich and fellow rapper Offwhyte.

== Discography ==
=== Albums ===
Qwel
- If It Ain't Been in a Pawn Shop, Then It Can't Play the Blues (2001)
- The Rubber Duckie Experiment (2002)
- Caffeine Dream (2006) (with Mike Gao)
- Freezerburner (2006) (with Meaty Ogre)
- Nerdy (2007) (with Silence)
- The New Wine (2008) (with Kip Killagain)
- Visible Light (2011)

Qwel & Jackson Jones
- Rapid Eye Movements (2004)
- Dark Day (2005)
- 20th Street Rich (2007)
- Sideweighs (2007)
- Jump the Gun (2009)

Qwel & Maker
- The Harvest (2004)
- So Be It (2009)
- Owl (2010)
- Rarities and Remixes (2010)
- Beautiful Raw (2013)

Typical Cats (Qwel with Denizen Kane, Qwazaar, DJ Natural & Kid Knish)
- Typical Cats (2001)
- Civil Service (2004)
- Typical Bootlegs Vol. 1 (2004)
- 3 (2012)

=== EPs ===
- Peep My EP (2006)
- Saved (2007) (with Meaty Ogre)
- Occam's Razor (2013) (with Grey Sky Appeal)
- Beautiful EP (2013) (with Maker)
- Black Rain EP (2018) (with Jackson Jones)

=== Live albums ===
- Stone Soup (2005)

=== Singles ===
- "Face Value" (2001)
- "Easy Cause It Is" (2004) (with Typical Cats)
- "Blood From The Stone" (2005) (with Jackson Jones)
- "Saved" (2006) (with Meaty Ogre)
- "Owl: The Singles" (2010) (with Maker)
- "Lunch Money" (2011) (with Maker)
- "Long Walkers" (with Maker)

=== Guest appearances ===
- Molemen - "Death Wish Banger" from Chicago City Limits, Vol. 1 (2001)
- Molemen - "Not Impressed" from Ritual of the Molemen (2001)
- DJ White Lightning - "Glass and Plastic" & "Red Meat" from White on White Crime (2001)
- Denizen Kane - "Calling Card" from Tree City Legends (2002)
- Offwhyte - "Masonry" from The Fifth Sun (2002)
- Maker - "Honestly" from Honestly (2003)
- Onry Ozzborn - "Who's Really Listening" from The Grey Area (2003)
- Meaty Ogre - "Orion's Right Shoulder" from Leo vs. Pisces (2003)
- 2Mex - "Airwolf" from Knowhawk (2004)
- Mestizo - "Circle Mountain" from Life Like Movie (2004)
- Grayskul - "Anti-Glitter" from Name in Vain (2006)
- Hellsent - "Bless U" from Rainwater (2006)
- Royce - "City Heat" from Tuff Love (2006)
- El Cerebro - "Sin amor" from Simbiosis (2007)
- Mestizo - "Tolerance" from Dream State (2007)
- Nature of the Beast - "All Time Greats" from Homeland Security (2008)
- The Gigantics - "Las Vegas Swimming Pool" from Die Already (2008)
- Deeskee - "Motel Six" from Audiobiograffiti (2009)
- Qwazaar - "The Queue Who's" from Riverstyx Radio Vol. 1 (2009)
- Dark Time Sunshine - "Instructions to Numb" from Vessel (2010)
- Flight Distance - "Full Circle" from Bad Information (2011)
- Grey Sky Appeal - "Coffee and Smoke" from Hunt and Gather (2011)
- ADVENT - "Face Value Remix" from A Modern Bible (2012)
- Doze - "Early One Day" from Hell Is Hot as Hell, Boss (2014)
- Generik - "Science of Saying Something" from Raven (2014)
- Asphate - "Muad Dib" & "A Shadow's True Colors" from Closed Doors to an Open Mind (2015)
- Doze - "Wake Up" from Pay Dues Forever (2015)
- Jewels Hunter - "Annotations" & "Driftin'" from Footnotes of a Jewels Hunter (2016)
- Cas Metah - "Redemption" from Guest Room 2 (2019)
