= Christopher (Sleep album) =

Studio album by Sleep
- Released: May 31, 2005; Re-released November 24, 2009
- Genres: Hip-hop, alternative hip-hop
- Length: 72:00
- Labels: Up Above Records, Strange Famous Records
- Producers: Maker, Pale Soul, Smoke M2D6, Vitamin D, Zavala, Zebulon Dak

Sleep chronology
Riot By Candlelight (2002)	Christopher (2005)	Hesitation Wounds (2007)

Professional ratings
Review scores
Source	Rating
Exclaim!	Favorable

Christopher is the second studio album by American hip-hop artist Sleep, a member of the Pacific Northwest hip-hop collective Oldominion. It was initially released on Up Above Records on May 31, 2005 and re-released with bonus tracks on Strange Famous Records on November 24, 2009. Guest appearances include Masta Ace and Abstract Rude, among others.

== Music ==
Christopher features guest performances from Abstract Rude, Zelly Rock, Pale Soul, Masta Ace, Josh Martinez, Toni Hill, Yadira Brown, and Skratch Bastid. The album is produced by Smoke M2D6 and Zebulon Dak of Oldominion, Maker, Vitamin D, Zavala and Pale Soul.

== Track listing ==
No.	Title	Producer	Length
1.	"Intro"	Pale Soul	2:46
2.	"Say Goodbye" (featuring Zelly Rock)	Smoke M2D6	3:55
3.	"Fall Guy"	Pale Soul	4:18
4.	"I'm So Techno (Skit)" (featuring Pale Soul)	Pale Soul	1:53
5.	"Make Yourself Get Up"	Smoke M2D6	4:15
6.	"Testimony"	Pale Soul	4:27
7.	"So Tired"	Smoke M2D6	4:23
8.	"Bucket"	Smoke M2D6	4:26
9.	"Can't Be Touched" (featuring Abstract Rude)	Pale Soul	4:02
10.	"Live"	Vitamin D	4:05
11.	"Guys Like Me" (featuring Josh Martinez)	Smoke M2D6	4:52
12.	"Never" (featuring Toni Hill)	Maker	5:41
13.	"The Heat" (featuring Masta Ace)	Pale Soul	3:01
14.	"Dirt"	Pale Soul	3:30
15.	"Dirt (Interlude)"	Pale Soul	2:43
16.	"Love It to Death" (featuring Yadira Brown)	Smoke M2D6	4:22

2009 Re-release
No.	Title	Producer(s)	Length
17.	"Bring It to Life"	Zavala	4:38
18.	"Sticks and Stones"	Zavala	4:43
