= Mr. Hill =

American hip hop record producer and DJ (born 1973)

- Also known as: Phantom
- Born: Todd Joseph Gumke; January 8, 1973 (age 53)
- Origin: Seattle, Washington
- Genres: Hip hop, alternative hip hop, Pacific Northwest hip hop
- Occupations: Producer, DJ
- Years active: 1999-present
- Label: Hal Cush Music
- Website: mrhillmusic.bandcamp.com

Todd Joseph Gumke (born January 8, 1973), better known by his stage name Mr. Hill, is an American hip hop record producer and DJ from Seattle, Washington. Mr. Hill has produced for the likes of Kool Keith, Mr. Lif, Boom Bap Project and Grayskul, among others.

== Musical career ==
Mr. Hill's first production credit was in 1999, for the song "Investigation Zero" for another Pacific Northwest hip hop artist named Footprints. The song appeared on the 1999 cassette tape Operation Raw. While he was mainly DJing at the time, he eventually focused more on producing. Through making connections in the local circuit, he met Onry Ozzborn, who would be a frequent collaborator of Mr. Hill's, with Onry eventually inviting Mr. Hill to join Oldominion.

Following encounters and discussions Grayskul had with Slug and other Rhymesayers Entertainment members, Grayskul's album Deadlivers was released on the label in 2005. Mr. Hill produced over half the album, taking on the Moniker "Phanton", while Onry Ozzborn took "Reason" and JFK to "Recluse".

In 2006, he released his first solo album, Snaps. The album features IAME, Boom Bap Project and Onry Ozzborn, among others. The same year he joined Oldominion rapper Barfly and released the album Nite Owls.

The next year, Mr. Hill released his first instrumental album The Darkest Hour via Hal Cush Music.

In 2011, he released the album SMiRK, an instrumental album mixing electronic, jazz and hip hop elements.

== Discography ==
Studio albums

- Snaps (2006)
- The Darkest Hour (2007)
- SMiRK (2011)

Collaborative albums

- Nite Owls (2006) (with Barfly)

EPs

- Night Time Dreamers (2013)

Productions

- Onry Ozzborn - "Listen & Learn", "The Ozz", "Legend Had It", "Poltergeist", "717" and "The Zone" from The Grey Area (2003)
- Sirens Echo - "Hands Together" from Psalms Of The Sirens (2004)
- Grayskul - "You People", "Adversarial Theatre Of Justice", "Action Figure Of Speech", "Once Upon A Time", "Do They Exist", "Vixen", "After Hours", "The Skul", "Prom Quiz", "Deadlivers" and "Secret Wars" from Deadlivers (2005)
- Boom Bap Project - "Sounds Of The Street" and "War Of Roses" from Reprogram (2005)
- Boom Bap Project - "The Struggle" from The Shakedown (2005)
- Coley Cole - "Goldplated Straitjackets" from Goldplated Straitjackets (2005)
- Onry Ozzborn - "Part 3", "Part 4" and "Educated Guess" from In Between (2005)
- Syndel - "Ring Side" from Enchantress (2006)
- Grayskul - "The Last Lullaby" from Bloody Radio (2007)
- Mr. Lif - "Presidential Report" (2008)
- Onry Ozzborn - "No Hoax" and "76" from No Hoax (2011)
- Destro - "That's That", "Yah, Yah, Yah" and "Oldominion Coming Thru" from ill.ustrated (2011)
- Onry Ozzborn - "Electric Dreams" from Hold On for Dear Life (2011)
