= Polarity (Norman album) =

Studio album by Norman
- Released: March 4, 2003
- Genres: Hip-hop, alternative hip-hop, Pacific Northwest hip-hop
- Length: 71:34
- Label: Under The Needle
- Producers: Onry Ozzborn, Smoke M2D6, Pale Soul

Professional ratings
Review scores
Source	Rating
Exclaim!	Favorable
Pitchfork	8.3/10

Polarity is a studio album by American hip-hop group Norman, consisting of rappers Onry Ozzborn and Barfly, both members of the Pacific Northwest hip-hop collective Oldominion. It was released on Under The Needle on March 4, 2003. The album is a rap opera concept album.

== Music ==
The album is mostly produced by Onry Ozzborn and Smoke M2D6, with contributions from Pale Soul. Guest appearances include Pale Soul, Hyena, Sulfur, Toni Hill, and MyG.

== Background ==
Polarity casts Onry Ozzborn and Barfly as the mind of a young man named Norman. Throughout the album, the rappers communicate as Norman's conscious, revealing him as the everyday loser, who continually faces depression and counts of aggression.

== Track listing ==
No.	Title	Producer	Length
1.	"Intro"		0:41
2.	"One Man Band"	Smoke M2D6	3:21
3.	"Pleasantville"	Onry Ozzborn	3:35
4.	"Normandy" (featuring Pale Soul)	Pale Soul	3:05
5.	"Human Traffic"	Onry Ozzborn	3:55
6.	"(I Can't Live Without My) Ghetto Blaster"	Onry Ozzborn	3:47
7.	"Weastwick United F.C."	Pale Soul	3:50
8.	"Hiphop.Ver.1.7"	Onry Ozzborn	3:53
9.	"Construction"	Onry Ozzborn	3:05
10.	"Bling Kong"	Onry Ozzborn	4:41
11.	"Easier"	Onry Ozzborn	3:58
12.	"Opiate" (featuring Hyena)	Onry Ozzborn	5:00
13.	"Hardheaded" (featuring Sulfur)	Smoke M2D6	4:01
14.	"Martyr" (featuring Toni Hill)	Smoke M2D6	4:16
15.	"Tony Perkins"	Onry Ozzborn	0:23
16.	"Rockstar Fraternity Initiation"	Onry Ozzborn	4:41
17.	"Drip"	Smoke M2D6	3:49
18.	"Mouthpiece (Hidden Track)" (featuring MyG)	Onry Ozzborn	11:42
