= Batsauce =

American musician

- Also known as: Batsauce
- Born: Britt Traynham
- Origin: Jacksonville, Florida, U.S.
- Genres: Underground hip hop Instrumental hip hop
- Occupation: Producer
- Years active: 2004–present
- Label: Galapagos4
- Website: www.batsauce.com

Britt Traynham, better known by his stage name Batsauce, is an underground hip hop producer from Jacksonville, Florida, who lives nomadically and is usually located in Berlin, Southeast Asia, or camping in the Northwest in his Volkswagen van. He is signed to Galapagos4 and has released several records with his wife Lady Daisey and with Typical Cats member Qwazaar.

== Discography ==
=== Solo ===
Albums

- Starcrossed (Galapagos4, 2012)

Mixtapes, beat tapes, etc.

- Pour It in Your Ear (2004)
- 1971 Instrumentals (2006)
- The Gypsy Diaries (2008)
- Spy vs Spy (2009)
- Summertime (2010)
- Bat Meets Blaine Instrumentals (2012)
- What Is a Batsauce? (2012)
- The Rudy Stevenson Remixes (2014)

=== Collaborations ===
Albums

- Party... Place. (Subcontact, 2007) (with The Smile Rays)
- Smilin' on You (Rawkus 50, 2007) (with The Smile Rays)
- In My Pocket (Barely Breaking Even, 2010) (with Lady Daisey)
- Bat Meets Blaine (Galapagos4, 2011) (with Qwazaar)
- In My Headphones (Barely Breaking Even, 2014) (with Lady Daisey)
- Bat Outta Hell (Galapagos4, 2014) (with Hellsent)
- What Have We Done (FP032, 2024) (with Dillon)

EPs

- Party... Place. EP (Subcontact, 2007) (with The Smile Rays)
- Cupid's Revenge (2010) (with Dillon)
- In My Pocket EP (Barely Breaking Even, 2010) (with Lady Daisey)
- Style Be the King (Galapagos4, 2011) (with Qwazaar)
- The New Blues Brothers EP (2013) (with Dillon & H2o)
- Stress Chasers (Galapagos4, 2014) (with Qwazaar)
- The Soledad Brothers (Galapagos4, 2014) (with WaX)

=== Production credits ===
- Dillon – "Without You (Aww Shit!)" & "D.I.Y." from Un-Cut (2007)
- Surreal – "The Surface" from Pardon My Dust (Subcontact, 2008)
- Surreal – "The Surface" from Pardon My Dust EP (Subcontact, 2009)
- Mr. Lif – "Welcome to the World", "What About Us?", "Breathe" & "Folklore" from I Heard It Today (Bloodbot Tactical Enterprises, 2009)
- Jedi Mind Tricks – "Folklore" from Greatest Features (Babygrande, 2009)
- Dillon – "Gimme That" from Dillon Ain't Playin' (2011)
- Loopez & Renegades of Jazz – "Jungle Haze (Batsauce Remix)" from Jungle Haze EP (Hiperbole, 2011)
- Sinks – "Curmudgeons" from Backlash (Down for the Count, 2013)
- Hellsent – "Strange Fiction" & "Free Shots" from Free Shots (2014)
