= Zavala (producer) =

- Born: Alexander Robert Zavala
- Origin: Chicago, Illinois
- Genres: Hip hop, electronica
- Occupation: Producer
- Years active: 2008-present
- Label: Fake Four Inc.
- Member of: Dark Time Sunshine
- Website: fakefourinc.com/artist/zavala

Alexander Robert Zavala, better known mononymously by his stage name Zavala, is an American hip hop and electronica record producer from Chicago, Illinois. He is a founding member of the hip hop duo Dark Time Sunshine alongside Onry Ozzborn.

== Musical career ==
Zavala first came to attention in 2009 when he released the collaborative album Canciones Modernas with PNS of Molemen. The same year, he produced numerous tracks on Sleep's album Hesitation Wounds, his debut on Strange Famous Records.

Through working with Sleep, he met Onry Ozzborn, who featured on Hesitation Wounds as Grayskul. The two soon became fans of each other's work and began working with each other, eventually leading to the creation of the duo Dark Time Sunshine. Together they released three albums in three years, one of which being Anx. For every album released, Zavala also released an instrumental version as well.

In 2017, he released his debut solo album named Fantasmas. The album is an instrumental mix of electronica and hip hop. The album was given generally favorable reviews, with Peter Ellman of Exclaim! saying: "For its exorcism of dark energies deftly balanced with efforts towards lightness, Fantasmas is a startlingly effective solo debut."

== Discography ==
Studio albums

- Fantasmas (2017)

Collaborative albums

- Canciones Modernas (2009)

Singles

- You Had To Be There 12" (2012)

Productions

- Robust - "Place To Be" and "Word Is Bond" from No Free Dope (2008)
- Robust - "Make It Look Easy", "Commercial Break", "Nightmare" and "Turn It Out" from The Close Up (2008)
- Sleep - "Bring It To Life" and "Sticks & Stones" from Christopher (2009)
- Grayskul - "Mars Voltage" from Graymaker (2009)
- The Chicharones - "Once Upon A Time" from Swine Country (2009)
- Sleep - "Day Dreamer", "Spent", "Hesitation Wounds", "Lothar" and "Roll Call" from Hesitation Wounds (2009)
- Robust - "G4 Anthem" from You Ain't Cold (2009)
- Onry Ozzborn - "Blend In" from Hold On For Dear Life (2011)
