= Bloody Radio =

Studio album by Grayskul
- Released: September 11, 2007
- Genre: Hip-hop
- Length: 55:39
- Label: Rhymesayers Entertainment
- Producers: North Czar; Coley Cole; Bean One; Smoke; Sapient; Aesop Rock; Mr. Hill; The Gigantics

Grayskul chronology
Deadlivers (2005)	Bloody Radio (2007)	Zenith (2013)

Singles from Bloody Radio
- 1. "Scarecrow" Released: 2007

Bloody Radio is a studio album by American hip-hop group Grayskul. It was released on Rhymesayers Entertainment in 2007. "Scarecrow" was released as a single from the album.

== Background ==
The album sees Onry Ozzborn rapping under the guise of Count Draven and JFK going by the moniker Count Magnus. Production is handled by Coley Cole, Sapient, Smoke, and Mr. Hill, among others.

== Critical reception ==
Professional ratings
Review scores
Source	Rating
AllMusic	3/5 stars
Drowned in Sound	5/10
Tiny Mix Tapes	3.5/5 stars
XLR8R	6/10

Nick Marx of Tiny Mix Tapes wrote, "Onry and JFK ground their abstractions throughout in a coherent attack on the contemporary hip-hop landscape." He added, "like any artist well-versed in the conventions of horror, the duo knows how to deliver superficial schlock while slipping in a message." Marisa Brown of AllMusic commented that "they're interested in the extremes of human experience, as if they don't really believe what they're saying, but that they like the way it sounds."

== Track listing ==
No.	Title	Producer(s)	Length
1.	"3000 Voices"	North Czar	2:09
2.	"Virginia N.M.2"	Coley Cole	3:22
3.	"Dope"	Bean One	3:53
4.	"Bloody Radio"	Smoke	3:50
5.	"How to Load a Tech" (featuring Cage)	Coley Cole	2:37
6.	"Missing" (featuring Andrea Zollo)	Smoke	4:13
7.	"Scarecrow"	Smoke	3:16
8.	"Haunted"	North Czar	2:49
9.	"The Office" (featuring Slug and Aesop Rock)	Sapient	4:06
10.	"Is It Me"	Sapient	3:49
11.	"Dance the Frantic" (featuring Pigeon John and Toni Hill)	Smoke	4:16
12.	"Give Me Love"	Aesop Rock	3:32
13.	"Us"		3:44
14.	"The Last Lullaby"	Mr. Hill	3:20
15.	"Heaven Is Still Coming..." / "Disappear"	Sapient; The Gigantics	6:35
Total length:			55:39

== Personnel ==
Credits adapted from liner notes.

- Onry Ozzborn – vocals
- JFK – vocals
- North Czar – production (1, 8)
- Coley Cole – production (2, 5)
- Bean One – production (3)
- J. "Candidt" Page – additional vocals (4)
- Smoke – production (4, 6, 7, 11)
- Cage – vocals (5)
- A.D.F. – additional vocals (5)
- Andrea Zollo – vocals (6)
- Slug – vocals (9)
- Aesop Rock – vocals (9), production (12)
- Sapient – production (9, 10, 15)
- Pigeon John – vocals (11)
- Toni Hill – vocals (11)
- Aleksandra Weil – additional vocals (12)
- Mr. Hill – production (14)
- The Gigantics – production (15)
- DJ Wicked – turntables
- Aaron Angus – recording, mixing
- Zebulon Dak - recording, mixing
