= Oregon Failure =

Studio album by Sleep
- Released: April 15, 2014
- Genre: Alternative hip-hop
- Length: 48:21
- Label: Strange Famous Records
- Producer: Maulskull

Sleep chronology
Hesitation Wounds (2009)	Oregon Failure (2014)

Professional ratings
Review scores
Source	Rating
RapReviews	7.5/10
Willamette Week	mixed

Oregon Failure is the fourth studio album by American rapper Sleep, a member of the Pacific Northwest hip-hop collective Oldominion. It was released on Strange Famous Records in 2014. The album is entirely produced by Maulskull, and it features guest appearances from Ceschi, Onry Ozzborn, and Pigeon John, among others.

== Music ==
Oregon Failure is entirely produced by Seattle producer Maulskull, and it features guest appearances from Ceschi, Xperience, Tony Ozier, Onry Ozzborn, Nyqwil of Oldominion and Pigeon John.

== Track listing ==
No.	Title	Length
1.	"Where Ya At"	2:59
2.	"It's Out of My Hands"	3:08
3.	"The Beat"	3:33
4.	"You Are Something Else"	3:13
5.	"Substances" (featuring Ceschi and Onry Ozzborn)	4:13
6.	"Here Inside" (featuring Nyqwil of Oldominion)	4:19
7.	"Trush Serum" (featuring Pigeon John)	4:05
8.	"I'm Sorry"	3:52
9.	"Tumbleweed" (featuring Xperience)	4:33
10.	"Sinking Ship"	3:45
11.	"You Ain't Shhh" (featuring Tony Ozier)	3:46
12.	"Rap Rehab"	3:41
13.	"Broke"	3:14
