= Denizen Kane =

American rapper

- Born: Dennis Kim; Chicago, Illinois, United States
- Origin: Chicago, Illinois, United States
- Genres: Underground hip-hop, alternative hip-hop
- Occupations: Rapper; poet
- Years active: 2000–present
- Label: Galapagos4, Tree City Music
- Formerly of: Typical Cats
- Website: Galapagos4

Dennis Sangmin Kim, better known by his stage name Denizen Kane, is an underground rapper and spoken word artist. Denizen Kane is co-founder of the underground rap crew Typical Cats, with fellow MCs Qwazaar and Qwel, and producers / DJs Kid Knish and DJ Natural. He is also a founding member of Asian-American spoken word group I Was Born with Two Tongues.

== Discography ==
Albums

- Typical Cats (2001) (with Typical Cats)
- Broken Speak (2003) (with I Was Born with Two Tongues)
- Civil Service (2004) (with Typical Cats)
- Tree City Legends Volume 2: My Bootleg Life (2005)
- Brother Min's Journey to the West (2009)
- 3 (2012) (with Typical Cats)
- Lost Tapes, Volume 1: Oh-Six (2017)

EPs

- Tree City Legends (2002)

Compilations

- Typical Bootlegs Volume 1 (2004) (with Typical Cats)

Singles

- "Easy Cause It Is" (2004) (with Typical Cats)
