= Qwazaar =

American rapper

- Also known as: StonedGiant
- Born: Marty Brown; Chicago, Illinois, United States
- Origin: Chicago, Illinois, United States
- Genres: Underground hip hop; alternative hip hop
- Occupation: Rapper
- Years active: 1998–present
- Labels: Galapagos4; Frontline Entertainment; Lefthouse Recordings; Dirty Digital; Infinite Entertainment
- Member of: Typical Cats, Dirty Digital, Outerlimitz
- Website: qwazaarmusic.com

Marty Brown, better known by his stage name Qwazaar (pronounced "quasar"), is an American rapper from Chicago, Illinois. Qwazaar is co-founder of the underground hip hop crew Typical Cats, with fellow MCs Denizen Kane and Qwel, and producers / DJs Kid Knish and DJ Natural. He is also a member of the group Outerlimitz, with rapper Hellsent and producer Silence. Qwazaar also collaborates with Silence under the name Dirty Digital, and has released several collaborative records with Florida-born, Berlin-based producer Batsauce.

== Discography ==
=== Albums ===
Qwazaar

- Walk Thru Walls (2001)
- Bat Meets Blaine (2011) (with Batsauce)

Typical Cats (Qwazaar with Denizen Kane, Qwel, DJ Natural & Kid Knish)

- Typical Cats (2001)
- Civil Service (2004)
- 3 (2012)

Outerlimitz (Qwazaar with Hellsent & Silence)

- Wrong Actions for Right Reasons (1998)
- Suicide Prevention (2005)

=== EPs, mixtapes, compilations, singles ===
EPs

- Walk Thru Walls (Revised Edition Tour EP) (2008)
- Shockah (2009) (with Silence, as Dirty Digital)
- Style Be the King (2011) (with Batsauce)
- Stress Chasers (2014) (with Batsauce)

Mixtapes

- Riverstyx Radio Vol. 1 (2009)
- Digitape Side A (2010) (with Silence, as Dirty Digital)
- Digitape Side B (2011) (with Silence, as Dirty Digital)

Remix albums

- Walk Thru Walls / Fame Revise (2010)
- Bat Meets Blaine: The Remixes (2012) (with Batsauce)

Compilations

- Typical Bootlegs Vol. 1 (2004) (with Typical Cats)
- Lost Prevention: Unreleased & B-Sides (2005) (with Outerlimitz)
- Fun Razors, Rarities & Hits (2011)

Singles

- "Desert Eagle / I Tried / T.T.G.P." (2001)
- "Easy Cause It Is" (2004) (with Typical Cats)
- "Packaged in Plastic / Hypnotic" (with Outerlimitz)
- "Sodapopinski" (2008) (with Dirty Digital)
- "I Know / Til It's Done" (2011) (with Batsauce)
