= Anx =

Studio album by Dark Time Sunshine
- Released: July 24, 2012
- Genre: Hip-hop
- Length: 51:39
- Label: Fake Four Inc.
- Producer: Zavala

Dark Time Sunshine chronology
Vessel (2009)	Anx (2012)

Professional ratings
Review scores
Source	Rating
Ghettoblaster Magazine	favorable
Okayplayer	89/100
Potholes in My Blog	4/5 stars
The Seattle Times	favorable
Sputnikmusic	4.5 (superb)
The Stranger	favorable
Syffal	10/10

Anx (short for "anxiety") is a studio album by the American hip-hop duo Dark Time Sunshine. It was released by Fake Four Inc. on July 24, 2012. It features guest appearances from the likes of P.O.S, Aesop Rock, and Busdriver. Music videos were created for "Never Cry Wolf", "Valiant", and "Take My Hand".

== Critical reception ==
Charles Mudede of The Stranger gave the album a favorable review, calling it "a masterpiece". Andrew Matson of The Seattle Times said: "Highlights are 'Prairie Dog Day' and 'Cultclass,' which sound like a sunset and a rainbow of oil on concrete, respectively." Impose included the album on the "Best Music of July 2012" list.

In 2015, City Pages placed "Overlordian" at number 3 on the "P.O.S's 10 Best Deep Cuts" list.

== Track listing ==
No.	Title	Length
1.	"Hosanna in the Highest" (featuring Ceschi)	2:07
2.	"Can't Wait"	3:43
3.	"Cultclass" (featuring Rochester A.P.)	4:22
4.	"Valiant" (featuring Child Actor)	4:38
5.	"Rock Off"	2:34
6.	"Overlordian" (featuring P.O.S)	4:24
7.	"Prairie Dog Day"	4:17
8.	"I'll Be Damned" (featuring Poeina Suddarth)	3:20
9.	"Look at What the Cat Did" (featuring Busdriver)	4:54
10.	"Never Cry Wolf" (featuring Reva Devito)	3:14
11.	"Take My Hand" (featuring Swamburger and Aesop Rock)	3:59
12.	"Forget Me Not" (featuring Child Actor)	2:39
13.	"Look Forward"	4:06
14.	"Anx" (featuring Mendee Ichikawa)	3:22
