= When Pigs Fly (The Chicharones album) =

Studio album by The Chicharones
- Released: August 30, 2005
- Genre: Alternative hip hop
- Length: 53:13
- Label: Camobear Records
- Producers: Pale Soul, Earthfiremusic, Vertigo, Foundation, Maker, Samix, Moves

The Chicharones chronology
When Pigs Fly (2005)	Swine Flew (2012)

Professional ratings
Review scores
Source	Rating
AllMusic	4.5/5 stars
Boise Weekly	favorable
IGN	7.3/10
RapReviews	8/10
Sputnikmusic	4/5 stars

When Pigs Fly is the first studio album by an alternative hip hop duo The Chicharones, consisting of Canadian rapper Josh Martinez and American rapper Sleep. It was released on Camobear Records in 2005.

== Music ==
When Pigs Fly features production from Pale Soul, EarthFireMusic, Vertigo, Foundation, Maker, Samix, and Moves.

== Track listing ==
No.	Title	Producer	Length
1.	"Intro"		0:59
2.	"Pork Rind Disco"	Pale Soul	3:34
3.	"Surf Rock"	Earthfiremusic	3:05
4.	"Little by Little"	Earthfiremusic	3:23
5.	"Breaking Point"	Earthfiremusic, Vertigo	4:08
6.	"Fiesta" (featuring Zelly Rock)	Earthfiremusic	4:18
7.	"Freeze Up"	Foundation	3:37
8.	"Ring Ring"	Maker	3:36
9.	"Bully Bully"	Earthfiremusic	4:31
10.	"Guys Like Me"	Earthfiremusic	4:07
11.	"Red Carpet Treatment"	Pale Soul	3:54
12.	"Can't Find the Time"	Earthfiremusic	4:32
13.	"Keep It Moving"	Samix	3:41
14.	"Take It Easy"	Moves	4:05
