= Diamondog =

Angolan rapper

- Also known as: Diamondog
- Born: Diamantino Edgar Capacassa Feijó; August 23, 1980 (age 46); Luanda, Angola
- Origin: Luanda
- Genre: Hip hop
- Occupations: Rapper, journalist
- Years active: 1998–present
- Labels: Phantanoise Records, Acla
- Website: myspace.com/mcdiamondog

Diamantino Edgar Capacassa Feijó (born August 23, 1980), better known as Diamondog, is an Angolan rapper. He is known for making political and conscious hip hop. Diamondog is a journalist, documentary filmmaker, and has a master's degree in visual media and anthropology from the Freie Universität Berlin.

== Biography ==
Rapper since 1998, Diamondog met the hip hop culture at the age 16 when he took a course in journalism at the Middle Institute of Economy of Luanda (IMEL). Influenced by friends and colleagues who already knew the hip hop culture the longest, Diamondog went from listener to the master of ceremony (MC).

Diamondog has been on tour in Barcelona in Spain and in Porto, Braga, Gaia and Matosinhos in Portugal. He has performed in concerts in Kraków in Poland and in Brazilian cities such as Rio de Janeiro, São Paulo, Salvador, Bahia, Curitiba and Belo Horizonte in the company of Afrika Bambaataa, Marcelo D2, Thaide dual Thaide and DJ Hum, Tianastacia, Wilson Sidereal, Leandro Ferrari, Marku Ribas, Black Sonora, Tambolele, Dj Primo, Olodum Creative School, Shameema - Godessa (South Africa) and many others.

The participations of Diamondog concerts include: Revolution Carnival (two editions), Pop Rock Brazil Festival 2004 in the company of Marcelo D2 and DJ Primo performing for more than 25 thousand people in the " Independence" stadium in Belo Horizonte (Brazil), Eletronika Festival at Belo Horizonte, Black Arts Festival at the invitation of Africa Bambaataa with whom he shared the stage twice, respectively in Brazil and Berlin, Germany, FILE (International Festival of Electronic Language), Bread and Butter in Barcelona, Coca-Cola Music Festival, Fetê de la Musique in Berlin 2008 and 2009, Karneval der Kulturen 2009, Wolfsburg Festival, among other events.

Diamondog currently lives in Berlin.

== Musical journey (chronological) ==
=== 1998: First steps ===
Together with the Angolan rapper MC Kamba, who lives now in Spain and who formed a duo in the past. Diamondog wrote his first song call “If You Want To Be Happy”. The song was first aired on the extinct program of Hip Hop at radio FM Express, which was presented by the host Moises Luis who was then the most heard in the Angolan capital.

=== 1999–2000: Political asylum in Brazil and Clandestino ===
Due to civil war in Angola which until then lasted 24 years, Diamondog moves to Brazil where he received political asylum. Soon his arrival in Brazil, he met Alexandre Lopes Muzzillo better known as DJ Primo, Jonathan o Gralha and Bill, who formed the group Blackout and with whom in contact, he immersed in the hip hop scene in Curitiba, the city where he lived after arriving in Brazil. In 2000 invited by the rapper Maskot from Curitiba, Diamondog wrote his first musical participation in Brazil, in a song produced by DJ Primo and featured also by the rapper Tio Fresh, from the rap group from São Paulo called, SP Funk. And Also in the same year, Diamondog form along with the Brazilian rapper Jazzrell AKA Mic Forté, the duo called Clandestino, which means family together by destiny.

=== 2004: A Tribute to Our Nations ===
In 2004 the duet Clandestino recorded an independent album which was titled: A Tribute to Our Nations. The disc included the special participation of the Rappers: Cubanito (Havana), Kunkalopi (Cape Verde), Kaio Estrao (USA), Toaster Eddie and Rena Engels, respectively from Brazil, and brought songs mostly related to the social issues and anti-war songs, with highlighted songs: Hands Wielding Pens and Spread the Peace.

=== 2005–2006: Comida de Comer and Compadres ===
In 2005 Diamondog was part of the CD Comida de Comer ("Food to Eat") philanthropic album organized by Podé Nastasia, which also participated musicians and groups such as Uakti, Marina Machado (Milton Nascimento backing vocal), Glauco Nastasia among others.

In the following year, invited by the musician Leandro Ferrari, to participate in the project Compadres, Diamondog took part in three tracks, one being with his partner, rapper Cubanito.

=== 2007: Arrebite/documentary/WFD/Input-Junkies ===
In 2007 at the invitation of the Brazilian producers Raul Costa and Rafael Ferreira Costa, Diamondog integrates the collective Arrebiter as MC and they record the Vinyl called also Arrebite, the same name of the group. The LP was released in Germany by Phantanoise Records and was distributed by Juno Records, Alphacut Records and by Sbmonline, simultaneously was featured in the British magazine specializing in electronic music XLR8R that released three tracks on their website.

In the same year, Diamondog was invited by photographer director Marcelo Trotta (City of God), he participated in the documentary film Beyond Coffee Oil and Diamonds that competed in festivals, won the prize for best director at the Festival of Pernambuco and Honorable Mention at the Human Rights Festival of São Paulo.

In mid-2007 Diamondog moved to Berlin at the invitation of the German NGO WFD (Weltfriedensdienst) Service for World Peace, to do workshops in Poland and Germany showing the youths that Hip Hop can be a powerful tool to express oneself and resolve conflict.

Also in 2007 Diamondog was part of the project "Input-Junkies and recorded together with the South African rapper Shameema, from the well known group Godessa, the song International Monkey Business, portraying in an ironic way the ignorance of many Westerners about the African continent.

=== 2008: Malucofonia ===
Although he recorded in Brazil in 2007 the music (Eu quero uma dama) "I want a lady", a homage to the black women, only in 2008 it was released, by the label Acla in the compilation Malucofonia.

=== 2009: Volkswagen Sound Foundation and Nomadic Wax ===
In 2009 the Diamondog's work gained recognition by being chosen with his band - DJ Werd (scratches), Steffen Scholz (keyboards), Lars Rüetschi (guitar), Stefan Fuhr (bass), Daniel Allen (trumpet) und Jan Pfennig (drums) - as one of the artists of the year 2009 by Volkswagen. So Diamondog was sponsored through the project, Volkswagen Sound Foundation, which in addition to various artistic incentives, he received a mini bus for touring over a period of one year.

Also in 2008 at the invitation of American label Nomadic Wax, Diamondog recorded together with DJ Werd, the song "Alexis Sinduhije Needs freedom" to promote the release of the Burundi journalist Alexis Sinduhije, named by Time magazine, one of the 100 most influential people of 2008.

=== 2010: Hip hop evolution in the world and Coptic ===
In early 2010 Diamondog was included by BBC on the map on the hip hop evolution in the world. On the map of Angola Diamondog interprets the song "Time and Money" about corruption and greed of human beings, facing chronic poverty that surround the world. The song was produced by German rapper and producer LMNZ and was also featured U.S. R&B and soul singer Lady Daisey.

In 2010 Diamondog has confirmed participation in the album's producer was Coptic, which has in curriculum productions for rappers like Notorious BIG, P. Diddy, KRS-One, Buckshot, G-Dep, Jermaine Dupri among others. The album is still in works and will be called Close to my Roots. It aims to put African and American rappers together in the same tracks.

Currently Diamondog is working on his first solo album, with no predicted release date, which probably will be called Never Muzzled and will probably be in English.

== Discography/compilations and featurings ==
- Clandestino - Um Tributo às Nossas Nações 2004
- Coletania - Comida de Comer 2005
- Input - Junkies 2007
- Arrebite 2007
- Malucofonia 2008
- Mixtape - Democracy in Burundi 2008
- Gimme my Microphone Check 2009
- LMNZ - Hip Hop World Wide 2010
