= Midriff Music =

Studio album by Josh Martinez
- Released: September 22, 2005
- Genres: Alternative hip hop, hip hop
- Length: 45:50
- Label: Camobear Records
- Producer: Samix

Josh Martinez chronology
Buck Up Princess (2000)	Midriff Music (2005)	When Pigs Fly (2005)

Professional ratings
Review scores
Source	Rating
AllMusic	3.5/5 stars
Exclaim!	favorable

Midriff Music is a studio album by Canadian hip hop artist Josh Martinez. It was released on Josh Martinez's independent label Camobear Records on September 22, 2005. The album won Best Rap-Hip-Hop Recording at the Western Canadian Music Awards of 2005.

== Music ==
The album is entirely produced by South California producer Samix. It features one guest verse from Kunga 219.

== Track listing ==
No.	Title	Length
1.	"Intro"	2:14
2.	"Cheers"	4:32
3.	"Regular Day"	2:57
4.	"Tranzar"	2:57
5.	"Come and Gone"	4:37
6.	"Tour Is War"	4:26
7.	"Time Alone"	4:48
8.	"Just a Dood"	3:54
9.	"One More Sucka"	4:53
10.	"Played Out" (featuring Kunga 219)	4:17
11.	"Nightmare"	5:16
