= Portland Hip Hop Week =

Annual festival in Portland, Oregon, U.S.

- Logo
- Status: Active
- Frequency: Annually
- Location: Portland, Oregon
- Country: United States
- Inaugurated: 2015
- Website: pdxhiphopweek.com

Portland Hip Hop Week (PHHW) is an annual hip-hop festival in Portland, Oregon, United States. Established in 2015, the event was founded "to bridge tensions between local government and rappers", according to the Portland Mercury. David "D.J. O.G. One" Jackson is a co-founder. Portland DJ "Star Chile" was also a co-founder. PHHW highlights rising artists and has various activities including an awards ceremony (PDX Star Awards), dance parties, rap battles, professional development opportunities, and workshops.

Among activities for PHHW in 2019 was a showcase at Kelly's Olympian and other events at Cathedral Park and Lola's Room. The 2020 event was mostly virtual because of the COVID-19 pandemic. Changes were also made to the 2021 festival for the same reason. The group Boom Bap Project performed at the 2021 event. The event "Mic Check" kicked off the 2023 festival. Among events for PHHW in 2024 was "Beat Down", a showcase for producers at the music venue and restaurant Alberta Street Pub. The 2025 festival had events at Director Park, the music venue Holocene, and the Oaks Park Roller Skating Rink at Oaks Amusement Park. The 2026 event expanded into the suburbs of Beaverton and Gresham. It kicked off with a block party in front of Portland City Hall, featuring DJs O.G. One and Klyph as well as rappers Mighty, Tia P, and Mikey Vegaz.

The Kidz Outside Festival, established between 2019 and 2022, has been sanctioned as a PHHW event. PHHW has also collaborated with other hip-hop initiatives. The 2026 event '503 Rising: Hip Hop Showcase' was held at Beaverton's Patricia Reser Center for the Arts in collaboration with PHHW and Education WithOut Borders.

== See also ==
- Culture of Portland, Oregon
- Hip-hop culture
- List of festivals in the United States
- List of hip-hop festivals
- Northwestern hip-hop
