= IAME =

IAME may refer to:

- Industrias Aeronáuticas y Mecánicas del Estado, an Argentinian state-run automotive and aeronautical manufacturing company
- International Academy of Management and Economics, a private business school in the Philippines
- Italian American Motor Engineering, a manufacturer of small engines for karts

== See also ==
- Iame (rapper), American rapper
