= Resurrection (Criminal Nation album) =

Studio album by Criminal Nation
- Released: April 3, 2000
- Recorded: 1999
- Genre: Hip hop
- Label: Ocean Records
- Producer: Eugenius/M.A.S.

Criminal Nation chronology
Trouble in the Hood (1992)	Resurrection (2000)

Resurrection is the third and final album released by rap group, Criminal Nation. It was released on April 3, 2000 for Ocean Records and was produced by Eugenius and several tracks by M.A.S.. This marked the group's first album since 1992's Trouble in the Hood, however the reunion would prove to be short lived as the group would disband a second time after the album's release.

== Track listing ==
1. "Intro"- :36
2. "Criminal Love"- 3:34
3. "Stand the Rain"- 4:24
4. "Take a Flight"- 3:21
5. "Under Pressure"- 4:02
6. "Fuck Being Down"- 5:07
7. "So Real"- 4:33
8. "Demons Dwell"- 5:45
9. "A Thin Line"- 5:09
10. "Fortune over Fame"- 3:54
11. "The Break Down"- 4:50
12. "Can I Please Hit?"- 4:50
13. "That's Fa Sho"- 4:58
