= Criminal Nation =

American hip hop group

- Origin: Tacoma, Washington
- Genres: West Coast hip hop, gangsta rap, alternative hip hop, Northwest hip hop
- Years active: 1990–1992, 2000
- Labels: Nastymix Records
- Members: D-Rob; Spade; Bumpy; Wojack; MC Deff; Clee-Bone; Eugenius

Criminal Nation was an American hip-hop group whose members included D-Rob, Spade, Bumpy, MC Deff/Wojack, D-Wiz, Clee-Bone and Eugenius.

The group was active from 1990 to 1992 and then briefly in 2000.

AllMusic's Ron Wynn noted about the band's 1992 studio album, Trouble in the Hood, "They failed, at least on this disc, to creatively separate themselves from the legions of gangsta types telling identical drive-by shooting stories, and making the same macho statements about their sexual prowess and the failings of most women to understand or satisfy them."

== Discography ==
- 1990: Release the Pressure Nastymix Records
- 1992: Trouble in the Hood Nastymix Records
- 2000: Resurrection Ocean Records
