= Alaskan hip-hop =

Rap music genre

- Other names: Alaskan Drill Rap
- Stylistic origins: Hip-hop; Gangsta rap; Trap; Drill; West Coast hip-hop
- Cultural origins: 1997–present; Alaska
- Typical instruments: Bass; drum machine; sampler; synthesizer

Regional scenes
- Anchorage; Fairbanks; Juneau

Local scenes
- Fairview; Mountain View

Alaskan hip-hop is a resurgent subgenre of hip-hop within the state of Alaska, primarily in the metropolitan areas of Anchorage and Fairbanks, and to a lesser extent Juneau. Despite its remote location, since the late 1970s, Alaska has had a steady growth in population, including its African American community; some observers describing the state as a melting pot of numerous cultures from across the continental United States.

== Background ==
Alaska as a whole has seen a steady increase in population across its metropolitan areas since the late 1970s. Despite the predominantly white ethnic background; communities of African-Americans, Pacific Islanders, and Hispanics have seen a notable rise as they emigrate from the continental United States in search of stable employment.

== First wave ==
In parallel with Alaska's cultural renaissance, crime began to grow in numerous pockets of Anchorage in the 1990s and 2000s. As was similarly the key influence in such genres as gangsta rap and hardcore hip-hop, artists such as 'Out Tha Cut (ODC)', 'Baydilla' or 'Joker the Bailbondsman' with ties to known drug traffickers began to see a flourishing first wave scene of underground hip-hop among Anchorage's black population in the late 1990s. The growth in the scene was ever present as Anchorage's crime began to increase with the growth in population.

By the late 2000s, Anchorage's rap scene began to decline as federal attention began to shift towards numerous arrests in connection to crimes ranging from drug trafficking and murders.

== Second wave ==
Despite the decline of Alaska's first wave of hip-hop, a new wave soon emerged in the late 2010s with numerous artists exhibiting influences from across the United States as Alaska's population continued to grow with incentives for employment and residence. The second wave of artists such as 'Tayy Tarantino', 'Alaska Redd', 'F03 Bear', 'F03 Fazo', 'Baby Cisco' and 'Fairview Huna' began to incorporate influences of trap, Mumble rap and Drill in a modern interpretation of the original sound.

The resurgence in growth was not solely limited to Anchorage as Juneau also saw a rise in its own rap scene. Rappers of Tlingit descent have mixed phrases and elements of their ethnic music and language into their own expression of hip-hop.

== See also ==
- Canadian hip-hop
- Hip-hop in the Pacific Northwest
- Music of Alaska
- Native American hip-hop
