= The Chicharones =

American hip hop group

- Origin: Portland, Oregon, Vancouver, British Columbia, Canada
- Genre: Rap music
- Years active: 2001–present
- Label: Camobear Records
- Members: Josh Martinez; Sleep

The Chicharones are an American/Canadian alternative hip hop duo, composed of Sleep of Oldominion and Josh Martinez, and are usually accompanied by DJ Zone. They are known for their socially conscious lyrics, energetic live performances, and strong underground following.

== History ==
The Chicharones formed in 2001 after a chance meeting between Oregon-based Sleep and Vancouver-based Josh Martinez at the South by Southwest music festival in Austin, Texas. Sleep was at the time a member of the hip hop collective Oldominion, of which he is still an active collaborator. Josh Martinez entered the duo from a career as a solo artist. Their name is a reference to chicharrones, a fried pork rind snack popular in Latin America and Spain.

The duo debuted with the Boss Hogs EP in 2003. The EP garnered critical praise, with URB magazine describing it as "a completely original masterpiece."

They did not immediately release a full album, however, instead dedicating their energy to touring and developing a fan base. At their peak, Martinez and Sleep delivered over two-hundred international performances a year, with shows involving Elvis-inspired high kicks, fake moustaches and costume changes, including a tribute to Mario and Luigi of the Nintendo franchise. Technically, they incorporated bass machines, two-part harmony and live drum sets. The Chicharones' dedication to touring eventually led to an international underground following. Spin magazine described the duo as "the best bar band in America," delivering an "innovative and entirely unique hybrid of clever pop melodies and intelligent, layered songwriting that [borrowed] from everywhere and [sounded] like nothing else."

The Chicharones released their second EP, Pork Rind Music, in 2005, and followed with their debut full-length album, When Pigs Fly, later that year. When Pigs Fly resulted in a music video for the track "Breaking Point," which followed the struggles of a young Mexican traveller driven to drinking and theft in a rural desert town. In 2006, Sleep and Martinez began focusing on solo projects.

The Chicharones have shared the road and stage with acts including Streetlight Manifesto, Pigeon John, Mickey Avalon, Lionize, Rodney Blake Powell and many others. They also were on the Warped Tour 2012 where they headlined "The Bring It Back Stage" and played multiple dates on "The Ernie Ball Stage."

== Recent work ==
After a three-year hiatus, the pair rejoined in 2009. Their first release was Swine Country, a work Martinez described as "inspired by James Dean, heist movies, broken hearts and sweet, sweet revenge." The Chicharones again garnered critical recognition, including an Independent Music Award in 2009 for best rap album and a Northwest Music Award for Best Live Band.

The pair continued to be prolific in the studio, releasing Swine Flew Over the Coocoo's Nest and Toke City Special in 2010. Toke City Special was released as a digital free album, available at their website.

The single "Hi Hey Hello" was featured in a Brazilian Samsung Galaxy S4 Commercial, released June 12, 2013.

== South by Southwest and commercial work ==
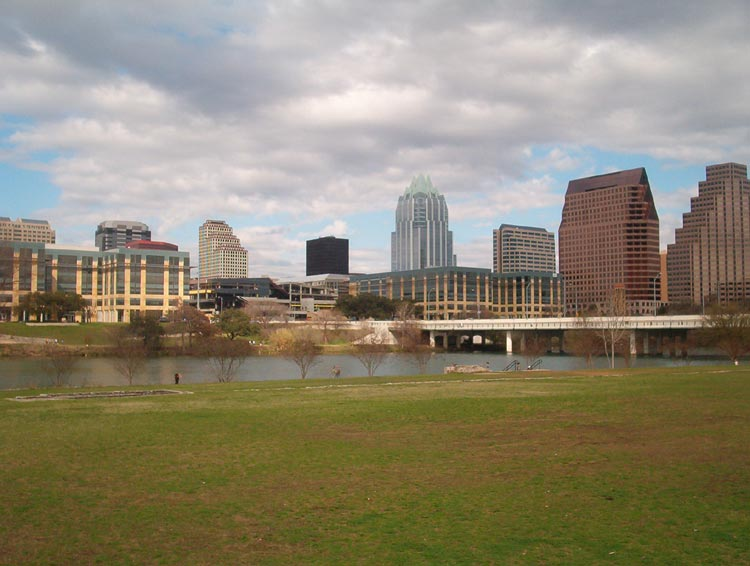
The Chicharones have played at South by Southwest music festival in Austin, Texas yearly, since their formation there in 2001.

The Chicharones have played at the South by Southwest music festival each consecutive year since their formation there in 2001. In 2010, they hosted the 4th annual South by Southwest Chicharones Boat Party with Solillaquists of Sound, Killah Priest, Blueprint and Illogic. Outside of their live performances, they have licensed multiple songs for action sports videos, including Fuel TV, Warren Miller’s Ski Series, Solomon Riders Guide and the Red Bull Action Sports Series. They have also licensed songs for television shows, including The Hills, Entourage, Flavor of Love 2, VH1’s Beach Party 2009, and movies such as Live Free or Die Hard and Interview.

== Discography ==
Albums

- When Pigs Fly (2005)
- Swine Flew (2012)

EPs

- Boss Hogs EP (2003)
- Pork Rind Disco EP (2005)
- Swine Country (2009)

Mixtapes

- Por Que? (Pork Eh?) (2012)

Compilations

- Toke City Special (2010)

Live

- On and Cracklin' (2006)
- Live in Bozeman, MT (2009)
