= Release the Pressure (album) =

Studio album by Criminal Nation
- Released: 1990
- Recorded: 1990
- Genre: Hip hop
- Length: 49:49
- Label: Nastymix
- Producer: Eugenius, Womack

Criminal Nation chronology
Release the Pressure (1990)	Trouble in the Hood (1992)

Professional ratings
Review scores
Source	Rating
AllMusic	4.5/5 stars

Release the Pressure is the debut album by the American rap group Criminal Nation. It was released in 1990 for Nastymix Records and was produced by the group's producers, Eugenius and Womack. The album peaked at No. 73 on the Billboard charts' Top R&B/Hip-Hop Albums and also featured the hit single "Insane", which made it to No. 17 on the Hot Rap Singles. The video for another single, "Black Power Nation", gained some airplay.

== Track listing ==
1. "Positively Funky"- 4:47
2. "Black Power Nation"- 3:42
3. "The Right Crowd"- 3:05
4. "Insane"- 3:57
5. "I'm Rollin'"- 5:22
6. "My Laboratory"- 4:24
7. "Violent Sound"- 2:48
8. "Release the Pressure"- 5:18
9. "Definitely Down for Trouble"- 4:49
10. "Criminal Hit"- 3:34
11. "Mission of Murder"- 4:35
12. "Take No Prisoners"- 3:28
