= Zenith (Grayskul album) =

Studio album by Grayskul
- Released: September 17, 2013
- Genre: Hip-hop
- Length: 63:15
- Label: Fake Four Inc.
- Producers: Smoke M2D6; 6 Fingers; Void Pedal; Taco Neck; Pale Soul; Bruce Waine Beatz; Kuddie Fresh; Aesop Rock; Marcus D

Grayskul chronology
| Bloody Radio (2007) | Zenith (2013) |

Zenith is a studio album by American hip-hop group Grayskul. It was released on Fake Four Inc. on September 17, 2013.

== Critical reception ==
Professional ratings
Review scores
| Source | Rating |
|---|---|
| Beats per Minute | 73/100 |
| Potholes in My Blog | 3.5/5 stars |
| The Stranger | favorable |

Chul Gugich of Beats per Minute gave the album a 73 out of 100, saying, "Grayskul has done its part in keeping Seattle hip hop weird and unpredictable." Kyle Fleck of The Stranger described it as "a sprawling collection of 17 tracks that broadens Grayskul's core aesthetic while maintaining their trademark dark humor and densely packed wordplay, with a diverse set of beats of a quality befitting the upper echelon of the underground." Azaria C. Podplesky of Seattle Weekly stated that "a variety of lyrical content and futuristic beats keep things interesting."

== Track listing ==
| No. | Title | Producer(s) | Length |
|---|---|---|---|
| 1. | "Zenith" (featuring Raekwon) | Smoke M2D6 | 4:13 |
| 2. | "Come On" | 6 Fingers | 2:27 |
| 3. | "The Gift" (featuring Reva DeVito) | Void Pedal | 3:57 |
| 4. | "We Vanish" | Taco Neck | 3:29 |
| 5. | "I Adapt" (featuring Solillaquists of Sound and NyQwil) | Void Pedal | 3:53 |
| 6. | "Apollo 11" | Smoke M2D6 | 3:53 |
| 7. | "My Goodness" | Taco Neck | 3:33 |
| 8. | "Clubs" (featuring Katie Kate and Thaddeus) | Pale Soul | 4:31 |
| 9. | "Wide Awake" (featuring Themes and David Lincoln Mann) | Bruce Waine Beatz | 3:35 |
| 10. | "Face & the Fang" | Bruce Waine Beatz | 3:51 |
| 11. | "There Is No Edge" (featuring Ali Baker) | Smoke M2D6 | 4:21 |
| 12. | "Bad Business" (featuring Xperience) | Kuddie Fresh | 3:29 |
| 13. | "Not Going Anywhere" (featuring Aesop Rock) | Aesop Rock | 2:55 |
| 14. | "Maggot" | Smoke M2D6 | 3:14 |
| 15. | "Electric Gray" | Void Pedal | 3:48 |
| 16. | "U.F.O." (featuring Snafu) | Void Pedal | 4:20 |
| 17. | "Merry Days" | Marcus D | 3:46 |
| Total length: | | | 63:15 |

== Personnel ==
Credits adapted from liner notes.

- Onry Ozzborn – vocals
- JFK – vocals
- Raekwon – vocals (1)
- Smoke M2D6 – production (1, 6, 11, 14)
- DJ Spark – turntables (2)
- 6 Fingers – production (2)
- Reva DeVito – vocals (3)
- Void Pedal – production (3, 5, 15, 16)
- Taco Neck – production (4, 7)
- Solillaquists of Sound – vocals (5)
- NyQwil – vocals (5)
- Katie Kate – vocals (8)
- Thaddeus – vocals (8)
- Pale Soul – production (8)
- Themes – vocals (9), synthesizer (9)
- David Lincoln Mann – vocals (9)
- Bruce Waine Beatz – production (9, 10)
- Ali Baker – vocals (11), violin (11), guitar (11)
- Xperience – vocals (12)
- Kuddie Fresh – production (12)
- Aesop Rock – vocals (13), production (13)
- Snafu – vocals (16)
- Marcus D – production (17)
- Zebulon Dak – mixing, mastering
- Adam Garcia – art direction, design, illustration
- Terrance Creighton – photography
