= Dark Time Sunshine =

American hip-hop duo

- Also known as: DTS
- Origin: Seattle, Washington, U.S.
- Genre: Hip-hop
- Years active: 2009-present
- Label: Fake Four Inc.
- Members: Onry Ozzborn; Zavala
- Website: www.fakefourinc.com

Dark Time Sunshine (abbreviated as DTS) is an American hip-hop duo, consisting of Seattle rapper Onry Ozzborn and Chicago producer Zavala. The group is signed to Fake Four Inc.

== History ==
Dark Time Sunshine was formed in 2009 when Onry Ozzborn met Zavala through Onry's fellow Oldominion member, Sleep. The group has been described as the combination of Zavala's experimental electronic and soulful production and Onry Ozzborn's insightful storytelling and multi-syllabic and internal rhymes.

The group released Believeyoume for free download in 2009, then Vessel and Conucopia in 2010. In 2012, the group released a studio album, Anx. It received favorable reviews from Okayplayer, The Seattle Times, and The Stranger.

In 2021, the duo returned with a studio album, Lore. It featured guest appearances from Ceschi, R.A.P. Ferreira, Homeboy Sandman, and Hail Mary Mallon.

== Discography ==
=== Studio albums ===
- Believeyoume (2009) (free download)
- Vessel (2010)
- Cornucopia (2010) (limited edition tour CD)
- Anx (2012)
- Lore (2021)

=== Singles ===
- "Adultland / Oh But of Course" (2010)
- "Ayemen" (2020)
- "Familiars" (2021)
