= Toni Hill =

Spanish author (born 1966)

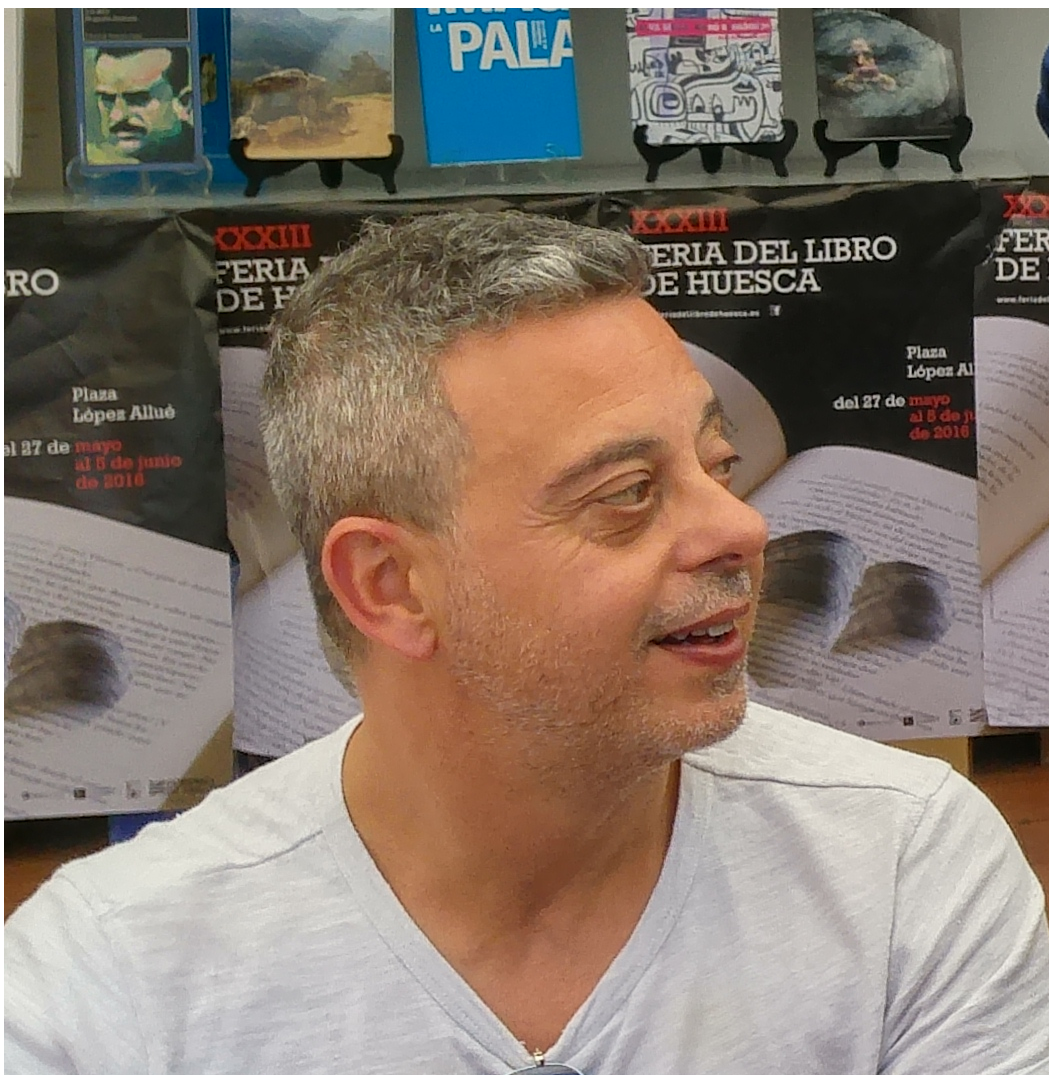
Toni Hill

Toni Hill is a Spanish author. His first novel, El verano de los juguetes muertos (The summer of the dead toys), has had a great success and it has received many excellent reviews.

Toni Hill was born in 1966 in Barcelona, Spain. He has a bachelor's degree in psychology. He has worked for over ten years as a literary translator with Random House Mondadori, S.A., a leading Spanish language publisher.

Some of the authors he has translated are David Sedaris, Jonathan Safran Foer, Glenway Wescott, Rosie Alison, Peter May, Rabih Alameddine and A. L. Kennedy. His work as a translator was a great help in writing his first novel, as it exposed him to many books and diverse writing techniques.

He has always been a supporter of thriller novels, and has read Agatha Christie’s books since he was a child.

El verano de los juguetes muertos (The summer of the dead toys) is his first novel, and is a detective novel. It was released in July 2011. Translation rights have been purchased in Germany, France, Greece, Italy, the Netherlands, Finland and Poland. The novel takes place in the current Barcelona and has diverse themes: guilt, revenge, sin and crime. More than 25000 copies of the novel were sold in the first two months. Toni Hill has stated that he spent six months thinking about what to write, and then six months writing the novel.

At this moment, Hill is writing the second part of the story.
