= Trouble in the Hood =

Studio album by Criminal Nation
- Released: 1992
- Recorded: 1992
- Genre: Hip hop
- Length: 65:44
- Label: Nastymix Records
- Producer: Eugenius, Womack

Criminal Nation chronology
Release the Pressure (1990)	Trouble in the Hood (1992)	Resurrection (2000)

Professional ratings
Review scores
Source	Rating
Allmusic	link

Trouble in the Hood is the second album released by rap group, Criminal Nation. It was released in 1992 for Nastymix Records and was produced by the group's producers, Eugenius and Mark Womack its lead rapper, MC Deff. Trouble in the Hood peaked at #75 on the Billboard charts' Top R&B/Hip-Hop Albums and featured the bass guitar work of Matt McClinton and also synthesizer and keyboard work of producer/musician M.A.S.. It would also be the group's last album for another eight years until 2000's Resurrection.

== Track listing ==
1. "Intro" – 1:02
2. "Trouble in the Hood" – 3:41
3. "You Can't Fuck with It" – 4:14
4. "Excuse Me Mr. Officer" (Fed Up) – 4:19
5. "No Shame" – 4:30
6. "Just Loungin'" – 4:52
7. "Pierce County Gangster" – 4:00
8. "When the Homies Come to Play" – 3:03
9. "Sex" – 2:36
10. "Criminal Love" – 4:27
11. "We Can't Stand These Bitches" – 4:49
12. "Lifestyles of the Nation" – 5:31
13. "The Bum Rush" – 3:56
14. "6 Down Deep" – 6:16
15. "Sick to the Brain" – 3:21
16. "Order Now Punk" – 2:39
17. "Criminal Reprise" – 3:12
