= Lady Daisey =

American singer

- Born: Daisey Traynham; June 9, 1973 (age 53); Brooklyn, New York, United States
- Origin: Jacksonville, Florida, United States
- Genres: Soul, funk
- Occupations: Singer, web designer
- Years active: 1995–present
- Labels: bbe, Subcontact, Rawkus, Jakarta
- Website: www.daisey.com/2025

Daisey Traynham, known by the stage name Lady Daisey, is a Brooklyn-born soul/funk singer. She spent her childhood touring with her parents’ band, and years later she settled in Jacksonville, Florida, where she met her husband/producer, Batsauce. They currently live in Europe and tour the States once a year.

== Discography ==
Albums

- In My Headphones (2014) bbe, (with Batsauce)
- In My Pocket (2010) bbe, (with Batsauce)
- Party... Place (2007) Subcontact, (the Smile Rays)
- Smilin' On You (2007) Rawkus 50, (the Smile Rays)
- Lady Daisey & the House Guests (2007) Self released, (with Batsauce)
- Passion Is The Key (2006) Self released, (with Batsauce)
- Room For Two (2004) Self released, (with Batsauce)

EPs

- In My Pocket – 12" vinyl EP' (2010) bbe, (with Batsauce)
- A Toast – 12" vinyl EP (2007) Jakarta, (the Smile Rays)
- Party... Place – 12" vinyl EP (2007) Subcontact, (the Smile Rays)

Singles

- "Get Got" (2014) (bbe, featuring George Clinton)
- "We Will" (2014) (bbe, with Batsauce)
- "Soul Strut" (2010) (bbe, with Batsauce)
- "Magical" (2010) (bbe, with Batsauce)

Remix albums

- Magical (2010) (with Batsauce, DJ Vadim, Paten Locke, Supa Dave West)

Compilations

- Musicians for Minneapolis (2008) (Benefit CD featuring "Fresh Tradition")
- Liquid Soul (2008) (Orama Entertainment)
- Digital Underground (2008) (featuring "Chicken")

Mixtapes

- Ladies First (2010) (Katie Bee)
