= Josh Martinez =

American rapper

- Josh Martinez performing in 2005

Background information
- Born: Matthew Edward Kimber; August 6, 1977 (age 49)
- Genres: Alternative hip-hop; indie hip-hop
- Occupations: Rapper; singer; record executive; record producer
- Labels: Camobear Records; Bella Union
- Website: http://www.joshmartinez.ca

Matthew Edward Kimber (born August 6, 1977), better known by his stage name Josh Martinez, is a Canadian rapper, record producer and record label executive. In the early 2000s, Martinez started his own label, Camobear Records. Josh Martinez was once named by Urb Magazine as one of its "Next 100 Rising Stars".

== Career ==
In addition to pursuing a solo career, Martinez is a founding member of both the Chicharones and the Pissed Off Wild. The Chicharones is an underground pop and hip-hop project in collaboration with rapper Sleep of Oldominion, following a chance meeting between the two at South By Southwest that led to the eventual formation of the group. The Pissed Off Wild, (or the P.O.W.), is a live rock band which Martinez fronts. Musically the band draws from artists such as 333 Foreign and Beck.

His solo album, Midriff Music, produced by Southern California DJ Samix, won Best Rap-Hip Hop Recording at the Western Canadian Music Awards of 2005. After the success of his many solo albums and Chicharones material, he proceeded to work on material for his follow-up solo album, World Famous Sex Buffet. Working with some of his regular production partners, he also enlisted the help of some notable guests artists whom he had met over the years. These include Devin The Dude, Classified, Pigeon John, indie rock band Mother Mother, Sleep and Awol One. Touring the world, Martinez has shared the stage and road with acts such as Sage Francis, Sole and Alias of Anticon.

Martinez currently resides in Portland, Oregon.

== Discography ==
=== Studio albums ===
- The Cracker (1998) (with Crackbeat Society)
- Josh Martinez & the Hooded Fang (1999)
- Made in China (2000)
- Buck Up Princess (2003)
- Midriff Music (2005)
- When Pigs Fly (2005) (with Sleep, as The Chicharones)
- Splitsville (2007) (with DJ Moves & Awol One)
- The World Famous Sex Buffet (2008)
- Pissed Off Wild (2011)
- Swine Flew (2012) (with Sleep, as The Chicharones)
- Blotto (2013)

=== EPs ===
- Maximum Wellbeing (1998)
- Rumble Pie (2002)
- The Good Life (2002)
- Boss Hogs EP (2003) (with Sleep, as The Chicharones)
- Pork Rind Disco EP (2005) (with Sleep, as The Chicharones)
- Skullduggery (2008)
- Swine Country (2009) (with Sleep, as The Chicharones)

=== Mixtapes ===
- Por Que? (Pork Eh?) (2012) (with Sleep, as The Chicharones)

=== Compilations ===
- Low Pressure The Compilation (with DJ Moves) (2001)
- A Trash Up (2006)
- Toke City Special (2010) (with Sleep, as The Chicharones)

=== Live ===
- On and Cracklin' (2006) (with Sleep, as The Chicharones)
- Live in Bozeman, MT (2009) (with Sleep, as The Chicharones)

=== Singles ===
- Offbeats 7" Series Vol. 1 (2002) (with Omid)
- Hard Fall (2004)
- Nightmares Remix (2005)

=== Appears on ===
- Factor Chandelier – "The Leen" from Chandelier (2008)
- Noah23 – "Moon Landing" from Rock Paper Scissors (2008)
- Factor – "PopStravaganza" from Lawson Graham (2010)
- Factor – "Where I'm at Now" from Old Souls Vol. 2 (2010)
- " Drive Thru" from Raise the Bridges "Beauty in the Trenches"(2011)
