= Typical Cats =

American hip-hop group

- Origin: Chicago, Illinois, United States
- Genres: Underground hip-hop, Chicago hip-hop
- Years active: 2000–present
- Label: Galapagos4
- Members: Denizen Kane; DJ Natural; Kid Knish; Qwazaar; Qwel

Typical Cats is an American underground hip-hop group from Chicago, Illinois. The group consists of MCs Denizen Kane, Qwazaar and Qwel, and producers / DJs Kid Knish and DJ Natural. They have released three albums to date. Their song "Any Day" from their self-titled debut was featured in the video game Tony Hawk's Project 8.

== Discography ==
Albums

- Typical Cats (2001)
- Civil Service (2004)
- 3 (2012)

Compilations

- Typical Bootlegs Volume 1 (2004)

Singles

- "Easy Cause It Is" (2004)
