= Typical Cats (album) =

Studio album by Typical Cats
- Released: February 6, 2001
- Recorded: 2000–2001
- Genre: Underground hip-hop
- Length: 45:35
- Label: Galapagos4
- Producer: DJ Natural, Kid Knish, Meaty Ogre

Typical Cats chronology
Typical Cats (2001)	Civil Service (2004)

Professional ratings
Review scores
Source	Rating
Hip Hop Infinity	link at the Wayback Machine (archived April 21, 2003)
Rap Reviews	link
Big Smile Magazine	(Very positive) link
Urban Smarts	(70%) link
Rap Music	link
Review Hip Hop	(90%) link

Typical Cats is the self-titled debut studio album by underground hip-hop group Typical Cats. It was released on February 6, 2001, on Galapagos4.

== Track listing ==
1. "Intro" - 1:19
2. "Reinventing the Wheel" - 4:49
3. "Any Day" - 3:53
4. "Qweloquiallisms" - 2:27
5. "It Won't Stop" - 3:18
6. "Snake Oil" - 2:18
7. "Natural Causes" - 1:56
8. "Take a Number" - 3:43
9. "The Manhattan Project" - 3:26
10. "Too Happy for Qwel" - 1:27
11. "Live Forever" - 4:08
12. "Cliché" - 3:18
13. "What You Thought Hops" - 4:55
14. "Thin Red Line" - 4:34
