= Civil Service (album) =

Album by Typical Cats

Studio album by Typical Cats
- Released: October 26, 2004
- Recorded: 2003–2004
- Genre: Underground hip-hop
- Length: 52:06
- Label: Galapagos4
- Producers: DJ Natural, Kid Knish

Typical Cats chronology
Typical Cats (2001)	Civil Service (2004)	3 (2012)

Professional ratings
Review scores
Source	Rating
Dream Logic	(Positive) link
Hip Hop Site	link
Platform8470	(75%) link
Xlr8r	(Positive) link

Civil Service is the second studio album by American underground hip-hop group Typical Cats. It was released on October 26, 2004, on Galapagos4. The lead single, "Easy Cause It Is", was released on September 2, 2004.

== Track listing ==
1. "Can't Save" - 5:05
2. "Easy Cause It Is" - 4:12
3. "Typical Flows" - 4:33
4. "No Man Island" - 4:05
5. "Justice Coming" - 3:47
6. "12th Story" - 0:51
7. "The Trouble" - 4:39
8. "Drink Ticket" - 4:49
9. "Butterfly Knives" - 3:50
10. "The Do" - 3:13
11. "The Pavement" - 4:24
12. "Style Wars Theory" - 4:25
13. "Before Before" - 4:09
