= Solillaquists of Sound =

American hip-hop group

- Also known as: Solilla
- Origin: Orlando, Florida, United States
- Genres: Alternative hip-hop
- Years active: 2002–present
- Labels: Nonsense, ANTI-/Epitaph
- Members: Alexandrah Sarton; Asaan Brooks (Swamburger); Tonya Combs; Glen Valencia Jr. (DiViNCi)
- Website: www.solilla.com

Solillaquists of Sound, often shortened to Solilla, is an American hip-hop quartet based in Orlando, Florida. Its line up currently consists of MCs Alexandrah and Swamburger, poet Tonya Combs and producer/composer Divinci. Solillaquists utilize elements of melody and harmony in their vocals. The two lead vocalists also frequently employ a style of delivering many punctuated syllables in rapid succession sometimes in tight synchronicity. Most of their song lyrics feature socially conscious content based on life-affirming, justice oriented views held by the group. They have attracted a dedicated following in underground hip-hop for their sophisticated musical compositions as well as their unique vocal delivery and politically aware lyrics.

== History ==
The group formed in August 2002 in Orlando, Florida. Swamburger and Divinci met through a mutual friend and began recording tracks together. Swamburger had known and collaborated musically with Alexandrah in Chicago and often spoke of a desire to collaborate with her again. At the same time a group of poets and performers were beginning to congeal into a close-knit circle of friends at a local performance venue called Bodhisattva Social Club. This group of people included the poet Tonya Combs who subsequently became romantically involved with Divinci who was already calling himself the Solillaquist of Sound.

The group of friends raised funds to visit Alexandrah in Chicago and they all spent time performing for and with each other becoming very energized by the results. Within a week of the group returning to Orlando, Alexandrah left her jobs, tied up all of her loose ends in Chicago and drove to Orlando to continue the collaboration. The foursome quickly recorded a full album, 4 Student Counsol, and released it through Nonsense Records, a local Orlando based label before ever having performed in front of a live audience as a group.

Divinci, who serves as the group's producer/composer, created hip-hop beats in the studio with an MPC player for the other group members to layer vocals over. In attempting to figure out how to translate that into a live performance the group went the route of obtaining more MPC players leading to an unusual live performance where Divinci employs three and sometimes four MPC devices weaving together a mixture of improvised electronic instrumentation and prerecorded sound samples in a very animated and impassioned fashion.

The group received a phone call from fellow intellectual rapper Sage Francis who had been given a demo CD by Divinci. They performed at a fundraiser with him and were invited on tour, where they served as his opening act and back-up band. The group was then signed to ANTI-/Epitaph. In June 2012, the group independently released The 4th Wall (Part 1) on their website.

== Collaborations ==
The first single from their CD No More Heroes was a tribute to hip-hop producer J Dilla called Death of the Muse. It featured J-Live, Chali 2na of Jurassic 5, and J Dilla's mother, Maureen "Ma Dukes" Yancey. The track was made available for download in late 2008, with all proceeds going to J Dilla's mother. News of the tribute track ended up being one of the most viewed stories of 2008 on the prominent hip-hop community okayplayer and was called "the most awesome song in the history of awesomedom" by LA Weekly.

Solillaquists of Sound enlisted the aid of fellow Orlando-based artist and frequent collaborator X:144 to create videos for the songs "Marvel" and "Gotham City Chase Scene" with low budgets but high production values

== Image ==
Solillaquists of Sound repeatedly utilize a comic book aesthetic in their album art, website and music videos. Through artistic depictions, cinematic music videos and energetic live performances the quartet exhibit and accentuate their diverse physical characteristics. For example, Alexandrah is unusual among female performers due to her complete baldness.

== Members ==
- Alexandrah Sarton - vocals
- Swamburger - vocals
- Tonya Combs - vocals
- DiViNCi - producer

== Discography ==
=== Studio albums ===
- 4 Student Counsol: Running from Precedence (2002)
- As If We Existed (2006)
- No More Heroes (2008)
- The 4th Wall: Part 1 (2012)
- The 4th Wall: Part 2 (2013)

=== Compilation albums ===
- N B Tween Worlds (2005)
- Tour de Solilla (2005)
- Tour de Solilla: Pt. Deux (2011)

=== Live albums ===
- Sol.illaquists Live (2003)

=== Singles ===
- "Fate-La" (2013)

=== Guest appearances ===
- The Gigantics - "Ball & Chain of Squares" from Die Already (2008)
- Sole - "So the Rich Can Sleep Tonight" from Nuclear Winter Volume 1 (2010)
- Dark Time Sunshine - "Instructions to Numb" from Vessel (2010)
- Grayskul - "I Adapt" from Zenith (2013)
- Subconscious Culture - "What Separates Us" from What Separates Us (2021)
