= Onry Ozzborn =

American rapper

- Onry Ozzborn performing live in 2010

Background information
- Also known as: Onry Of The Oraclez; Reason; Count Draven; Cape Cowen; Nigel; Rattlesnake Martinez; The Gigantics
- Born: Michael Sean Martinez; March 25, 1979 (age 47); Farmington, New Mexico
- Origin: Seattle, Washington
- Genres: Hip-hop; alternative hip-hop
- Occupations: Rapper, Producer
- Years active: 1997–present
- Labels: Rhymesayers Entertainment; Fake Four Inc

Michael Sean Martinez (born March 25, 1979), better known by his stage name Onry Ozzborn, is an American rapper and producer from Seattle, Washington. He is a founding member of alternative hip-hop groups such as Grayskul, Dark Time Sunshine, and Oldominion, among others.

Onry Ozzborn has collaborated with notable artists such as Aesop Rock, Sleep, Mr. Lif, P.O.S, Slug, and Busdriver.

== Life and career ==
=== 1997-2003: Formation of Oldominon, Oraclez Creed, Polarity and The Grey Area ===
Michael Martinez was born and raised in a small town in Farmington, New Mexico. Here, he grew up playing baseball and creating hip-hop music. In the small town's elementary school, he came to know another hip-hop artist named Sleep, who alongside Pale Soul, created his first hip-hop group, Oraclez Creed. Following Martinez's graduation, the group was put on hold as the members disbanded, with Martinez attending college in Arizona for his scholarship earned as a baseball player. Following a year, Sleep invited Martinez to visit Seattle, Washington. This visit led Martinez to drop out of school and focus solely on his musical career. Oraclez Creed soon came back together and through making connections in the Pacific Northwest hip-hop scene, they met another trio of rappers named Frontline, which consisted of Destro, Nyqwil, and Snafu. Soon enough, the six founded the prominent collective known as Oldominion.

In 2002, Onry Ozzborn formed the duo Norman, consisting of Oldominion emcee Barfly and Onry himself. Together, they released the critically acclaimed rap opera album Polarity. Pitchfork gave it a very favorable 8.3 out of 10, saying: "The duo's cadences play leapfrog with the beats, and they often rap at halftime for a surreal effect. The depressive, layered production reflects the isolating, wet darkness that grips the Pacific Northwest nine months out of the year. It's the unmistakable sound of Seattle hip-hop."

Following various solo albums being released independently, Onry Ozzborn released his 2003 breakthrough solo album The Grey Area. It features guest appearances from Qwel, Luckyiam and Sleep, among others. The album was given very positive reviews, with XLR8R saying: "Onry Ozzborn gives us an album of wonderfully intricate storytelling and mostly tight production. Call it goth hop, call it abstract, call it what you want-we call it dope." The album also featured Onry's first collaborations with producer Mr. Hill, another Oldominion member who would help shape a new sound for Seattle and Grayskul alike.

=== 2004-2007: Grayskul and Rhymesayers era ===
Through other Oldominion members and the local Seattle scene, Onry met another emcee named JFK Ninjaface. JFK Ninjaface was new to the circuit, as he had just moved from Virginia Beach, Virginia to live with his aunt after several run-ins with the law. At the time, JFK Ninjaface was only freestyling before meeting Onry Ozzborn, who had encouraged JFK to write. Not much later, the two formed the hip-hop duo Grayskul. The duo's music went from being released independently to being in the hands of Siddiq, the CEO of indie hip-hop label Rhymesayers Entertainment. Siddiq signed them and released their 2005 album Deadlivers, with most production handled by Mr. Hill. The album featured appearances from Canibus, Mr. Lif and Aesop Rock, the latter becoming a frequent collaborator to Onry Ozzborn. In the same year, Onry Ozzbron released his solo album In Between.

=== 2008-2012: Fake Four Inc, No Hoax, Hold On For Dear Life and Dark Time Sunshine ===
Subsequently following the release of two Grayskul albums on Rhymesayers, Onry released No Hoax separately as EP's in preparation to the release of his solo album Hold On For Dear Life. The album reached #3 on KEXP charts and garnered favorable reviews as well. In 2009, he met the Chicago producer Zavala and formed the group Dark Time Sunshine. Later that year, he signed to Ceschi's indie label Fake Four Inc.

=== 2013: Zenith ===
In 2013, Grayskul released their long awaited follow up album Zenith.

=== 2016-present: Duo, C V P ii D, Nervous Hvnd, THE RvTTLESNvKE MvRTINEZ MIXTvPE ===
In 2016, Onry Ozzborn released Duo, a solo album which included guest features on every track from artists such as Kimya Dawson, Rob Sonic and P.O.S, among others. The album was released with a video consisting of short snippets of the album and played together as a short film.

In February 2017, Onry released C V P ii D (pronounced as Cupid) featuring Alison Baker.

In September 2018, Onry released Nervous Hvnd, a solo album which included guest features from DJ Comfortable Kathy/vioLit, Ethos, and Swamburger. Like previous albums, Nervous Hvnd released with a music video featuring short snippets from the album.

In October 2018, Onry released a surprise mixtape THE RvTTLESNvKE MvRTINEZ MIXTvPE which included guest features from Iame and Scotty Del.

== Style ==
Onry Ozzborn's lyrical style has been described as brooding, thoughtful, and unique. He is also known to use different names depending on the project he is working on.

== Discography ==
=== Solo ===
==== Studio albums ====
- Knightingale
  - Released: March 22, 1997
  - Label: Self-released
- Alone
  - Released: January 8, 2002
  - Label: BSI Records/One Drop Records
- The Grey Area
  - Released: June 17, 2003
  - Label: One Drop Records
- In Between
  - Released: November 8, 2005
  - Label: Camobear Records
- Hold On for Dear Life
  - Released: January 25, 2011
  - Label: Fake Four Inc.
- Duo
  - Released: March 29, 2016
  - Label: Fake Four Inc.
- C V P ii D
  - Released: February 28, 2017
  - Label: Ted Records
- Nervous Hvnd
  - Released: September 13, 2018
  - Label: Ted Records
- Tantrum (Nigel)
  - Released: November 22, 2019
  - Label: Michael Martinez

==== EP's ====
- Venom EP
  - Released: January 31, 2001
  - Label: BSI Records
- No Hoax (1-4)
  - Released: December 26, 2010
  - Label: Fake Four Inc.

==== Mixtapes ====
- "Black Phillip"
  - Released: July 17, 2017
  - Label: 300 Club Records
- THE RvTTLESNvKE MvRTINEZ MIXTvPE
  - Released: October 31, 2018

=== Collaborative ===
==== Aurora ====
- "S7V7N Days" (with Sleep)
  - Released: July 14, 2001
  - Label: Momentum Studios

==== Norman ====
- Polarity (with Barfly)
  - Released: March 4, 2003
  - Label: Under The Needle
