= 3 (Typical Cats album) =

Studio album by Typical Cats
- Released: September 25, 2012
- Recorded: 2011–2012
- Genre: Underground hip-hop
- Length: 46:02
- Label: Galapagos4
- Producers: DJ Natural, Kid Knish

Typical Cats chronology
Civil Service (2004)	3 (2012)

Professional ratings
Review scores
Source	Rating
Fifth Element Online	(Positive) link
Rap Reviews	(Positive) link

3 is the third studio album by underground hip-hop group Typical Cats. It was released on September 25, 2012, on Galapagos4.

== Track listing ==
1. "Intro (Cry No More)" - 0:25
2. "The Crown" - 3:25
3. "My Watch" - 2:56
4. "Changing Room" - 0:22
5. "Puzzling Thing" - 3:42
6. "Better Luck" - 2:21
7. "Drop It Like It's Hotline" - 2:13
8. "Denizen Walks Away" - 3:15
9. "The Bitter Cold" - 2:16
10. "It's the Bomb" - 0:16
11. "On My Square" - 4:50
12. "Blank Stone" - 2:53
13. "Scientists of Sound" - 0:15
14. "Mathematics" - 3:57
15. "Gil Say They Don't Knock" - 1:49
16. "Bowl of Tea" - 0:24
17. "Reflections from the Porch" - 2:29
18. "The Gordeon Knock" - 3:28
19. "TC Back for More" - 1:02
20. "Full Clip (For the Last Day)" - 3:36
