= Grayskul =

American hip-hop group

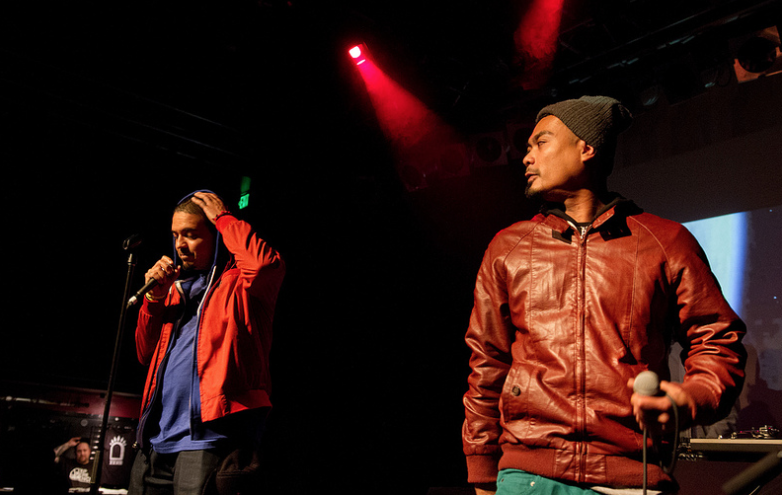
- Onry Ozzborn (left) and JFK Ninjaface (right)

Background information
- Origin: Seattle, Washington, U.S.
- Genres: Hip-hop; alternative hip-hop; northwest hip-hop
- Years active: 2003–present
- Labels: Rhymesayers Entertainment, Fake Four Inc.
- Members: JFK Ninjaface; Onry Ozzborn
- Past members: Rob Castro

Grayskul is an American hip-hop duo based in Seattle, Washington, consisting of rappers Onry Ozzborn and JFK Ninjaface. Since its formation in 2003, the group has released ten solo albums. The duo often collaborate with artists from the Pacific Northwest hip-hop collective Oldominion.

== History ==
In 2003, Onry Ozzborn and JFK, both members of the Pacific Northwest hip-hop collective Oldominion, teamed up with bassist Rob Castro to form Grayskul. They recorded about 55 songs in 8 months at ATB Studios; these would eventually become the albums Creature, Thee Adventures! and Deadlivers. After opening for Eyedea & Abilities, their music was brought to the attention of Rhymesayers Entertainment.

Grayskul's label debut, Deadlivers, was released in 2005. It featured guest appearances such as Canibus, Mr. Lif and Abstract Rude. The album also featured the song "Secret Wars", which featured the Oldominion emcees that had been in the group at the time.

In 2007, Grayskul released their second album on Rhymesayers Entertainment, Bloody Radio, this time with Onry Ozzborn going by the name Count Draven and JFK going by the name Count Magnus. While this album excluded Rob Castro, Cage, Slug and Aesop Rock provided guest verses.

In 2009, Grayskul in collaboration with producer Maker released Graymaker on Taxidermy Records. In an interview with Seattle Weekly, Onry Ozzborn said: "Of the albums we've done in the past, we've never had a whole project that's straight-ahead hip-hop ... People always say our stuff is dark, weird, bugged-out, but I think this one will catch people by surprise. [Maker's] beats in general made us write different. He uses more breakbeats, slower BPMs, so you'll be able to hear that."

In 2013, Grayskul released Zenith on Fake Four Inc.

== Style and influences ==
Members of Grayskul cited Cannibal Ox's The Cold Vein as an important influence.

== Discography ==
=== Albums ===
- Thee Adventures! (2004)
- Creature (2004)
- Deadlivers (2005)
- Wand and the Gun (2005)
- Name in Vain (2006)
- Blood Sweat and Fears (2006)
- Facefeeder (2007) (with Xperience)
- Bloody Radio (2007)
- Graymaker (2009) (with Maker)
- Zenith (2013)

=== Singles ===
- "Prom Quiz" (2005)
- "Scarecrow" (2007)
- "Mod Volatile" b/w "At the Time" (2009)

=== Guest appearances ===
- Boom Bap Project - "War of the Roses" from Reprogram (2005)
- Fakts One - "Set the Mood" from Long Range (2008)
- The Insects - "Fear" from Gone (2009)
- Sleep - "Hesitation Wounds" from Hesitation Wounds (2009)
- IAME - "Tight" from I Am My Enemy (2009)
- Sapient - "Cold How We Keep It" from Famine Friends (2009)
- The Kid Espi and The Wright Family - "Am Flag" from Here and Happy (2010)
- COOLETHAN - "No Crown" from "You Can Never Go Back" (2024)
