= Boom Bap Project =

American hip-hop group

- Origin: Portland, Oregon
- Genre: Hip-hop
- Years active: 2001-present
- Labels: Stuck Records, Rhymesayers Entertainment
- Members: Karim, DJ Tre', Destro
- Past members: DJ Scene

Boom Bap Project is an American Northwest hip-hop group from Portland, Oregon. It consists of DJ Scene from MADK and 206Zulu tribe, along with Karim and Destro, the latter of whom are also part of the Oldominion collective.

== History ==
Boom Bap Project released the first album, Circumstance Dictates, in 2001. After the release of the album, DJ Tre was replaced by DJ Scene.

In 2005, Boom Bap Project released the album Reprogram on Rhymesayers Entertainment. Most of the album was produced by Jake One and Vitamin D. It featured guest appearances from Gift of Gab and Rakaa, among others.

== Discography ==
=== Albums ===
- Circumstance Dictates EP (2001)
- Reprogram (2005)
- The Shakedown (tour only CD released Fall 2006)
- Return Flight EP (2021)

=== Singles ===
- "The Trade" b/w "Writers Guild" (2000)
- "The Trade Remix" (2002)
- "Get Up, Get Up!" (2003)
- "Rock the Spot" b/w "Wyle Out" (2005)

=== Guest appearances ===
- Chazz Rokk - "As Good As Gone" from Landed on Us (2003)
- Static & Nat Ill - "Checkout Time" (2006)
- Snowgoons - "The Storm" from Black Snow (2008)
