= Oldominion =

American hip hop group

- The Oldominion logo.

Background information
- Origin: Northwest, United States
- Genres: Hip hop, alternative hip hop, Pacific Northwest hip hop
- Years active: 1999–present
- Labels: Under the Needle
- Members: Anaxagorus; Azrael The Silent Angel; Barfly; Bishop I Candidt; Coley Cole; Destro; JFK Ninjaface; Hyena; IAME; Karim; L'Swhere; Mako; Mr. Hill; Nyqwil; Onry Ozzborn; Pale Soul; PeeGee 13 (Taco Neck); Sleep; Smoke M2D6; Snafu; Syndel; Toni Hill; Tremor; Xperience; Zebulon Dak
- Past members: Ruben Rochester A.P. (deceased); Jon Dinyaroo "Big Gash" Sanders (deceased); Wraggz the Warlord (deceased); Nickels Hawkeye

Oldominion is an American hip hop collective, consisting of more than twenty members. It was described by Casey Jarman of Willamette Week as the "Northwest's largest hip-hop crew" which "united the local underground rap scene for the first time".

== History ==
After Oraclez Creed (Onry Ozzborn, Pale Soul, and Sleep) connected with Frontline (Destro, Nyqwil, and Snafu), Rochester A.P. named the group Oldominion in 1999. The first album, One, was released in 2000.

== Discography ==
Albums

- One (2000)
- Make Happy (2008)

EPs

- Book of Fury (2000)
- Oldominion Volume 1 (2001)
- Oldominion Volume 2 (2001)
- Oldominion Volume 3 (2002)

Compilations

- Negative One and a Half (2004)

Singles

- "Don't Kill Your Radio" (1999)
- "Parallel to Hell / Serenade to Silence" (2000)
- "Ten" (2008)

== See also ==
- Pacific Northwest hip hop
- Underground hip hop
