= Northwestern hip-hop =

Hip hop music scene

Hip-hop in the Pacific Northwest
- Stylistic origins: Funk; R&B
- Cultural origins: Late 1980s, Pacific Northwest United States

Subgenres
- Alaskan hip-hop

Regional scenes
- Seattle; Portland; Anchorage; Fairbanks; Juneau

Northwest hip-hop is hip-hop that originates from the Pacific Northwest of North America, encompassing major cities such as Portland, Seattle, and other towns. Northwest hip-hop music mixes elements from various genres of music to form a sound different from its southern neighbor, West Coast hip-hop. For many years the scene existed mainly as an underground genre, but Northwest hip-hop has seen increased mainstream acceptance in the 21st century, with artists such as Lil Mosey gaining nationwide attention. Additionally, Alaska has its own regional variation of hip-hop, with scenes existing in Anchorage and Fairbanks, and to a lesser extent Juneau.

== Overview ==
During the late 1970s, high school kids from the Rainier Beach, Rainier Valley, and Central District areas started to perfect early hip-hop forms of dancing in the northwest defined as bopping. Many of the local underage clubs and high schools in South Seattle held formal contests called bop-offs where dancers would compete against one another. There were also informal bop offs that occurred at house parties and school yards where urban kids "called out" one another to compete. Some of the more prominent dancers (or boppers) during this period were James "PJ" Daniels, John "Sir John III" Arnold, James "Captain Crunch" Croone, Pojo, Snake, among others in the south Seattle area. Bopping, also known as poppin', was seen as the precursor for many popular forms of urban style dancing today. These bop-offs were a segue to some of the first rap competitions in the northwest. A student group from Rainier Beach High School called LTD (Leaders of Tomorrow's Democracy) with its DJ, John "Sir John III" Arnold, put on all-city rap competitions offering prize money. These events attracted the top rappers across the city which included the Emerald Street Boys among others in the early 80s.

In the early 1980s, soldiers stationed at Tacoma's military bases provided the foundation for a growing hip-hop fan base in the Northwest. In the 1980s, Seattle rapper Sir Mix-A-Lot started his career. Fresh Tracks was a two-hour show that played on Sunday nights on KKFX 1250 ("KFOX" and formerly KKDZ), and consisted of a mix of new songs and a mastermix created by Nasty Nes. These mixes were made up of songs by The World's Famous Supreme Team, Malcolm McLaren, Run-D.M.C. and many others. Due to the show's popularity, the station's producer allowed Nes to expand it to a Monday through Friday, 9pm to midnight show called NightBeat that featured prominent R&B songs as well as intermixed rap songs. As Seattle's music scene evolved, so did the Seattle breakdance and graffiti crews, including B-Boy groups like Silver Chain Gang, Circuit Breakers, and Breaking Mechanism, and graffiti writers such as Spaide, Streak, DadOne, and Spraycan. With this space there was room for an eclectic group of identities to form, however none were successful in formulating a Seattle identity. Old school rapper Kid Sensation was also from Seattle.

== History ==
=== 1980–1986 ===
1982 marked the year "The King Crewsade" radio show started on KBOO based in Portland Oregon. Host Chris Blanchard, aka "King Vitamin" hosted this call in rap show with rudimentary scratch mixes featuring Sugarhill Records and songs like Planet Rock.

=== 1986–1992 ===
In 1986, the first radio show in Spokane to play rap and hip-hop on commercial radio was The Power Switch on POWER 104 FM (KXVO). Hosted by TJ Collins, Collins also featured local rappers and began airing mixes by GrandMixer GMS (who was a young teenager at the time).

Nastymix Records, the Northwest's first hip-hop label was founded with the local release of Sir Mix-A-Lot's "Square Dance Rap". Def American released Sir Mix-A-Lot's 1992 No. 1 hit "Baby Got Back", which won a Grammy Award for Best Rap Solo Performance. This award came after Nastymix's last release, Criminal Nation's 1992 album Trouble in the Hood.

=== 1993–2002 ===
Seattle hip-hop culture was confined to the only venues that would play hip-hop, all of which were in Seattle's traditionally African-American neighborhood, the Central District (referred to in Seattle as "The CD".) In 1993, Jonathan "Wordsayer" Moore of Source of Labor approached Caroline Davenport of Tasty Shows, who was responsible for booking a popular Seattle venue called RCKCNDY. In 1996 a venue called the Power Plant, 825 Western Ave, Seattle (now a Dania Furniture store 2015)became a popular venue on Saturday nights with a hip-hop group called The High Children. Home for B-Boys, break-dance battles and hosted the legendary Invisible Scratch Pickles versus X-men.

Funk Daddy, Gangsta Nut, Dee Lyrious, Crooked Path, Mob Related, Self-Titld were from Seattle and Bosko, Cool Nutz, Maniak Loc & CN, Hakim & J-Mack were from Portland, Oregon. The alternative/grunge music scene soon dominated the Northwest's musical image, and in both Seattle and Portland this contributed to the troubled adolescence of local hip-hop. The Teen Dance Ordinance, which had been in effect since 1985, made it almost impossible for most Seattle venues to book all-ages shows. The social turmoil of Seattle during the late 1990s (The World Trade Organization Protest), the city's outspoken political opposition to President George W. Bush, and the despised Teen Dance Ordinance characterized the socially conscious style that defined Northwest hip-hop after 1993, a style that was continually strengthened as the hip-hop culture was attacked and labeled as violent and disruptive. However, production companies grew in NW like Winetime productions producing in the 1990s for national artists like The Click, Celly Cel and E-40. Winetime then took Midwest/local artist Tony-O and climbed the Billboard charts in 1998 and 1999 peaking at No. 14 in Rap Singles with a song called "PHD (Playa Hater Degree)". Rap artist Tony-O is the only NW artist other than Sir Mix-A-Lot until Macklemore to top the billboard charts in hip-hop at that time.

=== 2002–present ===
Macklemore is a hip-hop artist from the Pacific Northwest who received much national and international attention. At the 56th Annual Grammy Awards, Macklemore received seven Grammy award nominations, and won four of those, including the awards for Best New Artist, Best Rap Album (The Heist), Best Rap Song and Best Rap Performance ("Thrift Shop"). However, Macklemore's success has been met with frustration from many local PNW hip-hop artists who feel that Macklemore's status as a white, middle class male has led him to his popular position and feel disheartened that the underground artists are not better able to represent their city and region.

Macklemore & Ryan Lewis went on to self-produce their first full-length album The Heist, released in October 2012, and earned a 2014 Grammy for Best Rap Song for their national hit, "Thrift Shop", and MTV Video Music Awards for Best Hip Hop Video, Best Video with a Social Message, and Best Cinematography for "Can't Hold Us", "Same Love", and "Can't Hold Us", respectively.

In 2019, DJ Nasty Nes revived his classic radio show, KFOX Nightbeat, featuring songs he originally played on Fresh Tracks and Nightbeat, as well as exclusive new music (like he did on Fresh Tracks), and mastermixes by Spokane's GrandMixer GMS. The Beacon strives to create a safe place for the hip-hop community.

By the late 2000s, Anchorage's rap scene began to decline as federal attention began to shift towards numerous arrests in connection to crimes ranging from drug trafficking and murders. A new wave soon emerged in the late 2010s with numerous artists exhibiting influences from across the United States as Alaska's population continued to grow with incentives for employment and residence. The resurgence in growth was not solely limited to Anchorage as Juneau also saw a rise in its own rap scene. Rappers of Tlingit descent have mixed phrases and elements of their ethnic music and language into their own expression of hip hop.

Notable Northwest rappers of the 2020s include Yeat of Portland, as well as Lil Mosey and charlieonnafriday of Seattle.

== The Legacy of Seattle Hip-Hop at MOHAI ==
Seattle's Museum of History and Industry (MOHAI) curated and showcased an exhibit called The Legacy of Seattle Hip Hop from September 19, 2015, through May 1, 2016. This exhibit was curated by Jazmyn Scott of The Town Entertainment and Aaron Walker-Loud of Big World Breaks.

Items on display included Macklemore's fur jacket and scooter from his and Ryan Lewis' iconic "Thrift Shop" music video as well as Nasty Nes' NASTYMIX bomber jacket. There were several different sections of the exhibit focusing on different elements of hip-hop culture. One section was devoted to music production. It featured two mixing stations that played tracks by Vitamin D and Jake One, as well as letting visitors interact with the tracks by using the mixing boards.

Another section was dedicated to breakdancing, highlighting some of the early b-boys and b-girls in the Seattle scene as well as well-known groups like the Massive Monkees. In the middle of the floor was a raised dancing platform (Seattle Met article) and on the walls were items like a Boom Squad jersey from the group that used to perform during halftime at Seattle SuperSonics games.

== See also ==
- G-funk
- Gangsta rap
- Funk
- Miami bass
- Portland Hip Hop Week
