= Robin Garbose =

American filmmaker and theatre director

Robin Saex Garbose
- Born: Robin Saex; Holyoke, Massachusetts
- Education: Williston Northampton School; Brown University
- Occupations: Director, writer, producer
- Years active: 1983-present
- Organization: Kol Neshama Performing Arts Conservatory
- Spouse: Levi Yitzhaq Garbose (m. 1999)
- Website: kolneshama.org

Robin Saex Garbose is an American filmmaker and theatre director. Following an early career directing several off-Broadway plays and episodes of the shows Head of the Class and America's Most Wanted, Garbose embraced Orthodox Judaism and founded the Kol Neshama Performing Arts Conservatory, a summer camp and arts conservatory providing an artistic outlet for teenage Orthodox girls. With Kol Neshama, she has produced several projects, including the films A Light at Greytowers (2007), The Heart That Sings (2011), and Operation: Candlelight (2014). Her projects have been screened at the Museum of Tolerance, the Menachem Begin Heritage Center, the Jerusalem and Tel Aviv Cinematheques, and the Atlanta Jewish Film Festival.

== Early life ==
Garbose grew up in Holyoke, Massachusetts, in a Conservative Jewish family; her parents belonged to a local synagogue and were active in philanthropy. She later described being surrounded by "Yankee culture" growing up and said that her parents "were very Zionist and involved with the community. But religion was never about God, it was about Jewish culture, tradition and Israel." She had her first acting experience at age 6 and convinced her teachers to let her direct a Hanukkah play for her school. As a teenager, she was affected by reading numerous books on the Holocaust, later saying “I was very frightened by death. I saw it as this big black abyss beyond! I was on a certain quest to find meaning. And as I got older, I became more conscious of this quest.”

After graduating from Williston Northampton School in 1978, Garbose majored in theater at Brown University as an undergraduate student and obtained a degree in theater.

== Career ==
While at Brown University and living in New York, Garbose worked with filmmaker Todd Haynes and directed a number of off-Broadway productions for groups including Ensemble Studio Theatre, Jewish Repertory Theater, Manhattan Punch Line, and Juilliard Theatre Center (where she also taught), in addition to assisting directors at the Circle Repertory Company and Manhattan Theatre Club. She directed a 1982 production of William Shakespeare's Twelfth Night with Production Workshop, Mark Malone's 1984 one-act play A Sense of Loss starring Timothy Carhart and Matthew Penn for an Ensemble Studio Theatre marathon led by David Mamet's Vermont Sketches, and a 1985 production of Brian Friel's Winners starring her Brown classmates John F. Kennedy Jr. and his girlfriend Christina Haag at Manhattan's Irish Arts Center. Kara Kennedy, William Kennedy Smith, Robert F. Kennedy Jr., and Anthony Radziwiłł attended the premiere, as did representatives of ICM Partners talent agency.

Also in 1985, Garbose directed a short-form version of Howard Korder's "Boy's Life" called Life On Earth with Jack Stehlin and Lisa Barnes for Manhattan Punch Line, Bob Morris's The Grandpa Chronicle starring Korder and Bernie Passeltiner for Theater for the New City, and Korder's Lip Service for Manhattan Punch Line starring Peter Riegert and John Hallow. In 1988, she directed Mark O'Donnell's Requiem for a Heavyweight and Howard Morris's Almost Romance starring Fisher Stevens and Helen Slater. In 1989, she directed T. L. Wagener's Marathons starring Ellen Tobie and Michael French, and in 1990, she directed John Burrows's musical comedy about pregnancy It's A Girl, starring Olivia d'Abo, for Odyssey Theatre in West Los Angeles, and Cynthia Heimel's A Girl's Guide to Chaos starring Ricki Lake, Debra Jo Rupp, Deborah Adair, Kimberly Scott, and Scott Jaeck at Tiffany Theater in West Hollywood.

In 2000, Garbose and playwright Pauline LePor, who had met at Juilliard, founded Bais Miriam, a summer arts conservatory for teenage Orthodox Jewish girls supported by Juilliard and Bais Chana High School. The conservatory's culminating project, a series of five one-act pieces entitled Wonder of Wonders, was staged at Crossroads School Theater in Santa Monica in August 2000.

In 2004, she directed for Bais Chana High School a musical historical drama called Portraits of Faith, written by her husband Levi Yitzhaq Garbose based on a Marcus Lehmann novel and with songs based on Hasidic nigunim; the play was staged in March at Scottish Rite Theater in Los Angeles.

From 2014 to 2017, Garbose ran a summer program at Machon Alte Seminary in Safed, Israel between July 13 and August 18.

=== Film and TV ===
Garbose's first job in film was as an assistant to director Barnet Kellman on the 1985 romantic comedy film Key Exchange. She directed for the sitcom Head of the Class during its final season in 1991, but ended up leaving sitcoms because, due to her growing Orthodox observance, she was no longer comfortable with some of the messages in the show nor having to work on Shabbat. While skiing at Sundance Film Festival, she met a producer for America's Most Wanted and subsequently directed multiple reenactment segments for the show until leaving in 2001.

Shortly after leaving Head of the Class in 1991, Garbose began developing a screenplay entitled The Spark, about the granddaughter of a Holocaust survivor from the Warsaw Ghetto reconnecting to her heritage, and interviewed several survivors through the Simon Wiesenthal Center for research, contributing to her own religious journey. The screenplay was later selected for development at the Sundance Institute Screenwriter's Lab in Utah, and as recently as 2016 the script was reportedly in production with Garbose set to direct and Abigail Breslin attached to star.

As of 2017, Garbose and her husband and writing partner, Levi Yitzhaq Garbose, were in pre-production on a dramedy called Meet The Shustermans, intended as her first general audience project.

=== Kol Neshama ===
In 2000, Garbose founded Kol Neshama, a summer camp and performing arts conservatory for Orthodox teenage girls based in Los Angeles, with the first session being held in the summer of 2001. The program combines mornings devoted to davening and Torah study with afternoons and evenings devoted to artistic education in acting, music, and dance, among other disciplines, with rehearsals for an end-of-session production. Leah Gottfried, who later created the web series Soon By You, attended the program as a teenager and was mentored by Garbose, working on several of her films.

Plays produced by the program have included a 2001 four-act showcase entitled Heaven Sent: An Evening of Miracle Plays, staged at the Ivar Theater in Hollywood, and an August 2003 double feature of Hear O Israel and Little Lord Titchwood, also staged at the Ivar Theater. They also produced a direct-to-DVD series called Camp Bnos Yisrael, the first episode of which premiered on November 6, 2006, at a benefit function at the Museum of Tolerance.

Garbose and Kol Neshama produced their first theatrical feature film in 2007 with A Light For Greytowers, a musical historical drama about a young Jewish girl escaping from Czarist Russia and ending up at the harsh Greytowers orphanage in Victorian England, based on a young adult novel of the same name by Eva Vogel and Ruth Steinberg. The film was shot in 2004 at the Rohr Jewish Student Center at the University of Southern California and starred girls from the Kol Neshama program (including a young Abby Shapiro, sister of political commentator Ben Shapiro and later known as the YouTuber Classically Abby). Shown only to all-female audiences in accordance with kol isha, the film premiered at the Sherry Lansing Theater on the Paramount Pictures studio lot in January 2007 (with further showings there in December 2007 and January 2008) and saw screenings at Stern College for an event led by Miriam Leah Gamliel's ATARA organization; at the Jewish Children's Museum in Crown Heights, Brooklyn; at Menorah Hall in Borough Park; in Manchester, England during Hanukkah of 2008; at the Menachem Begin Heritage Center in Jerusalem; and at the 2009 Atlanta Jewish Film Festival. The film was planned for screening at the Jerusalem Cinematheque for the Jerusalem Jewish Film Festival, but was pulled due to conflict over Garbose's insistence on female-only screenings and was screened at the Menachem Begin Heritage Center and the Tel Aviv Cinematheque instead. It also saw controversy during its Borough Park screening; Orthodox audiences expressed concern over the presence of male actors in the film and the film was threatened with being shut down, though this ultimately did not happen.

A second film, The Heart That Sings, was produced in 2011. Based on short story by Gershon Kranzler, the film is a musical historical drama about a young Holocaust survivor serving as drama director at a Catskills camp in 1950s. Produced on a budget of US$350,000, the film premiered in March 2011 in Los Angeles at the Museum of Tolerance and the day after at Jewish Children's Museum in Crown Heights, and was later screened in Israel in December at Jerusalem Cinematheque, Tel Aviv Cinematheque, and Heichal Shlomo and at the Atlanta Jewish Film Festival in February 2012.

Garbose and Kol Neshama released a third film in 2014, an action-adventure film called Operation: Candlelight, partially funded through Kickstarter. Filmed over the summer of 2013 in Calabasas, California, the film's premiered was held December 15 and 16, 2014 at the Museum of Tolerance.

== Personal life ==
She moved to Los Angeles in 1988, where she now lives with her husband Levi Yitzhaq Garbose, a musician and fellow baal teshuva, and their children, Menachem Mendel and Chaya Solika, the latter of whom has acted in several of her mother's projects.

=== Spirituality and beliefs ===
Garbose is a baalat teshuva, having come to Hasidic and Orthodox Judaism in 1991 after attending a Breslov-run kabbalah class; she has said her "frumkeit was deepened" while directing episodes of America's Most Wanted. She had previously experimented with the teachings of Ram Dass and past life regression during the 1980s. She also had a meeting with the kabbalist Rabbi Yitzhak Kaduri when he visited Los Angeles, during which he gave her a blessing for success with her screenplay The Spark. She has drawn inspiration from Chabad and the Lubavitcher Rebbe and directed a play, Roots: The Journey Home, based on the memoirs of Yosef Yitzchak Schneersohn, the Sixth Chabad Rebbe.

Garbose is an anti-cult activist, having covered the countercult movement during her time on America's Most Wanted and worked with psychologist and cult specialist Steven Hassan. In 2014, Garbose gave testimony at a rabbinic hearing regarding the alleged cult status of the organization Call of the Shofar, appearing before Rabbis Dovid Cohen and Abraham J. Twerski and on behalf of prosecutor Rabbi Shea Hecht. She later contributed an account of the meeting to the Chabad news website CrownHeights.info.

== Credits ==
=== Film and TV ===
Year	Title	Director	Producer	Writer	Notes
1985	Key Exchange	No	No	No	Assistant to director Barnet Kellman
1991	Head of the Class	Yes	No	No	Episodes including "The Phantom of the Glee Club" (as Robin Sack)
1993-2001	America's Most Wanted	Yes	No	No	Various episodes
2006-2012	Camp Bnos Yisrael	Yes	Yes	Yes	Direct-to-video series
2007	A Light for Greytowers	Yes	Yes	Yes	
2011	The Heart That Sings	Yes	Yes	Yes	
2014	Operation: Candlelight	Yes	Yes	Yes	
2016	Soon By You	No	No	No	Special thanks on episodes "The Setup" and "The Follow-Up"
TBA	The Spark	Yes	Yes	Yes	
TBA	Meet The Shustermans	Yes	Yes	Yes	

=== Theatre ===
==== As director ====
- Twelfth Night (1982) (Production Workshop)
- The End of Humanity...As We Know It (1983)
- A Sense of Loss (1984) (Mark Malone, Ensemble Studio Theatre)
- Life On Earth (1985) (Howard Korder, Manhattan Punch Line)
- The Grandpa Chronicle (1985) (Bob Morris, Theater for the New City)
- Winners (1985) (Brian Friel, Irish Arts Center)
- Lip Service (1985) (Howard Korder, Manhattan Punch Line)
- Waving Goodbye (1987)
- Women and Football (1988)
- Almost Romance (1988) (Howard Morris)
- Requiem for a Heavyweight (1989) (Mark O'Donnell)
- The Sea Gull (1988) (Anton Chekhov)
- Marathons (1989) (T. L. Wagener)
- The Cherry Orchard (1989) (Anton Chekhov)
- It's a Girl (1990) (John Burrows, Odyssey Theatre)
- A Girl's Guide to Chaos (1990) (Cynthia Heimel, Tiffany Theater)
- Portraits of Faith (2004) (Levi Yitzhaq Garbose, Scottish Rite Theater)
- Roots: The Journey Home (2008) (Ohel Chana High School)

==== Other ====
- Hackers: A Play in Eleven Scenes (1986; credited as "Comedy Corps Manager" for Manhattan Punch Line)
