= Bleich =

Bleich is a surname. Notable people with the surname include:

- Anet Bleich (born 1951), Dutch journalist
- E. Joseph Bleich (born 1950), Louisiana Supreme Court justice
- Jeff Bleich (born 1961), US Ambassador to Australia from 2009 till 2013
- Jeremy Bleich (born 1987), American-Israeli professional baseball relief pitcher
- J. David Bleich (born 1936), American rabbi and authority on Jewish law and ethics
- Judith Bleich (born 1938), professor of Judaic studies at Touro College in Manhattan
- Sara Naomi Bleich, American psychologist and professor
- Yaakov Bleich (born 1964), US-Ukrainian rabbi

== See also ==
- Bloch
- Blech
- Blick
- Blieck
