= Wagener (surname) =

Wagener is a German surname. Notable people with the surname include:

- Ana Wagener (born 1962), Spanish actress
- Carl Wagener (1901–1988), German officer
- Catherine Wagener (1951–2011), French actress
- David Douglas Wagener (1792–1860), American politician
- Dirk Wagener (born 1971), German diplomat and international development official
- Frank Wagener (born 1952), chairman of the Luxembourg Stock Exchange
- George Wagener, New York politician
- Gorden Wagener (born 1968), German car designer
- Hans Wagener (1931–2021), Dutch field hockey player
- Hermann Wagener (1815–1889), Prussian jurist
- Henry Wagener (1891–1979), American farmer and politician
- Hilde Wagener (1904–1992), German-born actress
- Jack Wagener (1905–1986), English cricketer
- Joachim Heinrich Wilhelm Wagener (1782–1861), German banker and patron of the arts
- Johann Andreas Wagener, American politician
- Maximilian Wagener (born 1995), German football player
- Michael Wagener (born 1951), German record producer
- Niklas Wagener (born 1998), German politician
- Nora Wagener (born 1989), Luxembourgish writer
- Otto Wagener (1888–1971), German general
- Renée Wagener (born 1962), Luxembourgish politician and journalist
- Richard Wagener (born 1944), American wood engraver
- Robin Wagener (born 1980), German judge and politician
- Sigbert Wagener (1919–2004), German Capuchin priest and entomologist
- Terri Wagener, American playwright and screenwriter
- Werner Wagener (1894–?), German flying ace
