= Nehorai =

- Pronunciation: [ne(h)oˈʁaj]
- Gender: Male
- Language: Hebrew

Origin
- Language: Aramaic
- Meaning: Light

Other names
- Variant forms: Nehoray, Neorai, Neoray

Nehorai (also transliterated as Nehoray, Neoray, Neorai) is a male Hebrew name נְהוֹרַאי, from Aramaic נְהוֹר nehor or נְהוֹרָא nehora meaning "light". The name appears three times in the Mishnah. He who was called Nehorai because he enlightened the eyes of his peers in knowledge of halakhah.

== People ==
- Arye Nehorai, Israeli American professor emeritus
- Elad Nehorai, American writer and activist
- Eleazar ben Arach, who may have received the nickname Nehorai
- Nehoray Dabush, Israeli footballer
- Nehorai Garmon (c. 1682–1760), Tunisian poet
- Nehorai Ifrach, Israeli footballer
- Rabbi Meir, whose previous name was Nehorai
- Shalom Nehorai HaLevi, Yemenite Rabbi from Beit 'Adaqah who founded Tzuriel
- Yair Nehorai, Israeli lawyer and author

== See also ==
- Noor (name), means "light" in Arabic
