= Hevria =

American Jewish arts and culture website

- Official Hevria logo
- Website type: Essays, blogging, Judaism, arts education
- Founded: March 2014
- Founders: Elad Nehorai; Matthue Roth
- Editor: Matthue Roth
- Website: hevria.com

Hevria is an American Jewish arts and culture website and collective.

== History ==
Hevria was founded as a group blog in April 2014 by writers Elad Nehorai and Matthue Roth. The site's name is a portmanteau of the Hebrew words "chevra" (group or society) and "briah" (creation). Roth and Nehorai conceived of the project during an email conversation in 2012 with writer Chaya Kurtz, who had gotten attention for an xoJane article entitled "What Women's Media Needs to Know About Chassidic Women "; the three theorized that a full website could give even more insight into Hasidic Jews, and Nehorai subsequently recruited other blogging contacts to participate.

Beginning as a collaborative group blog for personal essays, poetry, and fiction writing, the website evolved into a creative collective hosting communal gatherings, arts workshops, weekend retreats, "creative farbrengens", and other events. Other Hevria projects have included "Hevria Sessions", a series of live studio performances by up-and-coming Jewish musicians such as Levi Robin and Bulletproof Stockings, and Neshamas, a sister site that publishes anonymous stories involving heavier topics such as abuse and mental illness in the religious Jewish community.

On January 2, 2020, Nehorai announced that he would be stepping down as editor of Hevria, citing concerns that the attention he was receiving as an activist was distracting from the site's mission. He clarified that Roth would be taking over the site's leadership and that he would remain involved in a less visible capacity. In January 2022, Nehorai posted an article to his newsletter giving more details about his decision to leave Hevria, in particular citing the backlash to an article he had written defending LGBT rights in the Orthodox community as a culminating moment.

== Projects ==
In 2016, Nehorai and filmmaker Matthew Bowman began producing through Hevria a five-episode documentary web series on the Israeli community of Bat Ayin, located in the Gush Etzion area.

=== HevriaCast ===
From 2017 to 2019, Nehorai hosted HevriaCast, the website's official podcast, wherein he interviewed artists, writers, and other creatives in the Jewish world. The podcast was recorded at CLAL Studios in New York City, and the standard intro and outro music was the song "Voice Lessons" by Darshan. Many Hevria contributors were guests on the show, as were Hasidic artist Yitzchok Moully, comedian Mendy Pellin, actress and filmmaker Amy Guterson, social media personality Adina Sash, and musicians Dalia Shusterman, Isaiah Rothstein, Bram Presser, Jon Madof, Basya Schechter, and Eprhyme, among others.
