= Elad Nehorai =

American writer and activist (born 1984)

- Born: Elad Nehorai; September 23, 1984 (age 42); Stanford, California, U.S.
- Education: Arizona State University
- Occupations: Writer, blogger, social media personality, activist
- Years active: 2010-present
- Known for: Pop Chassid, Hevria
- Spouse: Rivka Nehorai
- Website: eladnehorai.com

Elad Nehorai (born September 23, 1984) is an American writer, activist, and social and political commentator. A left-wing, formerly Orthodox Jew, his writing and activism typically revolves around social justice, mental health, religion, opposition to antisemitism, and advocacy for arts education, particularly within the Jewish community.

Nehorai came to prominence through his blog Pop Chassid, where he looked at pop culture through a Jewish lens. In 2014, he co-founded Hevria, a Jewish arts and culture website and in-person community, where he was an editor-in-chief and head event organizer until January 2020. Following the 2016 United States presidential election and the ascendancy of Donald Trump, Nehorai became involved with the organization Torah Trumps Hate, a Jewish-run social justice advocacy group.

He has written for The Guardian, HuffPost, The Forward (where he was a columnist), The Times of Israel, Haaretz, Chabad.org, The Daily Beast, and the Jewish Telegraphic Agency, and has appeared on HLN, i24 News, and BBC Radio. Nehorai was included in The Jewish Week's annual "36 Under 36" list in 2016, and in 2018 the Jewish Telegraphic Agency listed him among its "50 Jews Everyone Should Follow on Twitter".

== Early life ==
Nehorai grew up in Branford, Connecticut and Highland Park, Illinois. He is the child of Israeli parents and is three-quarters Sephardi Jewish and quarter Ashkenazi Jewish. His father, Arye Nehorai, is a professor emeritus of electrical engineering and his mother, Shlomit Nehorai, was a Hebrew lecturer and a marriage and family therapist. He has written about being subjected to racist teasing and "terrorist" jokes by classmates due to his Middle Eastern appearance.

Nehorai attended Arizona State University, where he was a member of ASU for Israel, a division of the campus Hillel branch focused on pro-Israel activism, and often spoke at the group's rallies. He also became involved with the school's Chabad house, led by Rabbi Shmuel Tiechtel, which contributed to him becoming a baal teshuva later in life. He later attended Mayanot Institute in Israel, graduating in 2012.

== Notable projects and activism ==
=== Pop Chassid ===
Nehorai began blogging as Pop Chassid in 2010. The blog initially focused on movies and chassidus, examining pop culture through a Jewish lens, but gradually Nehorai began writing about more personal topics such as his struggles with addiction and mental health, his marriage, and his views on religion and politics.

In April 2013, in honor of Yom HaShoah, Nehorai published a Pop Chassid post entitled "20 Photos That Change The Holocaust Narrative", in which he sought to challenge the perception of Holocaust victims as helpless and destitute by showing images of Jews defying and ultimately surviving Nazi persecution. The post subsequently went viral, reaching 22,000 likes on Facebook and temporarily crashing the Pop Chassid site due to the traffic. Nehorai later published a sequel post, "20 More Photos That Change The Holocaust Narrative", in 2016.

Another post published in 2013, "I Didn't Love My Wife When We Got Married", wherein Nehorai discussed his relationship with his wife and his thoughts on love in general, went similarly viral. Tracy Moore, writing for Jezebel, said of the piece: "It's worth a read for its unique perspective, but also for its universal truths: Your definition of love changes as your relationship grows; it becomes more about the effort you make and less about a feeling that has consumed you."

=== "I Have A Therapist" ===
In 2013, Nehorai helped launch "I Have A Therapist", a campaign intended to promote mental health awareness and destigmatize therapy. The campaign took the form of a Tumblr blog which published photos of people holding signs reading "I have a therapist", "Therapy is awesome", and similar messages, as well as accounts by visitors of their personal experiences with mental illness. Nehorai was inspired by conversations with Chasidic singer-songwriter Esther Freeman, as well as his own experience with bipolar disorder, and financed the blog through Charidy, a web fundraising startup of which he was co-founder and chief marketing officer. More than 5,400 people visited the site between October 16 and November 4, 2013.

=== "Sleeping on Strangers on the Subway" photo and video ===
That same year, Nehorai discovered a photo on Reddit showing 65-year-old Jewish man Isaac Theil allowing a tired fellow passenger on the Brooklyn-bound Q train to rest on his shoulder. Moved by the image, Nehorai shared the photo to the Charidy Facebook page; the picture subsequently went viral, garnering over one million likes and nearly 200,000 shares on Facebook.

Inspired by the photo's popularity, Charidy subsequently produced a video, created by Nehorai and filmmaker Saul Sudin, showing an actor resting his head on the shoulders of various subway passengers while a camera records their reactions. The goal, according to Nehorai, was "to show that it should be normal, and that there are a lot of people who would be willing to do this kind of nice thing."

=== New York Times Israel ad ===
In October of 2015, Nehorai started a GoFundMe campaign to buy a full-page advertisement in The New York Times challenging what he saw as biased media coverage of Israel. The ad included the text, "The media hasn't told Israel's story...so now we have to" as well as a list of recent terror attacks in Israel that the paper had neglected to report on. Posted on October 8, the campaign received closed to a thousand donors and over 8,000 shares on social media, and raised $30,000 in 5 days. The goal was initially set at $118,000 but was lowered to $33,000 after the organization StandWithUs noticed the campaign and agreed to let Nehorai buy the ad under their non-profit status. The campaign ultimately reached its goal and the ad ran in the paper's October 17 issue.

=== Hevria ===
Nehorai and fellow writer Matthue Roth co-founded the website Hevria (a combination of the Hebrew words hevre, group, and bria, creation) in August 2014. Beginning as a collaborative group blog for personal essays, poetry, and fiction writing, the website evolved into a creative collective hosting communal gatherings, arts workshops, weekend retreats, "creative farbrengens", and other events. Other Hevria projects have included "Hevria Sessions", a series of live studio performances by up-and-coming Jewish musicians such as Levi Robin and Bulletproof Stockings, and Neshamas, a sister site that publishes anonymous stories involving sensitive topics such as abuse and mental illness in the religious Jewish community. In 2016, Nehorai and filmmaker Matthew Bowman began producing through Hevria a five episode documentary web series on the Israeli community of Bat Ayin.

On January 2, 2020, Nehorai announced that he would be stepping down as editor of Hevria, citing concerns that the attention he was receiving as an activist was distracting from the site's mission. He clarified that Roth would be taking over the site's leadership and that he would remain involved in a less visible capacity.

==== HevriaCast ====
From 2017 to 2019, Nehorai also hosted HevriaCast, the site's official podcast, wherein he interviewed artists, writers, and other creatives in the Jewish world. The podcast was recorded at CLAL Studios in New York City, and the standard intro and outro music was "Voice Lessons" by Darshan. The show's guests included Hasidic artist Yitzchok Moully, comedian Mendy Pellin, writer and activist Shais Rishon, filmmakers Amy Guterson and Leah Gottfried, social media influencer Adina Sash, and musicians Dalia Shusterman, Isaiah Rothstein, Bram Presser, Jon Madof, Basya Schechter, and Eprhyme.

=== Torah Trumps Hate ===
Nehorai is the former executive director of Torah Trumps Hate, a grassroots organization that mobilizes Orthodox Jews for progressive causes and demonstrations. The organization began as a secret Facebook group created by entertainment lawyer Victoria Cook on November 10, 2016, following the election of Donald Trump in the 2016 United States presidential election; Nehorai joined later as a leader of the group. The group was further galvanized following the infamous 2017 Unite the Right rally in Charlottesville, Virginia and the lackluster response from Orthodox leadership, making the transition to public activism.

In September 2017, members of Torah Trumps Hate participated in the March for Racial Justice in Brooklyn, one of several nationwide marches in response to the shooting of Philando Castile. During Tisha B'Av of 2019, Torah Trumps Hate joined a coalition with T'ruah, the National Council of Jewish Women, Bend the Arc, the Religious Action Center of Reform Judaism, HIAS and J Street to stand in solidarity with immigrant communities and organize Jewish vigils outside U.S. Immigration and Customs Enforcement (ICE) offices throughout the United States. The organization has also assisted immigrants navigating immigration procedures at airports, cosponsored a February 2018 protest advocating for Dreamers, and mobilized members for nationwide protests such as the Lights for Liberty March, held in Philadelphia on July 12, 2019, the eve of proposed ICE raids that had been threatened by the Trump administration.

=== Other work ===
Nehorai contributed to a 2017 Limmud conference in New York, hosting a workshop session on creativity and fear.

In February 2019, Nehorai interacted on Twitter with New York State Rep. Alexandria Ocasio-Cortez after she had tweeted positively about a phone call with then-Labour Party MP Jeremy Corbyn, who had in the past been regularly accused of antisemitism and of mishandling allegations thereof within the party. Nehorai replied to the tweet, saying "I’m a huge huge fan of yours. I hope you’ll take a look at the amount of Jews trying to call attention to Corbyn’s long, documented history of anti-Semitism.The left’s blind spot in this regard can still be fixed. But we need leaders like yourself to listen." Ocasio-Cortez responded favorably, and the two later discussed Corbyn during a private phone call.

On October 25, 2019, Nehorai filmed NYPD officers entering a subway car he was in and drawing guns on, tackling, frisking, and arresting Adrian Napier, an unarmed Black teenager, finding no weapons on him but charging him with fare evasion. Nehorai subsequently posted the footage to his Twitter with the caption "In case you’re wondering how an arrest in NYC goes down. The guy has made absolutely no indication that he would flee or fight and wasn’t trying to hide. If you can’t see, the reason everyone moved was because all the police had taken out their guns and aimed at him." He later told the Washington Post that the police had briefly pointed their guns at everyone in the vicinity. The footage he posted was viewed over 3 million times and sparked public scrutiny of the arrest, leading to an official statement by the department and condemnation of the officers by Democratic politician Julian Castro.

== Personal life ==
Nehorai lives in Los Angeles (previously Crown Heights, Brooklyn, and Long Beach, California) with his wife Rivka, a painter, and their 3 children. The couple had known each other growing up in Chicago and reconnected as adults while studying in Israel.

A baal teshuva, Nehorai initially aligned himself with Chabad, but in 2014 began embracing Modern Orthodox Judaism and the Torah Umadda philosophy, although he maintained some aspects of Hasidic ideology as well as a love for the Lubavitcher Rebbe. He later cited both intercommunity conflict and changes in his own personal philosophy as reasons for his departure from Chabad. As of 2021, he no longer identifies as Orthodox.

Nehorai has bipolar disorder and has written extensively about his struggles with mental health.

== Writings ==
=== E-books ===
- 10 Survival Tips For Baal Teshuvas (2013)

=== Short stories ===
- "The Crow In Your Chest" (2017)
- "The Clay Man With The Spikes" (2017)
- "Run from Consequence " (2018)

=== Poems ===
- "The Subway And G-d" (2013)
- "Let My Soul Go" (2014)
- "6 Poems About Burnout" (2017)
