= Dania Gutiérrez =

Mexican bioengineer, researcher, activist

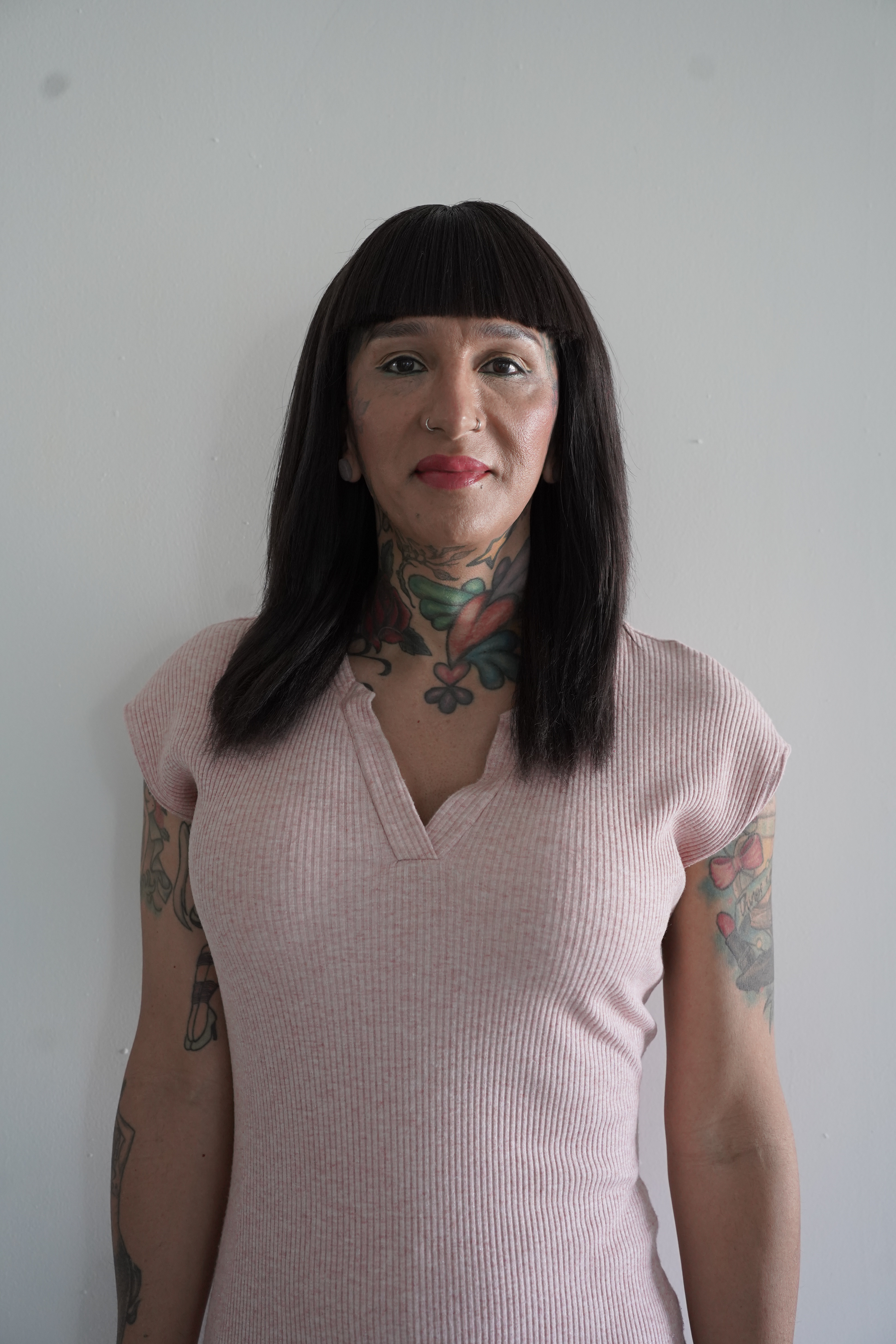
- Gutiérrez in 2026
- Born: Mexico City, Mexico
- Other name: Dania Gutiérrez Ruiz
- Education: National Autonomous University of Mexico (BS), University of Illinois Chicago (MS, PhD)
- Occupations: Bioengineer, researcher, LGBTQ+ activist
- Website: dgtz.mx

Dania Gutiérrez Ruiz is a Mexican bioengineer, researcher, and LGBTQ+ activist. She specializes in the study of human brain function through biomedical signal processing. She has worked as a researcher at the Center for Research and Advanced Studies of the National Polytechnic Institute (CINVESTAV) Monterrey Unit. She is recognized for her scientific work and her activism in support of LGBTQ+ rights, and is one of the most visible trans women in Mexican academia.

== Early life and education ==
Dania Gutiérrez was born in Mexico City. Gutiérrez was assigned male at birth, and as a young child she knew something was different and felt a need to express a feminine side. She suffered epileptic seizures during adolescence, which made her interested in studying the brain.

Gutiérrez studied mechanical and electrical engineering, specializing in electronics, and graduated in 1997 from the National Autonomous University of Mexico. She had dreamed of working within a Formula One team, designing electrical circuits.

After completing her undergraduate degree, she continued her studies in the United States, obtaining a master's degree in 2000 in electronic engineering and computer science from the University of Illinois Chicago. She obtained her doctorate in 2005 in bioengineering from the same institution, where her doctoral advisor was Arye Nehorai. She completed a postdoctoral fellowship during the period 2005–2006 at the Institute of Research in Applied Mathematics and Systems of the National Autonomous University of Mexico.

In 2000, she began her hormone replacement therapy in the United States. Her gender transition was completed in 2009.

== Career ==
She has worked as a senior researcher at CINVESTAV since 2006, where she has developed her career as a scientist. Between 2015 and 2020, she held the position of academic secretary at the same research center in the Monterrey unit, in Nuevo León, Mexico.

Her research focuses on the statistical processing of biomedical signals. She also works with brain–computer interfaces and human–computer interaction. She directs the biomedical signal processing laboratory where she and her students conduct research for biomedical applications. Other research projects include the processing of bioelectromagnetic transducer arrays, neurocognition, and neurofeedback.

In addition to her work as a scientist, Gutiérrez has been an activist for LGBTQ+ rights. She participates in various events where she shares her experience and journey as a transgender woman, and fights to prevent others from suffering discrimination based on sexual orientation. She has given talks focused on the empowerment of the women in science, and sexual and gender diversity.
