= Shayna Goldberg =

American–Israeli Modern Orthodox and Religious Zionist author and educator

Rabbanit Shayna Goldberg שיינה גולדברג

Personal life
- Born: 1979 (age 46–47)
- Spouse: Judah Goldberg
- Education: Stern College for Women, Azrieli Graduate School of Jewish Education and Administration

Religious life
- Religion: Judaism
- Denomination: Modern Orthodoxy, Religious Zionism
- Position: Mashgicha Ruchanit
- Organisation: Migdal Oz (seminary)
- Residence: Alon Shevut

Rabbanit Shayna Goldberg (Hebrew: שיינה גולדברג; born 1979) is an American–Israeli Modern Orthodox and Religious Zionist author, educator, and Yoetzet Halacha (halachic advisor). She is the current Mashgicha Ruchanit at the Stella K. Abraham Beit Midrash for Women Migdal Oz, an affiliate of Yeshivat Har Etzion.

== Biography ==
Rabbanit Shayna grew up in Great Neck, New York, the daughter of Rabbi Yaacov Lerner and Abby Lerner. Her father was a student of Rabbi Aharon Lichtenstein at Yeshiva University and served as Rabbi of the Young Israel of Great Neck for 45 years. Goldberg received an undergraduate degree in Judaic Studies from Stern College for Women, and went on to pursue a master's degree in Secondary Jewish Education at Azrieli Graduate School of Jewish Education and Administration, while simultaneously studying Talmud and halacha as a scholar in their graduate program in Advanced Talmudic Studies.

Goldberg is a graduate of Nishmat's Keren Ariel Program for certification as a Yoetzet Halacha in issues of family purity law. She served as a Yoetzet Halacha for several New Jersey synagogues, namely Congregation Rinat Yisrael, Congregation Ahavat Torah, and Kehilat Kesher. She was the first employed Yoetzet Halacha in New Jersey and second in the United States. During this time she also taught at the Kohelet Yeshiva in Philadelphia and Ma’ayanot Yeshiva High School in Teaneck.

In 2011 Goldberg made aliyah to Alon Shevut, Gush Etzion. At this time she took on the position of Mashgicha Ruchanit at Migdal Oz. She teaches both Israeli and American students. Her husband, Rabbi Dr. Judah Goldberg, a bioethicist and brother of Rabbi Efrem Goldberg of Boca Raton, works as a Jewish educator at Michlelet Mevaseret Yerushalayim (MMY), and an emergency physician at Shaare Zedek Medical Center.

Goldberg is the author of the book “What Do You Really Want? Trust and Fear in Decision Making at Life’s Crossroads and in Everyday Living,” which she published in 2021. She also serves as a contributing editor for Deracheha: Women and Mitzvot and is a frequent blogger for Times of Israel. She is an advocate for expanding Torah learning and religious opportunities for women in Judaism within the bounds of halakha.

== Personal ==
Shayna Goldberg is married to Rabbi Dr. Judah Goldberg. They live in Alon Shvut and have five children.
