= Shaindel =

Shaindel is a feminine given name. Notable people with the name include:

- Shaindel Antelis
- Shaindel Kalish, American actress
