= Miriam Leah Gamliel =

American Orthodox Jewish actress, singer and activist

- Born: Lani Droz; 1976 (age 49–50); Pittsburgh, Pennsylvania, U.S.
- Education: Taylor Allderdice High School; Touro College
- Occupations: Actress, singer, dancer, activist
- Years active: 2006–present
- Spouse: Michael Gamliel (m. 2013)
- Website: artsandtorah.org

Miriam Leah Gamliel (born Lani Droz; 1976 in Pittsburgh, Pennsylvania) is an American Orthodox Jewish actress, singer, and activist. A baalat teshuva with a background in musical theatre, she is the founder of the Arts and Torah Association for Religious Artists (ATARA), an organization promoting Orthodox women in the arts. In 2012, she was named one of The Jewish Week's "36 Under 36", a list of influential Jewish figures under age 36.

== Early life ==
Gamliel was born in Pittsburgh, Pennsylvania, to a Conservative Jewish family. She studied at a local music conservatory before switching to Barnard College. She also studied musical theater at Pennsylvania State University.

While pursuing a Bachelor of Fine Arts in musical theater, she took a year-long trip to Israel to study abroad at She'arim College of Jewish Studies for Women in Har Nof, which motivated her to become religious. Told that theater was incompatible with an Orthodox lifestyle, she abandoned the field for several years.

Upon returning to the United States, she completed her bachelor's degree from Barnard College in 1999 and earned a master's degree in library sciences. She then attended Touro College's Graduate School of Jewish Studies, where she worked as a librarian and was involved in the Association of Jewish Libraries, graduating with a second master's in Jewish history.

In 2020, Miriam Leah received her Doctorate in School Administration from Yeshiva University.

== Arts and Torah Association for Religious Artists (ATARA) ==
Gamliel co-founded the Arts and Torah Association for Religious Artists (ATARA) in late 2006 while she was a student at Touro. ATARA provides arts education, performance opportunities, and other resources to Orthodox female artists looking to express themselves within the boundaries of halacha. Gamliel was inspired to develop ATARA after being commissioned to direct an all-female version of A... My Name Is Alice for Congregation Ohab Zedek in Manhattan.

The organization is best known for its annual three-day Arts & Torah Conference, which features performances and workshops in music, theatre, poetry, dance, and film. Presenters have included Rachel Factor, Shaindel Antelis, and former New York City Ballet dancer Dena Abergel, while conference events have been held at Merkin Concert Hall, Kaufman Center, and Stern College for Women.

== Personal life ==
A former resident of Brooklyn, Gamliel currently lives in Montreal with her husband, Michael Gamliel, and children. As an adult, she has studied at the Drisha Institute and Yeshiva University's Azrieli Graduate School of Jewish Education and Administration. She is the program director of the Broadway Kids program at Shulamith School for Girls.

== Credits ==
=== As actress ===
Year	Title	Role	Director
2011	Barons & Bankers: The Story of the Rothschilds	Gutle Rothschild	Miriam Handler
2014	Changed	Mayor	Malky Giniger
2014	Alexandra	Grandmama	Malky Giniger
2017	Kosher Love	As herself	Evan Beloff

=== As director ===
Year	Title	Notes
2006	A... My Name Is Alice	Stage
2009	The House on Riverside	Film

=== Other credits ===
- Mister Rogers' Neighborhood (1998) (Season 28, Episode 14: "Little and Big") (location producer)
