= Arts education =

Arts education may refer to:

- Performing arts education
- Visual arts education
- Arts in education, an expanding field of educational research
- Arts Education Policy Review, academic journal
