= Leah Gottfried =

American actress and filmmaker

- Born: Leah Gottfried; April 1991 (age 35); Monsey, New York, U.S.
- Occupations: Actress, writer, producer, director
- Years active: 2006–present
- Notable work: Soon By You
- Website: leahgottfried.com

Leah Gottfried (born April 1991) is an American actress and filmmaker, best known for creating and starring in the web series Soon By You. In 2017, she was featured in The Jewish Week's "36 Under 36", an annual list of influential Jews under age 36.

== Early life ==
Gottfried was born in 1991 in Monsey, New York, to a Haredi Orthodox Jewish family. After her parents divorced when she was five, she and her mother, Esther Litchfield-Fink, moved to Flatbush and transitioned to Modern Orthodox Judaism. Gottfried became interested in acting at age eight, and at 11 she began directing friends in recreations of her favorite TV episodes using her mother's camcorder. She attended local Orthodox schools, where she was discouraged by teachers from pursuing an acting career. Despite this, her mother was supportive and helped her audition for commercials, although she often ended up dropping out because shooting schedules conflicted with Shabbat; this motivated her to pursue writing and directing in order to set her own schedule for projects.

At age 14, Gottfried and her mother moved to Los Angeles and she began appearing in commercials for Yamaha ATV and Time Warner Cable, among others. She lived in Los Angeles for six years and attended Valley Torah High School. During the summer of 2005, she attended Kol Neshama, a summer arts conservatory for teen girls led by Orthodox filmmaker Robin Garbose; Garbose became a mentor to Gottfried, who later worked on her films The Heart That Sings (2011) and Operation: Candlelight (2014). She made her first major film appearance in the 2007 boxing comedy The Hammer, where she played a secretary.

After spending a post-high school year in Israel, Gottfried attended Yeshiva University's Stern College for Women, where she created a shaped major in film and became the school's first student to graduate with a Film Studies degree in 2014. She also took a cinematography course at New York University as part of this major.

== Career ==
Gottfried founded her own production company, Dignity Entertainment, in 2011 while at Stern. After directing several music videos, most notably for Orthodox pop artist Shaindel Antelis, she directed, wrote, and produced the short film Angie's Song in 2014. She has also appeared onstage as Nora Morton in Brighton Beach Memoirs, Gert in Lost in Yonkers, and Anna in The Government Inspector. She had a brief role in the 2021 Jewish dance comedy film Tango Shalom.

=== Soon By You ===
In 2016, Gottfried created the YouTube comedy web series Soon By You. Conceiving of the show as a combination of Friends and Srugim centered around Orthodox singles navigating the shidduch system in New York, Gottfried developed the show with producers Danny Hoffman and Jessica Schechter; all three also star in the series. The pilot episode, "The Setup", won Best Short at the 2016 Washington Jewish Film Festival, and the first season received over a million views on YouTube.

== Personal life ==
Gottfried is married to Isaiah Rothstein, a rabbi and musician who is the lead singer for the band Zayah and rabbi-in-residence at Hazon. The two met at a Hevria open-mic night event in late 2017 where both were performing (her reading a poem, him performing music); she later attended a talk he gave at the 2018 Limmud NY conference in Monsey and co-directed a music video for his band Zayah, and he eventually proposed to her via song later that year. The two were married on June 16, 2019, at Oz Farm in Saugerties, New York.

She has cited Rama Burshtein, Greta Gerwig, and Ava DuVernay as directing influences, particularly noting DuVernay for how she “brings stories about people who are marginalized to the forefront”.

== Filmography ==
=== Film and TV ===
Year	Title	Role	Actor	Director	Writer	Producer	Self	Notes
2006	Distant Roads	Host / daughter					check	Episodes: "Wyoming", "Indiana"
2006	Camp Bnos Yisrael	Reisy Rubin	check					Direct-to-video; Episode 1: "Together as One"
2007	The Lockdown Club	Cheerleader	check					Short film
2007	The Hammer	Secretary	check					
2011	The Heart That Sings	Libby Guggenheim	check	check				Second assistant director
2014	Angie's Song			check	check	check		Short film
2014	Operation: Candlelight	Officer Smith	check			check		line producer
2016–present	Soon By You	Sarah Jacobs	check	check	check	check		Main cast and series creator
2018	My Million Dollar Mom	Girl at Bar Mitvah	check					Short film
2018	The Cheeseburger	Shira	check					Short film
2021	Tango Shalom	Wedding Guest	check					

=== Music videos ===
Year	Song	Artist	Notes
2011	"Change"	Shaindel Antelis	
2012	"The Light"	Shaindel Antelis	
2013	"The Palace"	Shaindel Antelis	
2014	"Spilling Wine"	Barefoot City	
2014	"Hooleh!"	8th Day	Line producer and first assistant director
2014	"Suspended"	Livia LVX	
2014	"Invisible"	Shaindel Antelis	
2014	"Chanukah Light"	Ari Goldwag	Assistant director
2015	"Criminal Love"	Carl Man	Producer
2015	"By Your Side"	Shaindel Antelis	Also editor
2017	"Honey You'll Survive"	Rivky Saxon	
2017	"Shiru L'Hashem"	Franciska	
2018	"Modeh Ani"	Zayah	With Isaiah Rothstein
