= Amy Guterson =

Amy Gordon Guterson
- Born: Amy Gordon; 1965 (age 60–61)
- Education: Stern College for Women
- Occupations: Actress, director, educator
- Years active: 1995–present
- Known for: Agent Emes
- Board member of: ATARA
- Spouse: John Guterson
- Children: 4
- Website: tzoharseminary.com kolisha.org

Amy Gordon Guterson (born 1967) is an American Orthodox Jewish actress, filmmaker, and educator. She is best known for her role as Chaya Epstein in the long-running video series Agent Emes. She is the founder and director of the Tzohar Seminary for Chassidus and the Arts and co-founder of the Jewish women's theater troupe Kol Isha. She is also a board member of the Arts and Torah Association for Religious Artists (ATARA), founded by Miriam Leah Droz.

== Early life ==
Guterson was born in Pittsburgh, Pennsylvania to a Modern Orthodox family. She attended high school at Hebrew Academy of the Five Towns and Rockaway and studied theater at Stern College for Women in New York, where she was the school's first theater major and played Hannah Szenes in a one-woman show. Following her graduation from Stern in 1988, she studied with Uta Hagen at the HB Studio and with Mike Nichols and Paul Sills at The New Actors Workshop, where she received a graduate degree in acting. She also performed in Off-Broadway plays as well as Jewish repertory and Yiddish theatre, earning Actors' Equity Association membership.

== Career ==
=== Kol Isha ===
After getting married and settling in Squirrel Hill, Guterson began educating artists and actresses in the community through the local Chabad. During this time she met Barb Feige, an actress and stage manager, and the two formed Kol Isha, a Jewish women's theatre troupe, in 1995. The following year, the troupe performed their first play, An Invisible Thread, at the Squirrel Hill Jewish Community Center.

The group's second play, Journey Through Ruth, about modern-day women encountering the Biblical figures of Ruth and Naomi, premiered in 1998. A third play, The Choosing, premiered in 1999 at Pittsburgh's City Theatre; that same year, the troupe performed a Hanukkah play entitled Hannukah Lights. In 2001 they performed Spirits of Valor, which portrayed the historical Jewish women Bella Abzug, Barbara Myerhoff, Molly Picon, Emma Lazarus, and Glückel of Hameln, at the Jewish Community Center of Greater Pittsburgh in celebration of Jewish Women's History Month. Another play, Imagining Bubbe, based on stories told by the troupe members' grandmothers, premiered in 2007.

In addition to their productions, the troupe have also presented workshops and small performances at such venues as the Jewish Orthodox Feminist Alliance and Pittsburgh's Congregation Beth Shalom.

=== Tzohar Seminary ===
In October 2011, Guterson opened the Tzohar Seminary for Chassidus and the Arts in Pittsburgh, a post-high school arts program for Orthodox Jewish girls. The name "Tzohar" comes from the Hebrew term for "window" used in the Biblical description of Noah's Ark, which also translates to "precious stone". Tzohar curriculum combines Torah study and arts education, with classes in creativity and the arts, Hasidic teachings, writing, music, dance, fine arts, theatre, filmmaking, Tanya, and the weekly Torah portion. The school's principal is Rabbi Dovid Hordiner, and teachers have included Agent Emes creator Leibel Cohen and author and columnist Rabbi Shais Taub.

=== Film ===
In 2005, Guterson wrote, directed, and co-produced the short film Becoming Rachel, which stars Guterson's daughter, Tanya, and premiered at the 12th annual Pittsburgh Jewish-Israeli Film Festival. The film was based on a fable Guterson's grandmother had told her, which she would later use for a segment in Imagining Bubbe.

== Personal life ==
Guterson lives in the Squirrel Hill neighborhood of Pittsburgh with her husband, Dr. John Guterson, and their children.

== Credits ==
=== Acting ===
Year	Title	Role	Notes
2003-2012	Agent Emes	Chaya Epstein	Video series; recurring role

=== Film ===
Year	Title	Credit(s)	Notes
2005	Becoming Rachel	Director, writer, co-producer (with Chaza Tombosky)	Short film

=== Theatre ===
Year	Title	Credit(s)	Notes
1996	An Invisible Thread	Writer	First Kol Isha production
1998	Journey Through Ruth	Writer	Kol Isha production
1999	The Choosing		Kol Isha production
1999	Hanukkah Lights		Kol Isha production
2001	Spirits of Valor		Kol Isha production
2007	Imagining Bubbe	Director	Kol Isha production
2008	Can You Imagine?	Director	
