= Max van Weezel =

Dutch journalist and politician (1951–2019)

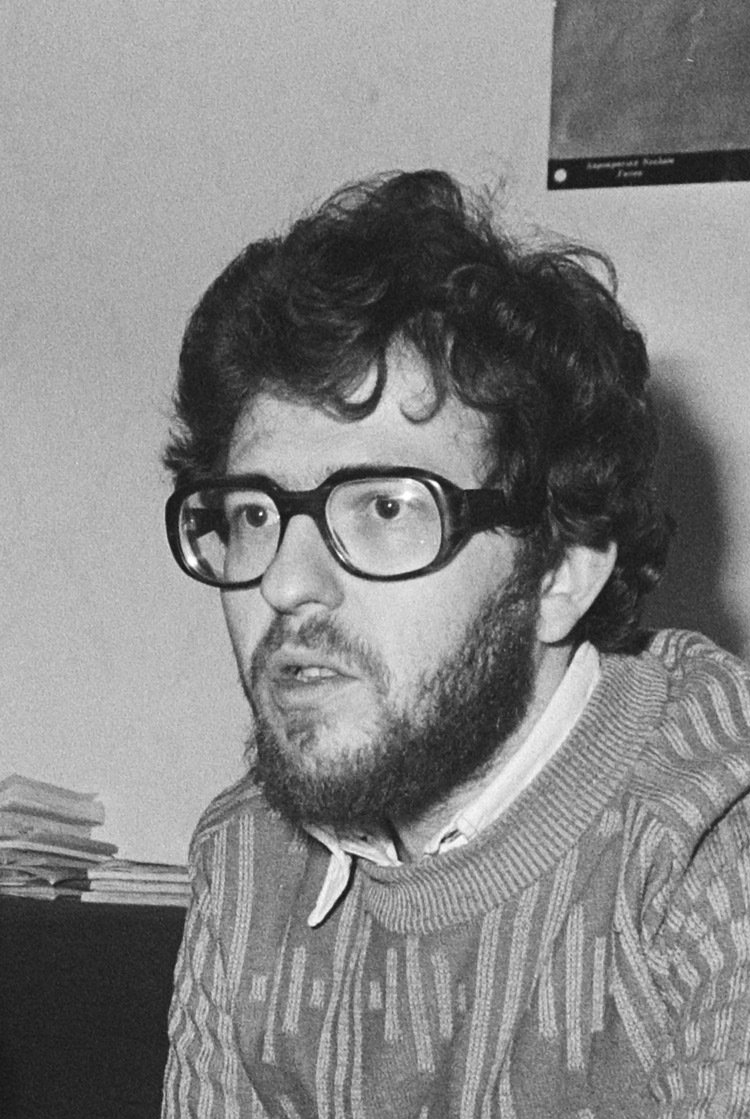
Max van Weezel

Max Hans van Weezel (9 July 1951 – 11 April 2019) was a Dutch journalist and politician. He was also a political writer and commentator for the Vrij Nederland.

== Biography ==
Van Weezel was one of two sons of Carry Blitz and Richard van Weezel. He graduated from Stedelijk high school in Leiden in 1969 and studied politics and social studies at the University of Amsterdam. Van Weezel was active at ASVS General Student Association Amsterdam, as an education secretary.

Between 1973 and 1976 he was a member of CPN and along with his wife journalist Anet Bleich, he released the book Ga dan zelf naar Siberië! (1978). In 1976, he started as a journalist at Vrij Nederland, where he wrote the column 'Het Wereldje'. In 1981, he became the political editor of Vrij Nederland, and stayed in that position until 1998. In 2000, he became the vice-editor of Vrid Nederland. In 2004, he became the political commentator for the paper. He became the chairman of International Press Centre Nieuwspoort between 2007 and 2011. He won the Anne Vondeling-award twice, in 1983 and 1994.

== Bibliography ==
- Max van Weezel & Anet Bleich: Ga dan zelf naar Siberië! Linkse intellektuelen en de koude oorlog. Amsterdam, Socialistiese Uitgeverij, 1978. ISBN 9062220452
- Joop van Tijn en Max van Weezel: Inzake het kabinet Lubbers. Amsterdam, Sijthoff, 1986. ISBN 9021827778
- Max van Weezel en Leonard Ornstein: Frits Bolkestein. Portret van een liberale vrijbuiter. Amsterdam, Prometheus, 1999. ISBN 9053336729
- Max van Weezel en Leonard Ornstein: Op heilige grond: achter de schermen van het vredesproces in het Midden-Oosten. Amsterdam, Prometheus, 2001. ISBN 9044600117
- Max van Weezel en Michiel Zonneveld: De onttovering van Paars. Een geschiedenis van de kabinetten-Kok. Amsterdam, Van Gennep, 2002. ISBN 9055153273
- Margalith Kleijwegt en Max van Weezel: Het land van haat en nijd. Hoe Nederland radicaal veranderde. Amsterdam, Balans, 2006. ISBN 9050187633
- Thijs Broer en Max van Weezel: De geroepene. Het wonderlijke premierschap van Jan Peter Balkenende. Amsterdam, Balans, 2007. ISBN 9789050188500
- Max van Weezel: Haagse fluisteraars. Amsterdam, Balans, 2011. ISBN 9789460033513
