= Never Mind the Goldbergs =

2005 novel by Matthue Roth

- Author: Matthue Roth
- Language: English, Hebrew, Yiddish
- Genre: Young adult, realistic fiction, drama, Jewish literature
- Publisher: PUSH
- Publication date: 2005
- Pages: 368
- ISBN: 978-0-545-23187-9
- Preceded by: Yom Kippur a Go-Go
- Followed by: Candy in Action

Never Mind the Goldbergs is a 2005 novel by Matthue Roth. Its plot follows the seventeen-year-old Hava Aaronson, an Orthodox Jewish girl living in New York City, as she is invited to live in Hollywood for the summer to star on a fictional television show, The Goldbergs.

== Plot summary ==
Living in Los Angeles is Hava's first experience living outside the Orthodox Jewish world, however, and she finds herself questioning her relationship to Judaism, to Orthodoxy, and to God. These are illustrated through quirky, often humorous episodes, including one where Hava is unwittingly kept working until Shabbos, and another where she stumbles into a man who may or may not be Orson Welles. The book's unconventional tone and unpredictable nature have elicited comparisons to Kurt Vonnegut and Francesca Lia Block. The book's centerpiece, a scene where Hava and her friend Moish flee the sitcom set and road-trip to Berkeley, California. Some of the personalities are based on real people, including an Orthodox film director and a Hasidic rebbetzin who is also a hip-hop M.C.

== Background ==
Roth has admitted that much of the book pertains to his own struggle between his Orthodox religion, punk culture, and not fitting in with other fundamentalists. Its title was not originally intended as a reference to The Goldbergs, the radio show created by Gertrude Berg in 1929, which Roth has said he discovered halfway through writing the novel, but he kept it as a panegyric.

== Reception ==
Since its release, the book has become embraced by a small cult following in the Orthodox and Hasidic communities.
