= Matthue Roth =

American author and poet

- Born: Matthew Roth; June 30, 1978 (age 48); Philadelphia, Pennsylvania
- Genres: Spoken word; alternative hip hop; nerdcore
- Occupations: Poet; rapper; author; journalist; screenwriter; video game designer
- Instrument: Vocals
- Years active: 2001–present
- Website: matthue.com

Matthew "Matthue" Roth (born June 30, 1978) is an American author, poet, columnist, spoken word performer, video game designer, and screenwriter.

Beginning his career as a slam poet in San Francisco, Roth gained attention for his unusual blend of religious themes with frank sexual material, and appeared in the 2002 live Broadway production of Def Poetry Jam. As a writer, he has written three young adult novels, two children's books, and two memoirs, and has written for The Forward, Tablet, and Jewcy. He also co-founded the Jewish culture website Hevria, with Elad Nehorai, and the Jewish educational website G-dcast (later BimBam), with Sarah Lefton.

In 2018, Roth's short story "One Part Finger" was shortlisted for the Best American Short Stories. In 2009, Roth's novel Losers was chosen as a special selection of the American Library Association. In 2014, Roth and his now ex-wife, restaurateur Itta Werdiger-Roth, were included in The Jewish Week's "36 Under 36", a list of influential young Jews under age 36.

== Early life ==
Roth's parents were both teachers. While he was raised in a Conservative Jewish family and participated in an Orthodox youth group, he was largely nonreligious for several years and was an anarchist in high school. Roth's parents bought him a computer when he was 13, which he used to write for several websites as well as his first novel, Colony One, which he later called "horrible". When he was 14, a female friend of his was sexually assaulted, which he later said "kind of sent me into a tailspin...I was like, this is male sexuality and male sexuality is violent and I don’t want a part of that...One of the only safe spaces that I found was hanging around queer people." The memory loosely inspired his later young adult novel, Rules of My Best Friend's Body.

Roth graduated from George Washington University, where he studied anthropology and religion. During this time, he developed a deeper interest in Judaism and joined a daily minyan on campus. He also began growing peyos while studying abroad at Charles University in Prague.

== Career ==
=== Spoken word ===
After graduation, Roth remained in Washington, D.C. and worked as a sociological trend consultant, but was unsatisfied with his social life there and "desperately wanted to get out." After a friend gave him a copy of the novel Valencia by author Michelle Tea, Roth found himself drawn to the book's portrayal of San Francisco's subculture and moved to the city, where he lived from 2001 to 2004.

While living in San Francisco, Roth met up with Tea and other former Sister Spit members and began performing poetry and spoken word at local clubs. During the 2000s, he performed at the Intersection for the Arts with Tea, Dave Eggers, and Beth Lisick; at a Chabad menorah lighting event at Justin Herman Plaza with Shlomo Katz and Carlos Santana; the Daniland Talent Showcase alongside the Suicide Kings, Sini Anderson, Carlos Mena, and Aya de Leon; and a 2002 Broadway production of Def Poetry Jam. He also performed at Solomon Schechter High School of New York and at the Hillel House of Pennsylvania State University.

In 2009, Roth and rapper Mista Cookie Jar formed the nerdcore hip hop duo Chibi Vision. They debuted with The Chanukah Mini-EP and announced a full-length album, The Elements of Style, shortly afterward. They were featured on a 2011 segment of The Henry Rollins Show on KCRW.

=== Literary career ===
In 2005, Cleis Press published Roth's first full-length book, the memoir Yom Kippur a Go-Go, named for a zine he had written three years prior. Jason Diamond of Flavorwire later described it as "striking a balance between [Roth's] old-time religious beliefs and modern-world interests, from poetry to hip hop."

That same year, Roth published his first young adult novel, Never Mind the Goldbergs, through Scholastic's PUSH imprint. While the book was written in six months, it took two years to edit, and Roth encountered difficulty finding a publisher for the book due to its unusual tone and subject matter. Upon release, the book garnered mixed reception but received the American Library Association Popular Paperbacks for Young Adults award and the New York Public Library Best Book for the Teen Age award. A release party was held on January 20, 2005, at La Tazza 108 in Philadelphia with musical performances by Juez and E.D. Sedgwick. Roth subsequently published two more young adult novels, Candy in Action in 2007 and Losers in 2008, on PUSH and Soft Skull Press, respectively.

Roth published his first children's book with My First Kafka: Runaways, Rodents, and Giant Bugs, released on June 15, 2013. Illustrated by Rohan Daniel Eason, the book reinterprets the works of Franz Kafka for a child audience, specifically "The Metamorphosis", "Josephine the Singer, or The Mouse Folk", and "Excursion into the Mountains" from Contemplation. Roth conceived of the project while reading "Jackals and Arabs" to his two young daughters. He and Eason re-teamed the following year for The Gobblings, about a lonely boy on a space station who must defeat a race of metal-eating monsters.

Roth published a new young adult novel, Rules of My Best Friend's Body, in 2017. The novel, about a teenage boy whose female friend is sexually assaulted, was originally intended for publication through Fig Tree Books, but Roth ended up self-publishing, and the book was made available for both free online download and physical order. Roth conducted a public reading of the book at Jefferson Market Library.

Roth released Somehow I Have Built A Nest, a micro-chapbook and collection of poems published through Ghost City Press as part of their Summer 2021 series. Like his previous novel, Somehow I Have Built A Nest was made available for free online.

In February 2022, Roth spoke as part of a symposium on "Jewish Writing vs. Writing by Jews", moderated by Goldie Goldbloom for the Association of Writers & Writing Programs conference in Tampa, Florida. Other participants were Sarah Stone, Yehoshua November, and Riva Lehrer.

=== Other projects ===
==== Amplify ====
Prior to 2015, Roth was a lead writer and developer of educational software games for the company Amplify. He was one of several of Amplify employees laid off after its sale by parent company News Corp in 2015.

==== BimBam (G-dcast) ====
In 2012, Roth and producer Sarah Lefton co-founded the website and production company G-dcast (later renamed BimBam), having developed the idea since meeting in San Francisco in 2005. The website produced short animated video content based on the weekly parsha, stories from the Talmud, and other parts of the Torah, with the goal of educating children and others learning about Judaism. In addition to his role as co-founder, Roth scripted and edited several videos for the site. BimBam was shut down in April 2019 due to lack of funding.

==== Hevria ====
Roth and activist/blogger Elad Nehorai co-founded the website Hevria in mid-2014. The site's name is a portmanteau of the Hebrew words "chevra" (group or society) and "briah" (creation). Primarily a group blog centered around essays about Judaism and art, the site also features "Hevria Sessions", studio performances by Jewish musicians, and, from 2017 to 2019, an official podcast entitled HevriaCast, where Nehorai interviews various Jewish artists, writers, and musicians. Roth and Nehorai conceived of the project during an email conversation in 2012 with writer Chaya Kurtz, who had gotten attention for an xoJane article entitled "What Women's Media Needs to Know About Chassidic Women"; the three theorized that a full website could give even more insight into Hasidic Jews, and Nehorai subsequently recruited other blogging contacts to participate. Following Nehorai's departure in 2020, Roth took over as editor of the site.

==== 1/20 ====
Roth wrote the screenplay for the independent film 1/20 (2010), a coming-of-age story centered around punk rock and the 2008 presidential election and featuring music from the punk bands Against Me! and Can Can, among others. Roth, who had not done any prior screenwriting, was hired by the producers on the strength of Never Mind the Goldbergs, and partially based the story on his time living in Washington, D.C. Directed by Gerardo del Castillo Ramirez, the movie was primarily shot in Queens, Manhattan, and Monsey, and finished filming in November 2009. Upon release, the film was screened at the Detroit Windsor International Film Festival, the Mexico International Film Festival (where it won the Bronze Palm), the Guadalajara International Film Festival, and Indie Fest, where it won an Award of Merit.

== Personal life ==
Roth is the father of four daughters. He was previously married to Itta Werdiger, a Lubavitcher from Melbourne who founded the kosher restaurants The Hester and Mason & Mug. The couple met in 2004 in Brooklyn while Roth was trying to write for television. At the advice of Werdiger's father-in-law, the couple moved to Nachlaot, Jerusalem so that Roth could study for a year at Yeshivat Simchat Shlomo. He also met with the Biala Rebbe multiple times during this period, and later became a follower.

Roth enrolled in an MFA program in Creative Writing at Brooklyn College, from which he graduated in 2014.

He has an anxiety disorder and has written about his struggles with it.

== Discography ==
=== Solo ===
==== EPs ====
- Live at Metro Cafe (2001)
- Dork (2013)

==== Singles ====
- "Lost Season 6 Spoilers" (2010)
- "Creator" (2015)

==== Featured appearances ====
- 2009: "By Ur Side" (Mistah Cookie Jar ft. Matthue Roth) on Mistah Cookie Jar Presents: The Love Bubble
- 2011: "Dance" (Stereo Sinai ft. Matthue Roth) on Biblegum Pop
- 2015: "Wink Wink..." (Postaltaco ft. Matthue) on Wink Wink.....Nudge Nudge
- 2015: "The Happiness Boys" (Postaltaco ft. Matthue) on Wink Wink.....Nudge Nudge

=== With Chibi Vision ===
- The Chanukah Mini-EP (2009)

== Bibliography ==
=== Memoirs ===
- Yom Kippur a Go-Go (2005, Cleis Press)
- Automatic (2011, independent)

=== Children's books ===
- My First Kafka: Runaways, Rodents, and Giant Bugs (2013)
- The Gobblings (2014)

=== Young adult novels ===
- Never Mind the Goldbergs (2005, PUSH)
- Candy in Action (2007, Soft Skull Press)
- Losers (2008, PUSH)
- Rules of My Best Friend's Body (2017, self-published)

=== Zines ===
- Bellybudding: Post-It Note Poems (2001)
- Platonic (2001)
- Yom Kippur a Go-Go (2002)
- Sometimes I Throw Stuff At This House (2004)

=== Anthology contributions ===
- Bottoms Up: Writing About Sex (2004) (edited by Diana Cage) (Poem: "Waiting for the Man")
- Homewrecker: An Adultery Reader (2005) (edited by Daphne Gottlieb) (Short story: "Beating Around the Burning Bush")
- This Is PUSH: New Stories from the Edge (2007) (edited by David Levithan) (Short story: "The Waitress")
- Democrat's Soul: A Tried-and-True View of Everything Blue (2008) (Short story: "The Only Living Democrat in Brooklyn")
- The Autobiographer's Handbook: The 826 National Guide to Writing Your Memoir (2008) (edited by Jennifer Traig)
- Don't Forget to Write (2011) (edited by Jennifer Traig and Dave Eggers) (Essay: "Word Karaoke: Become a Hip-Hop Lyrical Genius")
- Truth & Dare: 20 Tales of Heartbreak and Happiness (2011) (edited by Liz Miles) (Short story: "Girl Jesus on the Inbound Subway")
- Cornered: 14 Stories of Bullying and Defiance (2012) (edited by Rhoda Belleza) (Short story: "The Ambush")
- Jews vs Aliens (2015) (edited by Lavie Tidhar and Rebecca Levene) (Short story: "The Ghetto")
