= Benzion Klatzko =

Benzion Zvi Klatzko (born June 11, 1968) is a United States-based Orthodox rabbi best known as the founder of Shabbat.com.

== Education ==
Klatzko graduated from Hebrew Academy of Cleveland in 1981, followed by Mesivtha Tifereth Jerusalem of Staten Island. He was ordained at the Mir Yeshiva in Brooklyn, New York on August 13, 1993 by Rabbi Shmuel Berenbaum.

== Career ==
After completing his studies, Klatzko was Rabbi of the Agudath Israel synagogue of 14th Ave (Pirchei Minyan) in Brooklyn, New York, and was then the rabbi of congregation Shaarey Tefiloh in Perth Amboy, New Jersey. In 1999, he was appointed campus rabbi of the University of California, Los Angeles (UCLA), where he organized outreach programs for college students through the Jewish Awareness Movement. During this period, he ran monthly classes on Jewish thought in Hollywood for many writers, producers, actors, and directors in the movie industry earning the moniker "The Hollywood Rabbi". Starting in 2003, Klatzko began to seed other campuses throughout Southern California with Jewish programming (e.g., Classes, Trips, and organizational structure) including USC, UCSB, UCSD, SDSU, SMC, and CSUN. Additionally, he helped start the CLE program in Florida and the JEM program in Madison Wisconsin.

In 2006, the Klatzko family moved to Monsey, New York, where Rabbi Klatzko was appointed national educational director for Olami Worldwide. In which position he is tasked with seeding North American college campuses with Jewish life. Each year Rabbi Klatzko visits and lectures at over 100 campuses.

=== Shabbat.com ===
In 2010, Rabbi Klatzko founded Shabbat.com, a social networking website intended to bring Jews together to celebrate the Sabbath. Shabbat.com is a website as well as an app available on IOS and Android.

== Awards and recognition ==
U.S. Congressman Bob Menendez described Klatzko during a 1997 session of the U.S. House of Representatives as a "distinguished gentleman making a difference to his community".

Jewish Forward magazine included him in their 2014 list of "America's Most Inspiring Rabbis".

== Personal life ==
Klatzko married his wife Shoshana Juravel on June 27, 1988. She is a daughter of the noted children's author and lecturer Rabbi Dovid Juravel. The family currently resides in Monsey, New York.

== Works ==
- The Kuntrus (Maznaim Publications 1999).
