= Dirk Wagener =

German diplomat

H.E. Dirk Wagener

UN Resident Coordinator in Fiji, Solomon Islands, Tonga, Tuvalu, and Vanuatu
- In office July 2023 – present

UNDP Resident Representative in Papua New Guinea
- In office May 2019 – June 2023

Personal details
- Born: 21 April 1971 Kassel, Germany
- Education: Humboldt University of Berlin
- Profession: United Nations diplomat

Dirk Wagener (born 21 April 1971), is a German diplomat and international development official serving as the United Nations Resident Coordinator for the Fiji Multi-Country Office covering Fiji, Solomon Islands, Tonga, Tuvalu, and Vanuatu.

He previously served as United Nations Development Programme (UNDP) Resident Representative in Papua New Guinea beginning in 2019 and as acting UN Resident Coordinator in Papua New Guinea from mid-2021 to mid-2022. Wagener has worked within the United Nations System since 2002, with assignments in Africa, Asia, and the Pacific.

He has been involved in United Nations-supported initiatives related to the Bougainville Peace Process and to the implementation of the Sustainable Development Goals in Papua New Guinea and other Pacific contexts. In 2024, he coordinated the United Nations’ response efforts in Vanuatu following the Port Vila earthquake.

== Education ==
Dirk Wagener was born in Kassel, Germany. He earned a bachelor's degree in agronomy and a master's degree in International Agricultural Sciences from Humboldt University of Berlin, Germany. He also completed an exchange semester at Wageningen University in the Netherlands, where he studied agricultural knowledge systems. In addition, he pursued studies in ethnology at the University of Cologne, with a focus on India.

Wagener completed his Abitur at Jacob-Grimm-Schule and received his Mittlere Reife from Heinrich-Schütz-Schule, both in Kassel.

== Career ==
Wagener joined the United Nations system in 2002, working with the United Nations Development Programme (UNDP) in Papua New Guinea until 2007 in various capacities. In 2008, he was appointed Assistant Resident Representative for UNDP in Laos, where he worked on governance and aid coordination until 2012. He subsequently served in Ethiopia as UNDP team leader for partnerships and management support until 2014.

From 2014 to 2019, Wagener worked with the United Nations Environment Programme (UNEP) in Nairobi, Kenya, as Coordinator of the Resource Efficiency Programme, focusing on sustainable consumption and production initiatives. In May 2019, he was appointed UNDP Resident Representative in Papua New Guinea, following United Nations reforms that separated the positions of Resident Representative and Resident Coordinator. He presented his credentials to Papua New Guinea’s Foreign Minister Rimbink Pato on 13 May 2019. He served in this role until 2023.

Between 2021 and 2022, Wagener also served as Interim United Nations Resident Coordinator in Papua New Guinea. During this period, he was involved in United Nations-supported processes related to the Bougainville peace negotiations between the Government of Papua New Guinea and the Autonomous Bougainville Government, including discussions following the 2019 independence referendum and the development of the Wabag Roadmap.

In June 2023, he assumed the position of United Nations Resident Coordinator in Fiji, overseeing UN operations across Fiji, Solomon Islands, Tonga, Tuvalu, and Vanuatu.
