= Shais Taub =

American Hasidic rabbi and author

Rabbi Shais Taub
- שת טויב
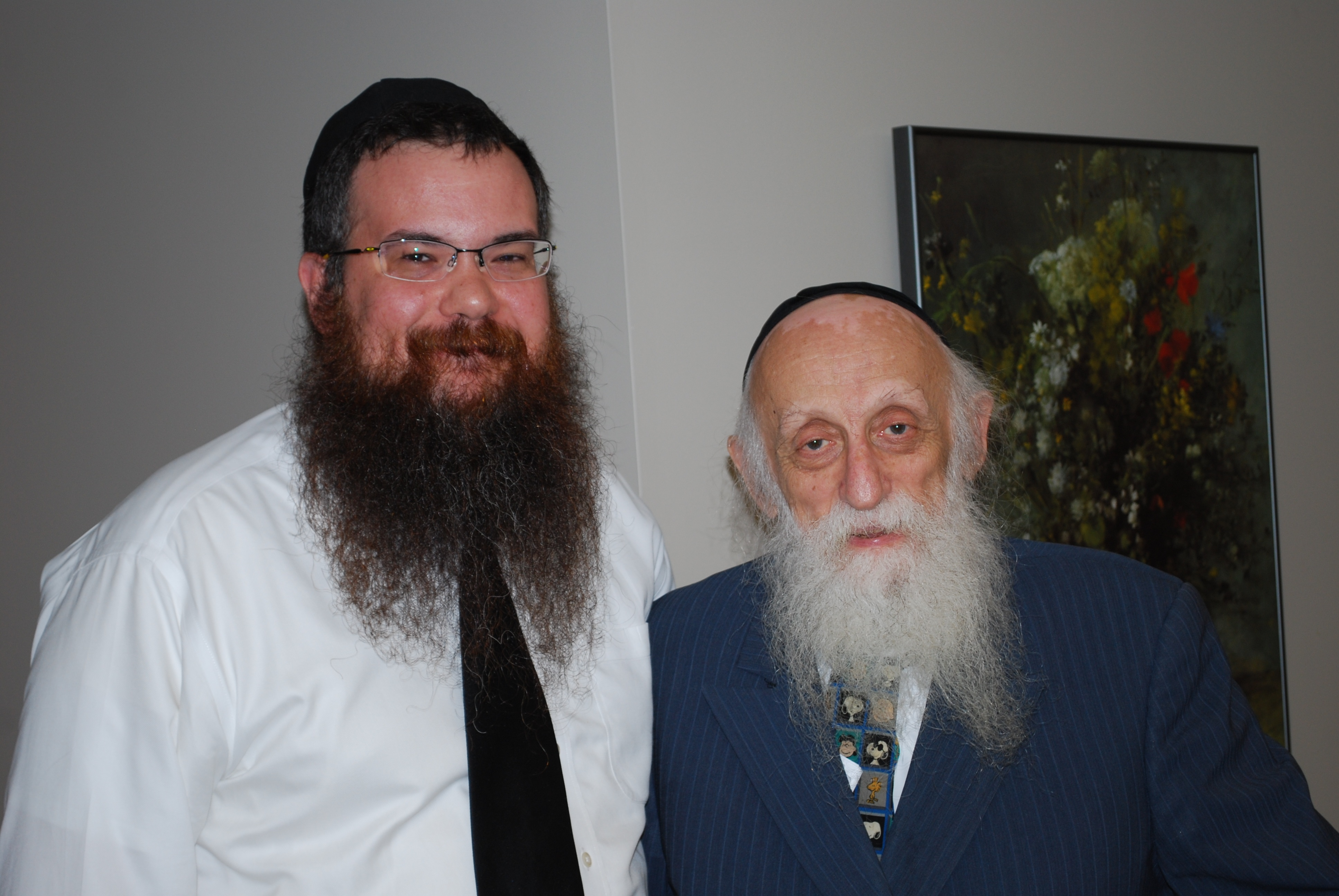
- Shais Taub (left) and Abraham J. Twerski in Pittsburgh, 2011
- Born: Chicago, Illinois
- Writing career
- Subjects: Addiction recovery Tanya
- Notable works: God of Our Understanding: Jewish Spirituality and Recovery from Addiction (2009)

Shais Taub is an American Hasidic rabbi and author. He writes about Jewish mysticism and is also known for his work in the field of addiction recovery. He is a weekly columnist for Ami Magazine.

== Early life and education ==
Taub grew up in a Jewish home in Chicago. His father, Gershom Taub, was a psychologist and his mother a speech pathologist. As a teen he grew closer to his Jewish roots and got directed to study in the Central Lubavitch Yeshiva in Crown Heights, Brooklyn and received his rabbinic ordination.

== Career ==
Taub credits his father's work as influential in his decision to a pursue a career in addiction therapy. He entered this field without any prior training, first leading a recovery group for Jewish men at the Chabad House in Milwaukee in 2006. Afterwards he undertook his own research in the field and wrote his first book, God of Our Understanding: Jewish Spirituality and Recovery from Addiction, in 2009.

In his 2009 book, Taub asserts that ancient Jewish principles relate to 12-step treatment programs. Publishers Weekly called the book "a thoughtful counter to one criticism occasionally heard—that the 12 steps are implicitly Christian - and a singular and valuable resource for those in need." Taub posits that drugs are the addict's solution rather than his problem, and that those people who turn to chemicals or other compulsive behaviors such as overeating or gambling are attempting to fill a spiritual void.

He has compared his work to that of Abraham J. Twerski, another Hasidic rabbi who has written extensively on addiction and who is also a Milwaukee transplant to Pittsburgh. Twerski endorsed God of Our Understanding, stating that the book "should be read by all clergy, therapists, people in recovery, people who should be in recovery, and their family members".

=== Influence beyond the Jewish world ===
Following a February 2012 visit to the iconic Boys Town orphanage in Nebraska where Taub trained clinical staff on addiction treatment, The New York Times wrote about Taub's influence beyond the Jewish world, noting that "in saying overtly what the recovery movement often leaves deliberately ambiguous... Rabbi Taub has become a phenomenon. Even as he is anchored within the Hasidic world, he has transcended it, first by reaching unaffiliated and secular Jews and then, most unexpectedly, by finding an eager audience among Christians." In that same article, Taub clarified his approach to teaching non-Jewish groups by saying, "It's not about interfaith ... I'm a Jew who's been able to study my tradition, and I have information, and I can be helpful to the extent I can share the information."

== Other activities ==
Taub is an exponent of the foundational Hasidic spiritual text, Tanya, for which he composed Map of Tanya for Kehot Publication Society, as well as the curriculum for a survey course on Tanya for the Jewish Learning Institute.

He and former NFL lineman Alan Veingrad, who became a Chabad-Lubavitch adherent after his retirement, hosted a "kosher tailgate party" at Lambeau Field during the 2007 season.

Taub has written an advice column in Ami Magazine, called "Ask Rabbi Shais Taub", since 2013, where he gives guidance based on Torah values. He published a collection of over 70 of the letters in a 2019 book, The Ami Letters, as well as a second volume published in 2020.

== Personal ==
Taub and his wife, Brocha, have seven children. They lived in Pittsburgh, Pennsylvania until September 2017, after which they moved to Cedarhurst, New York where he serves as scholar-in-residence at Chabad of the Five Towns.

== Bibliography ==
- God of Our Understanding: Jewish Spirituality and Recovery from Addiction (KTAV, 2010)
- Map of Tanya: Personal Edition (Merkos L'Inyonei Chinuch, 2008)
- The Ami Letters (Jewish Learning Group, 2019)
- The Ami Letters 2 (Jewish Learning Group, 2020)
