= Arts Education Policy Review =

- Discipline: Arts education
- Language: English
- Edited by: Colleen Conway

Publication details
- Former name(s): Design, Design For Arts in Education
- History: 1899-present
- Publisher: Routledge (United States)
- Frequency: Quarterly

Standard abbreviations
- ISO 4: Arts Educ. Policy Rev.

Indexing
- ISSN: 1063-2913 (print); 1940-4395 (web)
- LCCN: 93644308
- OCLC no.: 807239055

Links
- Journal homepage; Online access; Online archive

The Arts Education Policy Review is a quarterly peer-reviewed academic journal of arts education. It covers research on PK–12 arts education policy. It is published by Routledge and the editor-in-chief is Colleen Conway (University of Michigan). It was established in 1899 as Design and renamed Design For Arts in Education in 1977, before obtaining its current name in 1992.

== Abstracting and indexing ==
The journal is abstracted and indexed in:

- EBSCO databases
- MLA International Bibliography
- Répertoire International de Littérature Musicale
- TOC Premier
- Education Resources Information Center
- Expanded Academic ASAP
- InfoTrac
- ProQuest databases
