= Anet Bleich =

Dutch journalist

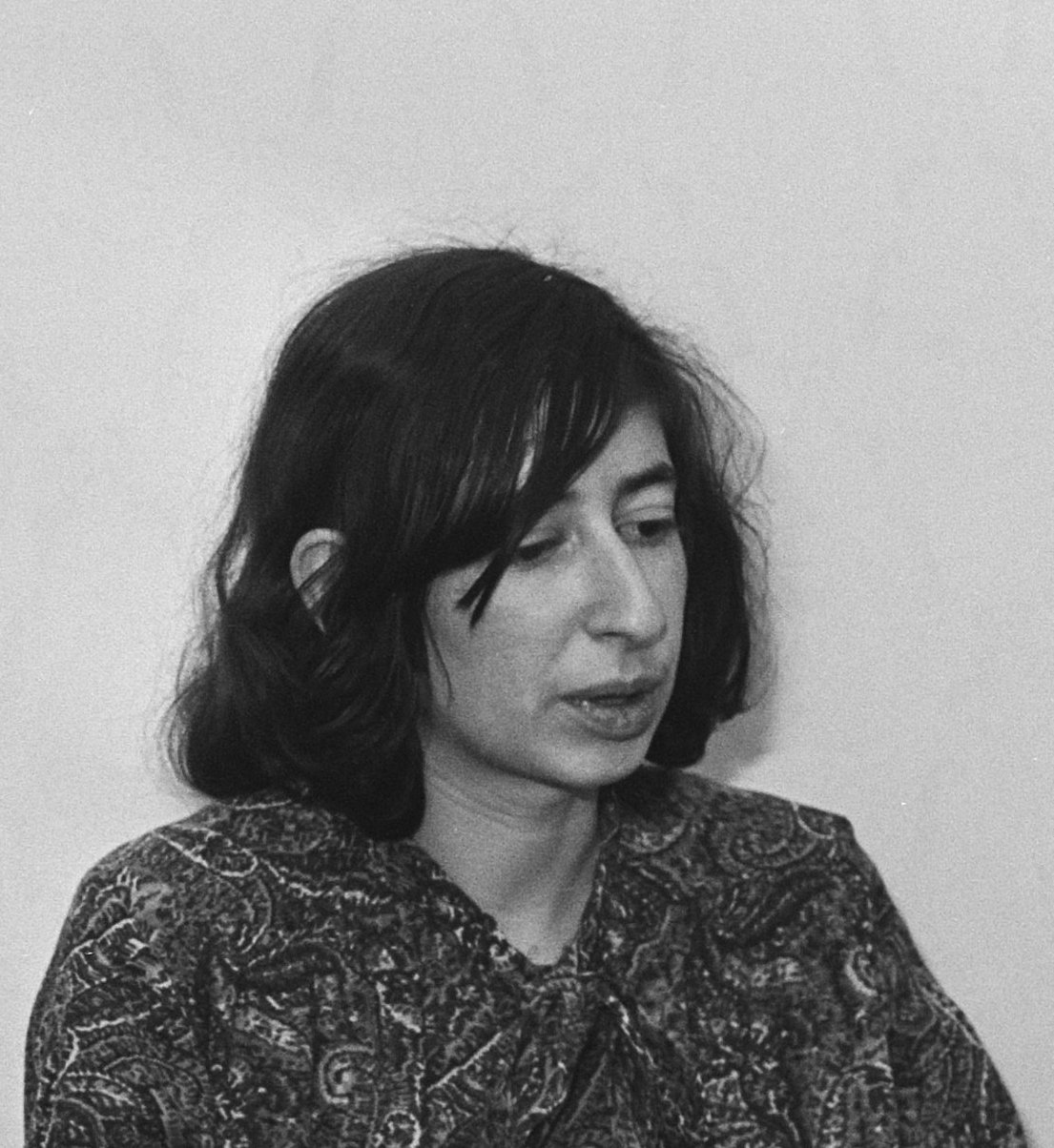
1979

Anet Bleich (born 2 September 1951) is a Dutch journalist, political commentator, author, columnist and writer.

== Biography ==
Ada Netty "Anet" Bleich's father was the journalist Herman Bleich (1917–1995), a refugee originally from Bochnia whose family had fled to Germany and then, after 1933, escaped to The Hague where, by this time, his sister Rosa was living, and which is where Anet Bleich was born in 1951 and grew up. During the postwar years Herman Bleich spent seven years as chairman Foreign Press Association in the Netherlands. For fifty years he was the Netherlands correspondent for mainstream national newspapers in Germany, Switzerland and Israel.

Many years later Anet Bleich confided to a student-interviewer that when she was ten she had dreamed of growing up to become a "professional revolutionary, like Rosa Luxemburg". Subsequently, she attended the Gymnasium Haganum where she was at one stage "editor in chief" of the school magazine, Spectemur Agendo.

She studied political science at the older University of Amsterdam. During 1969 and 1970, while still a student, she was a member of the Working Youth Group which had emerged through then university's left-wing student movements of the later 1960s. Another member of the group was her contemporary, Max van Weezel, who has also become a political journalist. The two of them have subsequently then married. Their daughter, born in 1986 has followed her parents into journalism.

In 1972, like several of her university contemporaries Anet Bleich joined the Communist Party, remaining a member until approximately 1975. During the 1980s and 1990s, as Cold War tensions began to ease a little, her left-wing political convictions were seen to have become more nuanced.

Invited in 1997 to compare Nazism and Communism, she accepted the validity of the question, "but what I do not appreciate is the painful party-game that asks which is the worse of the two". She insists on the need to differentiate between different forms and phases of communism, asserting that communism ceases to be viable if you democratise it. At the end, the only way to reform communism was to abolish it.

Bleich spent ten years as an editor with De Groene Amsterdammer, a long-established left-leaning weekly news magazine produced in Amsterdam. She later said that her journalistic identity had been largely formed by that experience. In 1989 she joined de Volkskrant (a daily national newspaper) as a columnist.

Much of her work reflects her long-standing involvement in left-wing intellectualism and feminism. Her writing is also informed by her Jewish provenance. She contributes articles to publications produced by the Anne Frank Foundation. She has contributed to the "Auschwitz Bulletin" of the Netherlands Auschwitz Committee (NAC). Her work reflects a powerful commitment to the Dutch antifascist movement. One example among many is an article she co-wrote with Rudi Boon in the book Nederlands racisme (1984). She also addressed the topic directly in the book Oud en nieuw fascisme from the Anne Frank Foundation.

On 21 February 2008 Bleich received a doctorate for her biographical study of the political leader Joop den Uyl: it was published under the title "Joop den Uyl 1919-1987. Dromer en doordouwer" (loosely "... dreamer and persister"). The work was supervised by Piet de Rooy and can be seen as the first biography of Den Uyl based on archive material and interviews with individuals involved. It makes extensive use of personal papers not previously released to researchers. It also featured on the front pages of mainstream newspapers in the Netherlands because of disclosures in it concerning the covering-up by Den Uyl of Prince Bernhard's involvement in the so-called Northrop affair back in 1976.
