= J. David Bleich =

American rabbi

Rabbi Judah David Bleich

Rosh Yeshiva, Rabbi Isaac Elchanan Theological Seminary

Personal details
- Born: August 24, 1936 (age 90) Tarrytown, New York
- Spouse: Dr. Judith Bleich
- Education: Brooklyn College, Columbia University, New York University, Yeshiva Torah Vodaath
- Occupation: Rabbi, Professor
- Known for: Contemporary Halakhic Problems, Bioethical Dilemmas: A Jewish Perspective, Jewish Bioethics

Judah David Bleich (born August 24, 1936) is an American Haredi rabbi and professor known for his expertise in Jewish law, ethics, and bioethics. He serves as a professor of Talmud (rosh yeshiva) at the Rabbi Isaac Elchanan Theological Seminary and heads its postgraduate institute for the study of Talmudic jurisprudence and family law. At Yeshiva University, he holds the Herbert and Florence Tenzer Chair in Jewish Law and Ethics. Bleich also teaches at Cardozo Law School and has been involved in governmental deliberations on bioethics.

Judah David Bleich was born in Tarrytown, New York. He received his education from Brooklyn College, Columbia University, and New York University. He holds rabbinic ordination from Yeshiva Torah Vodaas.

== Early life and education ==
Judah David Bleich was born in Tarrytown, New York). Bleich is the older of two sons of Rabbi Manning H. Bleich and his wife Beatrice. He attended public elementary school and received private tutoring on Jewish subjects. Later, he studied in Yeshiva Torah Vodaath and Beis Medrash Elyon, under Rabbi Elya Chazan. From 1958–1962, he attended the Kollel in Yeshiva Chofetz Chaim of Radun. He received a bachelor's degree from Brooklyn College in 1960, a master's degree from Columbia University in 1968, and a PhD from New York University in 1974.

Bleich is a Woodrow Wilson Fellow, a postdoctoral fellow at the Hastings Center, and fellow of the Academy of Jewish Philosophy. He received rabbinic ordination from Yeshiva Torah Vodaath, and advanced ordination ("Yadin Yadin") from Rabbis Moshe Feinstein and Mendel Zaks.

Bleich was a close student of Rabbi Yaakov Kamenetsky.

He is an authority on Jewish law and ethics, including Jewish medical ethics. He is a professor of Talmud (rosh yeshiva) at the Rabbi Isaac Elchanan Theological Seminary, an affiliate of Yeshiva University, as well as head of its postgraduate institute for the study of Talmudic jurisprudence and family law. At Yeshiva University, he holds the Herbert and Florence Tenzer Chair in Jewish Law and Ethics. He also teaches at Cardozo Law School. In 1961 he married to Dr. Judith Bleich, a historian of 19th-century European Jewry.

== Publications ==
Bleich is the author of Contemporary Halakhic Problems (eight volumes); Bioethical Dilemmas: A Jewish Perspective (two volumes); Jewish Bioethics (a collection of essays, which he co-edited with Fred Rosner); With Perfect Faith: Foundations of Jewish Belief; Time of Death in Jewish Law; Judaism and Healing; The Philosophical Quest: Of Philosophy, Ethics, Law and Halakhah; and DNA in Halakhah. He has written a book about the blessing on observing the sun return to the original position it occupied at creation (Bircas Hachamah, updated in 2009: ISBN 978-0-89906-175-7). In Hebrew, he has published Be-Netivot ha-Halakhah (four volumes). His Ph.D. thesis is Providence in the late medieval Jewish philosophy (NYU, 1974). He has written extensively on the applications of Jewish law to contemporary social issues and on the interface of Jewish law and the American legal system. He serves as the long-standing contributor of the survey of halakhic literature for Tradition: A Journal of Orthodox Jewish Thought.

Bleich brings an Orthodox perspective to governmental deliberations on bioethics. For example, in 1988 he served on the NIH Human Fetal Tissue Transplantation Research Panel and testified before Congress on the Pain Relief Promotion Act. In 1984, New York Governor Mario Cuomo appointed Bleich to the Governor's Commission on Life and the Law.

== Yorkville Synagogue ==
Bleich has been the rabbi (Jewish spiritual leader) of the Yorkville Synagogue, located in Manhattan for over 55 years. He teaches Talmud classes on Shabbat. He also teaches Jewish halakhic or philosophical issues in a program every other Sabbath. The topic usually is related to the subject matter of the weekly Torah portion.
