= Shaindel Antelis =

- Born: Shaindel Antelis; 1989 (age 36–37); Brooklyn, New York
- Genres: Jewish rock, pop, folk, country
- Occupations: Singer, songwriter, actress
- Instruments: Vocals, guitar
- Years active: 2008–present
- Website: shaindelantelis.com

Shaindel Antelis (born 1989) is an American Orthodox Jewish singer-songwriter and actress. She has released four studio albums and has performed throughout the United States, Canada, Europe, and Israel.

== Early life ==
Shaindel Antelis was born in Brooklyn, New York. Her father, Moshe, was a guitarist and songwriter before becoming a baal teshuva, while her mother, Nesha, teaches Zumba classes. Antelis comes from a family of musicians; in addition to her father, her brother Ben is a songwriter, producer and manager who has worked with Ricky Martin, David Archuleta, Dixie D'Amelio, Tori Kelly, Leah Kate, MILCK, Brianna Mazzola and many more. Another brother, Jake, is a drummer and producer. All three have worked on her albums.

She sang and wrote poetry from a young age and wrote her first song when she was ten. The family moved from Brooklyn to Elizabeth, New Jersey when she was 12, enrolling her in Bruriah High School for Girls. She later recalled that, despite an overall pleasant experience, she felt isolated in the new town and used her songwriting to cope with her tumultuous emotions.

After high school, she spent a year in Israel studying at Be'er Miriam seminary in Israel while taking night classes in cosmetology. She returned for a second year after her first album was released, during which she attended Neve Yerushalayim.

== Career ==
Upon returning from her first year in Israel, she released her debut album Heart & Soul (2009), for which her father provided bass guitar and arrangements while her brother Jake produced and played drums.

During her second year, she sought out open mic nights throughout Jerusalem. She competed in the all-female Wanna Be a Star Competition hosted by the Professional Women's Theater company, and was one of the eleven contestants invited to perform at a 2009 Spotlight event at the Gerard Behar Center. Returning home, she recorded her second album, Change (2010), which again featured her father and brother Jake with the addition of brother Ben on drums. A music video was filmed for the title track and released the following year.

In 2013, she released her third album, Live Today. Later that year, she appeared at the Lamplighters Yeshivah's annual In the Glow event for women, performing alongside Miriam Leah Droz and Bulletproof Stockings. In 2014, she released the music video "Invisible", which promoted an anti-bullying message.

== Artistry ==
Antelis plays Jewish music with elements of pop, rock, folk, and country, describing her sound as "not Borough Park but also not Taylor Swift.” Unlike most Jewish singers, she sings primarily in English, saying "I want to write and sing about my real life, so I write in my native language, so that everyone can understand. I try to be positive, and convey the message that G‑d is really there and always listening. My music is for all women, Jewish or not, whoever and wherever they are."

She is noted as one of the few active Orthodox female musicians, as many are inhibited by the rabbinic prohibition of kol isha. Early on in her career, she experienced difficulty getting Judaica stores to sell her albums, as women-only music was not seen as profitable. She was encouraged and mentored by Miriam Leah Droz, a fellow Jewish singer and founder of the Arts and Torah Association for Religious Artists (ATARA). Antelis has stated that she hopes to inspire other female musicians in the religious Jewish community.

== Discography ==
=== Albums ===
Year	Title
2008	Heart & Soul
2010	Change
2013	Live Today
2018	The Sun Is Rising

=== Singles ===
Year	Title
2011	"Mysterious Way"
2015	"By Your Side"
2015	"Light Up the World"
2020	"Full Color" (ft. Nechama Cohen)
2021	"Am Yisrael Chai"
2021	"Hashem Melech" (Gad Elbaz cover)
2021	"Thank You"

=== Music videos ===
Year	Song	Director
2011	"Change"	Leah Gottfried
2012	"The Light"	Leah Gottfried
2013	"The Palace"	Leah Gottfried
2014	"Invisible"	Leah Gottfried
2015	"By Your Side"	Leah Gottfried

=== Soundtracks ===
- The Heart that Sings (2011) ("Friends, Friends, Friends"; "Kaddish Ballet")

== Filmography ==
Year	Title	Role
2011	The Heart that Sings	Deenie Stein
2014	Changed	Cameo
