= Soon By You =

- Genre: Sitcom, romantic comedy
- Created by: Leah Gottfried
- Written by: Leah Gottfried; Danny Hoffman; Uri Westrich
- Directed by: Leah Gottfried
- Starring: Danny Hoffman; Sara Scur; Nathan Shapiro; Leah Gottfried; Noam Harary; Jessica Schechter
- Composer: Aaron Symonds
- Country of origin: United States
- Original language: English
- No. of seasons: 2
- No. of episodes: 8

Production
- Producers: Leah Gottfried; Jessica Schechter; Danny Hoffman
- Cinematography: Ryan Halasz; Jarrod Hurwitz; Greg Starr
- Editor: Atara Wolf
- Running time: 15-35 minutes
- Production companies: Dignity Entertainment; Shabbat.com

Original release
- Release: May 4, 2016 – November 22, 2021

Soon By You is an American comedy webseries created by Leah Gottfried. The series follows six young Modern Orthodox Jewish singles living in New York City as they navigate the shidduch system and complicated feelings for each other. The title is a common phrase used in the Orthodox world to wish luck to singles who have not yet found a match.

Conceived as a cross between American sitcom Friends and the Israeli drama series Srugim, the show was created by Gottfried, who also plays Sarah Jacobs, with the help of co-producers Danny Hoffman and Jessica Shechter (who star as David and Noa respectively). The pilot was screened as a short film at the Washington Jewish Film Festival, where it won Best Short, and the first season received over a million views on YouTube.

== Premise ==
The show follows a group of young Modern Orthodox singles living in New York City. In the pilot, David (Danny Hoffman), a young rabbinical student, arrives late to a restaurant shidduch date with aspiring artist Sarah Feldman (Sara Scur). The two hit it off, only to discover that there's been a mix-up: David was supposed to meet Sarah Jacobs (Leah Gottfried), while Sarah Feldman was supposed to meet legal intern Ben (Nathan Shapiro). After both dates go poorly and David loses Sarah Feldman's phone number, he enlists the help of his roommate Z (Noam Harary) along with Sarah Jacobs and her roommate Noa (Jessica Schechter) to find and reconnect with Sarah Feldman.

== Cast ==
=== Main cast ===
- Danny Hoffman as David, a young rabbinical student and the series protagonist.
- Sara Scur as Sarah Feldman, an aspiring artist who dates Ben despite harboring feelings for David.
- Nathan Shapiro as Ben, an intern at a law firm who dates Sarah Feldman.
- Leah Gottfried as Sarah Jacobs, a vapid and superficial girl who briefly dates David before helping him to reconnect with Sarah Feldman. To avoid confusion between the two, the others nickname her "Jacobs", much to her annoyance.
- Noam Harary as Zalmi ("Z"), David's eccentric and clueless roommate. He is oblivious to technology and pop culture more recent than the 1990s, displayed by behavior such as renting VHS tapes from Blockbuster and listening to the Backstreet Boys and the Spice Girls, and is often unknowingly inappropriate in social situations, although he is consistently supportive and loyal to David.
- Jessica Schechter as Noa, Sarah Jacobs' streetwise and socially conscious friend and roommate.

== Production ==
Creator Leah Gottfried conceived of the series after watching the Israeli drama series Srugim, about a group of Orthodox Jewish singles in Jerusalem, and wanting to see a version of the show set in New York City. Drawing on their shared experiences dating as Orthodox singles in New York, Gottfried developed the series with fellow actor/writer/producers Danny Hoffman and Jessica Schechter, having met Hoffman while filming a Jewish parody sketch based on The Office and Schechter at an arts conference. Hoffman was cast in the lead role of David, with Gottfried intentionally conceiving of the character as a young rabbinical student to go against the typical media image of rabbis as "old, bearded kind of people". Schechter initially was not cast in the show but stayed on as a production assistant, and eventually Gottfried wrote the character of Noa for her. Sara Scur, who plays Sarah Feldman, is a Seventh-day Adventist who was drawn to the project because of the opportunity to immerse herself in a different world and because it would allow her to take the Sabbath off. The show partnered with the Jewish Entertainment Network of Los Angeles (JENLA) to help obtain investors and advertisers to provide funding and has incorporated product placements from sponsors like Shabbat.com, JSwipe, and Forj, as well as partnering with nonprofit organizations like the Organization for the Resolution of Agunot (ORA).

The show's pilot, "The Setup", was originally conceived as a short film and submitted it to several film festivals, including the Washington Jewish Film Festival where it won Best Short in March 2016. The pilot was uploaded to YouTube on May 5, 2016 and received more than 20,000 views in its first week, while the first season as a whole ultimately garnered roughly 1 million views. A second season premiered on July 10, 2019.

== Episodes ==
=== Season 1 (2016–17) ===
No.	Title	Running time (in minutes)	Original release date	Link
1	"The Setup"	15:57	May 4, 2016	Link
When David's train gets delayed he is forced to sprint through New York City to make it to his blind date on time. When he gets there however, he sits down across from the wrong Sarah. Or was she really the right one?
2	"The Follow Up"	29:45	July 7, 2016	Link
After losing Sarah F's number, David - with the help of his roommate, Z - is willing to do anything to find her.
3	"The Shabbat Meal"	31:16	October 20, 2016	Link
David goes to great lengths to see Sarah F again. Meanwhile Ben faces his first conflict between work and faith.
4	"The Dates"	32:50	May 25, 2017	Link
David and Sarah finally go on their first date. Jacobs explores foreign avenues for a love connection and Noa, Ben, and Z take up volunteering.
5	"The Wedding"	36:38	December 6, 2017	Link
David and Z crash a wedding with the intention of wooing Sarah, but don't get the reception they expect. Jacobs and Noa face the pressures of being single at a Jewish wedding firsthand. Meanwhile, Ben begins to process some unfamiliar feelings, and Sarah learns about a family member's relationship issues.

=== Season 2 (2019–21) ===
No. overall	No. in season	Title	Running time (in minutes)	Original release date	Link
6	1	"The Do Over"	33:29	July 10, 2019	Link
One month after the season 1 finale, Jacobs and Ben deal with whatever happened at that wedding. Meanwhile, Z has a new friend, who may be interested in something more. Noa meets a smooth-talking guy, and may need to spend more time with him than she expected. Sarah's new job makes her consider her life choices.
7	2	"The Double Date"	33:18	February 3, 2020	Link
It's a busy Sunday for the SBY gang. David and Sarah's day in the park gets tense when unexpected visitors tag along. Z and Kayla double-date with Noa and Jacob, but Z has ulterior motives. Meanwhile, Jacobs spends the day hunting down her new passion.
8	3	"The Squirrel"	30:43	November 22, 2021	Link
The gang goes on an outdoor adventure that takes an unexpected turn while Jacobs goes the extra mile to help a dater in need.
