= Judith Bleich =

American academic

- Born: Judith Ochs; 1938 (age 87–88)
- Education: New York University; Stern College
- Spouse: J. David Bleich (m. 1961)
- Scientific career
- Fields: Judaic studies
- Workplaces: Touro College

Judith Bleich née Ochs (born 1938) is a professor of Judaic studies at Touro College in Manhattan. She specializes in the nineteenth-century development of Reform and neo-Orthodoxy in the wake of the enlightenment and emancipation, and has written extensively on modern Jewish history. She is also a member of the steering committee for the Orthodox Forum organized by Yeshiva University.

== Biography ==
She was born Judith Ochs. In June 1961 she married Rabbi J. David Bleich. They have three children together.

== Academic credentials ==
Bleich earned her bachelor's degree and Bachelor of Religious Education from Stern College. She earned her master's degree from Yeshiva University. She earned her doctorate from New York University in 1974 with her dissertation Jacob Ettlinger, His Life and Works: The Emergence of Modern Orthodoxy in Germany.

== Selected bibliography ==
=== Articles ===
- "A symposium on divided and distinguished worlds". Tradition 26,2 (1992) 4-62
- "Between East and West: modernity and traditionalism in the writings of Rabbi Yehi’el Ya’akov Weinberg". Engaging Modernity (1997) 169-273
- "The Emergence of an Orthodox Press in Nineteenth-Century Germany". Jewish Social Studies 42 3/4 (1980), 323-344
- "Liturgical innovation and spirituality: Trends and trendiness". Jewish Spirituality and Divine Law (2005) 315-405
- "Rabbi Akiva Eger and the Nascent Reform Movement", in Proceedings of the World Congress of Jewish Studies 9.B3 (1986)
- "Rabbi Samson Raphael Hirsch: Ish al Ha’edah". Jewish Action 56.4: 28
- "Rabbinic responses to nonobservance in the modern era". Jewish Tradition and the Non-Traditional Jew (1992) 37-115
- "The Testament of a Halakhist". Tradition 20.3 (1982)

=== Books ===
- Bleich, Judith (1974). Jacob Ettlinger, his Life and Works: The Emergence of Modern Orthodoxy in Germany (PhD thesis). New York. OCLC 6739470.

=== Book chapters ===
- "The Circumcision Controversy in Classical Reform in Historical Context" in Turim: Studies in Jewish history and literature presented to Dr. Bernard Lander (Volume 1) (2007).
- "Greater Resources, Greater Accountability" in The Ethical Imperative: Torah perspectives on ethics and values (2000)
- "Military service: Ambivalence and contradiction" in War and Peace in the Jewish Tradition (2007), 415-476
