= Shabbat.com =

Online social network service aimed at the Jewish community

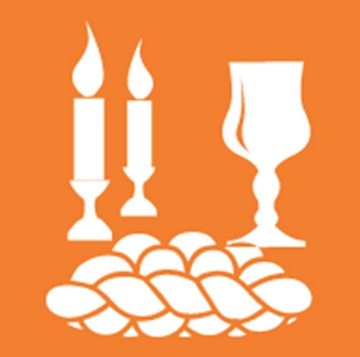

Shabbat.com is an online social network service aimed at the Jewish community. Shabbat.com connects users with "Hosts" for Shabbat as well as serving as an online dating platform and social network. Currently the site claims 100,000 members.

== History ==
The site and app was started in 2010 by Rabbi Benzion Klatzko as "SeeYouOnShabbos.com". The site was designed as a way for homesick college students to find traditional Jewish meals with families and Shabbat experiences as well as those who simply want to connect with their local Jewish community. The service changed its name to Shabbat.com in 2011.

== Description ==
Users of the website are divided into two categories, "Hosts" and "Guests". Guests utilize the website and app to find Hosts' homes where they may potentially eat and stay for Shabbat. Guests can find a host by searching the pages by country, state, city, neighborhood, proximity and occupation. There are other search fields as well which allow the user to find a host with whom they would feel comfortable spending Shabbat. They can then contact the family to make arrangements using the contact information provided. More than 5,000 guests find hosts weekly.

When creating an account, guests fill out a profile page for the host to acquaint themselves with their potential visitor. Two references are requested in order to provide a sense of security for hosts inviting "future friends" into their homes. Shabbat.com has facilitated more than half a million Shabbat arrangements worldwide.

The service also has a dating function, where users can set up profiles listing their interests and activities as well as Shidduch dating resumes. Volunteer matchmakers including partner members of the Rebbetzin's Organization refer singles to each other and set up matches. Dating profiles can be made private or public by the user, Shabbat.com averages six engagements a month through its Jewish matchmaking service.

In addition to Shabbat arrangements and dating, Shabbat.com serves as a social platform for connecting Jewish people through announcements, events, and online media.

Shabbat.com also contains a toolbox of extra features to enhance Jewish life, including worldwide candle lighting times, the exclusive Torah recordings on the parsha by Rabbi Juravel, a job search and listings.

== Awards ==
In 2014 Shabbat.com won Klatzko the "most inspiring rabbi of the year" award. The Shabbat app won the Ionic Showcase award in 2015.
