= Isaiah Rothstein =

American Orthodox Jewish rabbi

Isaiah Rothstein is an American Orthodox Jewish rabbi, author, musician and public speaker. He previously served as the Spiritual and Experiential Educator at Carmel Academy of Greenwich in Greenwich, Connecticut. Rothstein is best known for his essay "Color Erases, Color Paints" which generated extensive debate within the Jewish community about race and diversity.

== Rabbinic career ==
Rothstein received his rabbinic ordination from Yeshiva University. Rothstein, using Torah based resources, preaches about racial justice in both the Jewish community and in the United States at large. Rothstein previously served as a community gatherer at the Beis Community of Washington Heights. He served as rabbi-in-residence with Hazon, a Jewish environmental organization with 20,000 members, advocated for a faith-based response to climate change. According to the Swedish paper Svenska Yle, Rothstein represented Hazon to greet the international climate activist celebrity Greta Thunberg upon her arrival in the United States. Rothstein is an advocate of bible-based environmental conservation.

== Music career ==
Rothstein is also an accomplished musician and performs at functions throughout the Jewish and non-Jewish world. His music incorporates references from his childhood experiences and diverse musical traditions. He is the leader of the band Zayah.

== Personal life ==
Rothstein is originally from Monsey, New York, although his family has deep roots in the American past. His mother is an African-American convert to Judaism. Isaiah Rothstein's father was raised in a Jewish home in New York, but became Orthodox through Chabad. Rothstein is married to the actress and filmmaker Leah Gottfried, known for the successful webseries Soon By You.
