= Production Workshop =

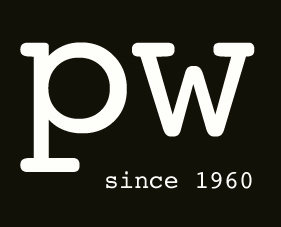
- Formation: 1960; 65 years ago
- Type: Theatre group

Production Workshop (PW) is a student-run theater at Brown University. Founded in 1960, it is the only entirely student-run theater on campus. PW stages 7 full-scale productions each year in its main black box theatre.

== History ==
In 1958, student and future avant-garde playwright Richard Foreman sought to organize a production of Brecht's The Caucasian Chalk Circle through the university's existing theatre organization, Sock and Buskin. Citing the play's ostensible association with communism, the dean of the college refused to approve the production. In response, Foreman resigned from Sock and Buskin and organized his own series of experimental "art events" in Faunce House. Production Workshop emerged from these events and was officially established as a theater group in 1959 and 1960.

The group staged its first play, Jean Giraudoux's L'Apollon de Marsac in January of 1960. A review of the play in The Pembroke Record described the production as an "experiment in low budget theatre." The 1966 yearbook described the organization as the campus's experimental theatre company, writing that it "presents the more progressive and avant-garde side of drama."

In winter 2006, the theater's production of Sartre's The Flies garnered media attention for its use of 40,000 live drosophila melanogaster. In 2013, the group again attracted national attention for "Nudity in the Upspace," a series of events which sought to "discuss and explore nudity in all forms."

Production Workshop controls two small black box theaters in T. F. Green Hall: the Upstairs Space and the Downstairs Space. The Upstairs Space serves as a venue for full-length plays, musicals, staged readings, performance art, art installations, poetry readings, workshops, and dance concerts, among other projects. In the Downstairs Space, PW's main theater, the group produces 3 plays in the fall semester and 4 plays in the spring semester. Downstairs Space shows usually have seating for 80-120 audience members.

== Productions ==
Each production in the Downstairs Space is given access to the space for four weeks, including a week of tech rehearsals and performances. The Downstairs Space is also used by Musical Forum in the third month of each semester for their musical.

Recent productions include Five Lesbians Eating a Quiche (2017), House of Virgina (2017), Melancholy Play: A Contemporary Farce (2017), Firefly in the Light (2019) In the Pink (2019), In the Next Room (2024).

== Notable PW Alumni ==
Notable alumni of Production Workshop include many of Brown's prominent graduates in film and theatre, including John Krasinski, Emma Watson, Laura Linney, Masi Oka, Marin Hinkle, Peter Jacobson, Kate Burton, and Tim Blake Nelson. Other alumni include novelist Donald Antrim, illustrator Brian Selznick, and poet Sarah Kay.

In a 2018 interview, political commentator and news anchor Chris Hayes described Production Workshop as "genuinely one of the most formative and important experiences in my life." Hayes stated, "It was probably the most important education I got in college, in terms of a practical sense for adult life. A huge amount of it was getting together with other people in a room to have a meeting to make a decision -- which basically is what all adult life ends up being."
