= Stern College for Women =

Jewish women's college in Manhattan, New York

Coordinates: 40.74661°N 73.97922°W

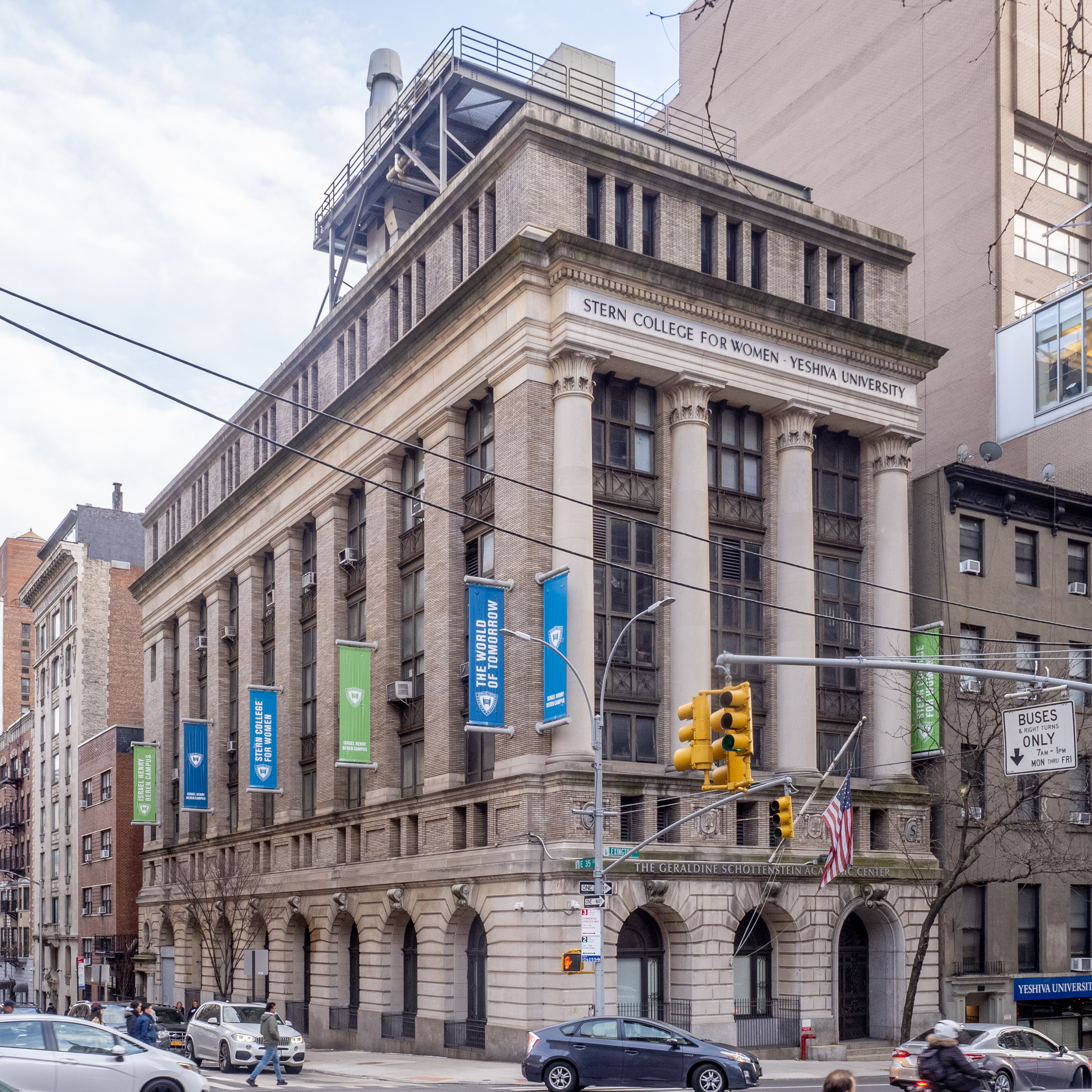
245 Lexington Avenue, known familiarly as "the Stern Building," is a campus hub, including a beit midrash (study hall), cafeteria, library, and science labs.

The Stern College for Women (SCW) is the undergraduate women's college of arts and sciences of Yeshiva University. It is located at the university's Israel Henry Beren Campus in the Murray Hill section of Manhattan.

The college provides programs in the sciences, social sciences, humanities, and Jewish studies, along with combined degree programs in dentistry, physical therapy, and engineering, among others. It grants the bachelor of arts degree, and also awards the Associate of Arts degree in Hebrew language, literature, and culture. SCW's dual undergraduate curriculum includes the Basic Jewish Studies Program, a one- to two-year introduction to Bible, Jewish law, and Hebrew that allows students without traditional yeshiva or day school backgrounds to be integrated into SCW's regular Jewish studies courses. The Rebecca Ivry Department of Jewish Studies offers courses ranging from elementary to advanced levels in Bible, Hebrew, Jewish history, Jewish philosophy, and Jewish laws and customs. The S. Daniel Abraham Honors Program stresses writing, critical analysis, cultural enrichment, individual mentoring, and the development of leadership skills.

SCW was established in 1954, based on a gift from the late industrialist Max Stern. Today it serves more than 2,000 students from approximately two dozen U.S. states and a similar number of nations, including students registered at Syms School of Business.

== History ==
SCW opened in September 1954 with an incoming class of 32 students. The school was named in honor of Emanuel and Caroline Stern, the parents of Max Stern, who was a major contributor to the building of the college. SCW was founded as a response to YU’s post-WWII goals within the Orthodox Jewish community, one of which was to expand the impact of Orthodox Judaism on the greater American Jewish community Between 1945–1954, YU also opened a medical school, and graduate schools for Jewish social work, education, and psychology, as well as a community service department. Enrollment in SCW quickly grew to 500 students as the school offered diverse programs, which met the educational needs of students from different religious backgrounds. In the early years, the majority of students’ career goal was to be a school teacher, thus making it easy to develop a curriculum.

Karen Bacon, a 1964 graduate of SCW who had earned a PhD in microbiology from UCLA and worked as an assistant professor of biology at UCLA, was appointed the dean of SCW in 1977. She was the first woman to hold the position. In 1977, shortly after Rabbi Norman Lamm was appointed the president of YU, the administration worked to develop a more intensive, text-based Jewish studies program for SCW, including creating a Beit Midrash (Jewish study hall). On October 11, 1977, Rabbi Joseph Dov Soloveitchik delivered the introductory shiur (lecture) to inaugurate the program. In 1980, SCW restructured its Jewish studies department to offer students the opportunity to study classical Jewish texts. In 1987, the Sy Syms School of Business (since renamed Syms School of Business) was established.

In 2001, the Graduate Program in Advanced Talmudic Studies (GPATS) was established. The program offers high-level Torah study, and graduates move on to serve as scholars in communities and schools in the United States and Israel. As of 2019, there are 977 students enrolled in SCW and 187 in the Syms School of Business.

== Building ==
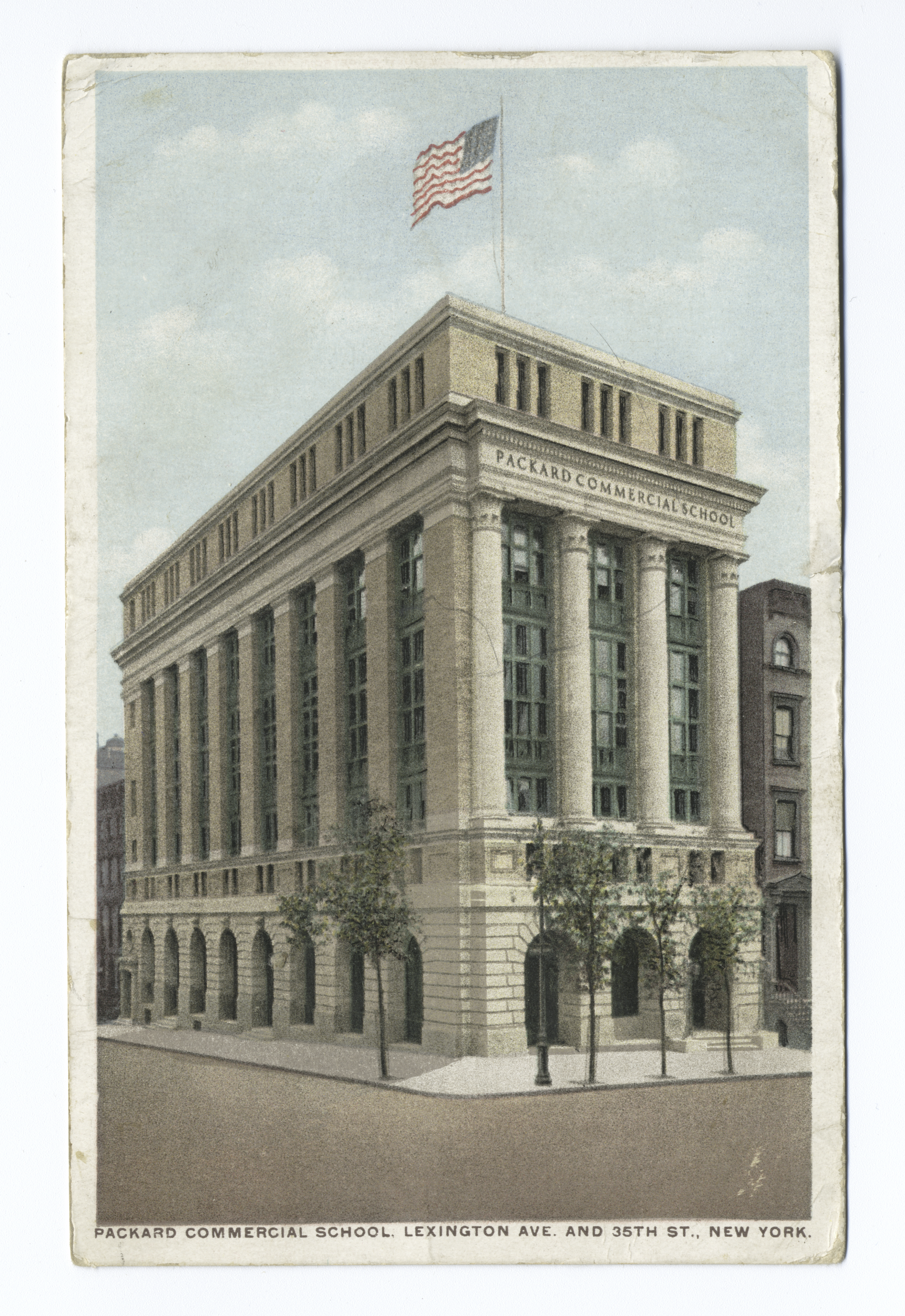
Packard Commercial School

The school's building at 253 Lexington Avenue at the corner of East 35th Street in the Murray Hill was built in 1911 for the Packard Commercial School – which later became Packard Business College and Packard Junior College – at the cost of $250,000. In 1954 it was taken over by Yeshiva University for the inaugural class of the Stern College for Women.

== Notable alumni ==
- Judith Bleich (née Ochs; born 1938), professor of Judaic studies at Touro College
- Erica Brown, Vice Provost for Values and Leadership at Yeshiva University and founding director of its Rabbi Lord Jonathan Sacks-Herenstein Center for Values and Leadership
- Shayna Goldberg (born 1979), American–Israeli author, educator, and Yoetzet Halacha (halachic advisor)
- Leah Gottfried (born 1991), actress and filmmaker
- Amy Guterson (born 1967), actress, filmmaker, and educator
- Anna Kaplan (née Monahemi; born 1985), Iranian-born American, New York State Senator
- Gilah Kletenik, academic and Open Orthodox rabbi
- Rochelle Majer Krich (born 1947), writer of mystery novels and winner of an Anthony Award and the Mary Higgins Clark Award
- Faranak Margolese (born 1972), American-Israeli writer
- Atara Marmor (Betty-Anne-Atara Marmor, née Feuerwerker; 1943–2003), French historian and art collector
- Dina Najman (born1968), rabbi of the Kehilah of Riverdale
- Hindy Najman (born1967), academic specialising in Jewish studies and the Hebrew Bible; Oriel and Laing Professor of the Interpretation of Holy Scripture at the University of Oxford
- Lexa Roséan (born1958), writer, dancer, psychoanalyst, and Wiccan high priestess
- Yael Ziegler (born 1970), American–Israeli author, Tanakh scholar, and educator

== See also ==
- List of Jewish universities and colleges in the United States
