= T. L. Wagener =

American screenwriter

T.L. Wagener (Terri Wagener, T.W. Bristol) is a playwright, screenwriter, and novelist. Her plays include The Man Who Could See Through Time, The Tattler: The Story and Stories of a Pathological Liar, Currently Married, Ladies in Waiting, Semi-Precious Things, Damn Everything But The Circus, Work, and The Age of Outrage. Her film work includes Fried Green Tomatoes, and others. She is known in Hollywood as the writer whose work got Jessica Tandy to say "yes." Her novel, written as T.W. Bristol, is "DID YOU FIND EVERY THING YOU WERE LOOKING FOR?", published by Quixote Publishing, March 5, 2024.

She is a recipient of an NEA Playwriting Fellowship Grant and is cited in "Best New Plays, 1982-1983," the Reva Shiner National Full-Length Play Contest, and has twice been a finalist for the Susan Smith Blackburn Prize. Her plays have been produced at the O'Neill Playwrights Conference in Connecticut, Actors Theatre of Louisville, Yale Repertory Theatre, South Coast Repertory (with Linda Purl off-Broadway (with Bob Gunton directed by Carey Perloff), as well as at many smaller theaters in the United States and Canada. Wagener's two-person play "A Royal Affaire," about King Edward VIII and Wallis Simpson was performed as a Benefit Gala program for the Pasadena Playhouse by Sharon Stone and David Hyde Pierce.

Wagener has taught writing at New Dramatists in New York City, Bread Loaf Graduate School of English at Middlebury College in Vermont, the Department of Dramatic Writing at The Tisch School at NYU, to schoolchildren in Sydney, Australia, and as part of the Screen Actors Guild Summer Conservatory in Los Angeles.
