= Azrieli Graduate School of Jewish Education and Administration =

Graduate school

- Type: Private
- Established: 1945
- Parent institution: Yeshiva University
- Dean: Rona M. Novick
- Location: Manhattan, New York, USA; 40.850494°N 73.92943°W
- Campus: Urban (2 campuses)
- Website: www.yu.edu/azrieli/

The Azrieli Graduate School of Jewish Education and Administration is a graduate school part of Yeshiva University which specializes in Jewish education and was established in 1945 and named in 1983 for Montréal architect and philanthropist David J. Azrieli. Classes are held at Yeshiva University's Wilf Campus in Manhattan's Washington Heights neighborhood, and Israel Henry Beren Campus in Manhattan's Murray Hill neighborhood.

Azrieli's dean is Rona Milch Novick, Raine & Stanley Silverstein Chair in Professional Ethics and Values.

== Academics ==
The School is an international center for training Jewish educators for administrative, supervisory, communal, and academic leadership. It offers Master of Science in Jewish Education and a Doctor of Education degrees.

The Director of the Master's Program is Laya Salomon.

There are many master's degree programs options that allow students to select the best course of study for their educational needs:

- Traditional Part-time Program
- Accelerated Master's Program (1-year start to completion, full-time study)
- Summer Program
- Joint BA/MS program from Yeshiva/Stern College
- Legacy Heritage Teacher Training Fellowship
- GiveBack Fellowship

The Fanya Gottesfeld Heller Division of Doctoral Studies offers three concentrations of doctoral study: educational leadership, psychology of student support, and curriculum and instruction that lead to an EdD. It also offers the Specialist's Certificate in Administration and Supervision of Jewish Education

Moshe Krakowski is the Director of the Doctoral Program

Azrieli also sponsors leadership and enrichment programs for teachers and administrators with the goal of improving the quality of Jewish schools. In addition, it publishes a series of monographs on research, teaching, and scholarship in Jewish education and PRISM: An Interdisciplinary Journal for Holocaust Educators.

== Institute for University-School Partnership ==
The Institute for University-School Partnership, a division of the Azrieli Graduate School of Jewish Education and Administration, draws on the intellectual capital and research expertise of Yeshiva University and connects it strategically and proactively to teachers and leaders in the field of Jewish education.

The Institute offers extensive continuing education for teachers, administrators, lay leaders and other school-based professionals; recruits and places educators; conducts research and development projects in schools; publishes practical, research-based materials; and offers school affordability resources.
