= Arye Nehorai =

American electrical engineer and academic

Professor emeritus Arye Nehorai
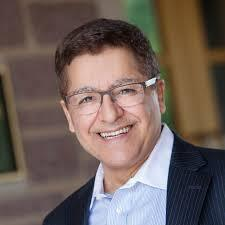
- Born: 10 September 1951 (age 75); Haifa, Israel
- Education: Technion (B.Sc., M.Sc.); Stanford University (Ph.D.)
- Awards: Fellow of the IEEE (1994); Fellow of the Royal Statistical Society (1996); AAAS Fellow (2012); Life Fellow of IEEE (2017)
- Scientific career
- Fields: Electrical engineering, signal processing
- Workplaces: Washington University in St. Louis
- Website: www.ese.wustl.edu/~nehorai

Arye Nehorai is an Israeli American electrical engineer and academic. He is the inaugural Eugene and Martha Lohman Emeritus Professor of Electrical Engineering at the McKelvey School of Engineering at Washington University in St. Louis.

== Early life ==
Nehorai was born in Haifa on 10 September 1951. His grandparents moved to Jerusalem from Iran in the 1920s. He grew up in Kiryat Bialik, Israel. He studied electronics in Haifa’s Bosmat technical high school, then managed by the Technion – Israel Institute of Technology. He graduated with B.Sc. degree in 1976 and M.Sc. in 1979, both in electrical engineering, from the Technion. He received his Ph.D. in electrical engineering from Stanford University in 1983. He worked at Systems Control Technology in Palo Alto, from 1983 to 1985, before joining academia.

== Career ==
Nehorai chaired the ESE department at Washington University in St. Louis from 2006 to 2016. He also served as Director of the Center for Sensor Signal and Information Processing and held courtesy appointments in the Division of Biology and Biomedical Sciences, Division of Biostatistics, Department of Biomedical Engineering, and Department of Computer Science and Engineering at Washington University. Before his tenure at Washington University, he held faculty positions at Yale University and the University of Illinois at Chicago.

During his tenure as chair, the ESE department underwent expansion in faculty recruitment, academic programs, and student enrollment. He also oversaw the department’s relocation to the newly constructed Preston M. Green Hall in 2011 and its naming in 2006.

He holds the title of the inaugural Eugene and Martha Lohman Emeritus Professor of Electrical Engineering in the Preston M. Green Department of Electrical and Systems Engineering (ESE) at Washington University in St. Louis. From 2006 to 2023, he was the inaugural Eugene and Martha Lohman Professor of Electrical Engineering.

His research interests are in statistical data analysis, signal processing and machine learning, for inference, prediction, decision making, and optimal design. Applications include health and bioengineering, defense (radar, sonar), energy and the environment. Nehorai was PI of multi-university grants funded by NSF, AFOSR, MURI, and DARPA, as well as other grants. He was the sole advisor of 38 Ph.D. students.

Nehorai served as the Editor-in-Chief of the IEEE Transactions on Signal Processing from 2000 to 2002. From 2003 to 2005, he was Vice President for Publications of the IEEE Signal Processing Society (SPS), chaired its Publications Board, and was member of its Executive Committee. He was the founding editor of the Leadership Reflections columns in IEEE Signal Processing Magazine from 2003 to 2006. He was also chair and co-founder of the Founding member and Chair, Technical Committee on Sensor Array and Multichannel Processing (SAM), IEEE SPS, from 2000 to 2002

== Honors ==
Nehorai received the IEEE Signal Processing Society Technical Achievement Award in 2006 and the IEEE SPS Meritorious Service Award in 2010. He received multiple best paper awards for his research, including the 2022 IEEE SPS Sustained Impact Paper Award. He was named a Distinguished Lecturer of the IEEE SPS from 2004 to 2005. In 2001, he was named University Scholar at the University of Illinois Chicago.

Nehorai is a Life Fellow of the IEEE since 2017, Fellow of the IEEE since 1994, Fellow of the Royal Statistical Society since 1996, Fellow of the American Association for the Advancement of Science (AAAS) since 2012 and the Asia-Pacific Artificial Intelligence Association (AAIA) Fellow) since 2021.

== Personal life ==
Nehorai is married to Shlomit Nehorai, a retired lecturer at Washington University in St. Louis. They have two children, Elad Nehorai and Sharone Nehorai, and three granddaughters.
