= Ori Murray =

American-born Israeli rapper (born 1983)

Ori Murray אורי מארי
- Also known as: Ori M'Ori
- Born: Rory Murray; Seattle, Washington
- Origin: Beit Shemesh, Israel
- Genres: Alternative hip hop, Jewish rock, Jewish hip hop
- Occupations: Rapper, songwriter
- Years active: 2002–present
- Website: shtarmusic.com

Rory Murray, known by his stage name Ori Murray (Hebrew: אורי מארי) is an American-born Israeli rapper, best known as the co-founder and rap vocalist of the band Shtar.

== Early life ==
Murray was born in Seattle, Washington to an Irish father and a Jewish mother, although he was raised with little connection to Judaism. His father, Rod Murray, was a high-ranking martial arts instructor with a school in Seattle. Ori himself actively trained and competed in karate and other disciplines from a young age, including several years as a collegiate wrestler. He was introduced to hip hop through albums like Jurassic 5's Quality Control and the Rawkus Records compilation Lyricist Lounge 2, and was further influenced by his high school poetry class.

As a teenager, he would often get into fights at house parties in Seattle's South End. One such fight left him so badly injured that he required metal plates in one leg and was unable to walk on it for a year. As part of his recovery, he worked with personal trainer and family friend Yaakov Lunen, an African American who had converted to Orthodox Judaism. Lunen's influence inspired Murray and his entire family to pursue a deeper relationship with Judaism. Murray began attending a weekly class at a local yeshivah; there, he encountered two rabbis from Aish HaTorah who persuaded him to come study at their yeshivah in Israel, where he ended up settling.

== Career ==
Murray began rapping professionally while living in Seattle. He recorded his first album at age 19 under the name Madsteez and performed at shows throughout the West Coast. He also performed as an MC and DJ in the city's house and drum and bass scenes.

At Aish HaTorah, Murray initially gave up rapping to focus on his studies, until one of his rabbis told him it would be a chillul Hashem to repress his talents in such a way.

=== Shtar ===
In 2006, Murray met fellow Aish HaTorah student Brad Rubinstein, who had previously been a guitarist in the short-lived English trip hop band Lisp. They began writing music together and formed Shtar, initially as a duo, before adding a full band to strengthen their live performance. They released their debut album, Infinity through Shemspeed in 2012, followed by their Boss EP, which featured Murray's fellow Seattle native D. Black on the song "Rabbit Hole". They competed on the 2015-16 season of the Israeli reality singing competition HaKokhav HaBa, coming in ninth place.

== Personal life ==
Murray currently lives in Beit Shemesh with his wife and children. In addition to his music career, he teaches kung fu and works in real estate. He has also written for The Times of Israel as a blogger.

== Discography ==
- Infinity (2011)
- Boss EP (2012)
