= Boss EP =

EP by Shtar
- Released: December 5, 2012
- Recorded: 2012 at Redstone Recording Studio, Beit Shemesh, Israel
- Genre: Jewish music, hip hop, rock
- Length: 16:09
- Label: Heatseat
- Producer: Brad Rubinstein, Adrian Bushby

Shtar chronology
Infinity (2010)	Boss EP (2012)	Beauty Queen EP (2013)

Boss EP is the debut EP by Jewish hip hop band Shtar, released on December 5, 2012. It follows the band's debut Infinity (2010), and is the first of two EPs meant to precede their second album. The EP was promoted with two singles, "Overload" and "Gone Again", both co-produced by Grammy-winning engineer Adrian Bushby. Jewish rapper Nissim (then D. Black) is featured on the song "Rabbit Hole", his first musical appearance since retiring in early 2011.

== Background ==
Boss EP was recorded at Redstone Recording Studio in Beit Shemesh, Israel with producer and band member Brad Rubinstein. Additional production and engineering on the singles "Overload" and "Gone Again" was done by two-time Grammy-winner Adrian Bushby (Foo Fighters, Muse), who had previously worked with Rubinstein's original band Lisp.

Rubinstein explained that "the majority of Infinity was recorded with just Ori and myself initially, and there was less live stuff going on. This is a little more 'band incorporated'. The band as it stands at the moment has been together for two years, so there's a lot more live stuff going on." Co-vocalist Dan Isaacs noted that his voice had gained "lots of flexibility" since recording the previous album.

The title track, "Here Comes the Boss", is a jungle\drum and bass-influenced song with lyrics inspired by a verse from Psalm 24. Lyrically, the album explores more universal themes than Infinity, including mortality ("Overload"), self-deception ("Rabbit Hole"), and Zionism ("Wonderland").

== Track listing ==
1. "Gone Again" – 2:51
2. "Rabbit Hole" (feat. D. Black) – 3:37
3. "Overload" – 3:22
4. "Wonderland" – 3:18
5. "Here Comes the Boss – 3:01

== Personnel ==
Shtar

- Ori Murray – rapping
- Brad Rubinstein – guitar, vocals, songwriting, production
- Dan "Zaki" Isaac – vocals, percussion
- Avi Sommers – bass guitar
- Tzvi Solomons – drums

Additional personnel

- Adrian Bushby – production/engineering ("Overload" and "Gone Again")
- D. Black – guest rapper ("Rabbit Hole")
