= Brad Rubinstein =

Israeli musical artist

Brad Rubinstein Binyamin Adam
- Born: Bradley Adam Rubinstein; Ilford, London, England
- Origin: Israel
- Genres: Alternative hip hop
- Occupations: Guitarist, songwriter, producer
- Instruments: Guitar, vocals
- Years active: 1995–present
- Labels: London, Shemspeed
- Website: shtarmusic.com

Bradley Adam Rubinstein (Hebrew name: Binyamin Adam) is an English-Israeli Orthodox Jewish guitarist, songwriter, and producer based in Israel. Initially gaining fame with the short-lived London trip hop band Lisp, he moved to Israel after becoming a baal teshuvah and co-founded the Jewish hip hop group Shtar.

== Career ==
=== Lisp ===
In 1995, Rubinstein, then living in East London, co-founded the trip hop band Lisp, together with vocalist Johnnie Gordon, bassist Jason Hall, drummer Adam Rich, and Disco Inferno's Paul Willmott on keyboards. Two years later, the band was signed to London Records' Mind Horizon imprint by Pete Tong. While with the label, the band released two singles, "Flatspin" and "Long Way to Climb" (the latter of which received airplay on XFM) and their debut album, Cycles, which released in 2000.

During this time, Rubinstein was encouraged by his father to start rediscovering his Jewish roots, ultimately leaving the group to avoid concerts that fell on the Jewish holidays. Lisp ultimately disbanded in 2001.

=== Shtar ===
Following his religious awakening, Rubinstein moved to Israel and began studying at the Aish HaTorah yeshiva in Jerusalem. There, he met rapper and fellow baal teshuvah Ori Murray, with whom he co-founded the Jewish hip hop group Shtar in 2006. They released their debut album, Infinity, in 2011; it was re-released the following year after the group signed to Shemspeed Records.

In December 2012, the group independently released the Boss EP, which he co-produced with Adrian Bushby and which featured a collaboration with Jewish rapper Nissim (then D. Black) on the song "Rabbit Hole".

== Discography ==
=== With Lisp ===
- Cycles (2000; London)

=== With Shtar ===
- Infinity (2010; re-released 2012; Shemspeed)
- Boss EP (2012; Heatseat)

=== Other ===
- Shtar, Boss EP (2012) - co-produced with Adrian Bushby
- Ari Goldwag, Am Echad (2013) - mixing, post-production
