= Ari Lesser =

Jewish Rapper

Ari Lesser ארי בנימן בן ראובן
- Also known as: Johnny Rappleseed
- Born: Ari Benjamin Lesser; Cleveland Heights, Ohio
- Genres: Jewish hip hop, reggae, spoken word
- Occupations: Rapper, singer, songwriter
- Years active: 2003–present
- Website: ari-lesser.com

Ari Benjamin Lesser is a Jewish American rapper, singer, songwriter, and spoken word artist. Known for his videos on Israel and Jewish Holidays, Lesser has released over a dozen albums, written hundreds of original songs on a wide range of subjects, composed raps about 200 different animals, and created accurate rhyming translations of Pirke Avot, Psalms, and other parts of the Siddur. He continues to perform and speak at events around the world.

== Biography ==
=== Early life ===
Lesser grew up in Cleveland Heights, Ohio. He is the son of Raymond Lesser and Susan Wolpert, who co-founded the humor publication Funny Times. His family is culturally Jewish, and he had a bar mitzvah at the Reconstructionist synagogue Kol HaLev.

Lesser started rapping at 17 while attending Cleveland Heights High School, and began pursuing music as a career soon after arriving at the University of Oregon in 2004. As a freshman, Lesser connected with a hip hop crew from the Oregon Coast known as "4 Trees", and together they formed a band that performed around Eugene throughout his college years. During this period Lesser's lyrics were quite political, and he would often rap at rallies and protests, promoting sustainability, calling for social justice, and speaking out strongly against the War in Iraq.

It was also around this time that he first began advocating for Israel. During college, Lesser was very liberal, and minimally observant, but still identified as Jewish, and strongly believed the Jewish State had a right to exist. As he became more involved with student activism, he was shocked by the intense anti-Israel sentiments prevalent on campus. In one incident, Lesser signed up for a course called "Israel/Palestine" and found it to be heavily biased, with the professor announcing that the class should just be renamed "Palestine". Other Jewish students immediately dropped out, but Lesser finished the semester, because he felt the class needed to have at least one Jewish voice, and ultimately graduated in 2008 with a bachelor's degree in political science.

=== Career ===
During his years at college, Lesser wrote over a hundred songs, and spent his summers traveling the west coast of the United States, performing at various music festivals. He sold thousands of CDs in the parking lots and campgrounds of these events, often wearing a sign inscribed with 31 of his original song titles, labeled "Ari's 31 Flavors". Lesser would approach groups of strangers, offering free songs which they could select from his menu. Eventually, word of his lyrical abilities made its way back to festival organizers, and Lesser was regularly hired as an MC, rapping and singing, between other acts, at High Sierra, Oregon Country Fair, and many other events. This allowed him to share the stage with more established artists including Slightly Stoopid, Ben Harper and Lauryn Hill.

After graduation, Lesser was contacted by Patrick Duff, a Rastafarian activist, and medical marijuana dispensary owner in Los Angeles, CA. Duff had purchased one of Lesser's CDs at a music festival earlier that year, and was struck by Lesser's lyrics. Duff offered to finance a professional studio album, and Lesser agreed to participate, moving from Eugene, OR to Los Angeles, CA in 2008 to work on the project. The album, titled "The Hippie" was produced by Grammy winning producer Paul Fakhourie, and featured a number of other artists including Bob Marley's drummer Carlton "Santa" Davis.

While recording the album, Lesser resided in Silver Lake at a medical marijuana dispensary known as Liberty Bell Temple. The building also served as a Rastafarian ministry, and there, he was exposed to the Book of Psalms. Lesser related to King David as a songwriter, and began creating rhyming translations of the Psalms, a project which he continues to this day. This work ultimately led him to a deeper interest in Torah and his Jewish roots, and Lesser gradually shifted his focus away from the music industry, towards study, meditation, and prayer.

Lesser returned to Cleveland a number of times between 2009 and 2011, recording several acoustic albums with his father, "Psalms of Ascents", "Father & Son", and "Acoustic Bluegrass". During these years, Lesser also began composing raps about animals, and has now written raps on over 200 different species.

In 2012, Lesser visited Israel for the first time on a Taglit-Birthright trip, and stayed in the country for nearly a year, studying Torah at Mayanot in Jerusalem, and Yeshiva Temimei Darech in Safed. Though learning full time, he continued writing songs throughout his stay in Israel, in July 2012, he recorded his entire spoken word album, "Three Weeks" in one session on the 17th of Tammuz. While in Safed, Lesser formed a band with his Rosh Yeshivah, Rabbi Shalom Pasternak, of Kabbalah Dream Orchestra. "

When Lesser returned to the states in late 2012, he became increasingly active on social media. Lesser was relatively unknown in the Jewish community before the release of his YouTube video, "Hanukkah Hip Hop" which garnered 40,000 views in a week. In early 2013, his video "Purim Poetry Slam" comparing Iranian president Mahmoud Ahmadinejad to Haman received 70,000 views in a matter of days.

In the summer of 2013, Lesser returned to Israel to perform at Safed Klezmer Festival. During the trip he collaborated with producer Jeremiah BenZion and recorded the album "Tzfat Reggae". In October 2013, he released his music video, "Boycott Israel". In the song, Lesser responds to the BDS movement, highlighting its double standard, and arguing that those who boycott Israel should also boycott 40 other countries engaged in human rights violations. Lesser used information from Amnesty International and Human Rights Watch to research the song. The video gained 140,000 views in the first two months, and now has nearly 500,000 views on Lesser's YouTube Channel. The song made international news in 2015 in a BBC article discussing the BDS movement.

The success of "Boycott Israel" drew the attention of Los Angeles-based advocacy organization StandWithUs who partnered with Lesser, in the summer of 2014, to create the video "Hamas" which has received over 200,000 views on YouTube. Lesser continues to be active on social media with over 7,000 subscribers on YouTube, and nearly 15,000 followers on facebook.

Due to his success on social media, Lesser has risen in popularity within the Jewish community, and especially among Orthodox Jews. In 2016, he appeared in a promotional video for the Jewish outreach organization Oorah entitled "Got Five Bucks?". Lesser also collaborates with many Jewish artists, and is featured on songs with Gad Elbaz, C Lanzbom, and Lipa Schmeltzer. He has spoken and performed at hundreds of events for Jewish communities around the world, and done shows with Moshav Band, Nissim Black, and Zusha.

== Personal life ==
Lesser has been a strict vegetarian since 2005, when he was exposed to footage from several slaughterhouses.

After beginning his work with Psalms in 2008, Lesser became increasingly observant, and now identifies as a baal teshuva. He took a Nazirite vow in 2009, and still considers himself a Nazir. He attended Chabad yeshivas during his time in Israel and is loosely affiliated with the movement, calling himself "Lubavitch".

In 2014, Lesser and his wife married in Cleveland, OH, eventually settling in Phoenix, Arizona, where their first son was born in 2015. The family moved again 2016, and Lesser currently resides in Beachwood, Ohio with his wife and their three sons.

== Discography ==
=== Albums ===
- 2010: Hip Hop Revolution
- 2010: Nerdcore
- 2011: Green Album
- 2011: The Hippie
- 2011: Father & Son
- 2011: Psalms
- 2011: One Love
- 2012: More Psalms
- 2012: Three Weeks
- 2013: Tzfat Reggae
- 2013: Acoustic Bluegrass
- 2013: Kabbalat Shabbat
- 2015: Animal Raps
- 2016: Psalms of Ascents

=== Singles and music videos ===
- 2012: "Hanukkah Hip Hop"
- 2013: "Purim Poetry Slam"
- 2013: "Passover Singles" ("Ten Plagues"/"Miriam")
- 2013: "Kosher Meat"
- 2013: "Shimon Bar Yochai" (Lag BaOmer single)
- 2013: "Sevens" (Shavuot single)
- 2013: "Sheyiboneh Beis Hamikdash" (Tisha B'Av single)
- 2013: "Jonah in the Whale" (Yom Kippur single)
- 2013: "Boycott Israel"
- 2013: "Give Thanks" (Hanukkah/Thanksgiving single)
- 2013: "Israel Apartheid"
- 2014: "Psalm 140"
- 2014: "Hamas"
- 2015: "Woman of Valor"
- 2015: "Where I Stand"
- 2015: "Life"
- 2015: "Maoz Tzur"
- 2016: "Peace" (ft. C Lanzbom)
- 2016: "Yehudit"
- 2017: "Martin Luther King Jr."
- 2020: "Malcolm X" (Juneteenth single)
- 2021: "Mordechai" (Purim single)

=== Guest appearances ===
- 2014: Gad Elbaz and Naftali Kalfa ft. Ari Lesser, "Miracles (Al Hanisim)"
- 2014: Lipa Schmeltzer ft. Ari Lesser, "The Reveal"
- 2015: Kosha Dillz ft. Ari Lesser, "Tubeshvat Hop"
