= The Cause & Effect =

The Cause and Effect

Studio album by D. Black
- Released: March 7, 2007
- Genre: Hip hop
- Length: 1:16:01
- Label: Sportn' Life
- Producer: Jake One, Bean One, Vitamin D

D. Black chronology
The Cause and Effect (2007)	Ali'yah (2009)

The Cause & Effect is the debut studio album by American rapper Nissim, then known as D. Black. It was released on March 7, 2007 by Sportn' Life Records.

Jake One, Bean One, & Vitamin D contributed to the production. Although the album did not get much attention outside of the Pacific Northwest scene, it sold over 4,500 copies regionally, and Black was invited to perform on the Vera Project stage at the 2007 Capitol Hill Block Party alongside Blue Scholars.

== Track listing ==
1. "Intro" - 0:18
2. "Black Again" - 3:56
3. "Like Me" (featuring Fatal Lucciano, Spac3man) - 4:29
4. "Get Loose" - 3:52
5. "Fuckin' with Me" - 4:08
6. "Get at Me" (featuring Zach Bruce) - 3:32
7. "About Mine" (featuring Mo Betta, A. Yes, Fatal Lucciano) - 4:30
8. "Survive" (featuring Choklate, Brainstorm, J. Pinder) - 4:28
9. "Pop a Bottle" (featuring Parker Brothaz) - 3:23
10. "The Story of Roger" - 2:10
11. "This Is Why" - 4:16
12. "Welcome to the Life" (featuring Dyme Def) - 4:15
13. "Secret Place" - 4:48
14. "In Case" - 3:21
15. "Crazy" - 4:05
16. "Jump" - 3:45
17. "Nobody" (featuring Choklate) - 4:10
18. "Lies for Love" - 4:31
19. "See My Death" - 4:43
20. Bonus track: "Swing" (featuring B. Brown) - 3:21
