= Ali'yah =

Studio album by D. Black
- Released: September 15, 2009
- Genre: Hip hop
- Length: 51:00
- Label: Sportn' Life
- Producer: D. Black; B. Brown; Vitamin D Jake One

D. Black chronology
The Cause and Effect (2007)	Ali'yah (2009)	NISSIM (2013)

Ali'yah is the second studio album by American rapper D. Black, released on September 15, 2009, through Sportn' Life Records. It was produced by Black, B. Brown, Vitamin D, and Jake One. The album was influenced by Black's Messianic Jewish faith at the time, displaying a more spiritual and socially conscious outlook than the gangsta rap stylings of his previous work. The album's title is a Hebrew word meaning "ascent"; the term "aliyah" is often used to refer to the immigration of Jews to the Land of Israel. This would be Black's last album before his temporary retirement; he would later return in 2012 as an Orthodox Jewish rapper under the name Nissim.

== Background ==
Following the release of his previous album, The Cause and Effect, Black, now a father, began studying religion and questioning his own faith (he had been raised a Sunni Muslim and converted to Christianity as a teenager), and later converted to Orthodox Judaism. Subsequently, his music began to take on a more spiritual and socially conscious feel influenced by artists like Common and Lauryn Hill, first evidenced in his song "God Like" that appeared on Jake One's 2008 album White Van Music.

The album was primarily produced by Jake One, Vitamin D, and B. Brown.

== Release and promotion ==
Ali'yah was released on September 15, 2009. The album spent five weeks at number 4 on CMJ's hip hop charts.

Six months after the album's release, Black fully renounced his belief in Jesus and Christianity. No longer supporting the album's message but unable to quit his contract, he agreed to promote it, but refused perform on Shabbat or to accept money outside of touring expenses. He subsequently retired to focus on converting to Orthodox Judaism, during which time he cut off all connections to his previous career, including abandoning his position at Sportn' Life and even getting rid of his own music collection.

== Reception ==
Professional ratings
Review scores
Source	Rating
PopMatters	6/10 stars
HipHopDX	3.5/5 stars

The album received mixed to positive reviews, with many critics praising his newfound lyrical maturity and the production work. Andrew Martin of PopMatters wrote, "Aside from the aforementioned stunning production, a strong cohesion exists in terms of subject matter and concept. D. Black sticks to the meaning of Ali’Yah closely. He and his production team will bring you right to the musical cloud nine now and then. It’s just a shame D. Black struggles to keep you there for a permanent residence." A staff review by HipHopDX stated that "D. Black may not be the best lyricist among his peers, but with a project like Ali’Yah, it’s evident that he’s not only shown progress with his lyrical content, but also as an individual."

== Track listing ==
No.	Title	Producer(s)	Length
1.	"Alter Call"	D. Black, Darrius Willrich	1:05
2.	"What I Do"	Vitamin D	2:53
3.	"Yesterday" (featuring Marissa)	D. Black, B. Brown	3:45
4.	"The Return"	Jake One	3:57
5.	"Keep On Going" (featuring Vitamin D)	Vitamin D	3:59
6.	"Blow the Trump"	Vitamin D	4:34
7.	"Let It Go"	B. Brown	3:46
8.	"Wake Up" (featuring Darrius Willrich)	Jake One	3:33
9.	"Yah Have Mercy"	Jake One	3:43
10.	"I Believe in You" (featuring Choklate and Spac3man)	Vitamin D	2:56
11.	"Sugar" (featuring Zach Bruce)	Kuddie Mak	4:15
12.	"Bring It Back" (featuring Grynch)	GMK	4:09
13.	"Close to Yah" (Fatal Lucciano)	B. Brown	5:56

Bonus track
No.	Title	Length
14.	"Touch the Stars" (featuring Tiffany Wilson)	3:21

Sample credits

- "Keep On Going" samples "London Girl", performed by 50 Cent and produced by DJ DB.

== Personnel ==
- D. Black – main artist, vocals, composer, engineer, producer ("Alter Call", "Yesterday"), executive producer, art direction, graphic design
- B. Brown – producer ("Yesterday", "Let It Go", "Close to Yah"), A&R, engineer
- Chris Torres – A&R, engineer
- Jake One – producer ("The Return", "Wake Up", "Yah Have Mercy")
- Vitamin D – producer ("What I Do", "Keep On Going", "Blow the Trump", "I Believe in You")
- Darrius Willrich – producer, vocals ("Alter Call", "Wake Up")
- Marissa – vocals ("What I Do", "Yesterday", "The Return", "Let It Go")
- Zach Bruce – vocals ("What I Do", "Yah Have Mercy", "Sugar")
- Randy Gary – vocals ("Keep On Going", "Close to Yah")
