= Nissim Black =

American Orthodox Jewish rapper

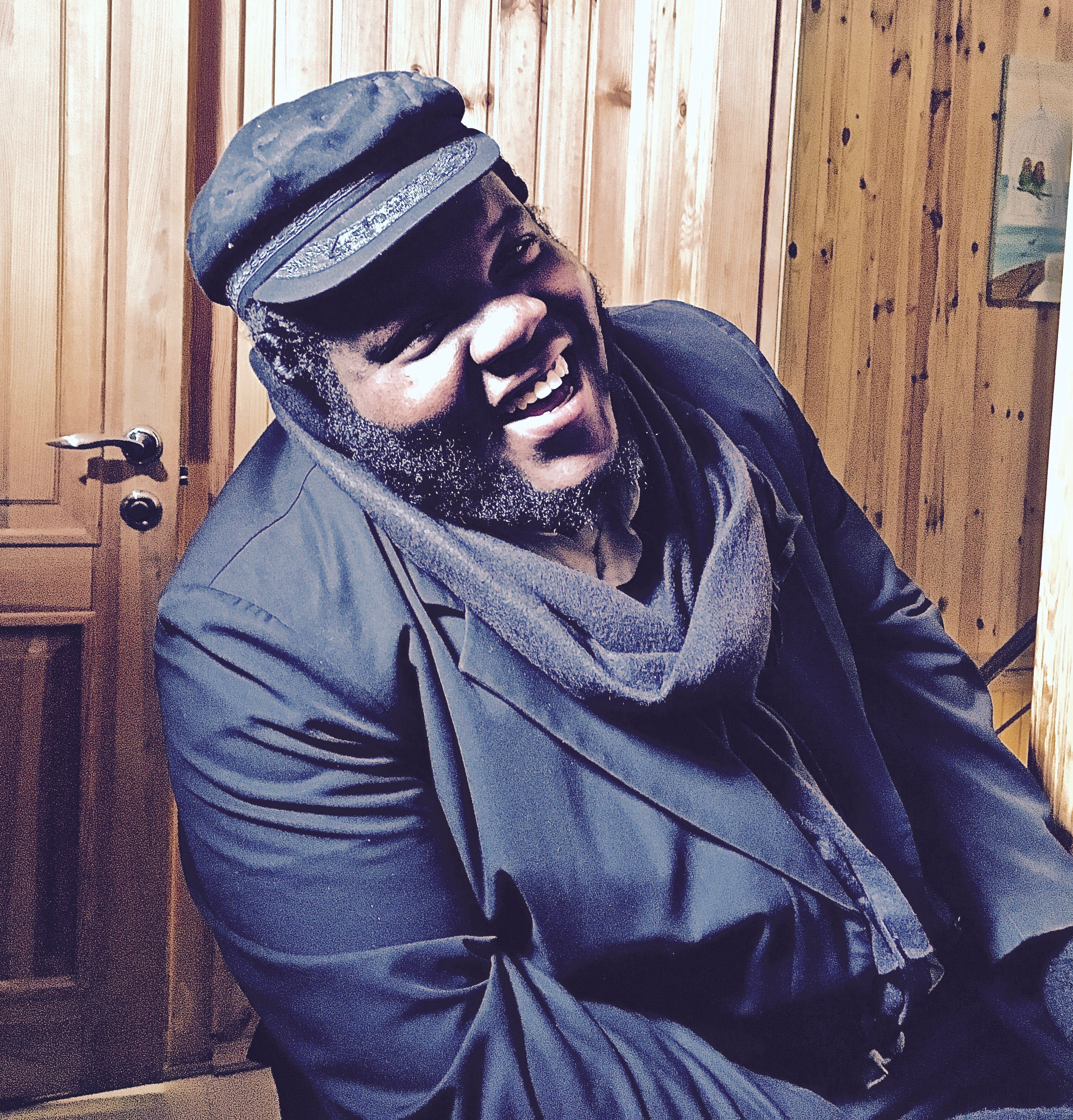
- Black in 2016

Background information
- Also known as: Nissim; Danger; D. Black
- Born: Damian Jamohl Black; December 9, 1986 (age 39); Seattle, Washington, U.S.
- Genres: Jewish hip hop; conscious hip hop; hardcore hip hop
- Occupations: Rapper; songwriter; record producer
- Instrument: Vocals
- Years active: 1999–present
- Labels: Sportn' Life; Fin; Nissim World
- Website: nissimofficial.com

Nissim Baruch Black (born Damian Jamohl Black; December 9, 1986) is an American-Israeli rapper, songwriter, record producer, and podcast host.

Under the stage name D. Black, he released the albums The Cause & Effect (2006) and Ali'yah (2009) and was featured on producer Jake One's debut album White Van Music (2008). He retired in 2011 to focus on his conversion to Orthodox Judaism, but soon returned under his new legal name Nissim Black (Note: "Nissim" is Hebrew for "Miracles".) and began focusing on Jewish hip hop. He appeared on Shtar's song "Rabbit Hole" (2012) and has since released the mixtapes Miracle Music (2013) and Love Notes (2020), as well as the studio albums Nissim (2013), Lemala (2017), Gibor (2019), and Glory (2024).

== Early life ==
Black was born Damian Jamohl Black in Seattle on December 9, 1986, the son of rappers Mia Black and James "Captain Crunch" Croone, members of the pioneering Seattle hip hop groups the Emerald Street Boys and Emerald Street Girls. His grandparents had also been musicians, playing alongside Ray Charles and Quincy Jones. He grew up in Seattle's Seward Park neighborhood, which also had a significant Jewish community, and Black was raised in his grandfather's Sunni Islam faith, but was non-practicing and converted to Christianity at age 14 after attending an evangelical summer camp. Prior to this conversion, he had been a member of the Gangster Disciples gang, which he would later reference on the song "Mothaland Bounce". His parents divorced when he was two years old, and his mother took him with her and remarried shortly thereafter. Both his biological parents and stepfather used and sold drugs from home, prompting the FBI to raid the house in 1995, leading to his mother's arrest; she later died from an overdose at the age of 37.

== Career ==
=== First Sportn' Life recordings: Behind the Dirt and The Cause & Effect (2002–2007) ===
Black began rapping in his preteens, recording under the name Danger. When he was 13, producer Vitamin D moved his studio into Black's stepfather's basement and began mentoring the boy, producing some of his first official recordings. Black also recorded with producer Bean One of Dyme Def.

In 2002, Sportn' Life Records published its first release, a split vinyl single between Black and the group Last Men Standing. The following year, Black appeared on a Sportn' Life compilation album, alongside several members of Oldominion. In 2004, the 18-year-old Black was selected by his stepfather to replace him as co-CEO of Sportn' Life, together with his father's partner, DeVon Manier. In addition to running the label, Black began releasing singles like "You Need a Thug" and "This Is Why" (the latter produced by Jake One, whom he had associated with early on). On May 24, 2005, Black released his first Sportn' Life mixtape Behind the Dirt, which featured appearances from J Smooth and Darrius Willrich of Maktub.

In 2007, he released his debut album, The Cause & Effect. Jake One, Bean One, and Vitamin D contributed to the production, though the album did not get much attention outside of the Pacific Northwest scene. Despite this, the album sold over 4,500 copies regionally, and Black was invited to perform on the Vera Project stage at the 2007 Capitol Hill Block Party alongside Blue Scholars.

=== Ali'yah, retirement, and conversion to Orthodox Judaism (2008–2011) ===
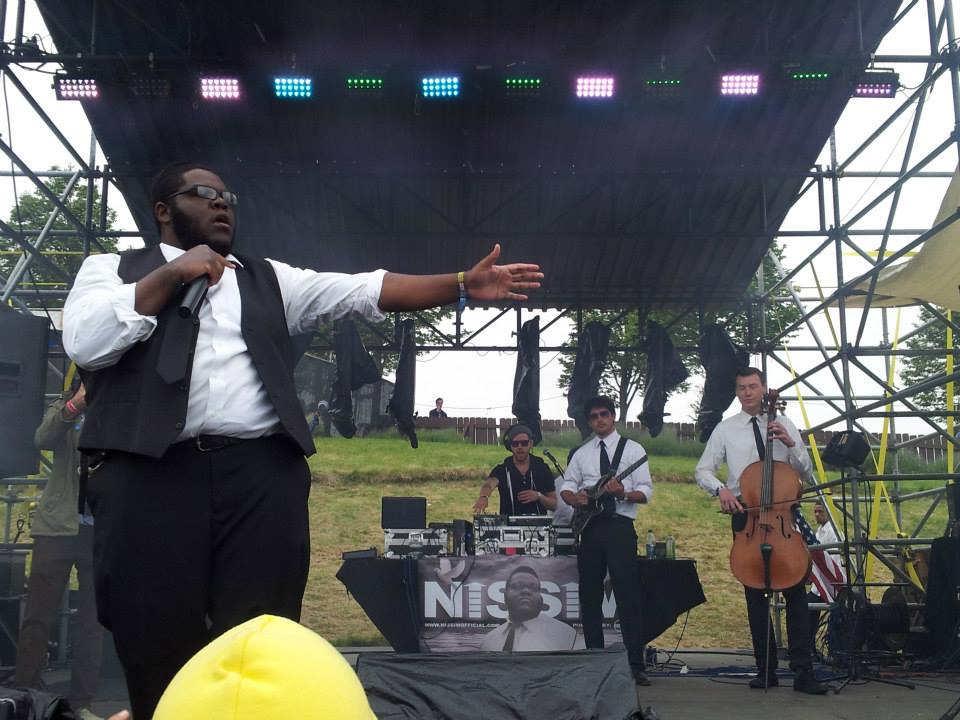
Black performing in May 2013

After The Cause and Effect's release, Black, now a husband and father, began questioning his Christian beliefs, turning to Messianic Judaism and convincing his wife to follow suit. He also started listening to artists like Common and Lauryn Hill; both developments began to strongly influence his music. In 2008, he contributed to Jake One's debut album, White Van Music, with the song "God Like", which received play on MTV.

In 2009, Black released his second album, Ali'yah. The album spent five weeks at number 4 on CMJ's hip hop charts, while the video for its lead single, "Yesterday", also gained regular rotation on MTV. That same year, he performed at Bumbershoot and returned to Capitol Hill Block Party. He was also one of the candidates to portray rapper The Notorious B.I.G. in the 2009 biopic Notorious, a role that ultimately went to Jamal Woolard.

Six months after the album's release, Black renounced his belief in Jesus and Christianity. He met members from Jews for Judaism, which helped him embark on a new path.

No longer supporting the album's message but unable to quit his contract, he agreed to promote it, but refused to accept money outside of touring expenses and refused to perform on Shabbat. He officially retired in 2011 after releasing The Blackest Brown EP with friend and fellow rapper Bradley "B." Brown. He subsequently moved to Seward Park's Jewish community and began studying for conversion with Rabbi Simon Benzaquen at the Sephardic Bikur Holim Congregation. During this time, he cut off all connections to his previous career, including abandoning his position at Sportn' Life and even getting rid of his own music collection.

=== Return to rapping, Nissim, and Lemala (2012–2017) ===
Near the end of his conversion process, Black's son developed meningitis and had to be hospitalized, a blow to the financially struggling family. While praying over the situation in his study, Black discovered that a long-broken microphone had begun working again, and took this as a sign to return to music.

He officially announced his return to music in September 2012. The following December, he appeared on the Shtar song "Rabbit Hole" from their album Boss EP.

On February 26, 2013, he released the mixtape Miracle Music, his first official recording under his new stage name and Hebrew name, Nissim. The following May, he appeared at the 2013 Sasquatch! Music Festival. Following a recording session in London Bridge Studio, he released his first new album, the self-titled Nissim, on September 17. He closed out the year with "The Black Miracle", a Hanukkah single produced by Aish.com.

In 2016, after relocating to Israel, Nissim collaborated with Gad Elbaz on the song "Hashem Melech 2.0" and with Lipa Schmeltzer on "Bar Mitzvah Time." The following year, on March 10, 2017, he released his fourth album, Lemala, which featured collaborations with Elbaz, DeScribe, Netanel Israel, and Yisroel Laub.

=== Gibor and Love Notes (2018–present) ===
Black performing in September 2026

Black returned in July 2018 with the single "King of the World", announced as the lead single of an upcoming fifth album entitled Gibor. That December, he performed at a charity Hanukkah concert in Brooklyn alongside Shea Rubenstein, Mendy Pellin, and Six13. Gibor was released on December 9, 2019, through Marom Entertainment, with guest features including Menachem Weinstein, Avi Kraus, and Alex Clare. This was also the first official album to credit Black as Nissim Black rather than simply Nissim (he had been using both intermittently since 2016).

In February 2020, Black released a new standalone single, "Mothaland Bounce". The song, released with a Coming to America-inspired music video directed by Leon Robinson and Joel Kipnis, addresses the relationship between the rapper's Black and Jewish identities, such as Black describing himself as "Hitler's worst nightmare". Following two more singles, "Win" and "Best Friend", Black released a new mixtape entitled Love Notes on August 16, 2020.

Since Love Notes, Black has released a string of singles and collaborated with artists including Yosef Daniel, Kosha Dillz, Shlomo Katz, and Levi Robin. "Mothaland Bounce" peaked at No. 4 on the Israeli charts, while "The Hanukkah Song 2.0" and "Adored" peaked at No. 5 and No. 21 respectively.

== Other work ==
In October 2020, Black was a guest on conservative commentator Ben Shapiro's podcast The Ben Shapiro Show, where he defended hip hop against Shapiro's previous critiques of the genre. Black started his own podcast, The Deal with Nissim Black, in May 2021 through SoulShop Studios; notable guests have included Rudy Rochman, Vanessa Zoltan, Fatman Scoop, Meir Kay, Amar'e Stoudemire, Brandon Tatum, Tamir Goodman, Coleman Hughes, and Rabbi Tovia Singer. That same month, Black launched his own whisky brand, the Israel-based Hava Whisky.

In April 2022, Deadline Hollywood reported that HBO Max was developing Motherland Bounce, a comedy series based on Black's life, with comedian Moshe Kasher announced as showrunner, Black as story writer, Salli Richardson as director, and all three as executive producers.

== Personal life ==
Black and his wife Adina, with whom he has seven children, were initially married in 2008; they re-married in an Orthodox Jewish marriage ceremony in March 2013 at the Sephardic Bikur Holim Congregation after both had converted. The marriage was a double ceremony shared with his childhood friend Yosef Brown and Yosef's wife Chana, both fellow converts. Black and his family continued to live in Seward Park, the Seattle neighborhood where he grew up, until making aliyah to Israel in 2016 and settling in Jerusalem. He self-identifies as a follower of Breslov Hasidism and makes pilgrimage to Uman every Rosh Hashanah.

In an August 2018 interview with Menachem Toker of Radio Kol Chai, Black revealed that his children had been subjected to racial discrimination when they were denied admission to several local Haredi yeshivas explicitly because they were black. He also said that he had sought advice on the matter from Rav Chaim Kanievsky during a meeting and was told, "Being black is your mayla (advantage) and not a chesaron (disadvantage)." Due to discrimination they experienced in the Meah Shearim neighborhood of Jerusalem, Black and his family relocated to the nearby city of Beit Shemesh.

Black contracted COVID-19 in July 2020 and was hospitalized at Shaare Zedek Medical Center in Jerusalem; he and his family remained in quarantine until Tisha B'Av. After recovering from the disease, he reduced his coffee intake and adopted a ketogenic diet. Speaking to The Jerusalem Post in 2021, he expressed concern with the Israeli government's COVID-19 pandemic response: "I understand the government wanted to make things safe but I think they went a little overboard. I think people were almost ready for a rebellion."

Black has been critical of the Black Lives Matter movement, accusing them of promoting division and denouncing their characterization of police officers as racists, their calls for abolishing the police, and what he called their "support [of] Palestinians over the Jews". Despite this, he has said he prefers not to be involved in political or religious disputes and has encouraged unity in the Jewish community.

After moving to Jerusalem, Black described living a Haredi life in which his family kept a kosher home and observed Shabbat restrictions including not driving, using phones, or switching electricity on and off. A 2018 profile also reported that the household had no television or internet and that Black regularly studied Torah.

== Discography ==
=== Albums ===
- The Cause and Effect (2007; re-released 2009)
- Ali'yah (2009)
- Nissim (2013)
- Lemala (2017)
- Gibor (2019)
- Glory (2024)

=== EPs ===
- The Blackest Brown EP (2011)

=== Mixtapes ===
- Behind the Dirt (2005; re-released 2010)
- Miracle Music (2013)
- Love Notes (2020)

=== Compilations ===
- The Sportn' Life Compilation Vol. 1 (2003)

=== Singles and music videos ===
Year	Song	Album	Director	Notes
2006	"Get Loose"	The Cause and Effect	The Note	
2009	"Yesterday" (ft. Marissa)	Ali'yah	Bryan Campbell	
2012	"Ricochet"	Non-album single		
2013	"Unbelievable"	Miracle Music		
2013	"Chronicles"	Miracle Music	Zach Grashin & Sam Chasan	
2013	"Live for Now" (ft. Bonhom)	Nissim	Nissim & Altrac Productions	
2013	"Sores" (ft. Rabbi Simon Benzaquen)	Nissim	Nissim	live studio video
2013	"Revered"	Nissim	Nissim & Altrac Productions	
2013	"The Black Miracle"	Non-album single	BiG Productions	Hanukkah video for Aish.com
2014	"Yerushalayim" (ft. Eric Gestenfeld)	Non-album single		
2014	"Falling Star" (ft. Gabriel Mintz)	Non-album single		
2016	"Zman Cheruteinu"	Lemala	Sawyer Purman & Ben Anderson	
2016	"Tagid Todah" (ft. Netanel Israel)	Lemala		
2016	"A Million Years" (ft. Yisroel Laub)	Lemala	Aharon Orian	
2016	"Hashem Melech 2.0" (ft. Gad Elbaz)	Lemala	Daniel Finkelman	
2017	"Fly Away"	Lemala	Daniel Finkelman	
2018	"King of the World"	Gibor		lyric video
2018	"Mercy"	Gibor	Sawyer Purman & Ben Anderson	
2019	"Wings" (ft. Menachem Weinstein)	Gibor		
2019	"Hold On" (ft. Avi Kraus)	Gibor	Aharon Orian	PSA for Amudim
2019	"Eight Flames"	Gibor	Nataniel Khafizov	
2019	"Never Forget"	Non-album single		
2020	"Mothaland Bounce"	Non-album single	Leon Robinson & Joel Kipnis	
2020	"Win"	Love Notes	Nissim Black & Liron Afuta	
2020	"Best Friend"	Love Notes	Nissim Black & Liron Afuta	
2020	"Rerun"	Non-album single	Nissim Black & Liron Afuta	
2020	"Love Letter"	Non-album single		
2020	"Smile"	Non-album single		
2020	"The Hava Song"	Non-album single	Nissim Black & Liron Afuta	
2020	"Honest"	Non-album single		
2020	"All Black"	Non-album single		
2020	"Let It Go"	Non-album single		
2021	"God's Baby"	Non-album single		
2021	"Lean on You"	Non-album single		
2021	"Only One"	Non-album single		
2021	"Tears"	Non-album single		
2021	"Willing to Lose"	Non-album single		
2021	"Be True"	Non-album single		
2021	"Milagros" (ft. Yosef Daniel)	Non-album single		
2021	"Hope"	Non-album single		
2021	"Higher"	Non-album single	Nissim Black & Yaakov Citron	
2021	"Change"	Non-album single	Nissim Black & Yaakov Citron	
2021	"The Hanukkah Song 2.0" (ft. Kosha Dillz)	Non-album single	Matthew Kyle Levine	Remix of Adam Sandler's "The Chanukah Song"
2021	"Brooklyn"	Non-album single	Daniel Finkelman	
2021	"Adored"	Non-album single	Nissim Black & Yaakov Citron	
2022	"Lifted" (ft. Levi Robin)	Non-album single	Nissim Black & Yaakov Citron	
2022	"Human Greatness 2.0" (ft. Dustin Paul)	Non-album single	Nissim Black & Yaakov Citron	
2022	"Away From Here"	Non-album single	Nissim Black & Yaakov Citron	
2022	"Victory"	Non-album single	Liron Afuta	
2023	"Fired Up"	Non-album single	Yael Bohbot	
2023	"Hu Hamelech" (ft. Gad Elbaz)	Non-album single	Zvika Bornstein	
2023	"SCREAM"	Non-album single	Nissim Black & Liron Afuta	
2023	"LOVE ME" (ft. Oryahh)	Non-album single	Nissim Black & Liron Afuta	
2024	Speed Dial	Non-album single		

=== Guest appearances ===
- Jake One, White Van Music (as D. Black) (2008; Rhymesayers) - "God Like"
- Diwon, New Game (2013; Bancs Media) - "Try Stopping" ft. Mikhael, Open Mike Eagle
- Shtar, Boss EP (2012) - "Rabbit Hole"
- Lipa Schmeltzer, "Bar Mitzvah Time" (2016)
- Gad Elbaz, "WeR1" ft. Alliel, DeScribe, Refael Mirila (2016)
- Gad Elbaz, "L'Chaim" (2017)
- Six13, "Lo Avater" (2017)
- Otsar, "Hashem Shomer" (2018)
- Yoni Z, "Home" (2019)
- Avi Delanti, "Peace In The World" (2019)
- Chaim Dovid Berson, "Kulanu Nezamer" (2020)
- Aharon Wyne, "Born for This" (2020)
- L'Chaim OG, "Ani Po 2.0" (2020)
- Own3r, "Once in a Lifetime" (2021)
- R' Shua Bitton, "Upside Down" (2021)
- Shlomo Katz, "Chayot Hanohamot" (2021)
- Shuki Salomon, "Shir Hachatunot" (2021)
- New York Boys Choir, "Bring It On" (2021)

=== Production credits ===
- L.V. and Prodeje, The Playground (2002)
- C-Blunt, Julius Ceasar (2002)
- South Central Cartel, South Central Hella (2003)
- Wicked, One Out of Many (2006)
- Lil Al, Hood Raised (2006)
- Fatal Lucciano, The Only Forgotten Son (2007)
- Brownside, 13 Reasons (2008)
- Brown King, Back to Jesus (2008)
