= Infinity (Shtar album) =

Studio album by Shtar
- Released: May 2, 2010
- Recorded: 2010 at Shemesh Music studio, Ma'alot-Tarshiha
- Genres: Hip hop, rock
- Length: 46:10
- Labels: Shemesh Music (first release), Shemspeed, HaTav HaShmini (8th Note)
- Producers: David Epstein, Brad Rubinstein

Shtar chronology
Infinity (2010)	Boss EP (2012)

Infinity is the debut studio album by Jewish hip hop band Shtar. Produced by then-drummer David Epstein, the album was originally released by the independent Shemesh Music label on May 2, 2010. After the band was signed to the larger indie label Shemspeed a year later, it was re-released by that label on March 5, 2012.

== Recording, production, and composition ==
The album was recorded in 2010 at Shemesh Music Recording Studio in Ma'alot-Tarshiha. It was produced and mixed by then-drummer David Epstein and guitarist Brad Rubinstein.

Musically, the songs on the album combine lead vocalist Ori Murray's rapped verses with melodic choruses that echo Shlomo Carlebach, Sephardic music, and funk, among many other artists and genres. Rubinstein told Yedioth Ahronoth, "It's not just hip hop, I mean, it's more like pop, rock, techno, trip hop, and groove. So, ordinarily, like, the verses are all hip hop, but the choruses are something you'd expect from a cool pop band and a rock band." "If you listen on the CD," Murray noted, "there's an entirely acoustic track with no rapping...[The album is] a broad spectrum of everything."

Lyrically, the album is similarly divided, with the choruses quoting traditional Jewish prayers such as "Adon Olam" and "Ashrei", and the original English verses exploring Orthodox Jewish themes such as God's infinity, "tikun olam", the soul, and returning to Zion. Max Elstein Keisler of The Forward noted that "Shtar's music...has none of the egocentrism of hip hop."

== Release and promotion ==
The album's initial release was promoted with the single "Modeh (Restoring My Soul)". A music video, directed by Shmuel Hoffman and filmed in Beit Shemesh, Israel, was released on April 6, 2010. The video on YouTube, shot in black-and-white, depicts the band performing in a studio, as well as various locations around the city.

Originally released by the independent Shemesh Music label on May 2, 2010, the album was re-released on March 5, 2012 under the Shemspeed label, who had signed the band several months prior, with the HaTav HaShmini (8th Note) label handling distribution in Israel.

== Track listing ==
1. "Infinity" - 4:10
2. "Shir Hamaalos" - 3:21
3. "Kel Adon" - 5:11
4. "Modeh (Restoring My Soul)" - 3:18
5. "Tikun Haolam" - 3:27
6. "Odecha" - 3:48
7. "Oseh" - 3:38
8. "Adon Olam" - 3:10
9. "Ashrei" - 3:25
10. "Shira Chadasha" - 3:40
11. "Heavenly Glow" - 5:08
12. "Nagila" - 3:54

== Personnel ==
- Ori Murray - rapping
- Brad Rubinstein - guitar, songwriting, production
- Dan "Zaki" Isaac - background vocals, percussion
- Alex Lopez-Dias - bass guitar
- David Epstein - drums, production
