= Lipa Schmeltzer =

Jewish singer, entertainer and composer (born 1978)

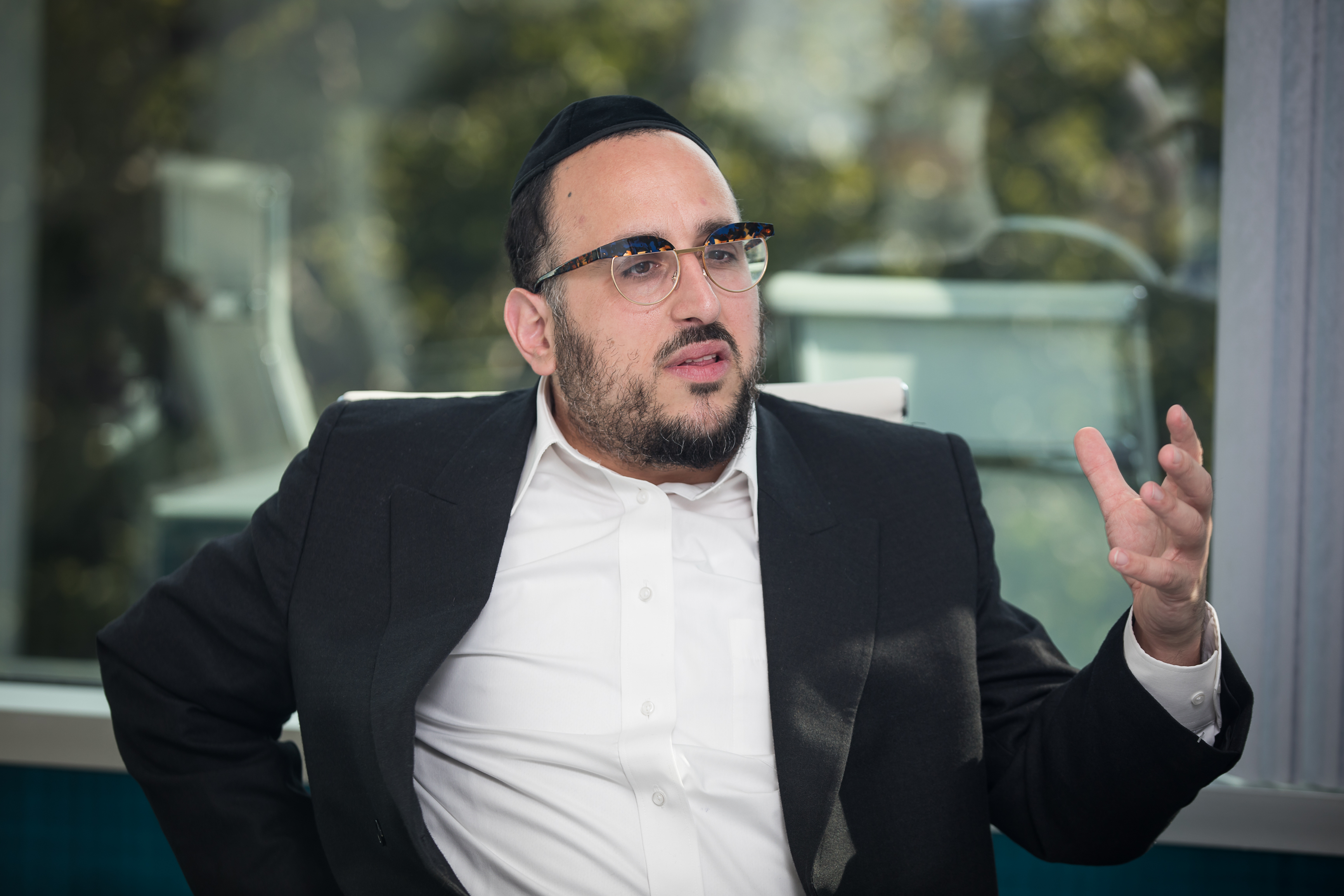
- Schmeltzer in 2018

Background information
- Born: Eluzor Lipa Schmelczer; March 17, 1978 (age 48); New Square, New York, United States
- Genre: Contemporary Jewish
- Occupations: Vocalist, composer, singer, performer
- Years active: 1998–present
- Spouse: Miriam Schmeltzer (m. 1998, divorced)

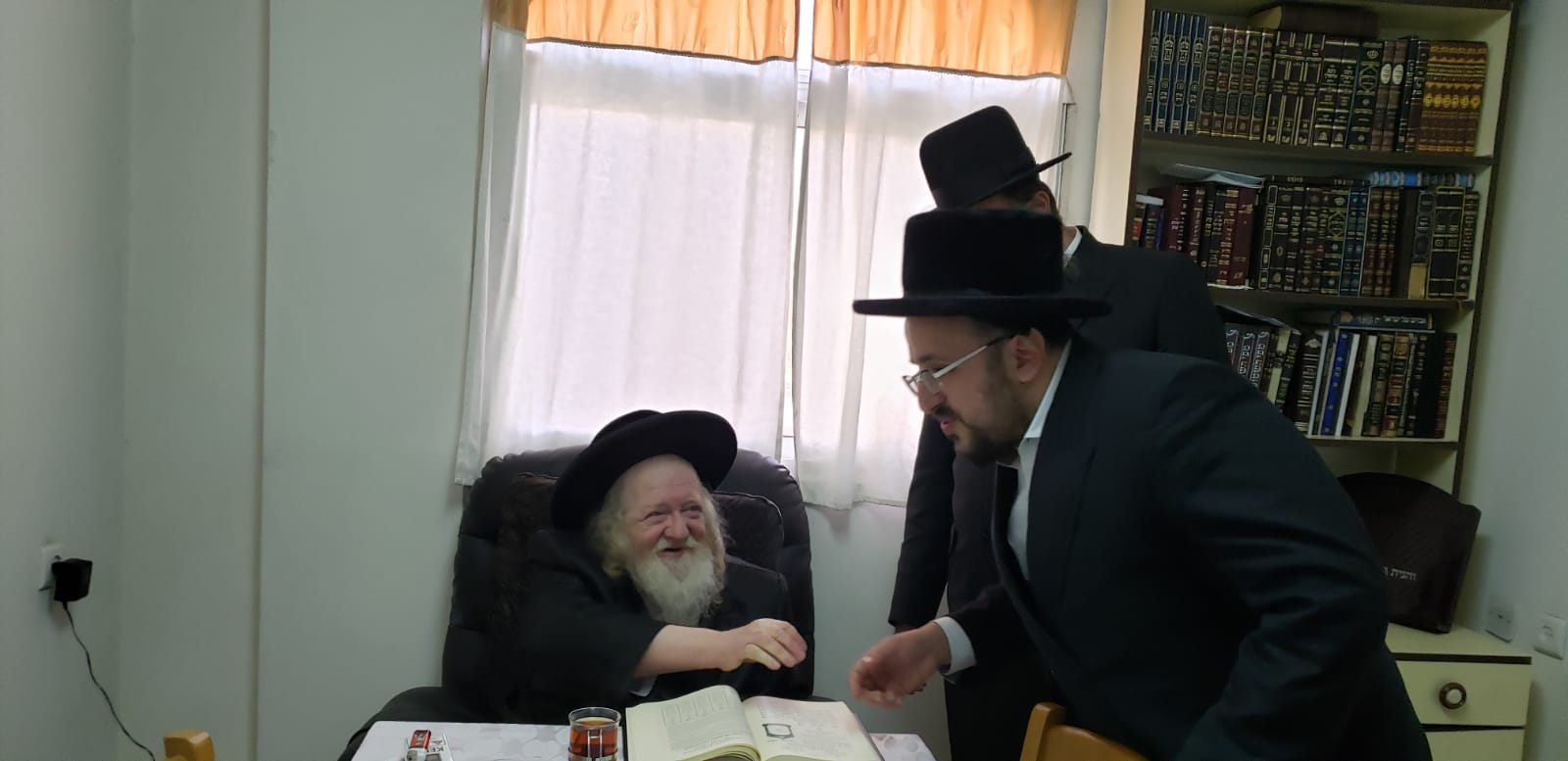
Lipa at a visit to the Kretshnif Rebbe of Kiryat Gat, Feb. 2019

Lipa Schmeltzer (Yiddish: אלעזר ליפא שמעלצער, Hebrew: ליפא שמלצר; born March 17, 1978) is an American singer, entertainer, and composer. He is a headliner in Hasidic as well as modern Jewish communities worldwide. He has released 19 solo albums.

== Family background ==
Born March 17, 1978, Schmeltzer grew up in the Hasidic enclave of New Square, New York a village in Rockland County, New York. His grandfather, a Hasidic farmer in pre-war Hungary, was murdered during World War II, leaving his father, Reuven, an orphan at the age of 13. Reuven Schmeltzer was one of the 1,684 Jews who escaped Nazi-controlled Hungary on the Kastner train and spent time in the Bergen-Belsen concentration camp before being released in Switzerland. He and his wife had 12 children, of whom Lipa is the second-youngest.

Schmeltzer suffered from an undiagnosed attention deficit disorder and had difficulty concentrating. According to him, he was sexually assaulted as a child.

Schmeltzer studied at the Makova yeshiva in Kiryat Ata, Israel. He married his wife, Miriam, also a native of New Square, on August 27, 1998 (they have since divorced). They have four children.

Schmeltzer lives in Pomona, New York, from where he sings at his home studio.

== Musical career ==
After his wedding, Schmeltzer tried to find work as a badchen (entertainer) for weddings. Though he had no formal musical training, he began performing at weddings and bar mitzvahs in the Haredi Hasidic communities of upstate New York and Brooklyn. He earned a reputation as a natural performer, and began releasing recordings and videos. The first, Nor B'Simcha (Just Be Happy), was released shortly after his wedding. He borrowed $15,000 to produce the album. It was not successful, and he released his second album Shema in 2001 with producer JJ Fried. With his thick, round eyeglasses and sidelocks, "outlandish" outfits, and comical YouTube videos, he has rocketed to stardom in the Hasidic music world.

Schmeltzer's music has both gained popularity and generated controversy within the American Hasidic community due to the fusion of traditional Hasidic music and lyrics with contemporary music styles. His performance range includes "hard-driving rock tunes, jazzy shuffles, pseudo-rap numbers, solemn prayers, klezmer dances and jokey skits, accompanied by a nine-piece band and a troupe of actors". He writes lyrics in English, Hebrew, and Yiddish. Schmeltzer's concerts are not gender-segregated, as is the norm in Hasidic circles.

Schmeltzer has been criticized for introducing "too modern" musical styles to the Hasidic community. Opponents contend that Schmeltzer's identity as a bona fide Hasid makes him more appealing to a wider Hasidic audience and therefore more likely to introduce contemporary music to their community, which tends to be insular and more reserved.

Schmeltzer's latest album, Eluzer Lipa'le, was produced using Dolby Atmos sound, which is the first Jewish music album to do so.

== Benefit performances ==
Schmeltzer frequently contributes his talents for Jewish benefit performances. He has also written songs and performed in response to tragedies within the Hasidic community. After Chabad shluchim Gavriel and Rivka Holtzberg were murdered in a 2008 terrorist attack in Mumbai and their two-year-old son Moishe was saved, he wrote the song A Letter to Moishe'le. He was part of an all-star group of Jewish musicians who produced a musical tribute to Sholom Rubashkin after the latter's conviction in federal court in 2010. Following the 2011 murder of Leiby Kletzky in Brooklyn, he released a ballad called "Leiby Forever" and a seven-minute music video depicting home movies of Kletzky growing up.

== "The Big Event" controversy ==
In February 2008, a large amount of publicity was generated for a concert at Madison Square Garden's WaMu Theater in New York City featuring Schmeltzer and Shloime Gertner, under the playbill "The Big Event". On 20 February, a full-page notice was printed in the Hamodia, the most prominent Haredi newspaper. The notice stated that it was "a serious prohibition to attend or perform" at the concert that would lead to "ribaldry and lightheadedness" and added that it was "forbidden to hire these singers to sing at any party, celebration or charity event".

Following speculation over whether Schmeltzer would cancel the concert due to the ban, on 26 February it was confirmed that he was canceling his performance. He was quoted by The New York Times as saying, "I have a career, I have a wife and kids to support, I have a mortgage to pay, I have to get out of the fire". At the same time, Schmeltzer pulled out of a concert scheduled for later that month in London with other singers.

In an interview in June 2008, Schmeltzer stated: "I made a Kiddush Hashem and I don’t regret it. But if I had known the truth about how things were presented to the gedolei hatorah, I would not have cancelled the concert." Schmeltzer said that "Many gedolei hatorah have told me that people came to them with false information regarding my concert: they said it would have mixed dancing or mixed seating."

In 2009, one of the most prestigious rabbis who signed the document, Rabbi Shmuel Kamenetsky, told The Jewish Star newspaper that he had no problem with Lipa: "As far as I know he is an ehrliche Yid [a truly devout Jew]."

Three months after the controversy, Schmeltzer released his next album, titled A Poshiter Yid (A Simple Jew), with a cover image and songs that portrayed him as a tradition-minded, Torah-observant Jew instead of the rock idol portrayed by the ban. Since that release, Schmeltzer's concert and recording schedules have increased.

Shortly after the cancellation of "The Big Event", promoters began planning another concert with the scaled-down name "The Event", which went off without controversy before a sell-out crowd at Madison Square Garden's WaMu Theater on March 1, 2009. Later the same year, Aderet Records released a double CD and DVD of "The Event".

== Other activities ==
In 2010, Schmeltzer built a synagogue, Beis Medrash D'Airmont, in the village of Airmont, New York. He sold it in 2018.

Schmeltzer attended Rockland Community College, a two-year school that is part of the State University of New York (SUNY) system. He pursued a dual associate degree in performing arts and liberal arts. On May 18, 2014, he graduated with a GPA of 3.902.

In April 2014, Schmeltzer received a Chancellor's Award of Excellence from SUNY, the highest honor bestowed upon a student.

In 2014, Schmeltzer was studying Creative Writing and Visual Art at Columbia University's School of General Studies. He graduated from Columbia University in May 2018 with a Bachelor of Arts degree magna cum laude. In December 2011, Schmeltzer sang at Mayor Michael Bloomberg's annual Hanukkah party at the Jewish Heritage Museum, accompanied by the Freilach Orchestra.

In December 2015, Schmeltzer sang at the annual White House Hanukkah Party, and promised President Barack Obama a special gift, a gold and silver yarmulke. In May 2016, Schmeltzer traveled to Washington, D.C., and delivered Obama the promised gift of a gold and silver yarmulke.

In 2016, Schmeltzer appeared in an Israeli television ad for Pepsi Max.

In December 2016, Schmeltzer sang "God Bless America" in Yiddish (as "Gott Bensch Amerike") in Brooklyn Borough Hall at the inauguration of New York Civil Court Judge Rachel Freier.

In September 2017, Reuven Schmeltzer, Lipa's father, died and the Skverer Rebbe came to be menachem avel (to console the mourner) him while sitting shivah.

Schmeltzer also works as a painter from his studio in his house.

During the Gaza war, Schmeltzer visited Israel to sing for and support IDF soldiers.

== Discography ==
- Nor B'simcha (1999)
- Shema (2000)
- Letova (2001)
- Purim In Skver (2002)
- Bederech (2003)
- Le'eilu Uleeilu (2004)
- The New Project X (2005)
- Keneina Hora (2005)
- Hallel (2006)
- The Lipa Experience (DVD) (2007)
- The Next Project X (2007)
- A Poshiter Yid (2008)
- Non Stop Lipa (2009)
- Me'imka D'Lipa: From the Depth of My Heart (2010)
- 24/6 Lipa (2011)
- Leiby Forever (2011)
- Leap of Faith (2012)
- Dus Pintele - The Hidden Spark (2013)
- B Positive (with Matt Dubb) (2015)
- Lipa On Broadway (DVD) (2015)
- Lipa's Gevaldig (2020)
- BavLipa (2022)
- Ritzious Shimmy Schmeltzer Bar Mitzvah (2022)
- Yom Tov Lipa (2023)
- Eluzer Lipa'la (2025)

=== Music videos ===
- "Gelt" (2006)
- "Abi Me'leibt" (2006)
- "Hentelach Around the World" (2009)
- "A Letter To Moishele" (2009)
- "Hang Up the Phone" (2012)
- "Mizrach" (2012)
- "Believe in a Miracle" (2012)
- "Mitzva Tantz" (2014)
- "The Reveal" ft. Ari Lesser (2014)
- "Kaf Al Kaf" ft. The Kinderlach (2014)
- "Ben Fayga" ft. Matt Dubb (2015)
- "Shain Vi Di Levone" (2015)
- "BELZ" (2015)
- "Bar Mitzvah Time" ft. Nissim (2016)
- "Heal us" (2020)
- "Abaye Ve'ruva" (2022)
- "Drapenen" (2024)
- "Hold On Tight" (2024)
- "Super Seder" (2025)

=== Guest appearances and singles ===
- Kol Mevaser (Yehoshua Breuer) [part of the children's choir]
- Tzur Chayeinu (Gidon Levine/The Best of the Best 2)
- Nor B'Simcha (Lechaim Productions /Di Yidishe Kroen)
- Moshe Rabeini (Mona Rosenblum/Mona 4)
- Yevani (Oif Simchas and Friends)
- Malchuso (Skver)
- Ach Tov (Mona Rosenblum/Philharmona 3)
- Gelt (Hasc 17)
- Abi M'lebt (Hasc 18)
- Diet (Hasc 20)
- Elka D'mier Aneni (Hamenagnim/Eleka D'meir Aneni)
- Zchus Avos & Birchas Kohanim (Lechaim/Yiddishie Brillanten)
- Borcheni Avinu (Lechaim/Mesikas 2)
- Melech Rachman (Lechaim/Mesikas 3)
- Lo Nafalti & Mr Dj (Yitzy Schwartz/ Second Dance 2)
- Aneni (Suki & Ding/Mit A Yiddish Taam)
- Yavani (Oif Simchas & Friends)
- Rachem Nu (Avi Fishoff/Sheves Achim)
- Kabeid (Oorah/The Shmorg)
- Am Echad (Oorah/The Shmorg)
- Mitzvah Tantz (Oorah/The Shmorg)
- Hentlech Around The World (Oorah/The Shmorg)
- Sunrise (Oorah/The Shmorg)
- Chadoshot Tovot (Bekhila/Leshorer Shir Chadosh 1)
- Knesses Yisroel (Sheya Mendlowitz/Big Time - Alter Heim)
- Rabbi R' Elimelech (Yossi Gil/V'Eineini Sirenu)
- Yossel (Yossi Green/The 8th Note)
- Bikur Cholim (Single)
- Acharon Acharon Chaviv Featuring Describe (Remix)
- Kol Me (Ami Magazine/Big Voices)
- Shain Vi De Levoneh Featuring The Holocaust Survivor Band (Single)
- Belz Featuring The Holocaust Survivor Band (Single)
- Make It Happen (Kinderlach/Make It Happen)
- Kaf Al Kaf Featuring Kinderlach (Single)
- Echad Mi Yodea Featuring Kinderlach (Single)
- Lo Yisa Goi (Shlomo Yehuda Rechnitz/Shir 1)
- Mekor Chochmah (Single)
- Believe In A Miracle (Cecilia Margules/The Believe In A Miracle Collection )
- The Reveal Featuring Ari Leser)
- Bar Mitzvah Time Featuring Nissim Black (Single)
- Yona Motzoh (Tzvi Silberstein/Kol Hakochavim)
- Simchas Beis Hashoeva (Lev Tahor/LTV)
- Chap Nisht (Levik T/The Shlager Project)
- Shabbos Kodesh Featuring Rephael Biberfeld (Single)
- Shnooder In Adar Featuring Yossi Lowy & Hillel Kapnick (Single)
- Let It Go (Single)
- Yesh Manhig (Sruli Bodansky/Fingerprints)
- Beis Hamikdash Hashlishi (Chaskie Weiss/Lev El Haneshama)
- Srulikel (Single)
- Heal Us (Single)
