= Alon De Loco =

Israeli singer, rapper, producer

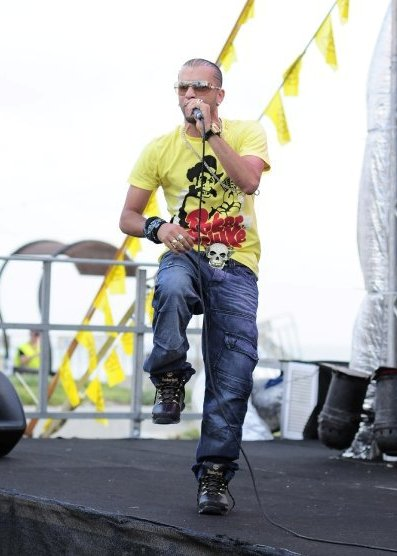

Background information
- Born: Alon Cohen; November 15, 1974 (age 51)
- Origin: Beersheba, Israel
- Genres: Hip hop, R&B, reggaeton, dancehall
- Years active: 2005–present
- Labels: I&I Records, Geffen Records
- Website: alon-deloco.com

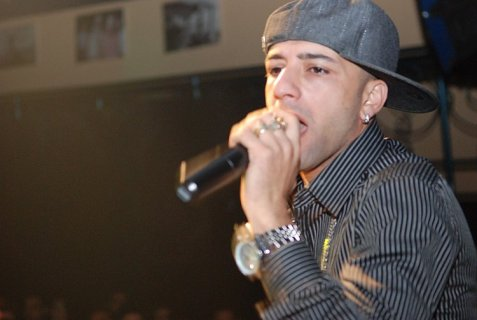

Alon Cohen (Hebrew: אלון כהן, born November 25, 1974), known professionally by his stage name Alon De Loco, is an Israeli singer, rapper and record producer. De Loco is one of the leading artists of the Israeli reggaeton.

== Personal life ==
Cohen was born in Beersheba, Israel, to a family of Mizrahi Jewish (Iraqi-Jewish and Moroccan-Jewish) descent. He is married with 4 children. Cohen, his wife, and his child were living in poverty when he began his musical career, and he later said that he entered music to ensure a better life and future for himself and his family.

== Career ==
In 2005 he released his debut album Party Material (חומר למסיבה), the album is one of the first Israeli reggaeton albums and includes the single "Halayla Ze Hazman" featuring Gad Elbaz. 2 years later he released his second album "Does Da Party".

In 2007 he wrote to Sarit Hadad her song "Hamesiba" from her album "Ze Sheshomer Alay".

In 2011, he appeared in the reality series Living in La La Land and won it.

In 2013 he released "Loco Wine" featuring Static, Omri 69 Segal, Boomerang, and his daughter Or Cohen, which got many praises. the song entered to his hits collection "De Loco Collection". He also performs with Gad Elbaz on his L'Chaim album singing the song True Love.

== Discography ==
- 2005: Party Material
- 2007: Does Da Party
- 2010: Shi Vol. 1
- 2013: De Loco Collection
