= Levi Robin =

- Born: Yaakov Levi Robin; 1992 (age 33–34)
- Origin: Huntington Beach, California
- Genres: Jewish music, indie folk
- Occupations: Singer, songwriter, guitarist
- Instruments: Vocals, guitar
- Years active: 2013-present
- Website: levirobin.com

Yaakov Levi Robin (born 1992) is an American Hasidic folk singer based in Huntington Beach, California. He first gained attention as an opening act for Matisyahu, and released his self-titled debut EP in 2014.

== Biography ==
=== Early life ===
Robin grew up in California's Orange County. He began playing guitar and writing songs at age 12, and later performed at clubs in Hollywood with a band that ultimately broke up. He was athletic as a child, participating in gymnastics and baseball.

Raised in a non-observant family, Robin first discovered Hasidism at 17, when some friends of his father were attempting to start a shul in Venice Beach with a rabbi who had studied under the Lubavitcher Rebbe. Intrigued by the Chabad philosophy, Robin studied the works of movement founder Rabbi Shneur Zalman of Liadi, including the Tanya and the Shulchan Aruch HaRav, and began attending shul regularly after his father died.

=== Career ===
Robin released his debut EP, the self-titled Levi Robin EP, on February 4, 2013. Subsequently, Jewish reggae singer Matisyahu began promoting Robin on Twitter and invited him to be an opening act for his 25-city acoustic tour. Later that year, Robin performed alongside the Moshe Hecht Band at the Roulette Theater as part of a fundraiser for Lamplighters Yeshivah.

In late 2015, Robin performed at a Sofar Sounds concert in New York. The following month, he and Gad Elbaz played at a Chabad menorah lighting inside Barclays Center accompanying a New York Islanders game.

Robin announced in early 2016 that he was working on new material with producers Stu Brooks and Joel Hamilton.

Robin released New Moon Rising in 2025, made in conjunction with Los Angeles-based producer Fraymes.

== Artistry ==
Robin's style of folk rock has been compared to Mumford & Sons, Iron & Wine, and Bob Dylan. He has stated that his early songs were conceived almost unconsciously: "I was relying on my subconscious to teach me messages. I would mouth sounds until they became words and so I had whole songs that I didn’t understand." He has also identified his faith as an influence, saying, "Being a Jew is an inner experience of growing in this context. I’m trying to tap into my American roots and express my American Jewish journey."

== Discography ==
=== EPs ===
- Levi Robin EP (2013)

=== Albums ===
- Where Night Meets Day (2020)
- New Moon Rising (2025)

=== Singles ===
- "Days of Our Youth" (2016)
- "Airplane" (2017)
- "Hey Love" (2017)
- "No Other" (2020)
