= Six13 =

New York-based Jewish all-male a cappella group

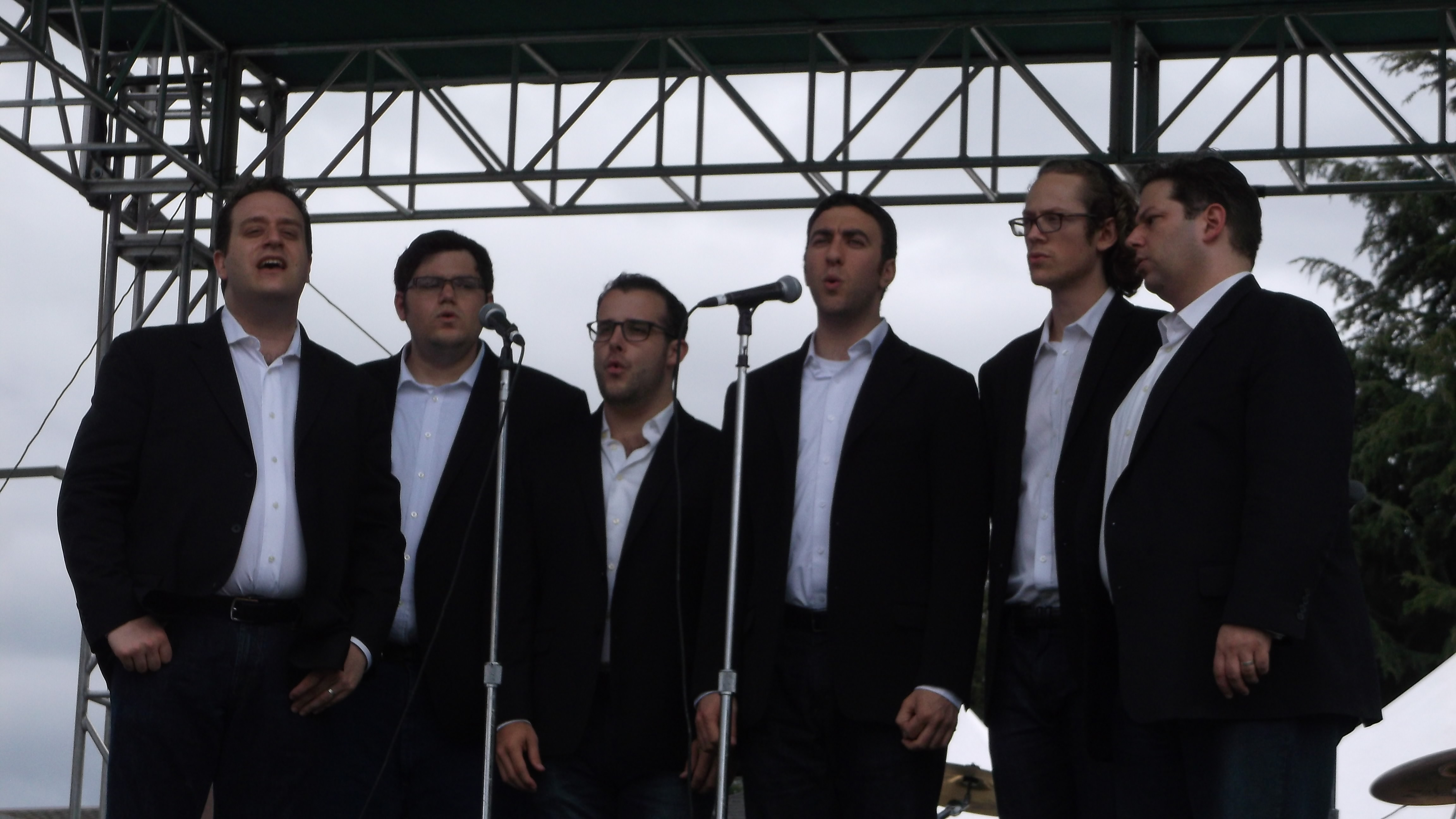

Background information
- Origin: New York City
- Genres: A cappella, beatboxing, covers, parody
- Years active: 2003–present
- Members: Mike Boxer; Lior Melnick; Craig Resmovits; Nathaniel Ribner; Josh Sauer; Mordy Weinstein; Chaim Moskowitz; Eitan Hiller
- Past members: Carl Haber; Aaron Kohl; Jacob Spadaro; Rob Operman; Alan Zeitlin; Moshe Cohn; Noah Aronson; Justin Rosenblum; Avi Ishofsky; Eric Dinowitz
- Website: www.six13.com

Six13 is a New York–based Jewish all-male a cappella singing group. Formed in 2003, the six-voice group is known for parodying contemporary pop songs by adding Jewish themes and lyrics. It also sings cover versions of pop hits and Yiddish and Israeli classics, and produces original compositions based on traditional Jewish prayers. Relying solely on vocals, the group achieves the effects of guitar, bass, drums, and electronic music through beatboxing and multiple layering of vocal tracks on its music videos. The group performs regularly for universities, synagogues, public and private groups, and in music festivals. It has released eight albums and won numerous awards.

== History ==
Six13 was formed in 2003 at Binghamton University by then-student Mike Boxer. Boxer tapped several of his religious Jewish college friends for the new group, which was named for the 613 commandments of the Torah. The group performs with six voices at each concert appearance. In addition to vocals, group members do beatboxing.

=== Parodies ===
Six13 is best known for their parodies of contemporary pop songs, incorporating Jewish-themed lyrics. Like other Jewish a cappella groups, they produce an annual music video to honor the holidays of Hanukkah and Passover. Their Hanukkah songs include "Bohemian Chanukah", a 2018 parody of Queen's "Bohemian Rhapsody", in which the bridge "Mamma mia, mamma mia" is recast as "Abba, Ima, Abba, Ima" (Hebrew for "Father, Mother, Father, Mother"), and a 2019 video featuring traditional Hanukkah songs and prayers sung to music from Star Wars.

For Passover, they released "Chozen", a parody of the soundtrack from Disney's Frozen, in 2014, "Uptown Passover", a parody of Mark Ronson's "Uptown Funk", in 2015, and "A Lion King Passover", parodying music from Disney's The Lion King, in 2019. The music video for the latter song garnered more than 1.6 million views on YouTube.

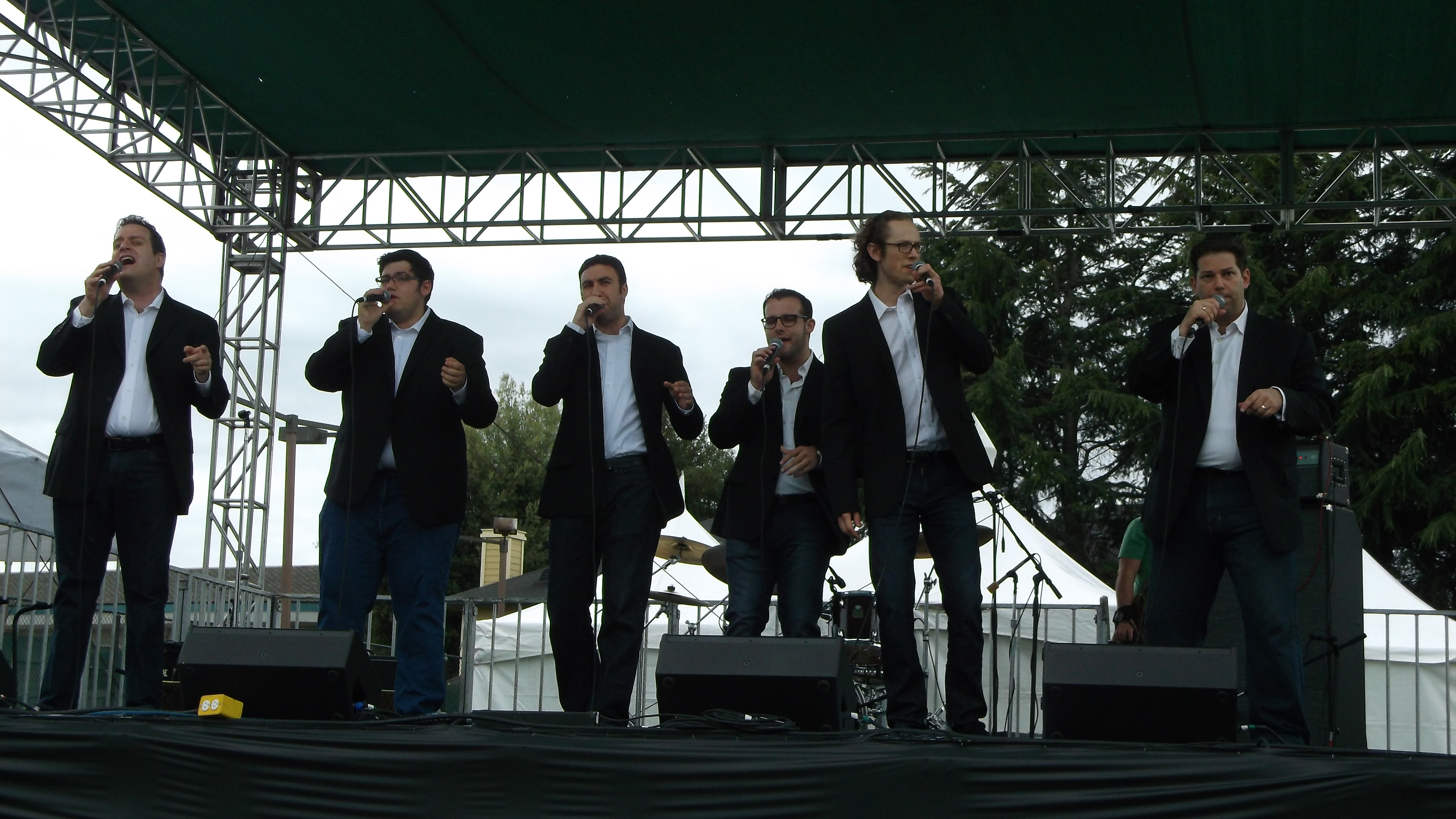
Six13 at Jewish Music Fest in Los Gatos, California

=== Covers ===
Six13 has performed vocal cover versions of "Poker Face" by Lady Gaga, "Heartless" by Kanye West, and "I Gotta Feeling" by The Black Eyed Peas, among others.

=== Original songs ===
While Six13 is best known for its parodies, most of its output is original songs, based on prayers and tunes from the traditional Jewish liturgy. Boxer, the group's main songwriter and arranger, estimates that original compositions constitute six out of every eight songs they perform, and are mainly found on the group's albums.

=== Appearances ===
Six13 performs regularly in the United States, Canada, and Israel, appearing at universities, synagogues, Jewish youth conferences, and private events. They have also performed at music festivals in Israel, Germany, Austria, and Costa Rica.

In 2016 they were invited by President Barack Obama to perform at the White House Hanukkah Party. The group prepared to sing in the foyer for guests who were filing in to the East Room for the reception, but Obama invited them inside to sing for him, the First Lady, and other guests including US Supreme Court Justices Ruth Bader Ginsburg and Sonia Sotomayor. For this occasion, they sang a short selection from "A Hamilton Hanukkah", their parody of music from the Broadway musical Hamilton.

== Musical styles ==
Six13 employs a wide range of musical styles, including pop, rock, hip hop, doo wop, and jazz. Relying solely on vocals, the group achieves the effects of guitar, bass, drums, and electronic music through beatboxing and multiple layering of vocal tracks on its music videos.

== Personnel ==
Mike Boxer is the group's musical director, songwriter, arranger and business manager. As of 2021, the group has a total of eight members, aged 25 to 37, who travel in groups of six for performances. Members are all college graduates, are based in New York City, and have careers outside the group. Mike Boxer, Carl Haber, Lior Melnick, Craig Resmovits, Nathaniel Ribner, Josh Sauer, Jacob Spadaro, and Mordy Weinstein make up the group as of 2021. As of December 2024, the group consisted of Mike Boxer, Eitan Hiller, Lior Melnick, Chaim Moskowitz, Craig Resmovits, Nathaniel Ribner, Josh Sauer, and Mordy Weinstein.

== Honors and awards ==
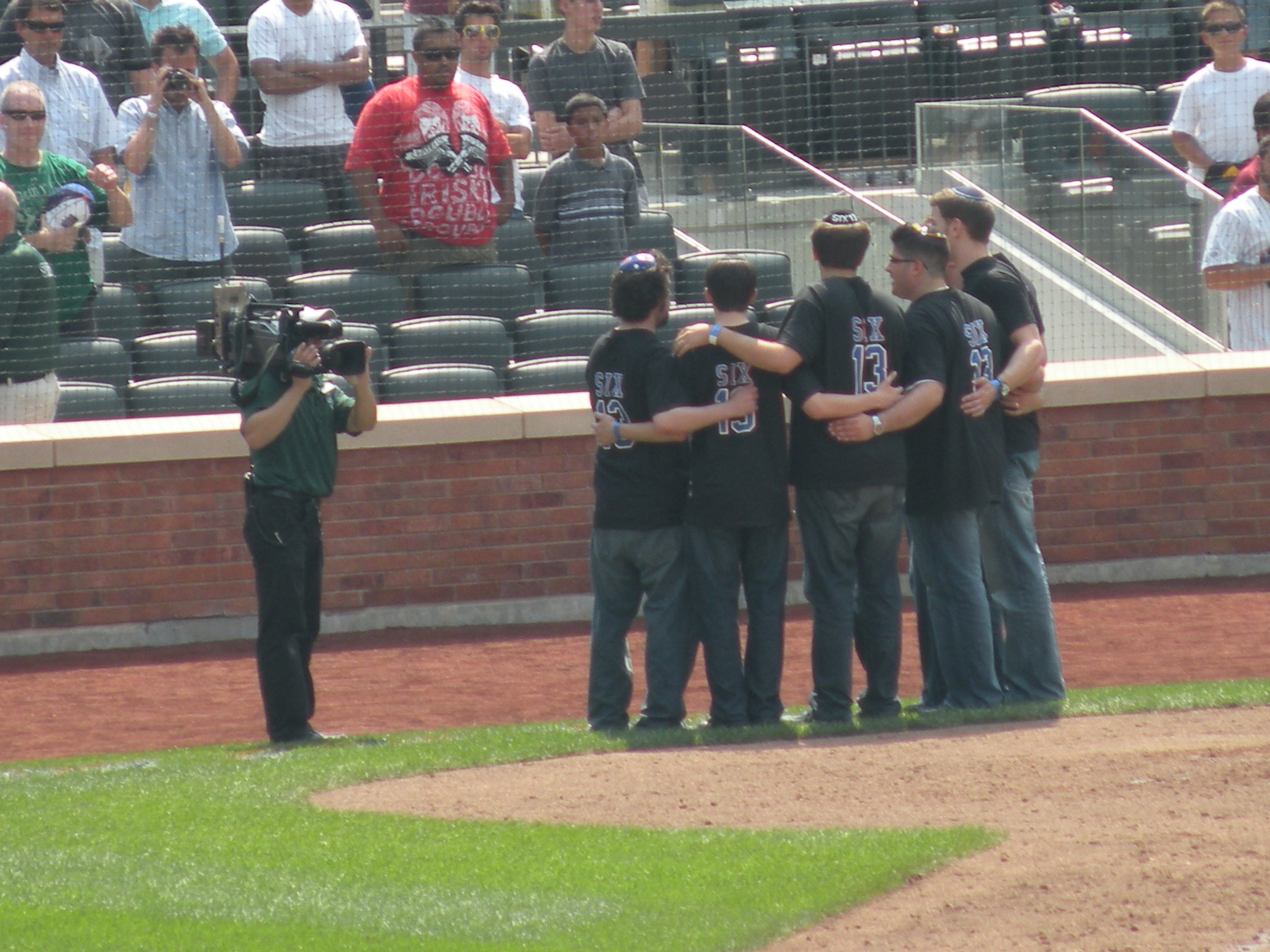
Six13 sings "God Bless America" on Jewish Heritage Day at Citi Field, 2009

Six13 has been invited to participate in Jewish Heritage Day at Shea Stadium/Citi Field for seven consecutive years. The group was chosen as a finalist for three years in a row in the casting process for the NBC a cappella competition The Sing-Off.

Six13's album "Encore" was named a top pick of 2007 by the Recorded A Cappella Review Board, and the album "Yesh Chadash" was a top pick of 2009. The group is regularly nominated for Contemporary A Cappella Recording Awards; it won in the category of Best Humor Song in 2017 for "Watch Me (Spin / Drey Drey)", in 2015 for "Shana Tova", in 2012 for "I Light It", in 2011 for "Tefillin", and in 2009 for "Ne'ilah". Its song "Good Shabbos" won both Best Religious Song and Best Humor Song in 2013, while "D'ror Yikra" was named Best Religious Song in 2008. Six13 has also been awarded by The New York Harmony Sweepstakes in the category of Best Original Song for "Al Hanissim" in 2008, "Shema" in 2013, and "Gam Ki Elech" in 2019.

== Discography ==
- Six13 (2005)
- Encore (2007)
- Yesh Chadash (2008)
- Zmanim (2011)
- Believe (2013)
- Thirteen (2015)
- Blessings / Brachot (2017)
- Lights (2019)
- A Star Wars Chanukah (2019)
