= Lisp (band) =

- Origin: East London, England, UK
- Genres: Trip hop, experimental rock
- Years active: 1995–2001
- Labels: Mind Horizon, London
- Past members: Jonathan Gordon; Jason Hall; Adam Rich; Brad Rubinstein; Paul Willmott

Lisp was an English trip hop band from East London. Formed in 1995, they were signed to Mind Horizon Recordings, a subsidiary of London Records, on which they released their first and only album, Cycles (2000), which saw radio success from its singles "Flatspin" and "Long Way to Climb".

== History ==
Lisp was formed in East London in 1995, with the lineup including former Disco Inferno bassist Paul Willmott on keyboard, vocalist Johnnie Gordon, guitarist Brad Rubinstein, bassist Jason Hall, and drummer Adam Rich.

The band was signed to the London Records subsidiary Mind Horizon Recordings in 1999 by Pete Tong, through which they released their first single, "Flatspin", in September of that year. Their second single, "Long Way to Climb", was even more popular, getting airplay on XFM. In November, the band played a show at the club Scala in King's Cross, London. The full album, Cycles, was released on 17 April 2000.

The group disbanded in 2001, in part because Rubinstein's then-nascent return to Orthodox Jewish faith made it difficult for him to attend shows that fell on religious holidays. Following the breakup, Rubinstein moved to Israel, where he co-founded with rapper Ori Murray the Jewish hip hop/rock group Shtar.

== Musical style ==
Lisp's music combined a rock sound with such additional touches as a string quartet and Paul Willmott's electronic musical instruments. The singles "Flatspin" and "Long Way to Climb" were compared to what AllMusic's Andy Kellman called "completely unrelated bands", such as Massive Attack and Portishead. Another Allmusic writer, Dean Carlson, compared Cycles to "a trip-hop Depeche Mode, or British baggy after a lecture marathon on Schwarzschild geometry" and described the band's musical structures as "ambitious". Live concerts would range from stripped-down acoustic sets to elaborate string sections and visuals.

== Members ==
- Jonathan Gordon - vocals, songwriting
- Brad Rubinstein - guitar, songwriting
- Paul Willmott - keyboards, synthesizers
- Jason Hall - bass guitar
- Adam Rich - drums

== Discography ==
Albums

- Cycles (2000, Mind Horizon)

Singles

- "Flatspin" (1999)
- "Long Way to Climb" (1999, London Records)
