= Gad Elbaz =

Israeli musical artist

Gad Elbaz גד אלבז
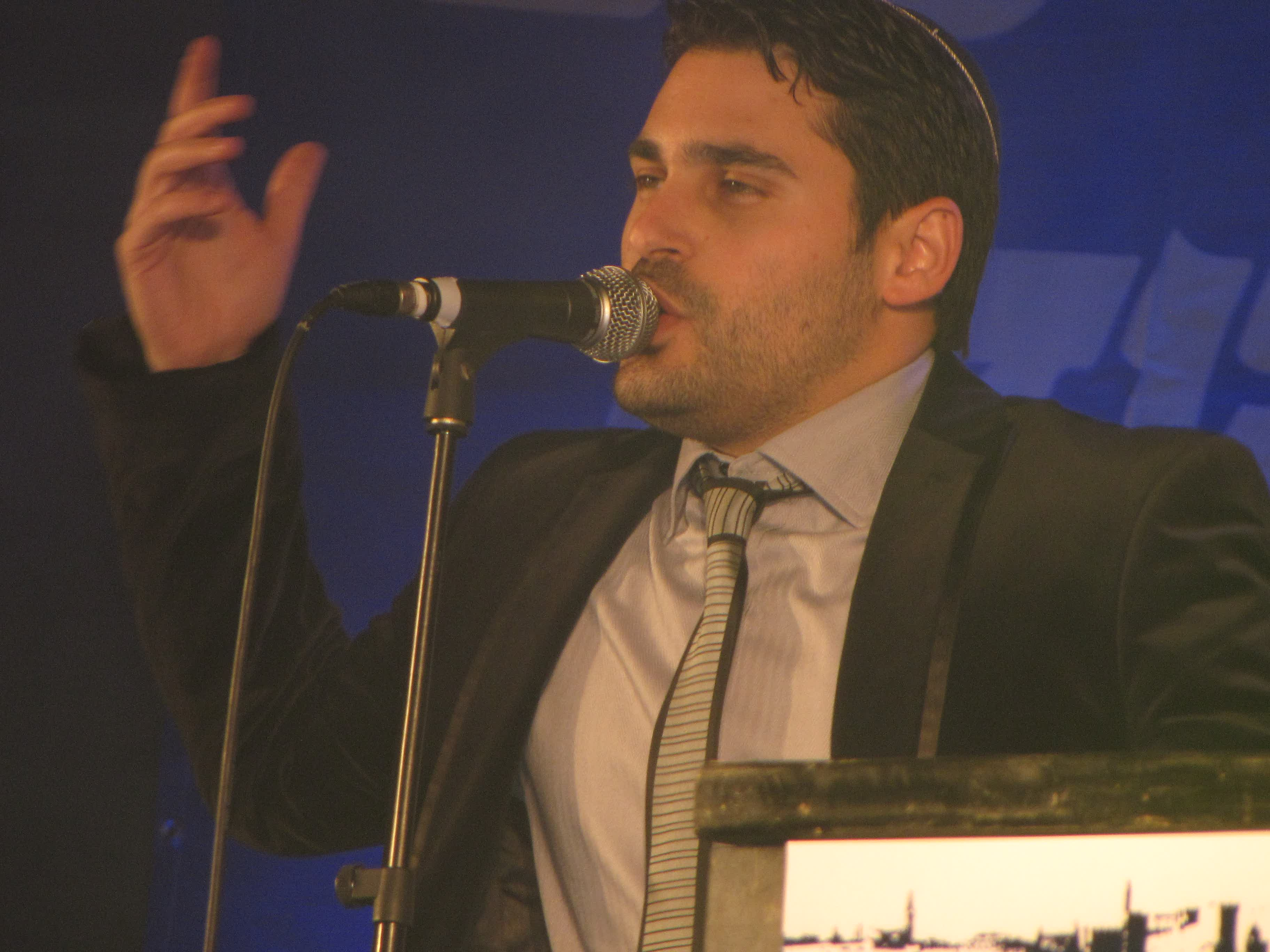

Background information
- Born: Gad Gaston Elbaz; August 20, 1982 (age 43); Rehovot, Israel
- Genres: Jewish music, Eastern music, Mizrahi music, pop, rock
- Instruments: Vocals, beatboxing
- Years active: 1986–present
- Labels: ZOAB Entertainment, Hoshen Entertainment
- Website: www.gadelbaz.com}

Gad Elbaz (Hebrew: גד אלבז) is an Israeli Jewish singer who has gained international success and recorded several albums.

== Biography ==
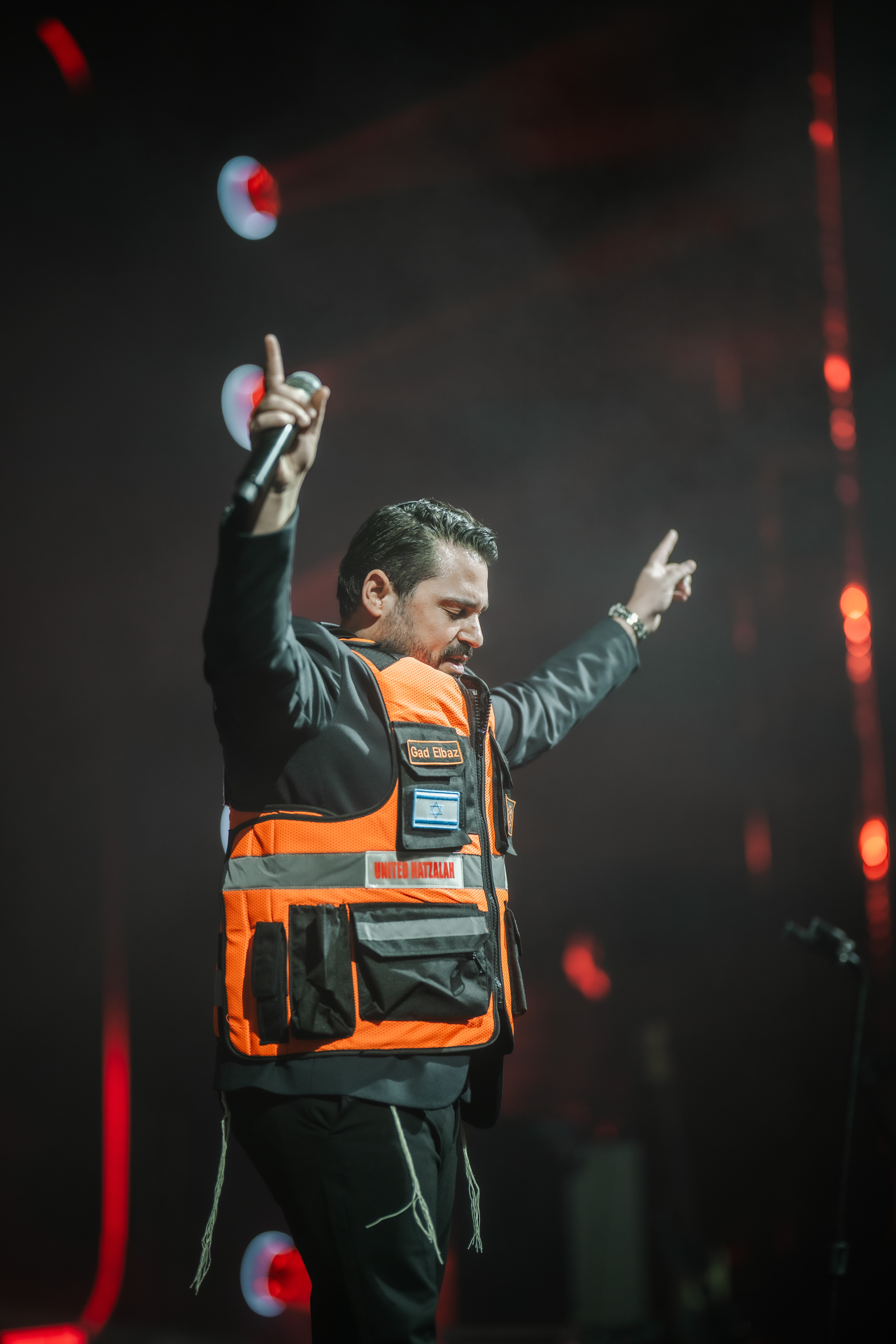
Gad Elbaz at 2024 United Hatzalah concert

Elbaz is of Moroccan Jewish descent. He began to sing and write music at age four. He first appeared with his father Benny Elbaz, an Israeli singer, accompanying him on the song "Father I Love You". Gad is featured on four CDs with his father. When he was 20, he met his wife Moran who happened to be a fan of his. He later broke out as a solo artist recording ten albums of his own: "Walk in a Straight Path" in 1998, "Light at the End of the Tunnel" in 2003, "Meanings" in 2005, "Almost Quiet" in 2006, “Between the Drops” in 2007, "Live at Caesarea (2 CDs)" in 2008, " Words of Spirit" in 2013, “Nigun Umizmor” in 2014, “Ze Hayom” in 2014, and his latest "Lechaim" in 2017. His multi-city world tours to promote his music and message were successful. His Hashem Melech Tour had over 180 shows in 53 cities. His music videos have been regularly shown on Israeli Music 24 station.

In 2017 and 2018, Gad ranked #1 on the list of Most Views on Youtube by an Orthodox Jewish singer.

== Discography ==
=== Albums ===
- 1999: Honest Roads (in Hebrew: לך בדרכים ישרות)
- 2003: Light at the End of the Tunnel (in Hebrew: אור בקצה המנהרה)
- 2004: Meanings (both CD and DVD) (in Hebrew: משמעויות)
- 2006: Almost Quiet (in Hebrew: כמעט שקט)
- 2008: Between the Drops (in Hebrew: בין הטיפות)
- 2013: Words of Spirit (in Hebrew: מילים של רוח)
- 2014: Nigun Umizmor (in Hebrew: ניגון ומזמור)
- 2014: Ze Hayom (in Hebrew: זה היום)
- 2017: L'Chaim

==== Live Performance Albums ====
- 2008: Live at Caesarea (2 CDs) (in Hebrew: הופעה חיה בקיסריה)
- 2018: Live in Kings Theater

=== Singles ===
- 1998: Aba, Otcha Ani Ohev (meaning: "Daddy, I Love You") (at 4-years old, with his father Benny Elbaz)
- 2004: Halayla Zeh Hazman (meaning: "Tonight is the Night"; in Hebrew: הלילה זה הזמן) - ft. Alon De Loco (in Hebrew: אלון דה לוקו)
- 2005: Or (meaning: "Light"; in Hebrew: אור) - (Alon De Loco [in Hebrew: אלון דה לוקו]) featuring Gad Elbaz
- 2008: Mizmor Ledavid (meaning: "A Psalm of David"; in Hebrew: מזמור לדוד)
- 2010: Just a Prayer Away (originally in English)
- 2013: Hashem Melech (meaning: "God is the King"; in Hebrew: "ה' מלך") (The song's melody samples on Khaled's song "C'est la Vie")
- 2013: Open up (Hebrew and English version)
- 2014: Miracles (Al Hanisim)" (feat. Naftali Kalfa and Ari Lesser)
- 2014: Bring Back Our Boys
- 2014: Min Hameitzar (meaning: "From the Straits")
- 2014: Hava Nagila (meaning:"Let us rejoice") - an adaptation of the song with new lyrics
- 2015: Ma Nishtana (meaning: "Why is it Different")
- 2015: Avinu (meaning: "Our Father")
- 2016: Besearaich (meaning: "In Your Gates")
- 2016: Hashem Melech 2.0 (feat. Nissim Black), melody based on that of "C'est la Vie" by Khaled
- 2016: Shirat Hamalachim
- 2016: Rise Again (Betifara) credited to Gabriel Tumbak featuring Gad Elbaz,
- 2016: WeR1 ft. Gad Elbaz, Refael Mirila, Alliel, DeScribe, and Nissim
- 2016: Meefo Lehatchil
- 2017: L'Chaim (feat. Nissim), with melody based on a part of song of Shabbat Deror Yikra
- 2017: Just Like That
- 2017: Even Masu Habonim (feat. Beni Elbaz and Benjamin Elbaz)
- 2017: Even Masu Habonim - Remix (feat. Beni Elbaz, Benjamin Elbaz and Jais BPM)
- 2017: Shine On (feat. The Holocaust Survivor Band)
- 2018: Ana (with Itzik Shamli)
- 2018: Ochi Chernye (feat. Avi Benjamin)
- 2018: Change the World (feat. Dudu Fischer and Saul Dreier)
- 2018: Lo Maocher (with Elchai)
- 2019: Abale
- 2019: Abale - a cappella
- 2019: Lehamshich Leheov
- 2019: Adon Haslichot
- 2019: I Know - of the Cecilia Margules Project
- 2019: Abale - Remix (feat. DJ Aron Kaufman)
- 2019: Shmor - Cecilia Margules Project (feat. Benny Elbaz and Saul Dreier)
- 2019: We Are Rachel's Children - of the Cecilia Margules Project
- 2020: Vearikoti Lachem Bracha (with Roi Harush)
- 2020: Yoter Chazak
- 2020: Mekudeshet (feat. Chaim Shlomo Mayesz)
- 2020: Mimaamakim
- 2020: Oh Jerusalem
- 2020: Healers
- 2020: Shalom Adon Olam
- 2021: Halelu
- 2021: Kol Yachol
- 2021: Ata Shalom
- 2021: Geula
- 2022: Tachzik Oti (feat. Itay Amran)
- 2022: Pray
- 2022: Geula - Remix
- 2022: Achashverosh
- 2022: Purim Crashers (feat. Bodi)
- 2022: Esah Enai (feat. Hebro)
- 2022: Sheyishmor
- 2022: Yavo Hayom (feat. Benny Michaeli)
- 2022: Good Shabbos (feat. DJ Klmn and Jo Messa)
- 2022: Yihiye Li Tov
- 2022: Lenasot (with Moshe Klein)
- 2022: Bat Melech
- 2022: Sheyishmor - Remix
- 2022: Lenasot - Remix (with Moshe Klein)
- 2023: Keshoshana
- 2023: Hu Hamelech (with Nissim Black)
- 2023: Kol Hatfilot (feat. Netanel Israel)
- 2024: Ima Yekara
- 2024: Shabbat Vayinafash
