= Shtar =

Israeli Jewish rap rock band

Shtar שטר
- Origin: Beit Shemesh, Israel
- Genres: Jewish rock, Jewish hip hop, rap rock, alternative hip hop
- Years active: 2006–present
- Labels: Shemesh Music, Shemspeed, 8th Note (Israel), Heatseat
- Members: Ori "M'Ori" Murray; Brad Rubinstein; Dan "Zakki" Issac; Avi Sommers; Tzvi Solomons
- Past members: Alex Lopez-Dias; David Epstein
- Website: shtarmusic.com

Shtar (Imperial Aramaic: שטר, "contract") is an Israeli Jewish rap rock band based in Beit Shemesh. Formed in 2006 by American rapper Ori Murray and English guitarist/songwriter Brad Rubinstein, the band released their debut album, Infinity, in Israel in 2010 and in the United States through Shemspeed Records in 2012. They have received considerable media attention, much of it focused on the contrast between their traditional Jewish dress and modern-sounding music. A second recording, Boss EP, was released through the band's own Heatseat Records in December 2012. In 2015, they were announced as contestants on the Israeli reality singing show HaKokhav HaBa.

== History ==
Founding members Ori Murray and Brad Rubinstein met at the Aish HaTorah yeshiva in Jerusalem, after having led largely non-religious lives. Upon discovering that they both had musical backgrounds they had abandoned in favor of their religious studies (Murray had previously been an MC in Seattle's drum and bass scene, while Rubinstein had been the guitarist and songwriter for a short-lived Essex-based trip hop outfit called Lisp), the two started encouraging each other to return to making music and ultimately formed Shtar in 2006, taking the name from a tractate of Gemara they were learning at the time. Originally a duo, they gradually added a full band to their lineup to be more interesting live.

In May 2010, the band released its debut album Infinity. The band was signed a year later by Shemspeed Records, who re-released the album on March 5, 2012. In October, the band played the Israeli independent music festival InDNegev and gave a Halloween concert at Mike's Place in Tel Aviv. December 5, 2012, saw the independent release of a second Shtar recording, the Boss EP. Shortly afterward, the band announced plans for a second EP, Beauty Queen EP, to be released in early summer 2013, as well as a UK tour the same year.

On April 9, 2014, Shtar released a Prince of Egypt-inspired Passover single called "So Decide". On December 10 of the same year, they released a Hanukkah single, "Lights", through Aish.com.

The band auditioned for the 2015–16 season of the Israeli reality singing competition HaKokhav HaBa, which offers winners a spot in the Eurovision Song Contest. Their audition song was a cover of "In the End" by Linkin Park. They were awarded ninth place, while singer Hovi Star was declared the winner with "Made of Stars".

== Musical style ==
Over the course of their career, Shtar's music has combined hip hop with elements of funk, rock, pop, electronica, and Sephardic music (co-vocalist Dan Isaac comes from a line of Sephardic cantors), with influences including Beck, The Roots, Massive Attack, Mos Def, and Coldplay. Max Elstein Keisler of The Forward described the formula of the songs on Infinity as "a melodic, live-band beat, a smooth vocal hook, usually in Hebrew, and a sophisticated 'smart guy' rapping." In contrast, the Boss EP included more pop and electronica elements, and featured completely English lyrics and less overtly religious themes.

== Band members ==
=== Current members ===
- Ori Murray – MC, lyrics
- Brad Rubinstein – guitar, songwriting, production
- Dan "Zaki" Isaac – vocals
- Avi Sommers – bass guitar
- Tzvi Solomons – drums

=== Past members ===
- Alex Lopez-Dias – bass guitar
- David Epstein – drums

== Discography ==
=== Studio albums ===
- Infinity (2010, 8th Note, Israel; 2012, Shemspeed, U.S.)

=== EPs ===
- Boss EP (2012, Heatseat)

=== Singles ===
- "Modeh (Restoring My Soul)" (2010; Infinity)
- "Infinity" (2010; Infinity)
- "Overload" (2012; Boss EP)
- "So Decide" (2014)
- "Ma Nishtana" (2016)
- "Gone Again" (2016; Boss EP)
- "Ma'oz Tzur" (2016)
- "Echad Mi Yodea" (2017)
