= Matisyahu discography =

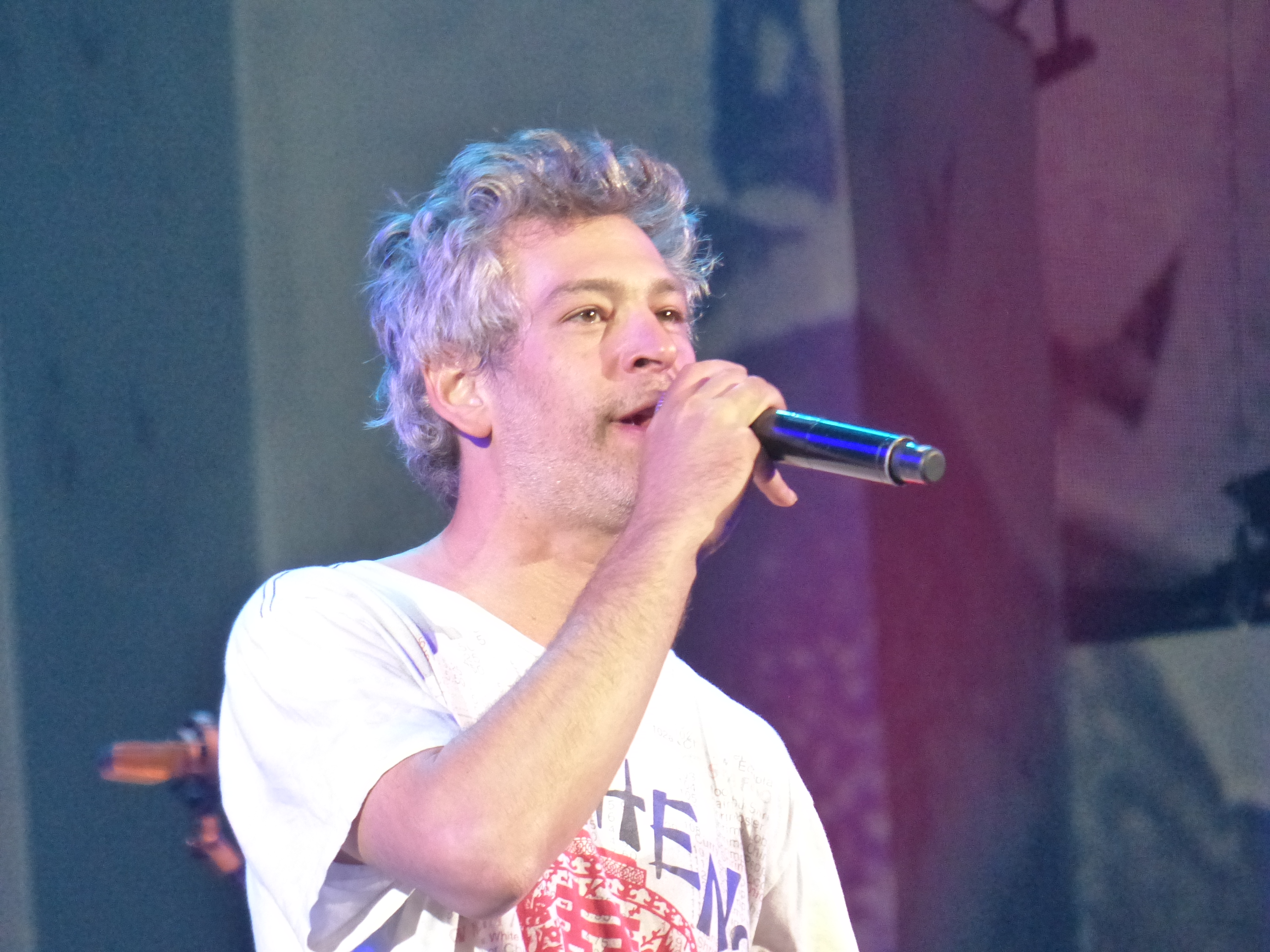
- Studio albums: 7
- EPs: 5
- Live albums: 5
- Compilation albums: 1
- Singles: 20
- Remix albums: 2

The discography of American reggae musician and rapper Matisyahu consists of five studio albums, four live albums, one compilation album, two remix albums, three extended plays and twenty singles.

== Albums ==
=== Studio albums ===
List of studio albums, with selected chart positions and certifications
Title	Album details	Peak chart positions										Certifications
Title	Album details	US	US Rap	US Reg.	AUS	FIN	IRL	JPN	NLD	SWE	UK	Certifications
Shake Off the Dust... Arise	Released: October 12, 2004 (US); Label: JDub; Formats: CD, digital download	—	—	—	—	—	—	—	—	—	—	
Youth	Released: March 7, 2006 (US); Label: JDub, Epic; Formats: CD, LP, DualDisc, digital download	4	3	1	57	35	47	32	48	43	152	RIAA: Gold
Light	Released: August 25, 2009 (US); Label: JDub, Epic; Formats: CD, LP, digital download	19	—	1	—	—	—	143	—	—	—	
Spark Seeker	Released: July 17, 2012 (US); Label: Fallen Sparks; Formats: CD, LP, digital download	19	—	1	—	—	—	—	—	—	—	
Akeda	Released: June 3, 2014 (US); Label: Akeda, Elm City; Formats: CD, LP, digital download	36	4	—	—	—	—	—	—	—	—	
Undercurrent	Released: May 19, 2017; Label: Fallen Sparks, Thirty Tigers; Formats: CD, LP, digital download	—	—	—	—	—	—	—	—	—	—	
Matisyahu	Released: March 25, 2022; Label: Fallen Sparks; Formats: CD, digital download	—	—	—	—	—	—	—	—	—	—	
Ancient Child	Released: 2025; Label: Fallen Sparks; Formats: CD, digital download											
"—" denotes a recording that did not chart or was not released in that territory.

=== Live albums ===
List of live albums, with selected chart positions and certifications
Title	Album details	Peak chart positions					Certifications
Title	Album details	US	US Rap	US Reg.	AUS	NLD	Certifications
Live at Stubb's	Released: April 19, 2005 (US); Label: JDub; Formats: CD, LP, digital download	30	14	1	74	98	RIAA: Gold
Live at Twist & Shout	Released: August 25, 2009 (US); Label: Epic; Formats: CD, digital download	—	—	—	—	—	
Live at Stubb's, Vol. 2	Released: February 1, 2011 (US); Label: Fallen Sparks; Formats: CD, LP, digital download	89	—	2	—	—	
Five7Seven2 Live	Released: July 30, 2013 (US); Formats: digital download	—	—	—	—	—	
Live at Stubb's, Vol. III	Released: October 2, 2015 (US); Label: Fallen Sparks; Formats: CD, digital download	—	—	2	—	—	
"—" denotes a recording that did not chart or was not released in that territory.

=== Compilation albums ===
List of compilation albums, with selected chart positions
Title	Album details	Peak chart positions
Title	Album details	US Reg.
Playlist: The Very Best of Matisyahu	Released: May 10, 2012 (US); Label: Sony; Formats: CD, digital download	7

=== Remix albums ===
List of remix albums, with selected chart positions
Title	Album details	Peak chart positions	
Title	Album details	US	US Reg.
Youth Dub	Released: March 7, 2006 (US); Label: JDub; Formats: CD, LP, digital download	—	—
No Place to Be	Released: December 26, 2006 (US); Label: Epic, Or Music; Formats: CD, DVD	146	–

=== Extended plays ===
List of extended plays, with selected chart positions
Title	Album details	Peak chart positions	
Title	Album details	US Sales	US Reg.
Shattered	Released: October 10, 2008 (US); Label: Epic; Formats: CD, digital download	—	1
Youth EP	Released: August 11, 2009; Label: Epic; Formats: CD, 7" (single for song "Youth")	–	
Miracle	Released: November 21, 2011 (US); Label: Fallen Sparks; Formats:CD, Digital download	5	—
Spark Seeker: Acoustic Sessions	Released: January 29, 2013 (US); Label: Fallen Sparks; Formats: CD, Digital download	—	1
Release the Bound	Released: November 18, 2016 (US); Label: Fallen Sparks/Thirty Tigers; Formats: Digital download	—	2
"—" denotes a recording that did not chart or was not released in that territory.

== Singles ==
=== As lead artist ===
List of singles as lead artist, with selected chart positions and certifications, showing year released and album name
Title	Year	Peak chart positions									Certifications	Album
Title	Year	US	US Alt.	US Latin Pop	US Pop	US Rap	US Reg.	US Rock	ISR	JPN	Certifications	Album
"King Without a Crown"	2005	28	7	34	37	49	1	— (Note: "King Without a Crown" did not enter the Rock Songs chart, but peaked at number 35 on the Rock Digital Songs chart.)	—	—	RIAA: Gold	Youth
"Youth"	2005	— (Note: "Youth" did not enter the Billboard Hot 100, but peaked at number 21 on the Bubbling Under Hot 100 Singles chart, which acts as an extension to the Hot 100.)	19	—	—	—	—	—	—	—		Youth
"Warrior"	2005	—	—	—	—	—	—	—	—	—		Non-album single
"Jerusalem (Out of Darkness Comes Light)"	2006	—	—	—	—	—	24	—	—	—		Youth
"One Day"	2009	85	21	—	35	—	1	38	1	37	RIAA: Gold	Light
"Miracle"	2010	—	—	—	—	—	9	—	—	—		Non-album single
"Sunshine"	2012	—	—	—	—	—	1	—	—	—		Spark Seeker
"Live Like a Warrior"	2012	—	—	—	— (Note: "Live Like a Warrior" did not enter the Pop Songs chart, but peaked at number 35 on the Pop Digital Songs chart.)	—	1	—	—	—		Spark Seeker
"Happy Hanukkah"	2012	—	—	—	—	—	4	—	—	—		Non-album single
"Watch the Walls Melt Down"	2014	—	—	—	—	—	—	—	—	—		Akeda
"Confidence" (featuring Collie Buddz)	2014	—	—	—	—	—	10	—	—	—		Akeda
"Broken Car"	2014	—	—	—	—	—	—	—	—	—		Akeda
"Hard Way"	2014	—	—	—	—	—	—	—	—	—		Akeda
"Surrender"	2014	—	—	—	—	—	—	—	—	—		Akeda
"Love Born"	2016	—	—	—	—	—	—	—	—	—		Non-album single
"—" denotes a recording that did not chart or was not released in that territory.

=== As featured artist ===
List of singles as featured artist, with selected chart positions, showing year released and album name
Title	Year	Peak chart positions					Album
Title	Year	US Sales	US Alt.	AUT	GER	MEX Air.	Album
"Drown in the Now" (The Crystal Method featuring Matisyahu)	2009	26	—	—	—	—	Divided by Night
"Pure Soul" (DeScribe featuring Matisyahu)	2011	—	—	—	—	—	Non-album single
"Dance All Night" (The Dirty Heads featuring Matisyahu)	2012	—	30	—	—	239	Cabin by the Sea
"Believers" (Nosson Zand featuring Matisyahu)	2013	—	—	—	—	—	Believers
"World on Fire" (Moshav featuring Matisyahu)	2013	—	—	—	—	—	New Sun Rising
"Hypnotize" (Cisco Adler featuring Matisyahu)	2014	—	—	—	—	—	Coastin'
"Zuhause" (Adel Tawil featuring Matisyahu)	2014	—	—	6	23	—	Lieder
"Better Off" (Radical Something featuring Matisyahu)	2015	—	—	—	—	—	Summer Of Rad
"—" denotes a recording that did not chart or was not released in that territory.

== Other charted songs ==
List of songs, with selected chart positions, showing year released and album name
Title	Year	Peak chart positions		Album
Title	Year	US Reg.	VEN	Album
"Message in a Bottle"	2006	—	13	No Place to Be
"Fire of Freedom"	2012	25	—	Spark Seeker
"I Believe in Love"	2012	22	—	Spark Seeker
"—" denotes a recording that did not chart or was not released in that territory.
