= Roots Tonic =

2000s Rock Band

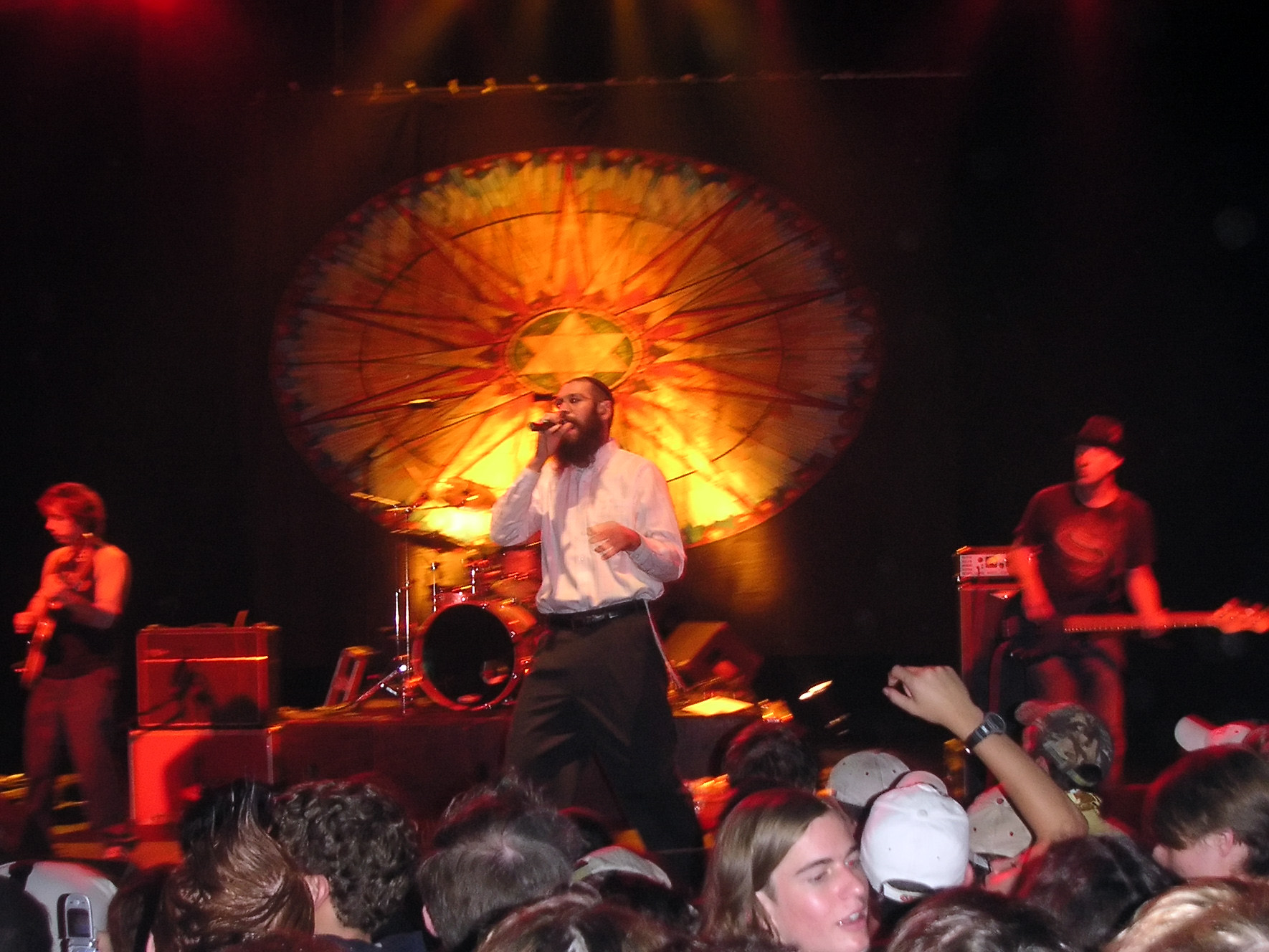
Matisyahu and Roots Tonic

Roots Tonic was the name of the three piece rock-reggae band best known as Matisyahu's backing band during live shows and studio recordings. The band was made up of Aaron Dugan (guitar and sounds), Josh Werner (bass and keyboard, also co-writes songs with Matisyahu), and Jonah David (drums and percussion). They have recorded two studio albums and a live album with Matisyahu, but the name Roots Tonic was first mentioned on the inside cover of Matisyahu's 2006 major label album Youth and its dub version, Youth Dub.

Youth producer Bill Laswell was so impressed with the band that he invited it to record a dub album with him. The result, Roots Tonic meets Bill Laswell, was released in mid-2006 on Reach Out International Records.

In 2007, first Jonah David, and shortly after Josh Werner left Matisyahu's live band, which meant the end of Roots Tonic as well.

In 2009/2010, Dub Trio became Root Tonic's successor to support Matisyahu live on stage.

In 2011, Bill Laswell and Josh Werner produced Lee "Scratch" Perry's studio album "Rise Again"; Aaron Dugan plays guitar on select tracks.

== Album discography ==
=== Solo ===
Date of Release	Title	Label
2006	Roots Tonic meets Bill Laswell	Reach Out International Records

=== with Matisyahu ===
Date of Release	Title	Label	US Billboard Peak	US RIAA Certification
November 1, 2004	Shake Off the Dust...Arise	JDub Records	did not chart	
April 19, 2005	Live at Stubb's (live)	JDub/Or/Epic	30	Gold
March 7, 2006	Youth	JDub/Or/Epic	4	Gold
March 7, 2006	Youth Dub (only partially with Matisyahu)	JDub/Or/Epic	Not yet charted	
December 26, 2006	No Place to Be (CD/DVD)	Sony Music	Not yet charted	
