= Larry S. Miller =

American entrepreneur (born 1957)

- Born: September 4, 1957 (age 69); Boston, Massachusetts
- Occupations: Director of Music Business Program and Clinical Associate Professor at New York University Steinhardt School, Managing Director or Musonomics, entrepreneur, educator, music producer, consultant, advisor, radio personality, voiceover talent, commentator
- Known for: Cofounding early digital music company a2b music and independent record label Or Music, consulting work with AT&T and L.E.K. Consulting, founding consulting firm Musonomics, teaching music business and analytics at NYU, and voiceover and public policy media production.

Larry S. Miller (born September 4, 1957) is an American-born serial entrepreneur, educator, music producer, consultant, and public policy advisor based in New York City. He is currently clinical associate professor of music business at New York University and the leader of Miller and Co., a media and tech consultancy he founded in 2009. He is a frequent commentator on music, copyright, and licensing issues whose views have been featured on CNBC, CNN, FOX News, Good Morning America, The Wall Street Journal, The New York Times, Financial Times, Los Angeles Times, and Billboard.

== Radio ==
Miller began his career in the radio industry, serving as music director for Boston-area station WCAS before joining startup Radio Computing Services (RCS Inc.), where he helped the company grow into a major provider of music-selection software. At RCS, Miller worked with Scott Shannon, who would become the first program director and host of New York City's hit-format station Z100. He convinced Miller to serve as the station's first production manager. Shortly after its launch in 1983, the station's Arbitron ratings placed it last in its market. However, within 73 days, Z100 rose to become the No. 1 radio station in New York. In 1984, Miller joined NBC rock network The Source, where he served as director of affiliate relations and hosted the show The Source Report. He became GM of Sales and Marketing at NBC Radio Entertainment in 1986, then moved to Tribune Company’s smooth-jazz station CD101.9 in 1989, where he was named Creative Director and served as the station’s on-air promo voice.

== Consulting and music tech entrepreneurship ==
After earning his MBA in marketing and finance from Columbia Business School, Miller was recruited by EDS Management Consulting, where he did tech-based strategy work for large music companies and broadcasters. In 1995, the company acquired Chicago-based A.T. Kearney for $628 million, and Miller left soon after to join AT&T's new consulting division, AT&T Solutions.

He soon began working with AT&T Labs, becoming engaged on how to commercialize its audio compression technologies. In 1998, under AT&T Labs, he and Howie Singer cofounded the early digital music distributor a2b music. The company introduced the AAC audio compression technology, currently used by Apple’s iTunes download store. Eighteen months later, Miller, Singer, and 12 other senior managers and technologists from a2b left the company to join Reciprocal, a privately held company specializing in management and distribution of digital music, videos, and software. Miller was named President of the company’s newly created Reciprocal Music division, which provided digital rights management services and products to the online music industry. In 2001, Reciprocal was sold to Microsoft, and Miller left the company.

== Or Music ==
In 2002, Miller cofounded the New York City-based independent record label Or Music with Michael Caplan. The label achieved success in 2003 with the release of Los Lonely Boys’ self-titled debut album, which eventually was certified double platinum by the RIAA and won a Grammy for Best Pop Performance by a Duo or Group with Vocal for its hit single “Heaven." The release was followed by Matisyahu’s Live at Stubb’s, which reached #30 on the Billboard Top 200 and was certified Gold in 2006. The label also released the benefit compilation Por Vida: A Tribute to the Songs of Alejandro Escovedo, which was produced by Miller. Featuring contributions from Lucinda Williams, Steve Earle, Calexico, John Cale, Los Lonely Boys, Cowboy Junkies, Charlie Sexton, Ian Hunter, The Jayhawks, Son Volt, M. Ward, Vic Chesnutt, and more, the album raised money for Hepatitis C awareness and treatment as well as Escovedo’s medical and living expenses. Por Vida was hailed as “an artistic and humanitarian triumph” by The Wall Street Journal.

Or Music was acquired by Sony Music and EMI Music Publishing in 2006.

== Return to consulting ==
After the acquisition of Or Music, Miller was named a senior member of L.E.K. Consulting’s media and entertainment practice. In 2009, he left to found his own advisory firm now known as Musonomics, where he provides strategic counsel and direction to creators, owners, and distributors of music, media, and technology. Clients have included Sony, EMI, ABC, AT&T, Bertelsmann, NBC, NPR, Rodgers & Hammerstein, and Arbitron.

== MediaNet and rights administration ==
In 2012, Miller was named executive vice president and general manager of MediaNet, a company that powers digital music distribution for a variety of online services. His responsibilities included new service innovation in music and media rights management, partner acquisition, and revenue growth. During his time there, the company expanded its offerings to include mechanical rights licensing and administration, teamed with Univision to power Custom Radio stations for the company's Uforia app, and more.

In 2013, Miller left his position at MediaNet to become a full-time faculty member at New York University. He remains with the organization in an advisory role, and restarted his consultancy Miller & Company.

== New York University ==
Miller began his teaching career in 2012, when he became the Entrepreneur-in-Residence at New York University. In this role, he lectured, coached, and mentored students who enrolled in the school's Entrepreneurship in the Music Industry class. In Fall 2013, Miller became a full-time faculty member at NYU, where he teaches courses in the business structure of the music industry, collective licensing and rights administration, music analytics and the capstone course on entrepreneurship, and serves as a clinical associate professor. He was appointed director of the NYU Steinhardt Music Business Program in 2015.

== Voice acting and public policy media production ==
Building on his prior experience as an on-air radio personality, Miller has worked as a voiceover talent for more than 20 years, with experience at NBC, Tribune Broadcasting, Viacom, SiriusXM, and NPR. He received his voiceover training from Peter Rofé, Nancy Wolfson, David Lyerly and Marice Tobias with performance training at Brandeis University and Columbia University. Miller also participates in a variety of public policy activities. Currently, he is involved with Pledge 2 Protect, a coalition of advocates opposing the construction of the East 91st Street Marine Transfer Station in New York City. In August 2013, he produced “Imagine Smarter,” an animated film that explains how the project could threaten the health of those who live near the proposed facility, specifically in regard to children's respiratory health. The video also raises safety and quality of life concerns including vermin, traffic, and odors caused by up to 500 garbage trucks per day, six days per week traveling to and from the facility which bisects Asphalt Green, a recreational facility used by 31,000 children.
