= Live at Stubb's =

Live at Stubb's may refer to:

- Live at Stubb's (Blue October album)
- Live at Stubb's (Matisyahu album)
- Live at Stubb's, Vol. 2 (Matisyahu album)
- Live at Stubb's (Ween album)
