= Larry Miller =

Larry, Laurence or Lawrence Miller may refer to:

== Arts and entertainment ==
- Larry Miller (accordionist) (born 1936), American Cajun accordion builder
- Lawrence Miller (1944–2009), American art director, Best Scenic Design nominee in 1982 at 36th Tony Awards
- Larry Miller (artist) (born 1944), American pioneer in Fluxus mixed media
- Laurence Miller, American art collector, founder in 1984 of Laurence Miller Gallery
- Larry Miller (comedian) (born 1953), American actor, podcaster and columnist
- Larry Miller (guitarist), American rock and avant garde musician active since 1980s

== Business ==
- Larry H. Miller (1944–2009), American automotive retail businessman and sports team owner of Utah Jazz
- Larry Miller (sports executive), American sports apparel and basketball team president, active since 1980s
- Larry S. Miller (born 1957), American entrepreneur
- Larry Miller (born c. 1952), owner of Sit 'n Sleep

== Politics ==
- Lawrence G. Miller (1936–2014), American politician and businessman in Connecticut
- Larry Miller (Tennessee politician) (born 1954), American legislator in Tennessee House of Representatives
- Larry Miller (Canadian politician) (born 1956), member of Canadian House of Commons

== Sports ==
- Larry Miller (baseball) (1937–2018), American pitcher
- Larry Miller (basketball player) (1946–2025), American shooting guard
- Larry Miller (American football) (born 1962), American quarterback
- Larry Miller (athlete) (born 1963), Antiguan Olympic runner
- Lawrie Miller (1923–1996), New Zealand cricketer
