= Live at Stubb's, Vol. 2 =

Live album by Matisyahu
- Released: February 1, 2011
- Venue: Stubb's, Austin, Texas
- Genre: Reggae
- Length: 78:59
- Language: English
- Label: MRI Associated Labels; Fallen Sparks Records, via RED
- Producer: Dub Trio Stu Brooks, Dave Holmes & Joe Tomino

Matisyahu chronology
Light/Live at Twist & Shout (2009)	Live at Stubb's, Vol. 2 (2011)	Spark Seeker (2012)

Matisyahu live chronology
Live at Twist & Shout (2009)	Live at Stubb's, Vol. 2 (2011)	Five7Seven2 Live (2013)

Professional ratings
Review scores
Source	Rating
AllMusic	3.5/5 stars

Live at Stubb's, Vol. 2 is the third live album by Matisyahu. The album is a sequel to his debut live album. It was recorded live at Stubb's in Austin, Texas on August 18, 2010, and mixed by Joel Hamilton.

== Critical reception ==
AllMusic awarded the album 3.5 out of 5 stars, with writer David Jeffries viewing it as a stronger album than the first volume.

== Track listing ==
1. "Kodesh" – 11:03
2. "Time of Your Song" – 4:45
3. "Mist Rising" – 5:32
4. "Darkness Into Light" – 6:13
5. "Youth" – 12:27
6. "I Will Be Light" – 6:39
7. "Two Child One Drop" – 11:26
8. "Open the Gates" – 8:21
9. "One Day" – 7:06
10. "Motivate" – 5:27

== Charts ==
Chart performance for Live at Stubb's, Vol. 2
Chart (2011)	Peak position
US Billboard 200	89
US Independent Albums (Billboard)	9
US Reggae Albums (Billboard)	2
