= Jonah David =

American musician (born 1977)

Jonah David (born October 30, 1977) is a drummer/percussionist who has performed and recorded with a wide variety of musicians including Matisyahu, Costello, Roots Tonic, Josh Werner, Bill Laswell, Braindance, Joshua Nelson, King Django and the Brooklyn Funk Essentials.

== Personal life ==
Born October 30, 1977, Jonah grew up in South Orange, New Jersey, and was introduced to music at an early age by his father. He attended Columbia High School and continued his music education at Rutgers–Newark, The New School for Jazz and Contemporary Music, and Drummers Collective. Jonah also studied at the Mason Gross School of Performing Arts and Musicians Institute.

== Career ==
David started his career at Hopewell Baptist Church in Newark, New Jersey, playing and recording with Joshua Nelson from 1993 to 2005. He began touring extensively with reggae bands in New Jersey and in 2000 toured the US with King Django, and Europe with the Brooklyn Funk Essentials. While at The New School he met Josh Werner and Aaron Dugan to form Roots Tonic in 2004, the original backing band for Matisyahu until 2007. Prior to forming Roots Tonic, Jonah and Josh Werner played together supporting MC's and spoken-word poets at the Nuyorican Poets Cafe as well as break dancers with the band Butta. During this time, Roots Tonic recorded four albums and one live DVD which include two RIAA-certified gold records with Matisyahu: Live At Stubb's and Youth, and one record with Bill Laswell, Roots Tonic Meets Bill Laswell. In February 2010 Jonah enlisted in the United States Navy Music Program and is currently a Petty Officer First Class Musician (MU1). To date, Jonah has been awarded the National Defense medal, Global War on Terrorism medal, and the Navy Pistol Marksmanship ribbon.

== Endorsements ==
David endorses Sabian cymbals, DW drums and hardware, Vic Firth sticks, Evans heads, Audix microphones and Factory Metal percussion.

== See also ==
- Costello (band)
- Roots Tonic
