= Live in Israel =

Live in Israel may refer to:

- Live in Israel, video album Noa (Israeli singer) and The Solis String Quartet
- Live In Israel, jazz CD album by Roberto Ottaviano 2002
- Live in Israel, video album by Avraham Fried 2009
- Live in Israel (Matisyahu video album), packaged with No Place to Be
