= Costello (band) =

American punk/power pop band

Costello is a 4-piece melodic punk/power pop band hailing from Los Angeles, California. Founded in 2003, Costello has become a staple of the west coast punk scene with their hook-laden brand of melodic punk and power pop.

== Debut and L.A.'s punk/rock scene ==
In the summer of 2004, Costello was signed to the nationally distributed Los Angeles indie label High School Records. The following year, they released their debut full-length LP titled Scatterbrain. As a result of their well received debut, the band began to make a name for themselves with their contemporary take on 90's era west coast melodic punk. The lead single, Anything & Everything, garnered heavy rotation on college and university radio stations across the United States.

In 2007, Costello released a second full-length LP entitled In Vino Veritas. The album was generally well received by critics and listeners, and helped further establish the band's signature sound. As one reviewer at thepunksite.com noted, "They are catchy without dumbing it down, energetic without being obnoxious, and just a hell of a lot of fun to listen to. I guess that if in wine we find the truth, in Costello, we find pop-punk greatness."

Costello was chosen, along with a handful of other Los Angeles punk bands, to represent the L.A. punk/rock scene with the contribution of the track 'Live It Up" to the 2008 Crimescene Records compilation CD LA's Most Wanted. Generating highly positive reviews, Costello received honorable mention in thepunksite.com's album review, standing out amongst such well known acts as US Bombs, Buck-O-Nine, The Aggrolites, Throw Rag, and The Briggs.

=== Contributing works ===
The band has also made several contributions to feature films. The songs Life Without Me and Gravity from 2006's Scatterbrain were featured in the independent comedy Outside Sales, which was distributed in the major video market in 2008. 2010 will see the release of another independent comedy via Universal Pictures, "Hole In One", that will feature the songs Anything & Everything and Gravity. Costello has also made several song contributions to sports videos as well. Contributions include the wakeboarding/kiteboarding epic Encore by Liquid Force, and the Dezert People offroad racing videos entries Checkpoint Six, Lucky 7, and Dezert People 8 on which Costello were featured with the likes of Face to Face, Hot Water Music, and Useless ID.

In the summer of 2009, after the departure of drummer Bryan Panzeri, Costello was able to recruit renowned reggae/jazz drummer Jonah David of Matisyahu fame. Jonah's tremendous ability and natural talent provided a rich rhythmic foundation upon which Costello would construct their next studio album.

A third full-length album, entitled Memoirs of a Malcontent was released on June 27, 2011. Recorded in the winter of 2009–2010 in Los Angeles and mixed at Atlas Studios (Chicago, IL) by legendary punk producer Matt Allison, "Memoirs" delivers the same high energy, personal, and hook-laden music for which Costello has become known.

=== Current status ===
Costello in currently hard at work writing and rehearsing songs for their fourth, as yet untitled full-length album (label and release date TBA). The band will return to their roots, enlisting veteran producer/engineer/musician Jussi Tegelman (Havana Black, Guns N. Roses) to co-produce and engineer the record. Tegelman has worked with Costello on two previous albums, "Scatterbrain" and "In Vino Veritas".

== Band members ==
Current
Mitchell Ohlman - Guitar / Vocals
Doug Mitchell - Guitar
Jeff Dahlin - Bass
Christian Nakata - Drums

Past Members
Kendal Byxby - Bass (2003–2006)
Erik Shapiro - Drums (2003–2005)
Justin Laughlin - Drums (2007–2008)
Bryan Panzeri - Drums (2008–2009)
Jonah David - Drums (2009–2012)

== Discography ==
Studio Albums
Scatterbrain - High School Records (2005)
In Vino Veritas - High School Records (2007)
Memoirs of a Malcontent - Celibate Records (2011)

Compilations
LA's Most Wanted - Crimescene Records (2007)

Feature Films
Outside Sales - Secret Identity Productions (2006)

- Life Without Me - Scatterbrain
- Gravity- Scatterbrain

Hole In One - Universal Pictures / Angelic Pictures (2010)

- Anything & Everything - In Vino Veritas
- Gravity - Scatterbrain

Sports Videos
Encore - Liquid Force Entertainment (2006)

- Anything & Everything - Scatterbrain

Lucky 7 - Dezert People (2009)

- Medicine Head - In Vino Veritas
- Decades - In Vino Veritas

Dezert People 8 - Dezert People (2010)

- Wouldn't Change A Thing - Memoirs of a Malcontent (2011)
- The Age Of Ignorance - Memoirs of a Malcontent (2011)
