= Undercurrent (Matisyahu album) =

Studio album by Matisyahu
- Released: May 19, 2017
- Studio: Abe Seiferth Transmitter Park Studio; Stu Brooks 40 Hz Studio, Brooklyn; Studio G, Brooklyn
- Length: 68:41
- Label: Fallen Sparks Records, via RED
- Producer: Matisyahu

Matisyahu chronology
| Release the Bound (2016) | Undercurrent (2017) | Matisyahu (2022) |

Undercurrent is an album by American reggae singer Matisyahu, which was released on May 19, 2017. It is his sixth studio release, and follows 2014's Akeda. Undercurrent was recorded in Brooklyn, New York.

== Background ==
The album utilizes great amounts of jamming; thus, Matthew Miller considers Undercurrent to be a jazz-like record, since it comes from "the same modus of musical exploration, improvisation and conversation." He states that the idea of this album was to emulate the energy of live recordings (through improvisation) that is hard to "pull off" in the studio, and he believes people will feel "its real spirit of freedom" when they listen to it"; similar to how fans tend to prefer live Grateful Dead recordings over their studio albums.

Regarding the music, Miller claims he wanted to create a different kind of album than he usually makes. When discussing the making of Undercurrent, he says that instead of writing and recording in the studio, he wanted to start with a live sound. So he gathered the "greatest musicians [he] could find" who could play this kind of music. He spent nearly two years assembling this band, during which he would improvise and jam on stage (while being recorded) during tours. These jams would then be developed into "somewhat lose forms" before, lastly, recording the vocals.

The songs "Step Out into the Light" and "Back to the Old" were posted as music videos on YouTube on April 25 and May 10, 2017, respectively; the whole album was released a day early (May 18) on YouTube as well.

== Track listing ==
| No. | Title | Length |
|---|---|---|
| 1. | "Step Out into the Light" | 7:48 |
| 2. | "Back to the Old" | 5:49 |
| 3. | "Coming Up Empty" | 6:15 |
| 4. | "BSP: Blue Sky Playground" | 7:59 |
| 5. | "Tell Me" | 10:04 |
| 6. | "Forest of Faith" | 9:56 |
| 7. | "Head Right" | 6:51 |
| 8. | "Driftin'" | 13:59 |

== Personnel ==
Adapted from AllMusic.

- Matisyahu – primary artist, producer
- Stu Brooks – amplifiers, bass, guitar, engineer, Eventide, Moog bass, producer, strings
- Aaron Dugan – Epiphone, guitars, Moog synthesizer, pedals, producer
- Abe Seiferth – engineer
- Masayuki Hirano – instrumentation, Moog synthesizer, producer
- Joe Tomino – cymbals, drums, producer, stick
- Francesco Botero – engineer, mixing engineer
- Joel Hamilton – mixing
- Joe LaPorta – mastering
- Michael Jinno – assistant engineer
- Joseph Bayer – artwork

== Charts ==
The song "Step Out into the Light" peaked at position 48 on Billboard's Mexico Ingles Airplay chart.

| Chart (2017) | Peak position |
|---|---|
| US Current Album Sales (Billboard) | 73 |
| US Independent Albums (Billboard) | 16 |
| US Top Album Sales (Billboard) | 98 |
