= No Place to Be =

No Place To Be

Remix album by Matisyahu
- Released: December 26, 2006
- Recorded: 2006
- Genre: Reggae fusion, hip hop
- Length: 30:32 (CD)
- Label: Epic, Or Music
- Producer: Bill Laswell, Sly & Robbie

Matisyahu chronology
Youth/Youth Dub (2006)	No Place To Be (2006)	Shattered EP (2008)

Singles from No Place To Be
- 1. "Jerusalem (Out of Darkness Comes Light)" Released: 2006

Professional ratings
Review scores
Source	Rating
AllMusic	3.5/5 stars
Pitchfork Media	(4.1/10)

No Place to Be is an album release from Hasidic reggae artist Matisyahu. The album does not contain any previously unreleased songs, but all of the tracks are remixed or rerecorded versions of old songs. It also contains a cover of "Message in a Bottle" by The Police previously available only on Yahoo! Music.

Packaged with the CD is a DVD titled Live in Israel directed by Matt Skerritt, produced by Gregg Gilmore and Calvin Aurand. The DVD features live footage of Matisyahu's first concert in Israel as well as his latest music video, for Jerusalem (Out of Darkness Comes Light).

== Track listing ==
=== CD ===
#	Track title	Album song originally appeared on	Producers	Reconstruction/Remixed
1	Jerusalem (Out of Darkness Comes Light)	Youth	Sly and Robbie	Bill Laswell
2	Chop 'em Down	Shake off the Dust... Arise	Bill Laswell	Bill Laswell
3	Warrior	Shake off the Dust... Arise	Bill Laswell	Bill Laswell
4	Message in a Bottle	Reggatta de Blanc (Cover by Matisyahu on Yahoo! Music)	Sly & Robbie	Bill Laswell
5	Jerusalem (Swisha House Mix)	Youth	Michael Watts	DJ Michael Watts
6	Youth (Small Stars Remix)	Youth	Ad-Rock	Ad-Rock and Jon Weiner
7	Message in a Bottle (dub version)	Reggatta de Blanc (Cover by Matisyahu on Yahoo! Music)	Sly & Robbie	Bill Laswell

=== DVD ===
#	Title	Album song originally appeared on
1	Rastaman Chant	Burnin' (Bob Marley)
2	Lord Raise me Up	Live at Stubb's
3	Dispatch the Troops	Youth
4	Close My Eyes	Shake Off the Dust...Arise
5	Warrior	Shake Off the Dust...Arise
6	Exaltation	Shake Off the Dust...Arise
7	Chop 'em Down	Shake Off the Dust...Arise
8	Late Night in Zion	Youth
9	Ancient Lullaby	Youth
10	King Without a Crown	Youth
11	Heights	Live at Stubb's
12	What I'm Fighting For	Youth
Bonus	Jerusalem (Out of Darkness Comes Light) Music Video	Youth

The DVD also contains 11 interviews with Matisyahu.
