= Happy Hanukkah (song) =

Single by Matisyahu
- Released: November 20, 2012
- Recorded: 2012
- Genre: Reggae
- Label: Fallen Sparks Records
- Producer: Kojak

Matisyahu singles chronology
"Live Like a Warrior" (2012)	"Happy Hanukkah" (2012)	"Believers" (2013)

Music video
- "Happy Hanukkah" on YouTube

"Happy Hanukkah" is a song by Jewish American reggae artist Matisyahu released on November 20, 2012 on Fallen Sparks Records. Released as a charity song, all proceeds from the date of release until end of Hanukkah celebrations on December 16, 2012 would be donated to Hurricane Sandy Relief charity via The Jewish Federations of North America and the Robin Hood Foundation.

Produced by Kojak, "Happy Hanukkah" continues the tradition set by Matisyahu in launching recordings about Hanukkah song, the first being his single "Miracle" in 2010.

== In popular culture ==
On December 4, 2012, Matisyahu performed it live with his band on The Tonight Show with Jay Leno.
