= Jerusalem (Out of Darkness Comes Light) =

Single by Matisyahu

from the album No Place to Be
- Released: 2006
- Genre: Reggae fusion
- Length: 4:00 (Youth version); 3:09 (No Place to Be version)
- Songwriter(s): Ivan Corraliza, Jimmy Douglass, Matthew Wilder, Gregory Prestopino, Matthew Miller

Matisyahu singles chronology
"Youth" (2006)	"Jerusalem (Out of Darkness Comes Light)" (2006)	"One Day" (2008)

Music video
- "Jerusalem" on YouTube

"Jerusalem (Out Of Darkness Comes Light)" is a song by American reggae singer Matisyahu, produced by Jimmy Douglass & The Ill Factor, and first released in 2006 on his major label debut, Youth. A new version was recorded later in 2006 with Sly & Robbie and was released as a digital single on September 19, 2006.

== Overview ==
The song itself is based on Psalm 137, verses 5–6, one of the most well known of the Psalms:

"If I forget you, O Jerusalem, let my right hand wither, let my tongue stick to my palate if I cease to think of you, if I do not keep Jerusalem in memory even at my happiest hour."

The psalm is said to have been written during the Babylonian Exile by Jeremiah expressing the desire of the Israelites to return to Jerusalem.

Matisyahu used the chorus lyrics of Break My Stride by Matthew Wilder as the bridge in this single. There are two versions of the song, the single version which is subtitled (Out of Darkness Comes Light) which is a funky-rock version, and an alternative slower dancehall reggae version.

== Music video ==
On 31 September 2006, Matisyahu released a music video for "Jerusalem (Out of Darkness Comes Light) ". The video uses extensive imagery from the Holocaust and Eastern European Jewish History, and the Civil Rights Movement, as well as using pictures to create a central composite of the Western Wall. This is the first of Matisyahu's videos which does not take place outdoors, and is the first which contains extensive symbolism rather than straightforward scenes. It was directed by Mathew Cullen of Motion Theory.

== Performances ==
After the controversy surrounding Matisyahu's initial disinvitation from the 2015 Rototom Sunsplash festival over pro-Palestinian protests, Matisyahu performed Jerusalem during his set, while several pro-Palestinian activists waved Palestinian flags and heckled Matisyahu.

== Charts ==
Chart (2006)	Peak position
Portuguese Singles Chart	18

== See also ==
- List of songs about Jerusalem
