= Akeda (album) =

Studio album by Matisyahu
- Released: June 3, 2014
- Recorded: 2013–2014
- Genre: Reggae fusion; pop; hip hop; dub; post-rock; electronic
- Label: Elm City Music Universal
- Producer: Stu Brooks

Matisyahu chronology
Five7Seven2 Live (2013)	Akeda (2014)	Live at Stubb's Vol. III (2015)

Matisyahu studio chronology
Spark Seeker: Acoustic Sessions (2013)	Akeda (2014)	Undercurrent (2017)

Akeda is the fifth studio album by American Jewish reggae singer Matisyahu, released on June 3, 2014 via Elm City Music. Akeda is the Hebrew word for "binding" and is typically used to refer to the biblical story of the Binding of Isaac.

== Cover art ==
Matisyahu invited fans to submit artwork for a contest to determine the album's cover. A design by Jimmy Ovadia was chosen by Matisyahu, who said: "It’s not the exact idea I had but it gets at the core of the new album Akeda. A man standing vulnerable and alone against the cosmic night, holding his heart up to God and God doing the same to man, holding his heart, this burning world in his hands and offering it to us. Together walking bringing the sacrifice, making space for each other. Listening and calling out."

== Track listing ==
1. "Reservoir"
2. "Broken Car"
3. "Watch the Walls Melt Down"
4. "Champion"
5. "Built to Survive" (feat. Zion I)
6. "Ayeka (Teach Me to Love)"
7. "Black Heart"
8. "Star on the Rise"
9. "Surrender"
10. "Confidence" (feat. Collie Buddz)
11. "Vow of Silence (Shalom)"
12. "Obstacles"
13. "Hard Way"
14. "Sick for So Long"
15. "Akeda"

== Chart positions ==
Chart	Peak position
US Billboard 200	36
US Top Independent Albums	3
US Top Modern Rock/Alternative Albums	8
US Top Rap Albums	4
US Top Rock Albums	8
