= 2005 Bonnaroo Music Festival =

The 2005 Bonnaroo Music Festival took place from June 10–12, and more than 75,000 people were in attendance. New Line Cinema introduced a twenty-four-hour "cinema tent," showing popular and cult films. Wireless Internet access was provided by Cisco Systems. There was a "comedy tent" featuring Jim Breuer as well as some lesser-known comedians and even daily yoga classes. Like 2004, rain marked each day of the festival. The children's area was provided by Kidz Jam.

== Lineup ==
=== June 9th ===
This Tent

- ALO -Animal Liberation Orchestra
- Perpetual Groove
- Gabby La La
- Signal Path

=== June 10th ===
(artists listed from earliest to latest set times)

- What Stage:
  - Alison Krauss and Union Station
  - The Allman Brothers Band
  - Dave Matthews Band
- Which Stage:
  - Joss Stone
  - Jurassic 5
  - Herbie Hancock's Headhunters 2005
- This Tent:
  - Old Crow Medicine Show
  - Peter Rowan & Crucial Reggae
  - John Prine
  - Bela Fleck's Acoustic Trio
  - Galactic's Crewe De Carnivale
- That Tent:
  - Ollabelle
  - The Gourds
  - Drive-By Truckers
  - Benevento/Russo Duo featuring Mike Gordon
  - Saul Williams
  - The Mars Volta
  - RJD2
- The Other Tent:
  - Josh Ritter
  - Joanna Newsom
  - Madeleine Peyroux
  - Brazilian Girls
  - STS9
- The Bonnaroo Comedy Theatre:
  - Alexandra McHale
  - Fred Armisen
- Cinema Tent:
  - Cowboy Jack Clement's Home Movies
  - Chappelle Show
  - Garden State
  - Friday
  - Monty Python's Life of Brian
  - DiG!
  - Star Wars: Episode II – Attack of the Clones
  - The Bourne Identity
  - Airplane!
  - Team America: World Police
  - Pink Flamingos

=== June 11th ===
(artists listed from earliest to latest set times)

- What Stage:
  - Ozomatli
  - Gov't Mule
  - The Black Crowes
  - Widespread Panic
- Which Stage:
  - 22-20's
  - Kings of Leon
  - Yonder Mountain String Band
  - Jack Johnson
  - Trey Anastasio
- This Tent:
  - Assembly of Dust
  - Mouse on Mars
  - Particle
  - Keller Williams (WMD's)
  - Béla Fleck Acoustic Trio
  - Karl Denson's Tiny Universe
- That Tent:
  - The Frames
  - M. Ward
  - Rilo Kiley
  - Iron & Wine
  - The Perceptionists
  - De La Soul
- The Other Tent:
  - Tea Leaf Green
  - Blue Merle
  - Xavier Rudd
  - O.A.R.
  - Ray Lamontagne
  - The Secret Machines
  - DJ Krush
- The Bonnaroo Comedy Theatre:
  - Mark Eddie
  - Mike Birbiglia
  - Godfrey
  - Jim Breuer
  - Pete Correale
  - Mark Eddie
  - Vic Henley
- Blue Room Café:
  - Alexandra Scott
  - Brandi Carlile
  - Brett Dennen
  - Dishwater Blonde
  - Jim Lauderdale
  - Jodie Manross
  - Mic Harrison
  - Mile 8
  - Old Union
  - Outformation
  - Trent Dabbs
  - Will Hoge
- Cinema Tent:
  - Family Guy
  - Napoleon Dynamite
  - Caddyshack
  - Stella
  - Coming to America
  - Mike Tyson vs. Kevin McBride
  - Minority Report
  - Kill Bill: Volume 1
  - Friday the 13th

=== June 12th ===
(artists listed from earliest to latest set times)

- What Stage:
  - Toots and the Maytals
  - Bob Weir and RatDog
  - The Word
  - Widespread Panic
- Which Stage:
  - Umphrey's McGee
  - My Morning Jacket
  - Modest Mouse
- This Tent:
  - Matisyahu
  - Citizen Cope
  - John Butler Trio
  - Earl Scruggs and Friends
- That Tent:
  - Amos Lee
  - Heartless Bastards
  - Kermit Ruffins and the Barbeque Swingers
- The Other Tent:
  - Dr. Dog
  - Keren Ann
  - Lake Trout
  - Donna the Buffalo
- Cinema Tent:
  - South Park: Bigger, Longer & Uncut
  - Raising Arizona
  - Austin Powers: The Spy Who Shagged Me
  - Beanland: Rising From the Riverbed
  - Bill Cosby: Himself
  - 2005 NBA Finals Game Two

== Superjam ==
(Core band members only, guests not included)

Herbie Hancock (keyboard), Pino Palladino (bass), Ahmir “Questlove” Thompson (drums), Lionel Loueke (guitar)
