= Spark Seeker =

Album by Matisyahu

Studio album by Matisyahu
- Released: July 17, 2012
- Recorded: 2011–2012
- Genre: Pop; hip-hop; electronic; reggae fusion
- Length: 55:31
- Label: Fallen Sparks Records, via RED
- Producer: Kool Kojak

Matisyahu chronology
Live at Stubb's, Vol. 2 (2011)	Spark Seeker (2012)	Spark Seeker: Acoustic Sessions (2013)

Matisyahu studio album chronology
Light (2009)	Spark Seeker (2012)	Akeda (2014)

Singles from Spark Seeker
- 1. ""Sunshine"" Released: 2012; 2. ""Live Like A Warrior""

Professional ratings
Review scores
Source	Rating
Allmusic	3.5/5 stars
Sputnikmusic	3.5/5 stars
Consequence of Sound	3.5/5 stars

Spark Seeker is an album by American reggae singer Matisyahu (Matthew Miller), which was released on July 17, 2012. It is his fourth studio release, and follows 2009's Light. Spark Seeker debuted at #19 on the Billboard 200 with first week sales of 16,000. It debuted at #1 on the Billboard Reggae Chart. The album was recorded in Los Angeles, California, and Tel Aviv, Israel. Miller considers Spark Seeker to be his attempt at a pop album.

The vinyl LP version of the record was pressed at United Record Pressing in Nashville, TN.

== Cover art ==
The cover for Spark Seeker is a picture of a girl who was found in the Judean Desert, taken by Mary Margaret Chambliss, the wife of Matisyahu's agent. Yossi Belkin, the graphic designer behind the cover art, claimed that "the girl was happy and had a sparkle in her eye," to which Miller claimed "that's it, she is the spark seeker." Belkin claims that she gave the album a "pure, fresh, and young feel," and that after going through "dozens of drafts," this one was the "most iconic," Belkin considers this cover to be his proudest work, as of August 1, 2012. Belkin also designed the cover for Matisyahu's 2011's EP The Miracle.

It appears the girl is from a nomadic Muslim Bedouin family.

== Track listing ==
No.	Title	Length
1.	"Crossroads" (feat. J. Ralph)	5:02
2.	"Sunshine"	3:33
3.	"Searchin"	4:18
4.	"Buffalo Soldier" (feat. Shyne)	4:31
5.	"Fire of Freedom"	4:29
6.	"Bal Shem Tov"	5:05
7.	"I Believe In Love"	4:16
8.	"Breathe Easy"	5:01
9.	"Summer Wind"	1:52
10.	"Live Like a Warrior"	3:54
11.	"Tel Aviv'n"	4:52
12.	"King Crown of Judah" (feat. Shyne and Ravin Kahalani)	4:02
13.	"Shine on You"	4:36

== Personnel ==
- Matisyahu - vocals
- Ravid Kahalani - vocals on "King Crown of Judah"
- Kool Kojak - production
- Jack Knight - songwriting, production, background vocals
- J. Ralph - vocals on "Crossroads"
- Shyne - vocals on "Buffalo Soldier" and "King Crown of Judah"
- Rabbi Hagay Batzri - vocals, vocals (background)
- Noa Neve - vocals on "summer Wind"
- Destani Wolf - vocals on "Crossroads" and "Live like a Warrior"

== Charts ==
Chart (2012)	Peak position
U.S. The Billboard 200	19
U.S. Top Digital Albums	7
U.S. Top Independent Albums	3
U.S. Top Reggae Albums	1

== Spark Seeker: Acoustic Sessions ==
Spark Seeker: Acoustic Sessions

EP by Matisyahu
- Released: January 29, 2013
- Recorded: 2012
- Genre: Pop, reggae, hip-hop, acoustic
- Label: Fallen Sparks

Matisyahu chronology
Spark Seeker (2012)	Spark Seeker: Acoustic Sessions (2013)	Five7Seven2 Live (2013)

Matisyahu EP chronology
Miracle (2011)	Spark Seeker: Acoustic Sessions (2013)	Release the Bound (2016)

On January 29, 2013, Matisyahu released Spark Seeker: Acoustic Sessions, a six-song EP that features acoustic versions of songs from Spark Seeker. The iTunes versions includes an exclusive seventh track, "Silence."

=== Track listing ===
No.	Title	Length
1.	"Crossroads"	4:31
2.	"Live Like a Warrior"	3:21
3.	"Sunshine"	4:24
4.	"Searchin"	2:55
5.	"Bal Shem Tov"	3:47
6.	"I Believe in Love"	5:28
7.	"Silence" (iTunes exclusive)	6:08
