= King Without a Crown (Matisyahu song) =

Single by Matisyahu

from the album Youth
- Released: 2005
- Recorded: 2004
- Genre: Reggae, alternative, reggae fusion
- Length: 4:48 (Live at Stubb's version); 3:42 (Youth version)
- Label: JDub
- Songwriters: Josh Werner, Matisyahu Miller
- Producers: Michael Caplan, Angelo Montrone, Jacob Harris

Matisyahu singles chronology
"King Without a Crown" (2005)	"Youth" (2006)

"King Without a Crown" is a song by American musician Matisyahu. It was released in 2005 as the lead single to his second studio album Youth.

A live version of the song from Matisyahu's album Live at Stubb's, recorded in Austin, Texas, was released as a radio single. In 2006, it hit No. 28 on the Billboard Hot 100 and No. 7 on the Alternative Airplay chart, making it Matisyahu's biggest hit of his career.

== Background ==
"King Without a Crown" originally appeared on Matisyahu's 2004 debut album Shake Off the Dust... Arise, but was re-recorded for his second album Youth.

The song was also remixed by Mike D of the Beastie Boys.

"King Without a Crown" was played in the 2007 film Knocked Up.

== Chart performance ==
=== Weekly charts ===
Chart (2005–06)	Peak position
U.S. Billboard Hot 100	28
U.S. Billboard Alternative Airplay	7
U.S. Billboard Pop Songs	37

=== Year-end charts ===
Chart (2006)	Position
US Alternative Songs (Billboard)	25

== Release history ==
Release dates and formats for "King Without a Crown"
Region	Date	Format	Label(s)	Ref.
United States	February 7, 2006	Mainstream airplay	Epic	
