= Sit 'n Sleep =

American mattress store chain

Sit 'n Sleep, Inc.
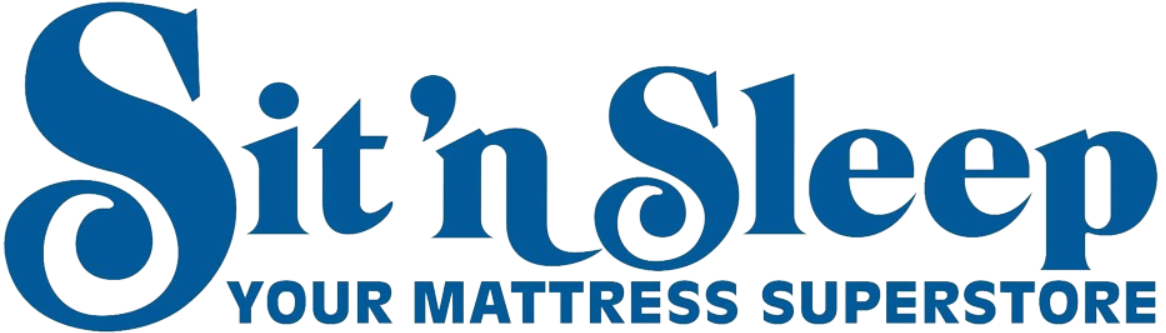
- Company type: Private
- Founded: 1980
- Founders: Larry Miller; Phil Miller
- Headquarters: Gardena, California
- Number of locations: 36 (2024)
- Area served: Southern California
- Key people: Larry Miller (CEO); Nelson Bercier (president)
- Revenue: ▲US$130M (2023)
- Owner: Larry Miller
- Number of employees: 220 (2023)
- Website: www.sitnsleep.com

Sit 'n Sleep is an American mattress store chain based in Gardena, California. As of 2024, it has 36 locations, all in Southern California. It is one of the largest independent mattress retailers in the United States and is also known for its extensive advertising.

== History ==
Larry Miller, one of the co-founders of the company and the face of the brand, grew up in West Los Angeles. He had many odd jobs as a teenager and helped his dad, Phil, at his convertible bed store in Culver City. In 1971, the Millers traveled to Tokyo. They saw a futon and wanted to find a manufacturer in California to make them. Futons became popular in the 1980s, so the Millers, father and son, opened their first store in 1980 in Culver City. It was originally known as Rivera Convertible Sofas and in its first year of business, it made US$200,000.

However, the futon trend quickly faded, and the store struggled. In 1982, Phil's friend, a radio station manager, suggested that, to up business, they buy an ad on the station for $25 per spot. This worked and business started slowly climbing again. It experienced its first burst of popularity in the early 1990s, when it placed ads on The Howard Stern Show and television, doubling its profits. As the company grew, Larry wanted to expand the stores' range, but Phil did not, resulting in Larry buying the company out in 1996. The late 2000s brought a great loss in revenue for the company, as there was a large sales reduction in the mattress industry. Sit 'n Sleep's revenue fell from US$99M in 2006 to US$79M in 2008.

== Advertising ==
The company has placed advertisements since 1982. Many of the advertisements feature Lary Miller and his imaginary accountant Irwin, inspired by his childhood friend and the company's actual accountant. Some of his famous quotes are "Sit 'n Sleep will beat anyone's advertised price or your mattress is freeee!" and "You're killing me, Larry!"

The company was sued in 2017 in a class action lawsuit alleging that the "mattress is free" advertisement is misleading because no other companies sell the same products. It also said that the mattresses are 9% smaller than the industry standard.

== Philanthropy ==
In 2015, Sit 'n Sleep partnered with Tempur-Pedic to donate over 250 mattresses to fire departments in Southern California as a part of Fire Prevention Week. They had previously donated 140 mattresses in 2013.
