= Light (Matisyahu album) =

2009 album by Matisyahu

Studio album by Matisyahu
- Released: August 25, 2009
- Recorded: 2007–2009
- Studios: SeeSquared Studios (New York); Germano Studios (New York); Shabby Road Studios (Los Angeles); Anchor Studios (Kingston, Jamaica); MixStar Studios (Virginia Beach)
- Genres: Reggae fusion; hip hop; alternative rock
- Length: 46:20
- Labels: Epic; JDub Records; Or Music
- Producer: David Kahne/Benji Madden/Joel Madden/Stephen McGregor/Dave McCracken/Josh Mayer/The Smeezingtons/Sly & Robbie

Matisyahu chronology
Youth EP (2009)	Light (2009)	Live at Twist & Shout (2009)

Matisyahu studio album chronology
Youth (2006)	Light (2009)	Spark Seeker (2012)

Singles from Light
- 1. "One Day" Released: June 23, 2009

Light is the third studio album by reggae singer Matisyahu, released on August 25, 2009, by Epic and JDub Records. It's his second major label release following Youth released three years previously. Light was highly successful in the reggae world, holding the top spot on the Billboard Reggae Albums chart for 34 weeks.

== Album delay ==
Matisyahu had been working on his third album for nearly two years, making it the longest time he has ever spent making a record. The follow-up to Youth had been delayed several times before its release. First scheduled for early 2008, Light was pushed back numerous times because Matisyahu continued to tour off and on since the release of Youth. The new album's release date was set for April 21, 2009, but on March 3, the release date was pushed back to May 13, 2009. Then, once again, he pushed the release back, this time to Summer 2009, ostensibly because Matisyahu decided to record more new songs. That date had already passed, and in a message from Matisyahu on Twitter the album is due to release on August 25. On May 27, Matisyahu's Facebook page stated that the album was going to come out on August 25. On June 23 Light was made available for preorder on iTunes, with the single "One Day," a last minute addition to the album, available for download at the same time. Eventually, the official release date of August 25 was settled on. His third album finds him still creating the jam-band sound that made him popular, while shedding some light on his versatility. The theme of 'light' certainly ties the lyrical material together. On January 2, 2010, a remix to "One Day" surfaced which featured Akon.

== Promotion ==
The songs "Smash Lies," "So Hi So Lo," "Two Child One Drop," and "I Will Be Light" also appeared on Shattered EP. The song "One Day" was featured on the video game NBA 2K10

== Critical reception ==
Professional ratings
Aggregate scores
Source	Rating
Metacritic	53/100
Review scores
Source	Rating
AllMusic	4/5 stars
The A.V. Club	C−
The Guardian	3/5 stars
NME	2/5 stars
Rolling Stone	2.5/5 stars
Slant Magazine	2.5/5 stars
Spin	3/5 stars

Light was met with "mixed or average" reviews from critics. At Metacritic, which assigns a weighted average rating out of 100 to reviews from mainstream publications, this release received an average score of 53 based on 15 reviews.

AllMusic's David Jeffries saw the album as already better than Youth thanks to David Kahne being able to deliver on Matisyahu's worldview mysticism and spiritual musicianship, concluding that "[W]hether using his voice as a whisper or as a giant call across nations, the depth of feeling comes through brilliantly, and if the musical soundscape isn't familiar, the empowering and sincere lyrics most definitely are. Add Kahne's instantly accessible production and Light is not only a welcome surprise, but an album that matches his debut." Mikael Wood, writing for Spin, said that "No longer content to be the world's foremost Hasidic reggae star — what an ingrate! — Matisyahu expands his sound […] punching up his earnest ruminations on faith and inspiration with sleek hip-hop beats and shiny pop-rock guitars." Chris Martins of The A.V. Club commended Matisyahu for scaling back on the "fake patois" delivery and "outdated P.O.D.-style metal-dub" that brought down Youth but felt he "carries the curse of burying his true brilliance in too much pop schlock." Rolling Stone's Christian Hoard found Matisyahu more professional throughout the record by incorporating various soundscapes but felt he gets "dragged into earnest tedium by good-natured platitudes ("I must find a road that leads where nobody goes") and hippie-soul moments". Matthew Cole of Slant Magazine gave Matisyahu credit for pushing reggae conventions by exploring other genres but felt he lacked insightful ideas beyond "generic New Age sloganeering" and was hampered by the "stylistic shifts and production gimmicks" from his collaborators, saying that "Light ends up with exciting moments, but few memorable songs." He later highlighted "Silence" for being "an affecting closer" that conveys "genuine reflection", concluding that: "If he could match that level of focus and sincerity in his more energetic cuts, Matisyahu could have a great album on his hands."

== Track listing ==
Light track listing
No.	Title	Writer(s)	Length
1.	"Smash Lies"	Matthew Miller; David Kahne; Stephen McGregor	3:35
2.	"We Will Walk"	Kahne; Miller; Aaron Dugan; Ephraim Rosenstein	3:23
3.	"One Day"	Miller; Ari Levine; Philip Lawrence; Bruno Mars	3:27
4.	"Escape"	Miller; Kahne; Rosenstein; S. Brooks	3:27
5.	"So Hi So Lo"	Miller; Kahne; Dugan; Rosenstein	3:42
6.	"I Will Be Light"	Miller; Kahne; Rosenstein; Trevor Hall	3:35
7.	"For You"	Miller; Dave McCracken	3:29
8.	"On Nature"	Miller; Kahne; Hall; Rosenstein	3:45
9.	"Motivate"	Miller; Kahne; McGregor	4:21
10.	"Struggla"	Miller; Kahne; Jah Dan; Adam Deitch; Eric Krasno; Barrington Levy	3:46
11.	"Darkness into Light"	Miller; Jay E; Benji Madden; Joel Madden	2:54
12.	"Thunder"	Miller; Kahne; Dugan	2:55
13.	"Silence"	Miller; Kahne; Hall	4:11

iTunes bonus track version
No.	Title	Length
14.	"One Day" (featuring Akon)	3:40
15.	"Temple"	4:22
16.	"Drown in the Now"
17.	"7 Beggars"	4:51

Bonus track on Israeli release
No.	Title	Length
14.	"Two Child One Drop"

Bonus track on Argentinean release
No.	Title	Length
14.	"One Day" (featuring Fidel Nadal)

== Personnel ==
Credits adapted from the album's liner notes.

Vocals

- Peter Gayle – answer vocals (6)
- Chevaughn Clayton – answer vocals (6)
- Michael Harris – answer vocals (6)
- Carl Scharschmidt – answer vocals (6)
- Trevor Hall – answer vocals (6)
- J'Quan Hawkes – boys choir (8)
- Joshua Thomas – boys choir (8)
- Shane Loftus – boys choir (8)
- Jonathan Bornstein – boys choir (8)
- Aaron Harewood – boys choir (8)
- Stephen Bozier – boys choir (8)
- Brent Feola – boys choir (8)
- Anthony Salvaggio – boys choir (8)

Instrumentation

- David Kahne – guitars (1, 11), bass (4, 8, 11, 12), keys (4–6, 8–13)
- Aaron Dugan – guitars (2, 4–6, 10, 12)
- Trevor Hall – guitars (6, 8, 13)
- Piamenta – guitars (9)
- Jeremy Harding – guitars, bass (9)
- Eric Krasno – guitars, bass (10)
- Jay E – guitars (11)
- Reeve Carney – guitars (11)
- Norwood Fisher – bass (2, 5)
- Stu "Bassie" Brooks – bass (4)
- Robert "Robbie" Shakespeare – bass (6)
- Stephen McGregor – keys (1, 9), live drums (9)
- Adam Deitch – keys, live drums (9)
- Shawn Pelton – live drums (8, 11)
- Lowell "Sly" Dunbar – live drums (6)
- Shalom Mor – Tar (1)
- Jerry "Gerald" Dixon – bagpipes (8)

Production

- David Kahne – engineering (1, 2, 4–6, 8–12), mixing (4, 6, 8–12), programming (1, 2, 4, 5, 6, 8–13)
- Jay E – engineering, programming (11)
- Serban Ghenea – mixing (1, 2, 5, 11)
- Manny Marroquin – mixing (3, 7)

Artwork

- Jason Falk, Lindsay Morse – art direction
- Beau Grealy – photography

== Charts ==
Chart performance for Light
Chart (2009)	Peak position
Australian Hitseekers Albums (ARIA)	2
Canadian Albums (Nielsen SoundScan)	56
Japanese Albums (Oricon)	143
US Billboard 200	19
US Indie Store Album Sales (Billboard)	4
US Reggae Albums (Billboard)	1
US Top Alternative Albums (Billboard)	6
US Top Rock Albums (Billboard)	8
