= Josh Werner =

- Origin: Milwaukee, Wisconsin, US
- Genres: Dub, experimental rock, hip hop, jazz, avant-garde
- Occupations: Musician, producer, songwriter
- Instruments: Bass, double bass, vocals, guitar, piano, organ, keyboards
- Years active: 1999–2013
- Formerly of: Higgins Waterproof Black Magic Band; Helio Parallax; Living Days; CocoRosie; Matisyahu; Roots Tonic

Josh Werner (born September 17, 1974) is an American bassist, producer, composer and songwriter.

== Life and career ==
Werner grew up in Milwaukee, WI. He works in a variety of styles, most notably reggae, experimental rock, hip hop and jazz.

He was a private student of Richard Davis. In 1996, he moved to New York city to attend the New School of Jazz and contemporary music program.

Werner has worked with, Lee “Scratch” Perry, Cibo Matto, Robert Glasper, Holly Miranda, Wu Tang Clan, Marc Ribot, Vacationer, Ghostface Killah, Dave Eggar, Vybz Kartel, Jay Rodriguez, The Alchemist, Popcaan, Tunde Adebimpe, CocoRosie, The RZA, Sinkane, Sly and Robbie, Matisyahu, Tim K, and is a frequent collaborator of noted American bassist / producer Bill Laswell.

He is a member of Higgins Waterproof Black Magic Band (which includes TV on the Radio singer Tunde Adebimpe, Alex Holden and Ryan Sawyer) Dark romantic pop group Living Days and Sci fi dub noir project Helio parallax.

He frequently tours and records with Avant Garde Freak Folk act CocoRosie.

Werner was a co-writer and bassist of the Certified Gold RIAA albums Matisyahu (Live at Stubb's) and the Grammy nominated Matisyahu (Youth album) along with original backing band Roots Tonic.

== Solo Releases ==
Solo Releases:

Josh Werner: Bass (To be Released) 2018 (MOD Technologies)

JD Werner: Station of Lost 2016 (Beyond Science)
