= Shattered (EP) =

Shattered EP

EP by Matisyahu
- Released: October 14, 2008
- Genre: Reggae
- Length: 16:42
- Label: Epic
- Producer: Matisyahu

Matisyahu chronology
No Place to Be (2006)	Shattered EP (2008)	Light/Live at Twist & Shout (2009)

Professional ratings
Review scores
Source	Rating
Chart Attack	3/5 stars

Shattered EP is an EP by Orthodox Jewish reggae singer Matisyahu.

== Track listing ==
1. "Smash Lies" – 3:24
2. "So Hi So Lo" – 3:41
3. "Two Child One Drop" – 6:02
4. "I Will Be Light" – 3:35

== Charts ==
Chart (2008)	Peak position
US Reggae Albums (Billboard)	1
