= Stu Brooks =

Canadian musician

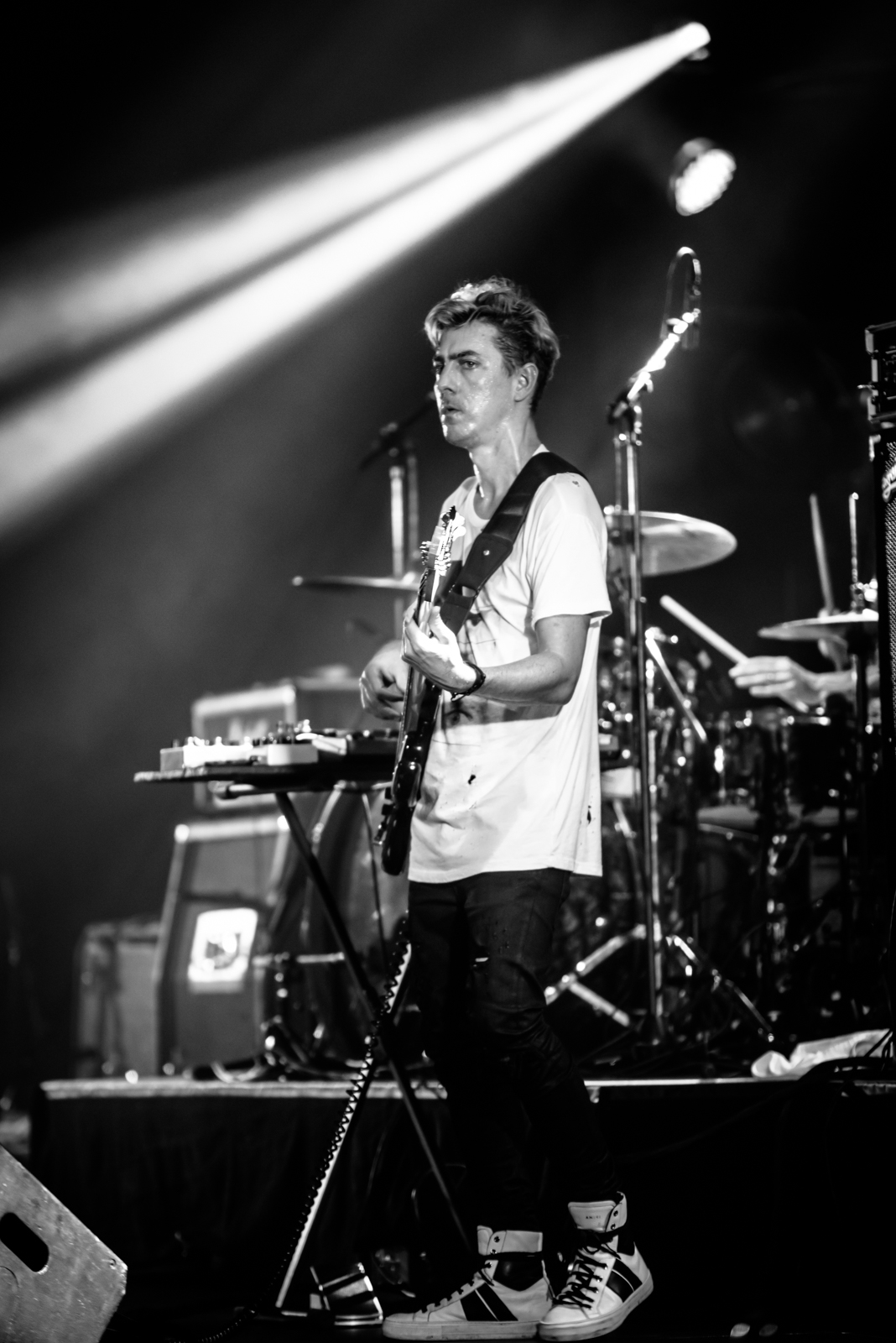
Stu Brooks at the Moers Festival in 2017

Stu Brooks (also known as Stu "Bassie" Brooks) (born July 7, 1978) is a Canadian bassist, composer, and producer. He is a co-founder of the band Dub Trio.

He is known for playing and recording with various artists and music bands, including Saturday Night Live Band, Lady Gaga, Mike Patton, and Nine Inch Nails.

== Career ==
Stu Brooks was born in Canada and later relocated to Brooklyn, New York.

He has worked with artists such as G-Unit, Pretty Lights, Mike Patton, Lady Gaga, Lauryn Hill, 50 Cent, Meshell Ndegeocello, Mobb Deep, Mary J. Blige, Collie Buddz, Slick Rick, Eric Krasno, Mark Guiliana, Adam Deitch, and Tupac Shakur (posthumously).

He appeared on Pretty Lights’ 2013 Grammy-nominated “A Color Map Of The Sun,” “So Seductive featuring 50 Cent” with 50 Cent, and Tony Yayo's Platinum-certified “Thoughts of a Predicate Felon.”

Since 2009, he has been working with Matisyahu. They created four albums together and went on tour. In 2014, Stu Brooks co-wrote and produced Matisyahu's studio album, "Akeda."

In the summer of 2015, Brooks toured as a stage performer with Dr. John.

Brooks also performed at "Coachella" in 2022 as Danny Elfman's bassist.

Brooks made his debut performing with Nine Inch Nails at the start of their 2026 Peel It Back Tour in New Orleans, LA on February 5, 2026.

== Discography ==
Stu Brooks has created music with Dub Trio and worked on projects and albums with Matisyahu, G-Unit, and others in genres ranging between hip-hop, rap, and metal.

=== Dub Trio ===
- Sixes and Sevens/VCO Dub (2013).
- IV (2011).
- III EP (2010).
- Another Sound is Dying (2008).
- Cool Out and CoExist (2007).
- ROIR (Reachout International Records) Essential Dub compilation (2007).
- New Heavy (2006).
- Exploring the Dangers of (2004).

=== Matisyahu ===
- Akeda (2014).
- Miracle EP (2011).
- Live at Stubb's, Vol. 2 (2010).
- The Disney Reggae Club.
- Light (2009).
- Instant Karma: The Amnesty International Campaign to Save Darfur (2007).

=== G-Unit ===
==== 50 Cent ====
- Interscope Records Presents Club Bangers (2006).
- Get Rich or Die Tryin': Music from and Inspired by the Motion Picture (2005).

==== Mobb Deep ====
- Blood Money (2006).

==== Lloyd Banks ====
- Rotten Apple (2006).

==== Tony Yayo ====
- Thoughts of a Predicate Felon (2004).

=== Tupac Shakur ===
- Pac's Life (2006).

=== Pretty Lights ===
- A Color Map of the Sun (2013)).

=== DJ Z-Trip ===
- All Pro (2007) with Gift of Gab (rapper).

=== Peeping Tom ===
- Peeping Tom (2006).

=== Ekundayo ===
- Ekundayo (2011).

=== Soulive ===
- Reminisce (2009).

=== Candiria ===
- Toying with the Insanities Vol. 1 (2009).

=== Mark Guiliana ===
- My Life Starts Now (2014).

=== Meshell Ndegeocello ===
- Comet Come To Me - Dub Trio Remix (2014).

=== Redman ===
- Reggie (2010).
