= Youth Dub =

Remix album by Matisyahu
- Released: March 7, 2006
- Recorded: 2005
- Genre: Dub
- Length: 50:10
- Label: Epic, JDub Records

Matisyahu chronology
Youth (2006)	Youth Dub (2006)	No Place to Be (2006)

Youth Dub is a bonus disc released in conjunction with Matisyahu's second studio album Youth. Both discs were released on March 7, 2006. Youth Dub is included with some copies of Youth and is available as a limited edition, stand-alone album. Producer Bill Laswell made a King Tubby style dub remix of Youth, adding effects and bringing to the fore the music of the backing band Roots Tonic rather than Matisyahu's vocals. Laswell was so impressed with the band that he invited them back into his studio and teamed up for an all-instrumental dub album, Roots Tonic meets Bill Laswell.

The cover artwork is a papercut designed by artist Dena Levie.

== Track listing ==
1. "Youth Dub"
2. "Fire & Dub"
3. "Spark Seekers"
4. "Dub Warrior"
5. "WP Dub"
6. "Daughters Dub"
7. "One Woman"
8. "Fire of Heaven Dub"
9. "Chop 'Em Down Dub"
10. "Nigun"
