= One Day (Matisyahu song) =

Single by Matisyahu

from the album Light
- Released: April 29, 2008
- Recorded: September–October 2007
- Genre: Reggae fusion, hip hop
- Length: 3:27 (Album Version); 3:40 (Pop Edit feat. Akon); 3:28 (World Cup Edit feat. Nameless)
- Label: Epic; JDub; Or Music
- Songwriters: Bruno Mars; Ari Levine; Matthew Miller; Philip Lawrence
- Producer: The Smeezingtons

Matisyahu singles chronology
"Jerusalem (Out of the Darkness Comes Light)" (2006)	"One Day" (2008)	"Miracle" (2010)

"One Day" is a song performed by American reggae singer Matisyahu, first released in 2008, his first single since "Jerusalem (Out of the Darkness Comes Light)". The song was also included as a last-minute addition to Matisyahu's album Light. The song expresses a hope for an end to violence, and a prayer for a new era of peace and understanding. It appeared on the Modern Rock Chart at number 21 and at number 38 on the US Rock Chart; also in March 2010 it debuted on the Billboard Hot 100 at number 90 and reached number 85.

In an interview with Spinner, Matisyahu told them: "'One Day' is the song I've been wanting to make since I started my career. It is an anthem of hope with a big beat, the kind of song that makes you bob your head and open your heart at the same time."

== Remix ==
The official remix for the song features Akon and was released to radio stations in May 2008. A second remix featuring Infected Mushroom was released in July 2008.

There is a version of the song featured on Listen Up! The Official 2010 FIFA World Cup Album, featuring Nameless.

== Uses in other media ==
- The song was sung by group Emblem3 on The XFactor USA, October 31, 2012, a cover version also featured on their album Nothing to Lose in 2013.
- The song was used extensively as the theme song for NBC's Countdown to the 2010 Winter Olympics campaign.
- The song was used at the end of the first trailer of the film Waiting for "Superman"
- The song was used briefly in Tom Brokaw's Bridging the Divide.
- On June 4, 2011, Palestinian mixed martial artist Ramsey Nijem used the song as his entrance music for his fight against Tony Ferguson in keeping with the song's universal message of peace and understanding.
- The song was included in NBA 2K10.
- The song plays when Annie arrives in Israel in the third season of Covert Affairs.
- The song was used for Life Vest Inside's Kindness Boomerang, a short film featuring good works and kindness.
- The song was used by SportTV on its coverage of the 2010 FIFA World Cup.
- The Maccabeats made an a cappella cover of the song in 2010. Matisyahu performed it with them at the March for Israel on November 14, 2023, inserting the Shema Yisrael prayer into the song.
- In the second season of The Voice of the Philippines, reggae singer Kokoi Baldo sang his own rendition of the song and all four coaches turned for him; he chose Sarah Geronimo.
- In the first season of Asia's Got Talent, Filipino shadow play group El Gamma Penumbra used this song for their semifinals performance.

== Music video ==
The music video shows a number of people hanging posters of Matisyahu on the street. On the posters, live action are seen, performing the song.

== Charts ==
Chart (2008–10)	Peak position
Israel International Airplay (Media Forest)	1
US Billboard Hot 100	85
US Billboard Alternative Songs	21
US Billboard Pop Songs	35
US Billboard Rock Songs	38
Japan Hot 100	37

== See also ==
- List of anti-war songs
