= Shake Off the Dust... Arise =

Studio album by Matisyahu
- Released: October 12, 2004
- Recorded: 12 Tribe Sound
- Genre: Reggae
- Length: 63:39
- Label: JDub Records
- Producer: Daniel Seliger; Alon Cohan

Matisyahu chronology
Shake Off the Dust... Arise (2004)	Live at Stubb's (2005)

Matisyahu studio chronology
Shake Off the Dust.. Arise (2004)	Youth (2006)

Professional ratings
Review scores
Source	Rating
Allmusic	4/5 stars
Sputnikmusic	4/5 stars

Shake Off the Dust... Arise is the first album by Matisyahu, was released on October 28, 2004, by JDub Records. It fell out of print following his move to Epic Records and remained a collector's item until it was remastered and reissued in October 2010, temporarily sold exclusively through his official website.

The album's name comes from the Hebrew liturgical poem "Lekhah Dodi" which is sung by most Jewish denominations in order to welcome the holy Sabbath, which in the poem is referred to as a bride.

== Track listing ==
1. "Chop 'em Down" – 5:45
2. "Tzama L'Chol Nafshi (Psalm 63:2-3)" – 1:50
3. "Got No Water" – 5:54
4. "King Without a Crown" – 5:19
5. "Interlude" – 0:54
6. "Father in the Forest" – 4:59
7. "Interlude" – 0:17
8. "Aish Tamid" – 6:48
9. "Short Nigun" – 1:46
10. "Candle" – 6:22
11. "Close My Eyes" – 4:55
12. "Interlude" – 0:17
13. "Exaltation" – 5:04
14. "Refuge" – 3:28
15. "Interlude" – 0:23
16. "Warrior" – 7:23
17. "Outro" – 2:15

== Reissue ==
In 2010, the album was remastered and reissued with a new cover with a detailed pencil portrait of Matisyahu (real name: Matthew Miller), drawn by Diane Russell, overlaid on a Star of David.

== Personnel ==
- Matisyahu Miller – vocals
- Aaron Dugan – guitar (tracks 3, 8 & 11)
- Josh Werner – bass guitar, keyboards, steel-string guitar (tracks 10 & 14)
- Jonah David – drums (tracks 1, 3, 8, 10 & 11), percussion (tracks 4)
- Marlon "Moshe" Sobol – melodica (tracks 3 & 8)
- Yerachmiel Altizio – guitar (tracks 1, 4, 6 & 16)
- Alon Cohan – drums (tracks 9 & 16), percussion (tracks 2, 3 & 13)
- Rea Mochiach – drums (tracks 4 & 5)
- Tom Mochiach – guitar (tracks 3, 4 & 10)
- Lior Rachmany – guitar (tracks 13)
- Pieter Woudt – trumpet (tracks 1, 2, 3, 4, 9 & 16)
- Rabbi Wircberg – spoken voice (tracks 5 & 15)
- Rabbi Goldberg – spoken voice (tracks 17)

Produced and arranged by Alon Cohen Recorded and mixed by Alon Cohen
