= Michael Caplan (music executive) =

American music executive

- Born: March 22, 1956
- Occupation: Music executive
- Years active: 1981–present
- Organization(s): Or Music, One Haven Music, Elm City Music
- Notable work: Matisyahu, The Allman Brothers Band, Ginuwine and Keb' Mo'

Michael Caplan (born March 22, 1956) is a music executive, who has worked for Sony Music Entertainment and Or Music, and signed artists such as Matisyahu, The Allman Brothers Band, Ginuwine, Keb' Mo', and Firehouse. Caplan attended Clark University and graduated in 1978 with a degree in Psychology. He started his career working for Morris Levy, and then spent over 25 years at Sony, ending as a Senior Vice President for A&R. His artists have sold over 30 million records.
