= Matisyahu =

American musician

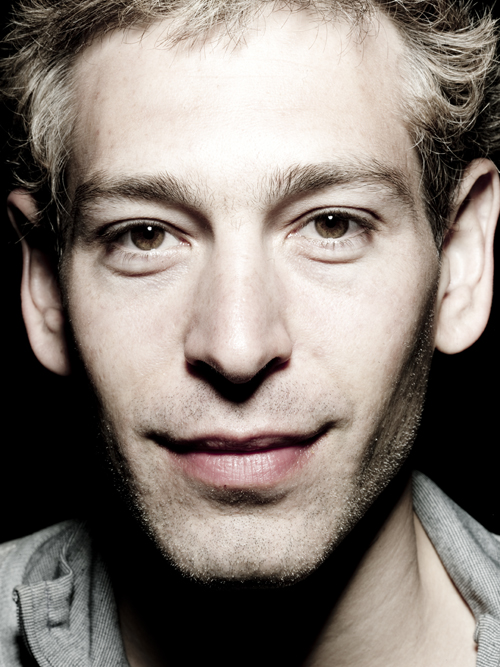
- Matisyahu in 2012

Background information
- Born: Matthew Paul Miller; June 30, 1979 (age 47); West Chester, Pennsylvania, U.S.
- Origin: White Plains, New York, U.S.
- Genres: Reggae; hip hop; alternative hip hop; alternative rock
- Occupations: Singer; rapper
- Instruments: Vocals; beatboxing
- Years active: 2000–present
- Labels: Thirty Tigers; The Orchard; Epic; Fallen Sparks; Greensleeves Records; JDub; Sony BMG
- Website: matisyahuworld.com

Signature
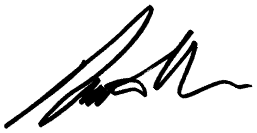

Matthew Paul Miller (born June 30, 1979), known by his stage name Matisyahu (/ˌmɑːtɪsˈjɑːhuː/; מתתיהו), is an American singer, rapper, beatboxer, and musician.

Known for blending spiritual themes with reggae, rock and hip hop beatboxing sounds, Matisyahu's 2005 single "King Without a Crown" was a Top 40 hit in the United States. Since 2004, he has released seven studio albums as well as five live albums, two remix CDs and two DVDs featuring live concerts. Throughout his career, Matisyahu has worked with Bill Laswell and reggae producers Sly & Robbie and Kool Kojak. He has also appeared as an actor in films.

== Early life ==
Matthew Paul Miller was born on June 30, 1979, in West Chester, Pennsylvania. His family eventually settled in White Plains, New York. He was brought up a Reconstructionist Jew and attended Hebrew school at Bet Am Shalom, a synagogue in White Plains. He spent much of his childhood learning the tenets of Judaism, but by the time he was a teenager, Miller began to rebel against his upbringing.

In autumn 1995, Miller attended a two-month program at the Alexander Muss High School in Hod Hasharon, Israel. During the program's first month, he was restricted to staying on campus for disciplinary reasons. He became more interested in Judaism and started to identify more as a Jew. After he finished Muss, he returned to New York. He started taking drugs and dropped out of White Plains Senior High School on the first day of his senior year, becoming a self-professed "Phish-head", taking hallucinogens and following the rock band Phish on tour. At one Phish concert, Matisyahu dropped acid for the first time, an experience he recounted in 2016 "changed my life." A stint in a rehabilitation center in upstate New York followed.

Miller then attended a wilderness expedition school for teenagers in Bend, Oregon, where he completed high school. "It was not necessarily for drug rehabilitation, but that was part of the reason I was out there," he explained to The Forward in 2008. In Oregon, he identified himself as "Matt, the Jewish rapper kid from New York." Miller has contrasted this time in Oregon to his life in New York City. "I was suddenly the token Jew. This was now my search for my own identity, and part of Judaism feeling more important and relevant to me." After being exposed to reggae and hip hop at the school, he began playing open mic sets.

He returned to New York, began taking classes on Jewish spirituality at The New School, and started developing his reggae style, spending hours in his room, writing and practicing to the accompaniment of hip-hop tapes. At the same time, he started going to The Carlebach Shul, an Orthodox Jewish synagogue on the Upper West Side of Manhattan and bought a prayer book and prayer shawl. He began attending religious services every Sabbath at the synagogue and started to wear a yarmulke (head covering) and tzitzit (a fringed undergarment). One morning after getting drunk the night before, Matisyahu encountered Rabbi Dave Korn of the Chabad House at NYU, later moving into Korn's house to study Torah all day.

By November 2001, Miller identified as a member of the Chabad-Lubavitch movement and moved to Crown Heights in early 2002. He delved into Hasidus and removed himself from popular culture.

== Career ==
Miller performed for over a year as MC Truth in Bend, Oregon. In 2004, after having signed with JDub Records, he released his first album, Shake Off the Dust... Arise, under the name Matisyahu. At Bonnaroo 2005, Trey Anastasio of the band Phish invited Matisyahu for a guest spot on his set. Matisyahu also opened for a few Dave Matthews Band shows during their mid-2006 tour, including guesting on the song "Everyday" at the June 14, 2006, Darien Lake show. Matisyahu's second release, Live at Stubb's, was recorded in Austin, Texas, and produced for Or Music by Angelo Montrone. It was distributed to Or Music by Sony/RED, and later upstreamed to Sony/Epic.

In 2005 and 2006, Matisyahu toured extensively in the U.S., Canada, and Europe. He made a number of stops in Israel, including a performance as the supporting act for Sting in June 2006. The live version of the song "King Without a Crown" broke into the Modern Rock Top 10 in 2006. The song was also included on Matisyahu's second album, Youth, which was produced by Bill Laswell and released on March 7, 2006; it features minor contributions by pop producers Jimmy Douglass and the Ill Factor. On March 16, Youth was Billboard magazine's number-one digital album. In 2006, Matisyahu once again appeared at Bonnaroo, this time performing a solo set. In late 2006, he released No Place to Be, a remix album featuring re-recordings and remixes of songs from his three earlier albums, as well as a cover of "Message in a Bottle" by the Police (written by Sting).

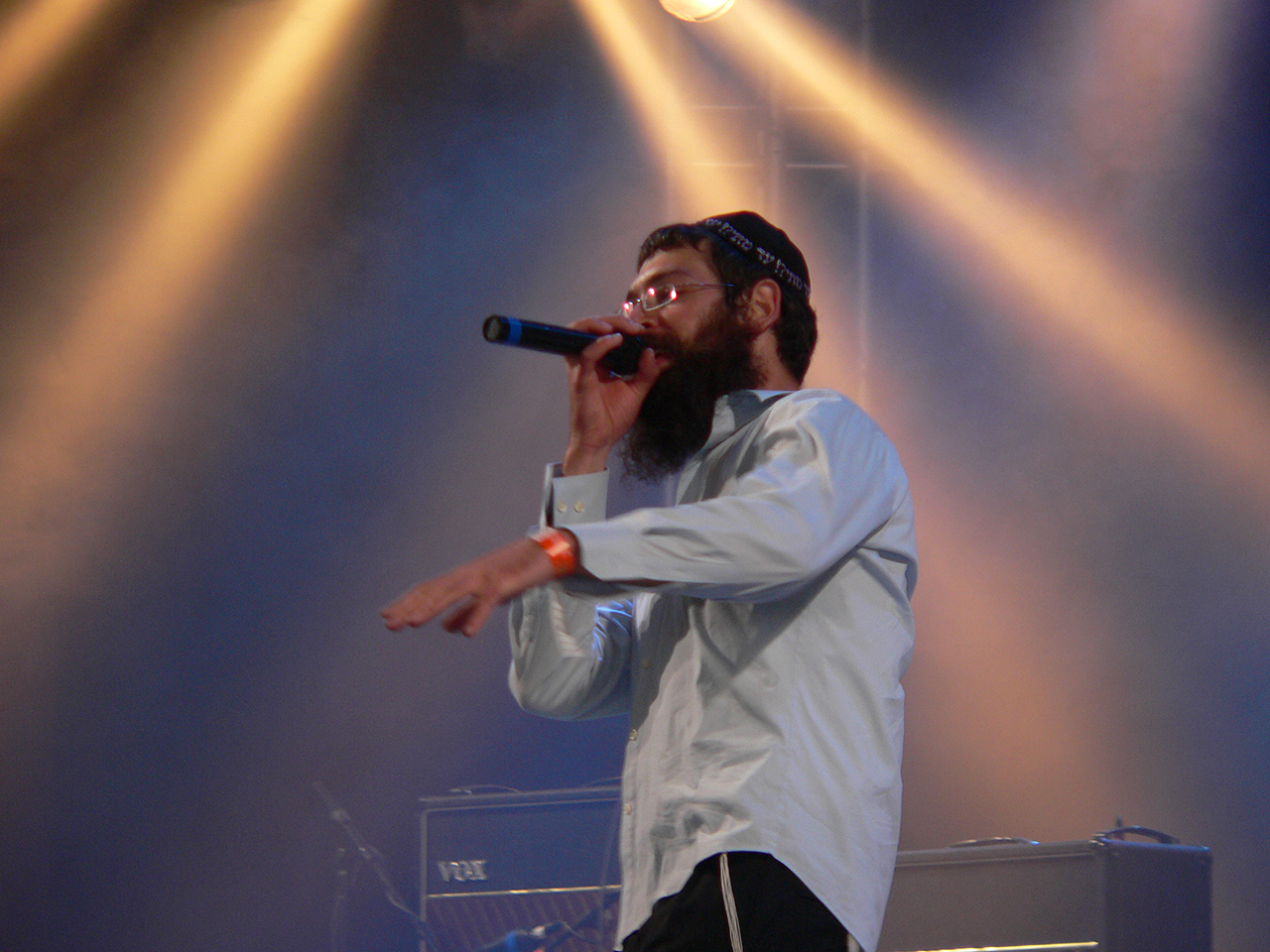
Matisyahu performing in 2006

On March 1, 2006, right before the release of Youth, he informed JDub that he no longer needed its management services. He has since been represented by former Capitol Records president Gary Gersh. JDub claimed the artist had three years remaining on a four-year management contract. JDub managed his act, but was not his record label.

Since his debut, Matisyahu has received positive reviews from both rock and reggae outlets. In 2006, he was named as Top Reggae Artist by Billboard as well as being named a spokesperson for Kenneth Cole. In 2006, Esquire magazine awarded Matisyahu the "Most Lovable Oddball" award in their "Esky" Music Awards, calling him "the most intriguing reggae artist in the world."

At the 2007 Slamdance Film Festival, the film Unsettled, in which Matisyahu appears, won the Grand Jury Prize for Best Documentary Feature. While attending the festival, he performed in an impromptu concert at the Park City Film Music Festival in Park City, Utah. In the summer of 2007 he joined 311 on their Summer Unity Tour. He also performed in the 2008 documentary Call + Response. His third studio album, Light, was released on August 25, 2009, along with the live EP Live at Twist & Shout. Around 2008–2009, he also began his longstanding collaboration with members of the Dub Trio. From July 10–30, 2010, Matisyahu (along with The Dirty Heads) supported Sublime with Rome (the new version of the band) on their Sublime with Rome Tour.

In November 2009, NBC used Matisyahu's song "One Day" as background music for their advertisement of the Olympic games. This stirred up speculation that "One Day" might become the theme song for the 2010 Olympics. However, it remained only NBC's top pick, and was not announced to be the theme song. On August 2, 2010, Matisyahu revealed to OC Weekly that he has been writing new songs for his next album, which was expected to be recorded within weeks of his statement. On November 3, 2010, he performed his music accompanied by a single acoustic guitarist, recited poetry and answered questions at the University of Central Florida. On November 26, 2010, Matisyahu released "Two", a special edition Record Store Day Black Friday 7" vinyl record, for independent record stores. He recorded a Sephardic music-influenced hip hop song "Two Child One Drop" for Sephardic Music Festival, Vol. 1, a compilation album released by Shemspeed, alongside artists such as formerly-Hasidic rapper Y-Love, Israeli hip-hop group Hadag Nahash, and psychedelic rock/Sephardic fusion group Pharaoh's Daughter.

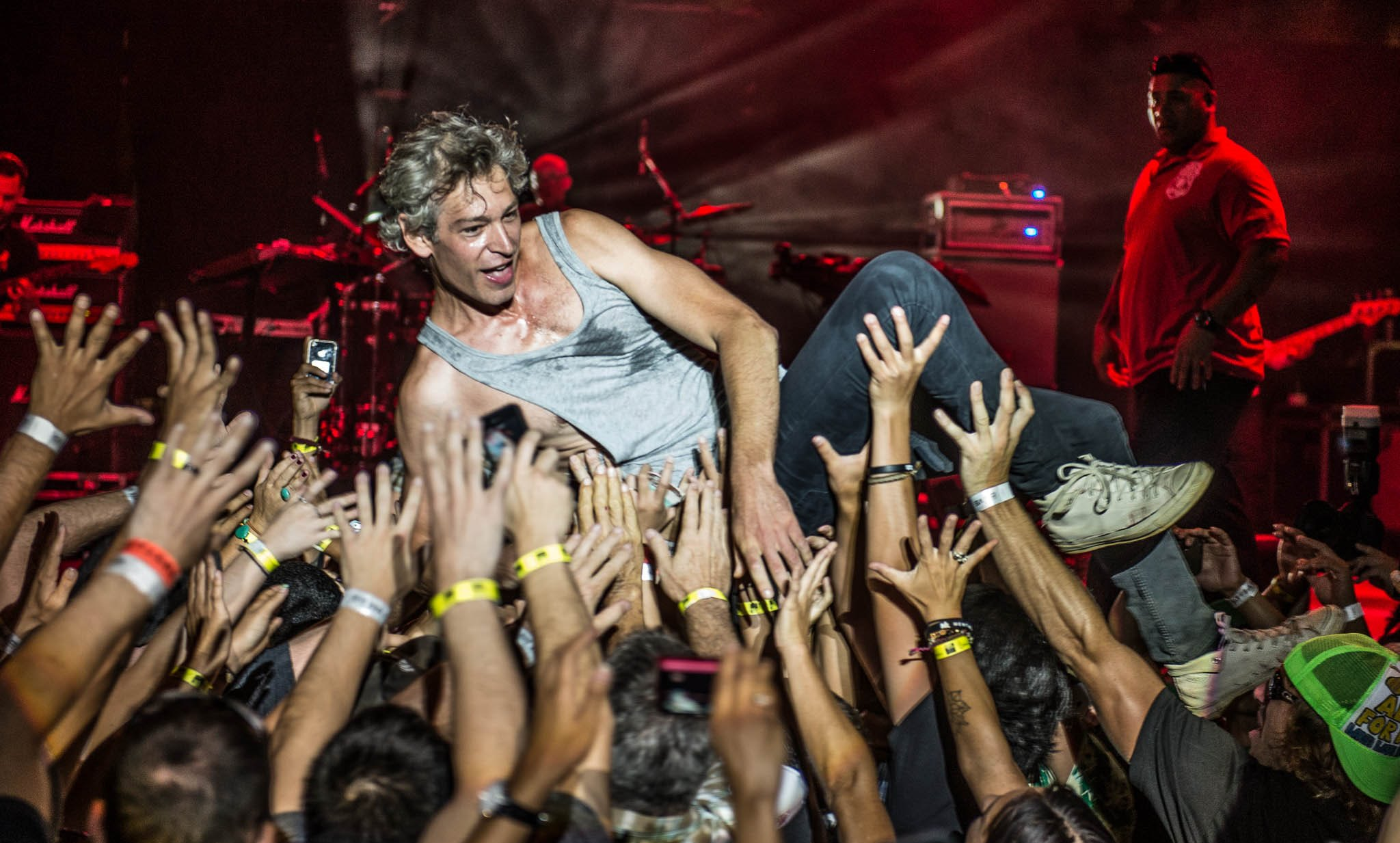
Matisyahu at Republik Music Festival 4, Honolulu, Hawaii, June 9, 2014

On August 18, 2010, Matisyahu returned to Stubb's in Austin, Texas, for another live recording for Live at Stubb's, Vol. 2. He released the album on February 1, 2011. That year, he embarked on a concert tour throughout the United States in support of the album with his backing band, Dub Trio. In March 2011, Matisyahu was featured on the DeScribe song, "Pure Soul". On July 17, 2012, Matisyahu released his fourth studio album, Spark Seeker, which was produced by Kool Kojak and featured two collaborations with rapper Shyne. The album also featured the single "Sunshine".

On June 3, 2014, Matisyahu released Akeda, which is slightly different from his previous work. Matisyahu himself described it as a "stripped back sound" and in a style as he describes as "less is more". Akeda was in the iTunes Top 10 a week later, ranking at No. 6 which was the same week he began his new tour. The tour started at Kakaako Waterfront Park in Honolulu, Hawaii, as part of the Republik Music Festival 4.

On August 17, 2015, the Rototom Sunsplash festival in Spain canceled Matisyahu's scheduled appearance, at the request of the BDS Movement, due to his refusing to sign a letter denouncing Israeli policies. This led to many organizations around the world criticizing the organization of discriminating against Jews as Matisyahu is American and not Israeli. Two days later the Spanish government condemned the decision to cancel his appearance. On August 19, the festival apologized to Matisyahu and re-invited him to perform as originally scheduled, following outrage around the world. The organizers released a statement saying they "made a mistake, due to the boycott and the campaign of pressure, coercion and threats employed by the BDS." Matisyahu's performance was peaceful with some Palestinian flags waved by the audience, including protestors holding up signs comparing Matisyahu to Nazis and trying to block fans from watching his performance. Matisyahu later said the racism he experienced in those moments was worse than anything he'd experienced in his career at that time.

On October 10, 2015, Matisyahu performed in Israel at the Sultan's Pool in Jerusalem against the backdrop of escalating stabbing attacks in the city. Matisyahu stated that it is important for "American Jews like [him]self to come to Israel no matter what's happening here". Jerusalem's mayor, Nir Barkat, thanked Matisyahu and said before the performance that "Everyone who came here today and is maintaining their regular routine is a partner in fighting terror." Before singing "Jerusalem (Out of Darkness Comes Light)" (his ode to the city), Matisyahu said, "Jerusalem, I'm home."

In 2016, Matisyahu went on a tour of 12 US college campuses as a response to being disinvited from the Rototom Sunsplash festival in 2015. The tour was co-sponsored by various Hillel chapters. On November 18, 2016, Matisyahu released Release the Bound, a five-song digital EP featuring brand new music. The EP includes collaborative efforts with relative mainstay Stu Brooks as well as The Polish Ambassador and Salt Cathedral.

Matisyahu released his sixth studio album, Undercurrent, on May 19, 2017, via Fallen Spark and Thirty Tigers. In the fall of 2017, he went on a European tour in support of the album. Matisyahu's "One Day" was featured in the MacGillivray Freeman Film, Dream Big playing in IMAX theaters beginning in February 2018.

In October 2021, Matisyahu released the single, "Chameleon". He followed that in January 2022 with the single "Keep Coming Back For More". The two songs served as the first singles off of his self-titled album which was released on March 25, 2022, through Thirty Tigers and distributed by The Orchard. Produced by Colombian band and production duo Salt Cathedral, it was Matisyahu's seventh studio album and his first since 2017's Undercurrent.

In February 2024, two concerts in the Southwest US, in Tucson, Arizona, and Santa Fe, New Mexico, were cancelled due to "safety concerns related to the reggae singer's staunchly pro-Israel stance," and in March 2024 another concert was cancelled in Chicago. Pro-Palestinian activists credited themselves for the cancelations. Matisyahu responded to the cancellations by saying, "they do this because they are either anti-Semitic or have confused their empathy for the Palestinian people with hatred for someone like me who holds empathy for both Israelis and Palestinians." Matisyahu sent a message to his fans expressing sadness over the cancellations, ending with the message that "we will not respond to hate with hate." Following the security threats and canceled shows, Matisyahu traveled to Israel to perform two live shows in Jerusalem and Tel Aviv. Santa Fe Mayor Alan Webber issued a statement, saying "there is a significant difference between protesting the policies of the Netanyahu government in Gaza and shutting down the performance of a Jewish-American artist in Santa Fe."

== Collaborations ==
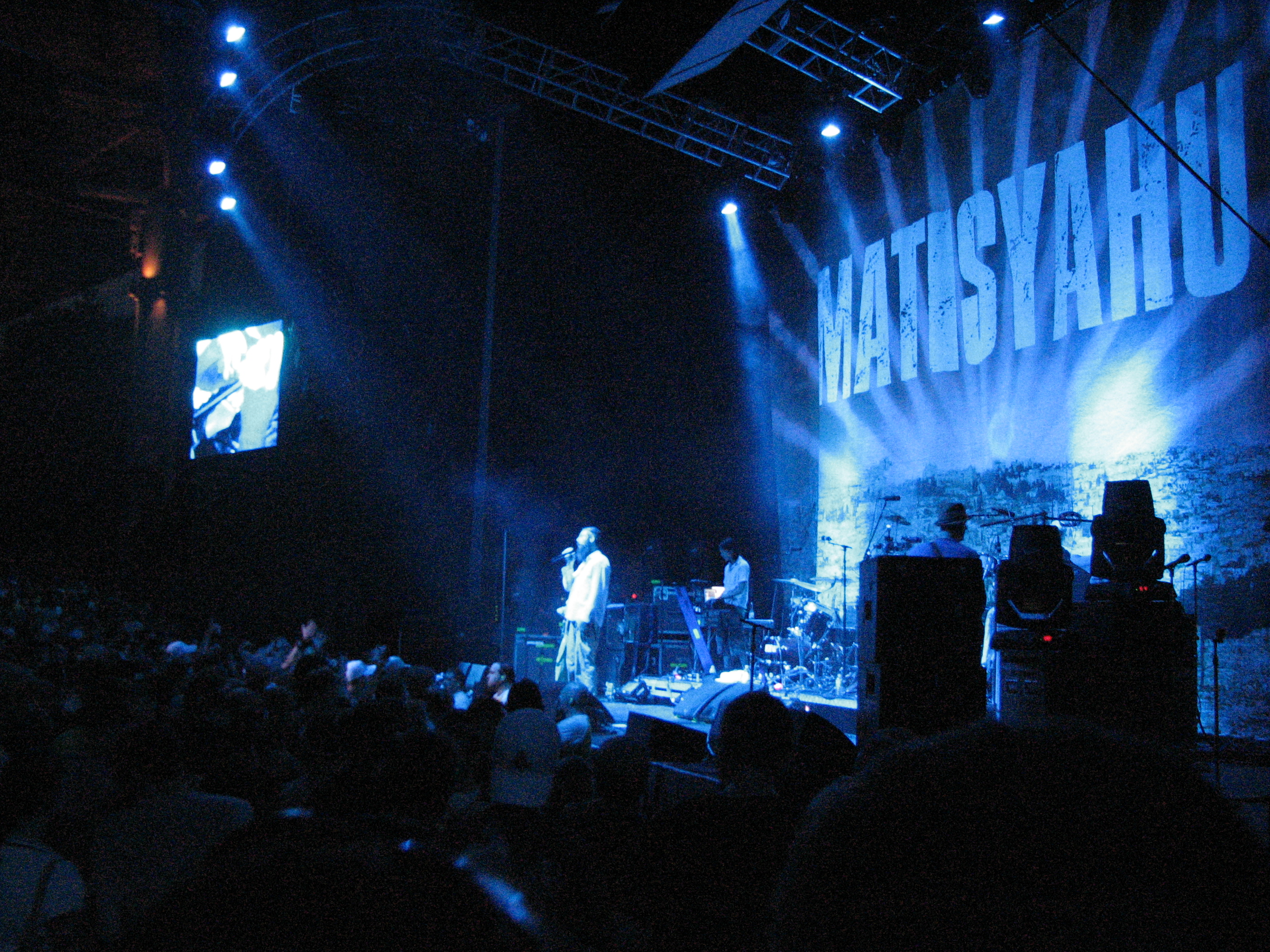
Matisyahu, July 2007, Mansfield, Massachusetts; on tour with 311

Matisyahu has performed with Kenny Muhammad, a Muslim beatboxer. He also recorded the song "One Day" along with Akon, who is also Muslim. Matisyahu is featured on Trevor Hall's single "Unity" from his self-titled album. Matisyahu is also featured on "Roots in Stereo" and "Strength of My Life" from P.O.D.'s album Testify. Matisyahu collaborated with Shyne on the song "Buffalo Soldier" from his 2012 release, Spark Seeker.

Matisyahu collaborated with J. Ralph on the song "Crossroads feat. J. Ralph" from his 2012 release, Spark Seeker. Matisyahu collaborated with Infected Mushroom on the song "One Day", as well as during various live sets. Matisyahu collaborated with Moon Taxi on the song "Square Circles" off the band's 2012 release Cabaret. He has also collaborated with The Crystal Method in their single "Drown in the Now". He is featured on Dirty Heads's album Cabin by the Sea on the single "Dance All Night". Matisyahu also collaborated with Boston-based rapper Nosson Zand on his 2013 release, "Believers". Matisyahu is featured on the 19-track compilation album, Songs for a Healthier America, a collaborative project by the Partnership for a Healthier America, whose honorary chair First Lady Michelle Obama, and Hip Hop Public Health. His song "U R What You Eat" also features Travis Barker, Ariana Grande, and Salad Bar. In 2014, Matisyahu was featured on Cisco Adler's song "Hypnotize", which was included on his Coastin album. In 2015, Matisyahu collaborated with Avicii in his album "Stories", where he sang alongside Wyclef Jean in "Can't Catch Me". Matisyahu is featured on the Common Kings 2018 EP One Day for the song "Broken Crowns". In 2022, he was featured on the song "Blacklist" by Hirie on her album "Mood Swings". In 2023, he was featured on Coyote Island's "Casio Magic".

== Artistry ==
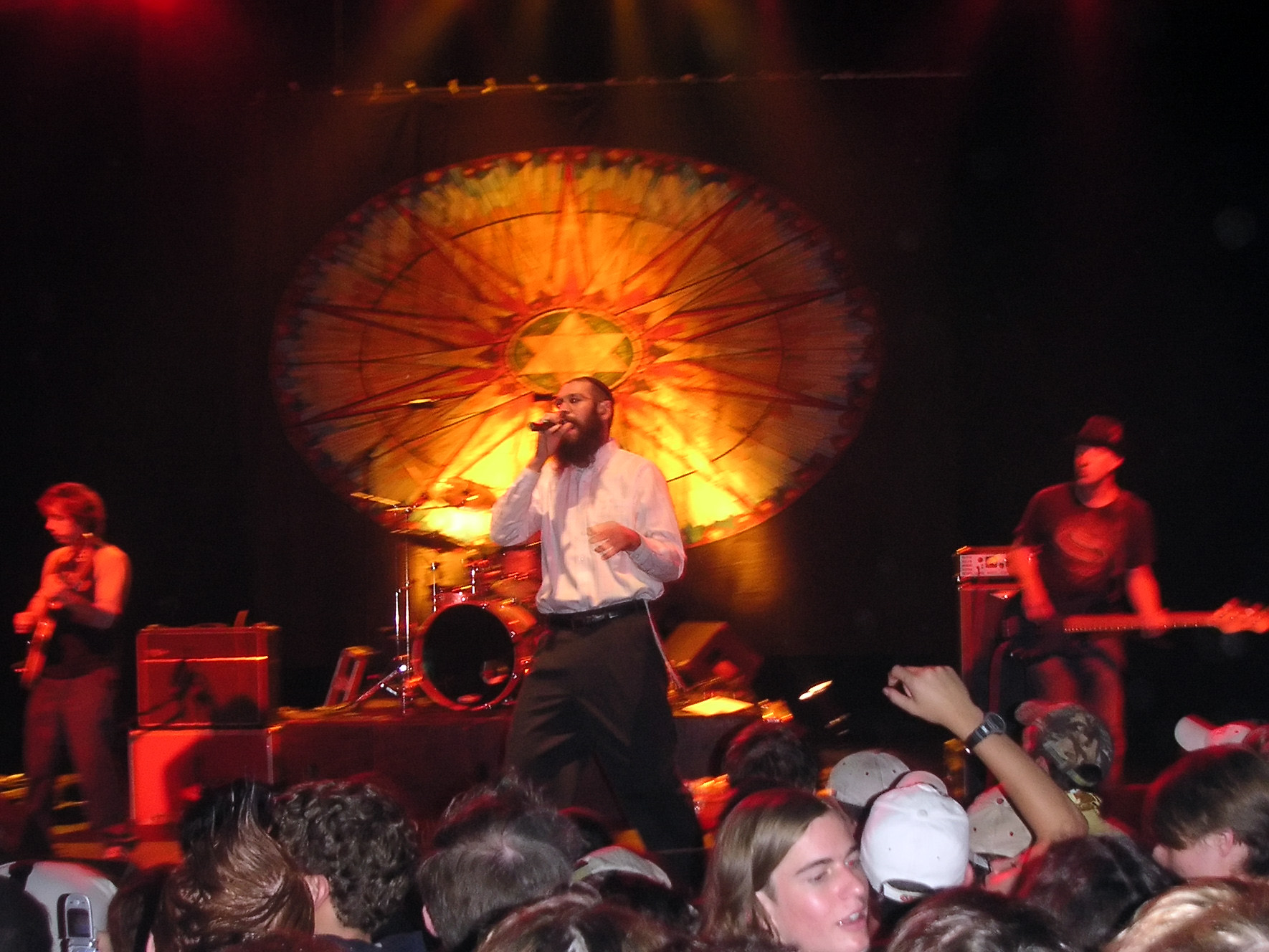
Matisyahu performance in 2005

Matisyahu fuses the African-influenced styles of reggae, rap, beatboxing, and hip-hop with vocal disciplines of jazz's scat singing and Judaism's hazzan style of songful prayer. The New York Times' Kelefa Sanneh wrote that "His sound owes a lot to early dancehall reggae stars like Barrington Levy and Eek-a-Mouse."

The Chicago Tribune's Kevin Pang described a Matisyahu performance as "soul-shaking brand of dancehall reggae, a show that captures both the jam band vibe of Phish and the ska-punk of Sublime."

In 2006, Matisyahu stated that "All of my songs are influenced and inspired by the teachings that inspire me. I want my music to have meaning, to be able to touch people and make them think. Chassidus teaches that music is 'the quill of the soul.' Music taps into a very deep place and speaks to us in a way that regular words can't."

In 2009, he said about his recently released album Light, "I think the vast majority of people that respect what I do are willing to move with me. I think it's not so much about genres or styles of music as it is about expressing the emotion or the idea. ... Whatever allows you to do that, whatever style, as long as it's authentic." However, he has been criticized for cultural appropriation of Rastafarian, Jamaican and African American musical styles and imagery.

== Personal life ==
=== Family ===
Matisyahu met NYU film student Tahlia (née Silverman) when she interviewed him for a documentary about men and women not touching each other. They were set up by Rabbi Dov Yonah Korn, NYU's Chabad rabbi, and they married in August 2004. Together they have sons Laivy (2005), Shalom, and Menachem Mendel (2011), likely in homage to Rabbi Menachem Mendel Schneerson. In a 2014 interview, Matisyahu confirmed that he had divorced his wife "about a year ago."

Matisyahu also fathered his first daughter in 2014 with longtime friend Toma Danley. The baby was born in Portland, OR, while he was on tour with Adel Tawil in Germany. The newborn was diagnosed with a rare heart defect, underwent three open-heart surgeries at 1, 3, and 9 years old, and has reportedly fully recovered. She has lived with her mother in Portland, OR since birth. Matisyahu and Danley met in 1997 while he was attending the wilderness program in Bend, OR. Matisyahu and Toma have shared parenting responsibilities over the years.

Matisyahu met Talia Dressler when she was 18 years old; the two became engaged on April 20, 2019. They were married in a private wedding ceremony held in Matisyahu's backyard on May 19, 2019. They have one daughter born in 2020 and a son born in 2022.

His firstborn son Laivy Miller started his own music career in 2022. The same year, Miller joined his father's summer tour across the US. Miller released various singles in 2023 and his first EP in November 2024.

=== Religion ===
From 2001 through July 2007, Matisyahu was affiliated with the Chabad-Lubavitch Hasidic community in Crown Heights, Brooklyn, New York, whose rabbi officiated at his wedding in 2004. Soon after his adoption of Hasidism, Matisyahu began studying Torah at Hadar Hatorah, a yeshiva for returnees to Judaism where he wrote and recorded his first album. He counts Bob Marley, Phish, God Street Wine and Rabbi Shlomo Carlebach among his musical inspirations and gives credit to Rabbi Simon Jacobson's book Toward a Meaningful Life for the lyrical inspiration to Youth's title track. As part of his faith, he strictly observed the Jewish Sabbath, which begins at sundown on Friday; thus he did not perform in concert on Friday nights. An exception to this rule occurred at a 2007 concert in Fairbanks, Alaska; since the sun did not set until 2:00 a.m., performing in the late hours was not a violation of Jewish observance.

However, as of July 17, 2007, he told the Miami New Times in an interview that he no longer "necessarily" identifies with the Lubavitch movement. In the interview he stated, "The more I'm learning about other types of Jews, I don't want to exclude myself. I felt boxed in." Additionally, in the fall of 2007, while on a family vacation spent primarily in Jerusalem's Nachlaot neighborhood, he expressed interest in another Hasidic group, that of Karlin. As of November 2007 he had confirmed a preference to pray at the Karliner synagogue in Borough Park, Brooklyn, where the custom is to ecstatically scream prayers; however, he continued to reside in Crown Heights because of his wife's affinity for the community.

On December 13, 2011, after a session with his therapist, Matisyahu walked into a Supercuts on the Upper West Side in Manhattan and shaved his beard. Matisyahu posted a beardless picture of himself on Twitter, explaining on his website:

When I started becoming religious 10 years ago it was a very natural and organic process. It was my choice. My journey: to discover my roots and explore Jewish spirituality—not through books but through real life. At a certain point I felt the need to submit to a higher level of religiosity...to move away from my intuition and to accept an ultimate truth. I felt that in order to become a good person I needed rules—lots of them—or else I would somehow fall apart. I am reclaiming myself. Trusting my goodness and my divine mission.

Despite shaving his beard, Matisyahu remained a religious Jew and began to attend a Hasidic synagogue associated with the Karlin dynasty in Williamsburg, Brooklyn.

=== Origin of his name ===
Matisyahu is an Ashkenazic Hebrew pronunciation of the Biblical Hebrew name מתתיהו Mattithyahu (Modern Hebrew pronunciation: Matityahu), meaning 'gift of God'. It is the name of the 2nd-century BCE Jewish leader of the Maccabees' revolt, often referred to by the Greek form of the name, Mattathias; and is the etymological source of the English name Matthew.

Matisyahu explained the origin of his use of the name as follows: while he, like most Jewish boys, received a Hebrew name at his brit milah (circumcision ceremony), when he was eight days old, Miller's family lost track of the names given. In Hebrew school, it was assumed to be Matisyahu because of the connection between Matthew and Matisyahu. The original certificate of bris was later located and Miller discovered that the actual name given at the bris was the Yiddish name "Feivish Hershel". He was advised by his rabbis to continue using the Hebrew name that he had grown up with.

== Touring members ==
Current

- Matisyahu – vocals
- Aaron Dugan – guitar
- Jason Fraticelli – bass
- Jason Lindner – keyboards
- Matt Scarano – drums

Dub Trio

- Stu Brooks – bass guitar (2009–present)
- Joe Tomino – drums (2009–present)
- D.P. Holmes – guitar (2009–present)

Other current collaborators

- Salt Cathedral (Juliana Ronderos and Nicolas Losada) – production (2016–present)
- Rob Marscher – keyboards (2008–present)
- Tim Keiper – drums

Former

- Joe Tomino – drums (2015)
- Stu Brooks – bass (2015)
- Big Yuki – keyboards (2016)
- Borahm Lee – keyboards (2006–2007)
- Skoota Warner – drums (2007–2008)
- Ezra Miller – drums, vocals (August 2023 - September 2023)

Roots Tonic

- Aaron Dugan – guitar (2004–2010)
- Jonah David – drums (2004–2007)
- Josh Werner – bass (2004–2007)

== Discography ==
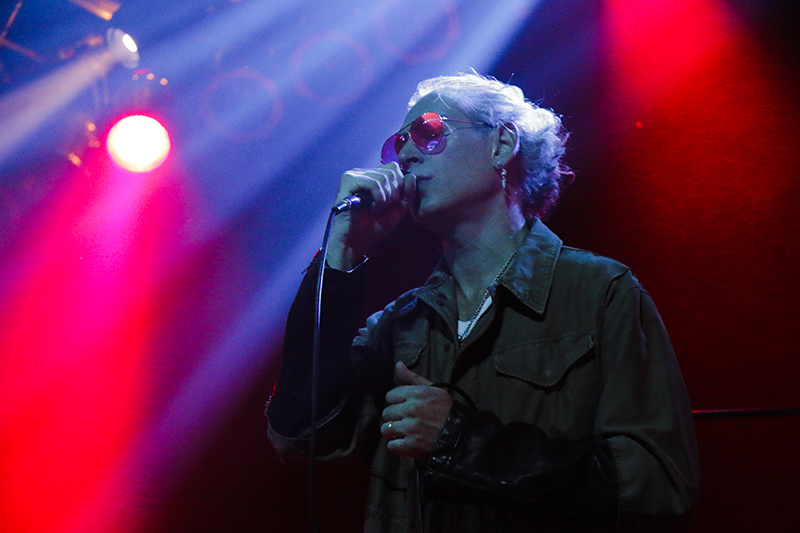
Matisyahu performing in 2019

Studio albums

- Shake Off the Dust... Arise (2004)
- Youth (2006)
- Light (2009)
- Spark Seeker (2012)
- Akeda (2014)
- Undercurrent (2017)
- Matisyahu (2022)
- Ancient Child (2026)

Live albums

- Live at Stubb's (2005)
- Live at Twist & Shout (2009)
- Live at Stubb's, Vol. 2 (2011)
- Five7Seven2 Live (2013)
- Live at Stubb's Vol. III (2015)

Remix albums

- Youth Dub (2006)
- No Place to Be (2006)

EPs

- Shattered EP (2008)
- Youth EP (2009)
- Miracle (2011)
- Spark Seeker: Acoustic Sessions (2013)
- Release the Bound (2016)
- Hold the Fire (2024)

Compilation Albums

- Playlist: The Very Best of Matisyahu (2012)

== Filmography ==
- A Buddy Story (2010) as Chassid
- The Possession (2012) as Tzadok

== See also ==
- Awake Zion – a documentary that compares Rastafarians and Jews
- Shulem Lemmer – American Belz Hasidic singer from Borough Park, Brooklyn, in New York Ci
- Hatikva 6 (התקווה 6) [literally "Hope 6"] – An Israeli reggae group that is often compared to Matisyahu, due to the universality of their sound.
