= Live at Stubb's (Matisyahu album) =

Live album by Matisyahu
- Released: August 23, 2005
- Recorded: Stubb's, Austin, Texas, February 19, 2005
- Genres: Reggae, alternative hip hop, alternative rock
- Length: 59:56
- Language: English
- Labels: Or Music, JDub
- Producers: Michael Caplan, Jacob Harris, and Angelo Montrone

Matisyahu chronology
Shake Off the Dust... Arise (2004)	Live at Stubb's (2005)	Youth (2006)

Matisyahu live chronology
Live at Stubb's (2005)	Live at Twist & Shout (2009)

Professional ratings
Review scores
Source	Rating
AllMusic	3.5/5 stars
Rolling Stone	2/5 stars

Live at Stubb's is a live album by Matisyahu. It was recorded live at Stubb's in Austin, Texas on February 19, 2005 under his record label Or Music. The album debuted at number 5 on the Billboard Reggae Albums Chart, then seven months later it debuted at number 176 on the Billboard 200. On the issue of January 7, 2006 it reached the top of on the Reggae Albums Chart, and on the issue of March 18, 2006 it reached number 30 on the Billboard 200. The album was also certified gold by the RIAA on February 27, 2006 with over 500,000 copies sold. On December 27, 2006 it was announced that Live at Stubb's was ranked 2nd on the Billboard Reggae album charts for the year. The CD contains the music video for "King Without a Crown".

== Track listing ==
1. "Sea to Sea" – 4:07
2. "Chop 'Em Down" – 4:03
3. "Warrior" – 7:58
4. "Lord Raise Me Up" – 3:52
5. "King Without a Crown" – 4:48
6. "Aish Tamid" – 6:55
7. "Beat Box" – 5:05
8. "Fire and Heights" – 4:20
9. "Exaltation" – 6:57
10. "Refuge" – 4:02
11. "Heights" – 3:23
12. "Close My Eyes" – 4:26
- All songs written by Matisyahu Miller and Josh Werner except Lord Raise Me Up written by Benjamin Hesse and Matisyahu Miller.

== Personnel ==
- Matisyahu Miller – Vocals, Beatboxing (on "Beatbox")

Roots Tonic:

- Aaron Dugan – Guitar
- Josh Werner – Bass guitar
- Jonah David – drums
- Yoni – MC (on "Beat Box")

== Production ==
- Michael Caplan – Producer
- Angelo Montrone – Producer, Mixing, Mastering, Recording Engineer
- Jacob Harris – Producer, Manager (JDub Music)
- Charlie Boswell – Recording
- Kelly Stuart – Recording
- Micheal O'Reilly – Mixing
- Cambria Harkey – Photographer
- Malcom H. Harper – Recording Assistant Engineer
- Greg Klinginsmith – Assistant Engineer
- Gerard Bustos – Assistant Engineer
- Will Harrison – Assistant Engineer

== Charts ==
=== Weekly charts ===
Chart (2006)	Peak position
Australian Albums (ARIA)	74
Dutch Albums (Album Top 100)	98
Dutch Alternative Albums (Alternative Top 30)	23
US Billboard 200	30
US Indie Store Album Sales (Billboard)	4
US Reggae Albums (Billboard)	1
US Top Rap Albums (Billboard)	14
US Top Rock Albums (Billboard)	6

=== Year-end charts ===
Chart (2006)	Position
US Billboard 200	133
US Reggae Albums (Billboard)	2
Chart (2007)	Position
US Reggae Albums (Billboard)	11
