= Youth (Matisyahu album) =

Studio album by Matisyahu
- Released: March 7, 2006
- Recorded: 2005
- Genres: Reggae fusion; hip hop; alternative rock; Jewish rock; Jewish hip hop; reggae
- Length: 46:55
- Label: JDub/Epic
- Producers: Bill Laswell, Ill Factor, and Jimmy Douglass

Matisyahu chronology
Live at Stubb's (2005)	Youth (2006)	Youth Dub (2006)

Matisyahu studio album chronology
Shake Off the Dust... Arise (2004)	Youth (2006)	Light (2009)

Singles from Youth
- 1. "King Without a Crown" Released: 2005; 2. "Youth" Released: 2006

Professional ratings
Review scores
Source	Rating
Allmusic	3/5 stars
Entertainment Weekly	C+
Pitchfork Media	(4.9/10)
Rolling Stone	3/5 stars
Slant Magazine	2.5/5 stars
Sputnikmusic	3/5 stars
Robert Christgau	(choice cut)

Youth is an album by American reggae singer Matisyahu, which was released on March 7, 2006. It is his second proper studio release, as Live at Stubb's is a live album. The CD quickly shot to the top of iTunes best sellers list the day it was released (partially because iTunes ran a special promotion for pre-orders).

The first single from the album is "King without a Crown", which also appeared on Matisyahu's previous album, Live at Stubb's. However, a different music video was shot for the Youth version of the song, whereas the version on the Stubb's concert album was accompanied by a concert video. The album debuted at number four on the Billboard 200 with over 119,000 copies sold in its first week released. A month later, the album was certified gold by the RIAA. As of September 24, 2008 the album has sold approximately 585,000 copies in the United States according to Nielsen Soundscan. On December 27, 2006, Billboard announced that Youth ranked 3rd overall on the 2006 Reggae album charts, immediately behind Live at Stubb's.

The topic of the album is mostly the support and promotion of youth voice, more explicitly in the eponymous second track. The album, along with its topic, mixes Matisyahu's lyrics, which contain several references to his Jewish beliefs, with a mainstream sound.

== Track listing ==
No.	Title	Writer(s)	Length
1.	"Fire of Heaven/Altar of Earth"	Matisyahu Miller, Josh Werner	3:59
2.	"Youth"	Josh Werner, Matisyahu Miller	4:19
3.	"Time of Your Song"	Ivan Corraliza, Jimmy Douglass, Matisyahu Miller	4:27
4.	"Dispatch the Troops"	Josh Werner, Jonah David, Aaron Dugan, Matisyahu Miller	4:05
5.	"Indestructible"	Matisyahu Miller, Jimmy Douglass, Ivan Corraliza	4:10
6.	"What I'm Fighting For"	Josh Werner	2:11
7.	"Jerusalem"	Matisyahu Miller, Ivan Corraliza, Jimmy Douglass	4:00
8.	"WP"	Jonah David, Josh Werner, Aaron Dugan, Matisyahu Miller, Daniel Isenberg	3:59
9.	"Shalom/Saalam"	Matisyahu Miller, Youssou	1:06
10.	"Late Night in Zion"	Aaron Dugan, Matisyahu Miller	3:14
11.	"Unique Is My Dove"	Aaron Dugan, Josh Werner, Matisyahu Miller	3:24
12.	"Ancient Lullaby"	Jonah David, Matisyahu Miller, Aaron Dugan	4:19
13.	"King Without a Crown"	Josh Werner, Matisyahu Miller	3:42
Total length:			46:48

Japanese edition bonus tracks
No.	Title	Length
14.	"Warrior"	4:43
15.	"Spark Seekers"	5:03
16.	"King Without a Crown" (Remix by Mike D.)	4:20
Total length:		60:54

== Personnel ==
- Matisyahu – vocals
- Roots Tonic – music (Aaron Dugan: guitar, Josh Werner: bass and keys, Jonah David: drums)
- Marlon "Moshe" Sobol – guest musician on "WP"
- Stan Ipcus – guest musician on "WP"
- Yusu Youssou – guest musician on "Shalom/Saalam" and "Ancient Lullaby"
- Bill Laswell – production, engineering
- Ill Factor & Jimmy Douglass – production on "Time of Your Song", "Indestructible", and "Jerusalem"
- Bob Musso – engineering
- James Dellatacoma – assistant engineering
- Michael Fossenkemper – mastering

== Charts ==
Chart performance for Youth
Chart (2006)	Peak position
Australian Albums (ARIA)	57
Belgian Albums (Ultratop Flanders)	85
Canadian Albums (Nielsen SoundScan)	30
Dutch Albums (Album Top 100)	48
Dutch Alternative Albums (Alternative Top 30)	9
Finnish Albums (Suomen virallinen lista)	35
Irish Albums (IRMA)	47
Italian Albums (FIMI)	65
Japanese Albums (Oricon)	32
Swedish Albums (Sverigetopplistan)	43
UK Albums (Official Charts)	152
UK R&B Albums (Official Charts)	15
US Billboard 200	4
US Indie Store Album Sales (Billboard)	1
US Reggae Albums (Billboard)	1
US Top Rap Albums (Billboard)	3
US Top Rock Albums (Billboard)	2
