= Cancer Ward (album) =

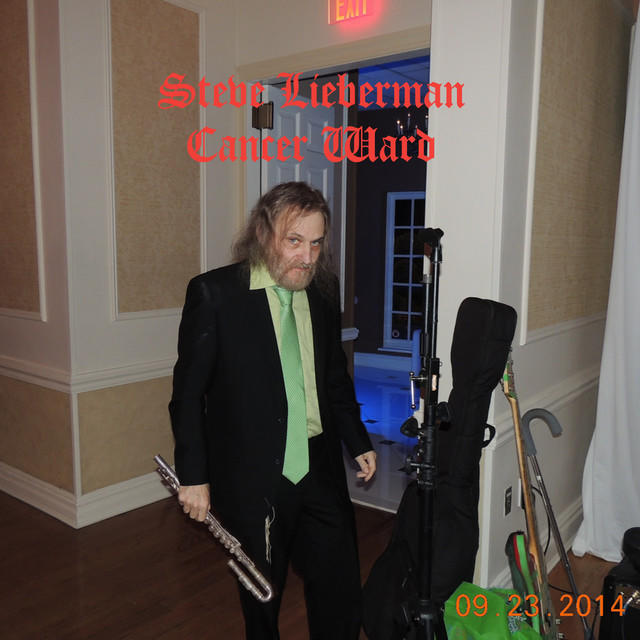

Studio album by Steve Lieberman
- Released: 30 December 2014
- Recorded: November 2013 – November 2014
- Genre: Punk rock, garage, obscuro, industrial, Dance, progressive rock
- Length: 78:35
- Label: JDub
- Producer: Steve Lieberman

Steve Lieberman chronology
| My Magic Last Days (2012) | Cancer Ward (2014) | Return Of the Jewish Pirate 1-4 (2015) |

Cancer Ward is a punk-rock, garage, industrial dance album, and the 22nd album from Jewish-American, bi-polar outsider punk musician, Steve Lieberman, released on 30 December 2014, when he was 56 years old. It is a concept album, largely dealing with Lieberman's six-month long experimental chemotherapy at Memorial Sloan-Kettering between September 2013 and February 2014, the third round of treatment failing to halt the progression of his leukemia. The underlying theme is Lieberman's dealing with death and dying early because of the resistant, uncurable nature of his disease. The album took over one year to produce, as Lieberman was hospitalized frequently during 2014, as his cancer progressed to stage 3.

== Track listing ==
All tracks are written by Steve Lieberman except where noted.

| No. | Title | Length |
|---|---|---|
| 1. | "The Beat of My Funeral Drum" (Roger Waters) | 3:03 |
| 2. | "Cancer Ward #1-Leukemia Services M-4384" | 4:23 |
| 3. | "Get Off The Bus" | 4:17 |
| 4. | "Retriever-Head Shifter" | 4:50 |
| 5. | "Cancer Ward #2-Vera" | 4:44 |
| 6. | "Cancer Ward #3-The Phlebotomy" | 3:37 |
| 7. | "My Spleen Is A Beastmachine" | 6:27 |
| 8. | "Cancer Ward #4-Progressions and Transformations" | 2:57 |
| 9. | "Cancer Ward #5-The Woozatorium" | 5:02 |
| 10. | "Cancer Ward #6-B+ On A Pole" | 3:23 |
| 11. | "My Last Chanukah" | 7:10 |
| 12. | "Cancer Ward #7-32 Waist" | 3:33 |
| 13. | "My Last Good Day" | 4:31 |
| 14. | "Cancer Ward #8-The Hospice Room" | 4:13 |
| 15. | "Presence Of The L-rd" (Eric Clapton) | 3:41 |
| 16. | "My Kingdom" (Ian McCulloch) | 3:04 |
| 17. | "The Punk Meets The Godfather" (Pete Townshend) | 5:36 |
| 18. | "Seasons in the Sun" (Jacques Brel) | 4:51 |

== Personnel ==
- Steve Lieberman - bass guitar, guitar, vocals, flutes, recorders, melodica, beatmachines

== Singles ==
| Year | Title | Peak chart positions | | | Charts |
| Year | Title | Soundclick Main Genre | Soundclick Subgenre | Broadjam | Charts |
|---|---|---|---|---|---|
| 2013 | "My Kingdom" | 25 | 1 | - | Alternative/Brit-Pop |
| 2013 | "Cancer Ward #3-The Phlebotomy" | 19 | 1 | — | Rock/Punk |
| 2013 | "Retriever-Head Shifter" | 13 | 3 | — | Metal/Alternative Metal |
| 2013 | "My Spleen Is A Beastmachine" | 43 | 1 | - | Alternative/Dance Punk |
| 2014 | "Get Off The Bus" | 21 | 1 | - | Rock/Punk |
| 2014 | "My Last Chanukah" | 23 | 3 | - | Pop/Seasonal |
| 2014 | "Cancer Ward #6-B+ On A Pole" | 17 | 6 | - | Metal/Heavy Metal |
| 2015 | "My Last Good Day " | 21 | 1 | - | Rock/Garage Rock |
