= Steve Lieberman =

New York musician (born 1958)

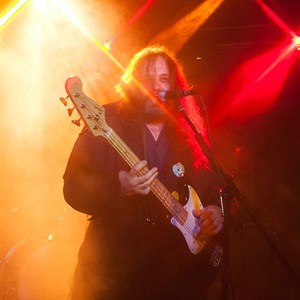
- Lieberman playing on 'My Last Rock Show' December 11, 2011, before first round of chemotherapy

Background information
- Also known as: The Gangsta Rabbi; The King Of Jewish Punk, Steven Lieberman-Marcus Steve Lieberman the Gangsta Rabbi
- Born: Steven Paul Lieberman; June 21, 1958 (age 68); Brooklyn, New York
- Origin: Freeport, New York
- Genres: Punk rock, Art rock, Jewish rock, Noise rock, Garage punk, Industrial rock, Outsider music, Metal, Marching band, Jewish music, Jazz
- Instruments: Bass guitar, flutes, vocals, guitar, keyboards, brass, woodwinds, drum machine
- Years active: 1971–2012, 2014–present
- Labels: JDub, Bad'lan USA
- Website: www.gangstarabbi.com

Steven Paul Lieberman (born June 21, 1958), also known as the Gangsta Rabbi and The King of Jewish Punk, (Hebrew name ליב פרץ בין אליאזר ה־בדלן ה־נזדי or Lev Ava'ran bar-Eli'ezar ha-Bad'lan ha-Naz'ari) is a Jewish-American punk rock /metal singer, songwriter, multi-instrumental musician, composer, arranger, producer and former village comptroller residing in Freeport, New York. He is a Hebrew Nazarite, the founder of The Bad'lanim, a minority sect of Judaism and a vegetarian since 1995. He held the Guinness World Record for Longest Officially Released Song for The Noise Militia (#38/76) at 35 hours, 41 minutes and 9 seconds, from December 3, 2020, until October 2, 2021. On June 1, 2022, Lieberman's sequel to "The Noise Militia" entitled The Post-Militia Pogo-Battalion(#39/77) was completed with a duration of 76 hours, 30 minutes and 27 seconds and was submitted to Guinness unsuccessfully to reclaim the record. During the sessions of The Noise Militia, Lieberman experimented with the fusion of genres where he developed "Militia Punk" a mixture of noise-punk, thrash- metal and military music.

Lieberman is often considered an outsider musician, This has been partially attributed to his lifelong struggle with bipolar disorder, which first struck him in 1970 at the age of 11, as well as his decade-long fight with progressive leukemia in his later years, which ultimately was deemed terminal and has become a recurring theme in his lyrics. By the end of 2017, Lieberman refused all further cancer treatment. From this time, he was in and out of home hospice care.

In 2009, Lieberman signed a multi-album deal with Jewish indie label JDub Records, taking the place of Matisyahu on their artist roster. As of the spring of 2011, Lieberman, a town comptroller by trade, was "the world's only Orthodox Jewish heavy metal musician with a record deal", according to Newsday.

Over his career, he has commercially released 40 CDs and 38 cassette albums in the underground, using the Bop Bop Bigger Bab-èL moniker and reissued in 2016 for the 25th anniversary of his first cassette album, "Bang the Bass Bopmania" as "Bop Bop Bigger Bab-èL featuring Steve Lieberman".

On all his releases, Lieberman sings and plays all instruments. On the early primitive-sounding cassette releases during the 1990s he played chords and leads on a distorted bass accompanied by a Yamaha DD-6 drum machine. By 2002 as he started releasing commercial CDs, he added and featured flutes as well as various brass instruments and a variety of Eastern instruments. In his later years, he has added 6-string guitars and arranged and played a full brass and woodwind choir in an effort to fuse punk rock with marching band music and jazz, and eventually opera and classical. He shared the stage with Weezer, Andrew WK, Glassjaw, Ryan Dunn and the Misfits before retiring from performing in December 2011 to battle accelerated phase myeloproliferative leukemia. He briefly returned to the stage in the spring of 2016 to perform Gangsta Rabbi's Quadrophenia performed in its entirety on a three-stop farewell tour as a solo act, accompanying himself on his trademark distorted bass, a 3-string Fender Stratocaster and alto trombone. His 2010 song "No Festival of Lights (On This Hanukkah)" has received honorable mention placement in the Song of the Year Award
Although Lieberman's music seemingly had little commercial success, unaudited download and stream sales of his first 40 records approached 20,000,000 in 21 years as of July 2023. In September 2018, Lieberman's single, "The Diarrhea Song" had briefly appeared on the Apple iTunes Top 100 UK Rock chart, peaking at No. 22 and "3 Little Puppies" peaked at No. 19 on the Apple iTunes Top 100 Other Territories Chart two years later .He received airplay on Rich Russo's free-form Anything Anything with Rich Russo radio show on New York City WRXP 101.9 and WDHA-FM 105.5 commercial rock radio stations. Throughout the shows Lieberman's music was featured on, Russo described him as "Jethro Tull meets the Beastie Boys, a one-man Jethro Tull" as well as "an inspiration to all suffering from serious illness" Additionally, Lieberman enjoyed some success on college radio, where The Rabbi Is Dead peaked at No. 3 on KZSU Stanford University in 2012 and "Jewish Pirate" had a one-week appearance at No. 8 on WUSB (FM) Stony Brook University two years after release in 2008.

== Life and career ==
=== 1958–1991 the early years ===
Steven Paul Lieberman was born on June 21, 1958, in Brooklyn, New York to a working-class Jewish family. He is the youngest son of Lester Lieberman (1928–2012), a quality control technician, and Ilene Lieberman (née Marcus) (1930–2014). At the time of his bar-mitzvah in 1971, Lieberman, already an observant Jew, acquired a bass guitar to fill a vacancy in his junior high school jazz band. He picked up the instrument and started playing it upside-down and backwards. After passing the jazz band audition, he had developed a crude system of chords for the bass; when properly distorted, they mimicked the major chords of the 6 string guitar. Forgoing this method for more conventional bass playing, Lieberman became the bassist for hard rock as well as jazz-rock fusion bands throughout high school, where he developed a lead bass style influenced by John Entwistle . During this time, he suffered from major depressive disorder and committed parasuicide at age 17. Amidst episodes of depression and mania, Lieberman graduated from college in 1980 with a BBA in accounting, where he worked his way up to become town comptroller by 1998, a position he held until his retirement in September 2014.

He was on hiatus from music through much of the 1980s except for recording a vinyl single "Nuclear Blitz (Edits 96 and 85)" in 1984, playing all the chords and leads on the bass guitar. Lieberman was married four times and divorced three times by his 33rd birthday and widowed at age 60.

=== 1991–1994 the underground cassette trade ===
He planned to return to music briefly in the spring of 1991, to commemorate his 20th year of playing the bass, this time accompanying himself with a used Yamaha DD-6 drum machine. By year's end he recorded a 13 track cassette called Bang The Bass Bopmania. Overdubbing tracks by using two portable cassette players, Lieberman started writing and recording bass-only crude punk/hardcore music. There was a free paper in the New York area at the time called The Musician's Exchange that would review Lieberman's cassettes and those of like-minded musicians in a column called "Independents' Day." This resulted in trading tapes amongst the musicians and circulating them throughout the underground.

Lieberman recorded under the "Bop Bop Bigger Bab'el" moniker from 1991 to 2001.

=== 1994–2001 enter The Gangsta Rabbi-stage left ===
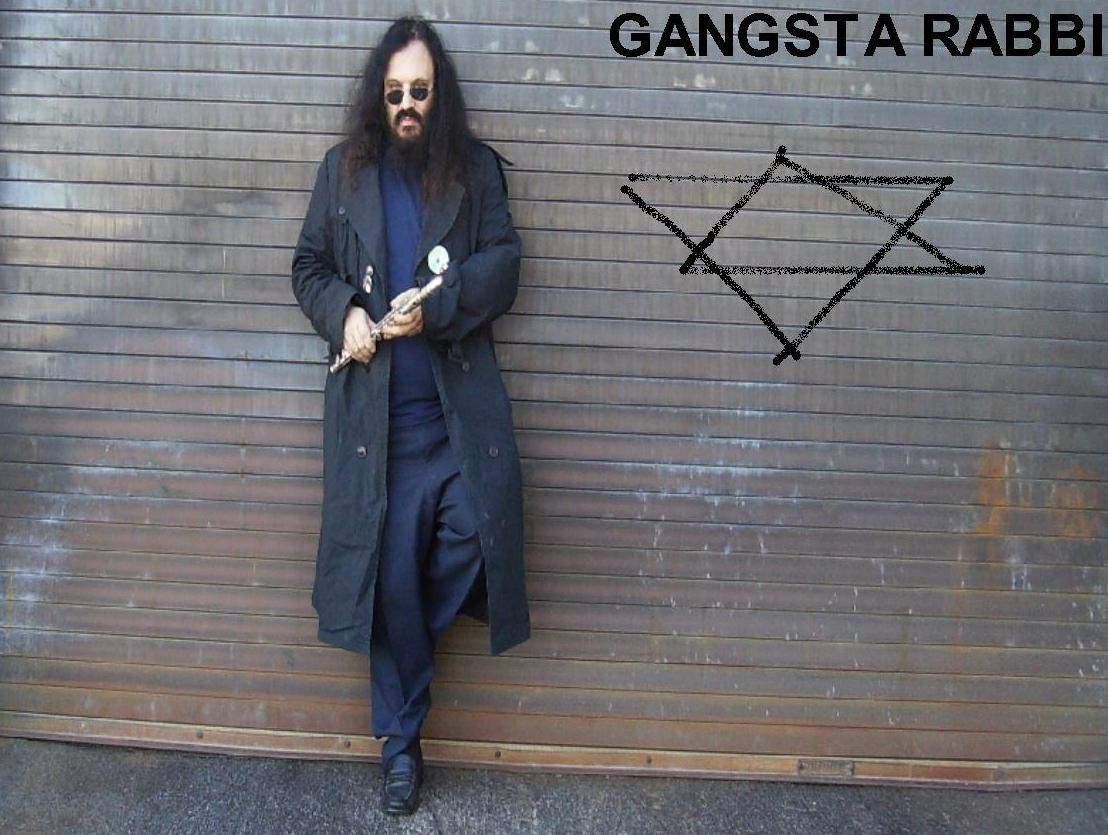
Steve Lieberman with curve-headed flute October 21, 2007

In 1994, Steve Lieberman began to study the Bible continually, as he did in the years following his bar-mitzvah. This time, he realized discrepancies between the Word in the Bible and the way modern Judaism is practiced. An example of this is that the modern Jewish calendar, besides having its months named after Babylonian gods violates a commandment given in Exodus 12:1, where the new year must be celebrated on the new moon directly preceding Passover, so why do 10 million Jews disobey God by celebrating "Rosh Hashannah" in the seventh month?

After confronting a rabbi with this question after he performed a grave unveiling ceremony, and the rabbi was unable to answer, Lieberman recorded his 20th tape entitled Gangsta Rabbi, the title track becoming his theme song and stage name – because "he likes to pick theological fights with actual rabbis".

His biblical studies caused Lieberman to break off from existing Jewish sects to found the Badlan'im (Heb:"isolationists") sect in 1995 where precepts include fasting, continual prayer, vegetarianism, and belief in only the Bible as the law, so that God's word is not superseded by that of the Talmud and other rabbinical writings. Additionally, he replaced the calendar from the current system, in the 58th century, to a more appropriate system, being in the 35th century, commemorating the Exodus from Egypt.

Packaging a live cassette from a First Night festival on New Year's Eve 1994 as Mission of Tolerance 5755-Live, the Musician's Exchange's head writer Paul Incinitti said of Lieberman's show, "based on the sound of the screaming crowd, Lieberman should tour and call (the tour) "No Sleep To Gaza". He is every skinhead's nightmare".

=== 2001 ashes of Bad'lania ===
After the release of his 36th cassette, Diaspora Blaster 36 in the spring of 2001, Steve Lieberman's house and studio were completely destroyed by an electrical fire. Acquiring a used flute and a book on how to play it, he wanted to start a genre that would fuse the flute with punk rock, as Jethro Tull did for blues-rock three decades prior.

=== 2002–2003 ===
By the spring of 2002, the studio and house were rebuilt and Lieberman purchased a Korg D1600 16 track digital recorder. Deciding that the user's manual was too thick and a bit boring, he just plugged in and winged it and three months later, out comes his first CD Bad'lania Rising, a "greatest hits" collection of the first 38 tapes. The title was the sequel of his last tape Ashes of Bad'lania where "Bad'lania" is the homeland of his Badlan'im sect.

==== Bad'lania Rising ====
By its August 27, 2002, release songs from Bad'lania Rising were known through the use of on-line music distributors; the largest at the time was mp3.com. His song "Puppy" debuted at 719 in the Garage Chart and "Gangsta Rabbi" at 1229 on the Jewish/Israeli list on mp3.com on June 24, 2002, the first day after release. Looking for a genre that would best tolerate his new style, the progressive rock community showed least objection. In a review in their site progressiveworld.net which yielded Bad'lania 2 out of 5 stars said the record was "awful", but praised his newly learned flutework which was played over the racket of everything else and closed by saying "we are fascinated by the eccentric ... but... I just can't say I enjoy listening to it.".

==== Jewish Lightning ====
Re-recording many of the post-1996 heavily Jewish-themed tunes with the exception of the new Astroland Spring-Green '415, Lieberman's second CD Jewish Lightning was released on September 16, 2003. This record, as Bad'lania, received some poor grades for listenability because of Lieberman's overuse of ethnic instruments and non-conforming methods in the studio, but for the content, "identifying with Biblical ancestry and anger towards the Holocaust" he was dubbed "a proud Israelite poet" by Binyamin Bresky at Cleveland Jewish Radio.

Additionally, in a tribute to Nazi-hunter Simon Wiesenthal after his 2005 death, Jewish music journalist Baron Dave Romm said of Lieberman in a review of Lightning, "his energy and attitude are infectious. He has something to say and by damn he's going to say it ... he's as fearless as Simon Wiesenthal and just as smolderingly angry."

==== Desert Fever Brigade ====
The Desert Fever Brigade sessions during the spring and summer of 2003 yielded 35 songs of which 21 of the most "commercial" were included on the CD. The album was released on December 29, 2003. Reviewers showed the work little respect, as Adam Mico of the Daily Vault said in his review of DFB—Mr Lieberman has no control center in the brain, hence this CD sounds the way it does. After Desert Fever Brigade's release, Steve Lieberman held the No. 1 artist spot on mp3.com.au, the largest on-line distributor in Australia, for 6 weeks spanning December 2003 – January 2004.

=== 2004–2005 skinheads in my yard oy vey ===
==== Liquidatia-455 ====
For the release of his 4th album Liquidatia-455, he was invited to promote the album by Jill Morrison at WUSB (FM) on June 9, 2004. "Liquidatia" charted on some college radio Top 30 charts at Harvard (#28), Montclair State (#6), Duke University (#30) and Stanford (#27).

==== Jewish Riot Oy! Oy! Oy! ====
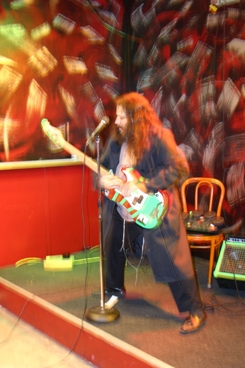
Steve Lieberman plays bass solo-Cup-A-Cino's Detroit, MI September 18, 2004

In September 2004, Lieberman traveled to Detroit, where he played, recorded and filmed a show and released the results as what would be his 6th CD and first live record called Jewish Riot Oy! Oy! Oy!, released January 5, 2005, The small audience was evident by the limited applause on the recording. Journalist James McQuistion said that "Lieberman should seriously consider trying to create a more live-feeling studio experience, as this is the essence of eir music, free of all the unnecessary chaos that Lieberman likes to thread throughout eir music." Bill Cuevas, music director at KZSU Stanford University summed up Lieberman's attitude as a live performer in his review of Jewish Riot which peaked at No. 41 on the station's chart:"I just love how its obvious theres like 5 people in the audience while this guy gives the performance of his life."

After returning home from Detroit, Buttons, his beloved lab mix who had been the subject of quite a few of Lieberman's songs, had passed at 14 1/2 on September 22, 2004. He played some shows in New York City including CBGB's and the Acme Underground. Author/promoter Steven Blush was promoting a Thanksgiving Eve jam on November 24, 2004, at Don Hills and was the first to book Lieberman as "Gangsta Rabbi".

==== Arbeiter at the Gate ====
After his attempt in New York City, Lieberman hooked up with the now defunct Long Island Music Coalition (LIMC) headed up by WUSB DJ Rich Hughes, who provided him with some work in clubs. When interviewed about Lieberman by Newsday in the fall of 2004, he said he "first heard Lieberman on a local radio show in his car. 'I nearly drove into a tree,' he recalls. But something about the music stuck with him. I like the way he follows his own muse".

Lieberman released his 5th album, Arbeiter at the Gate, on October 18, 2004. When the Allmusic guide received its copy, because Lieberman dedicated a song "The A.M.G." to them, critic Gregory McIntosh reviewed the CD, giving it a surprising 3 1/2 stars citing "Mostly, the appeal of Arbeiter at the Gate, and indeed all of Lieberman's work, is the sheer and impressive fearlessness of it".

Arbeiter peaked at No. 42 on WXDU-Duke University and on May 22, 2005, hit No. 87 at KZSU, and two weeks later, "Jewish Riot" re-entered at No. 360 one notch lower than "Arbeiter" holding No. 359.

==== Jew in the Underground ====
During the early part of 2005, Steve Lieberman frequented open mic night at a club called Munchaba in Levittown, NY. It was hosted by comedian/musician Evan Wecksell who referred to Lieberman as an "anti-musician". Lieberman and Wecksell did a few shows together called the "Jews Who Rock" tour.

At the same time, Rafer Guzman, the local music reporter at Newsday, came to one of Lieberman's shows and interviewed him for the paper. The cover of the article, published on February 27, 2005, featured a full-page picture of Lieberman playing the bass and singing at the show.

In the article, subtitled "A Crowd of Seven" referring to the generally consistent poor attendance at the show, Guzman, in detail, describes the dynamics of Lieberman's stage show: "Then he laid down a barrage of thunderous bass notes and snarled unintelligibly in a gravelly, slurred voice. Each song also featured a wild, high-pitched flute solo, with Lieberman occasionally slapping the bass to sustain the rumbling feedback." Concluding, Guzman states that Lieberman's music is all about his emotions and his message, not his talent.

Shortly after, on June 7, 2005, Lieberman released his 7th CD, Jew in the Underground.

==== Punkifier ====
On Tuesday August 2, 2005, the host signing in the artists for the open mic at The Downtown recognized Lieberman from the Newsday article six months prior. Opening with "Dogpark" from Liquidatia-455 and closing with "Punkifier 76-FX" from his forthcoming album, the emcee booked Lieberman to open for the Viva La Bam rock show featuring Ryan Dunn and Don Vito the next month.

==== Viva the Gangsta Rabbi ====
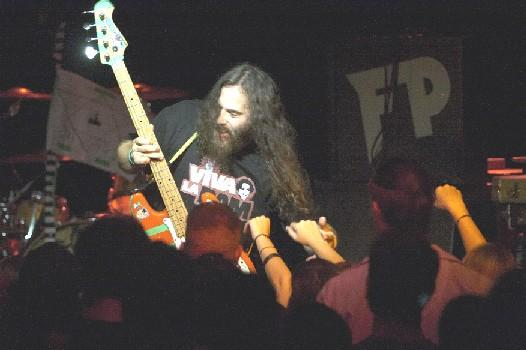
Steve Lieberman and his fans at the Downtown September 3, 2005

At the "Viva La Bam" show at the Downtown, Lieberman had stationed a portable cassette stationed at the end of the stage. He had the results mastered onto a CD which was released as Lieberman's 9th CD (2nd Live), called Viva the Gangsta Rabbi released January 6, 2006. A new local rock magazine was released by editor Tiffany Rizzano called Perpetual Toxins. She stated in the review that "Lieberman is a true rocker through and through ... borrowing a bit from experimental rockers Frank Zappa and Captain Beefheart, British punk rock, such as the Sex Pistols and even '80s hair metal ... He opened up the tune 'Bonkey on the Donkey' playing the flute, giving the song a bit of a Jethro Tull sound" and said his voice was more punk styled than Billie Joe when doing his songs in the "Green Day Medley".

=== 2006–2007 Melancholia Between the Pirates ===
Within two weeks of the "Viva La Bam" show, The Downtown closed down, destroying Lieberman's hope to do another show there. The Munchaba, where he was a regular, closed down the week before. These events as well as the poor reception to his 8th CD Punkifer (released October 25, 2005) caused Lieberman to sink into depression. Punkifer has songs such as "4-Hour Stiffy", "Fall Out Boy Oy Oy Oy" and the title song, a tribute to the vintage DOD distortion petal Lieberman used to create the bass sound of the CD, "so poorly distorted that every single smack of a bass chord is heard."

==== Jewish Pirate ====
By the fall of 2005, Lieberman began to spiral downward to his worst major depressive episode in over a decade. From this, he then suffered from writer's block, being totally unable to come up with a new song. He decided to record a CD of cover tunes and donate the gross proceeds to the North Shore Animal League, where he adopted his dogs, Buttons (1989–2004) in 1991 and Midnite Buttons (2004–2010) in 2004. Recorded December 2005, Jewish Pirate included songs originally done by Bruce Springsteen, Green Day, Jethro Tull, The Butthole Surfers, the Dead Milkmen, and the Grateful Dead amongst others, and was released on May 30, 2006, as his 10th CD. It became his first record to chart on WUSB FM where it hit No. 8 on October 27, 2006.

James McQuiston at NeuFutur Magazine said of Pirate, "The results are strong for that of a cover CD, and hopes Lieberman's future recordings will continue in such a direction."

In February 2006, Lieberman was featured on a 7-minute clip on Cablevision News 12. However it was only played between 11 am and 4 pm on a Wednesday, to a sparse audience.

==== Melancholia Falling ====
Coming out from a 5-month major depressive episode in the spring of 2006, Lieberman documents it in his first "concept" CD Melancholia Falling, his 11th CD released October 31, 2006. Syd Nathan of the Good Times Magazine said of Melancholia: "Perhaps the most bizarre recording ever to come across my desk... being an old fashioned concept album as it deals with the Rabbi's recent bout of depression and coming with an actual warning against suicide on the cd itself, as the main character takes his life, this is totally convoluted".

==== Last of the Jewish Pirates ====
The follow-up to 2006's Jewish Pirate, another covers CD for charity, his 12th, was released August 7, 2007.

==== Shake the Missile Base ====
On Shake The Missile Base, his 13th CD released November 6, 2007, the opening track "Public Suicide" exhibits Lieberman's failing mental health. As described by the chief editor of Smother.net Magazine, "A heavily distorted album as is the usual Lieberman fare, he distances himself from sunshine-laden lyrics for angry words of rage, heartache, suicide and depression". Jimmy Alvarado of razorcake.org – Punk Reviews said of Missile Base: "... some will undoubtedly see it as much ballyhooin’ and little talent, others will find a uniquely genius quality in the unpolished delivery of songs like 'Skinheads in My Yard Oy Vey,' 'Love @ Defcon 5,' and 'Rubbin’ One Out for My Baby.'"

=== 2008–2009 ===
In early 2008, complications from bipolar disorder got Steve Lieberman committed to the psychiatric ward in a local hospital. Being released in less than a week, in two months' time after that, he had returned to the stage, playing Farmingdale, New York's Crazy Donkey, where he cut himself on stage with a broken fiddle bow.

==== Psych Ward ====
After the experience of his confinement, Lieberman recorded his second concept album, his 14th CD Psych Ward, released June 8, 2008. Senior editor C.W. Ross at Indie Music Stop said "The songs' lyrics are a little tough to hear with talk of self-mutilation, cutting, death and suicide, but to get the point across, it's all necessary...Lieberman seems to exist to break the rules of writing, production and instrumentalization, playing a Jethro Tull-style flute and lead and rhythm bass with a vengeance".

==== Overthrow the Government ====
When completing work on his 15th CD, Overthrow the Government, released October 15, 2008, a commercial rock radio station was having a contest for players of miscellaneous instruments; the prize was to appear on stage at Madison Square Garden with Weezer. Lieberman submitted the flute intro to I'm Jethro Tull and took 60.4 percent of the vote and got to play the Garden on September 24, 2008.

"Lieberman has really started to fall into a groove with these last few recordings ... The music that Lieberman creates may be a little hard to get into, but the honesty of this work here is something that should be lauded and commended", said NeuFutur Magazine when reviewing the album.

Three months after the Weezer show, Lieberman was asked to return to the Crazy Donkey, this time to open for Andrew WK.

=== 2009–2011 JDub Records' Gangsta Rabbi ===
==== Diaspora-A Folk-Punk History of the Hebrew Nation ====
Setting out in the fall of 2008 to do a second concept CD, Steve Lieberman took on the history of the Jewish people. Starting with the call of Abraham, going through the Old Testament to the Holocaust and finishing with "4th Diaspora-The End Time", the underlying message is that so much misfortune befell the people because of their disobedience to God's Law.

Finishing the record in January 2009, at the same time the Israel-Gaza crisis erupted, Lieberman closed the album with the controversial "For the Children of the Gaza".

In a June 2009 review in RadioIndy, Lieberman received another comparison to fellow outsider musician Wesley Willis but "relying on shock and awe bursts of scorching bass licks and howls of reverent fury to trace the tormented Judaic arc from pre-biblical times to the 21st century".

Diaspora was Lieberman's 16th CD, released March 31, 2009.

==== DiKtatoR 17 ====
After numerous attempts to contact JDub Records, including sending a copy of Psych Ward in 2008 as well as inviting them to every big show he booked, in November 2009, Lieberman was contacted by the label, who invited him to sign a multi-album five-year deal. Lieberman always wanted to be on the label, as they had discovered Matisyahu and worked primarily with openly Jewish acts.

JDub hosted a Punk Purim party called "Hamanbashin" in February 2010, emceed by Sarah Lewitinn which Steve Lieberman opened for. Seven weeks later on April 20, 2010, JDub Records released the digital version of DiKtatoR 17, being the 27th of only 35 albums released in the label's history.

Lieberman visited the JDub offices in March 2011, when they planned to release Lieberman's CD's Jewish Engineer 18 and The Rabbi Is Dead during the summer of 2011 as well as a four-part documentary of his life called "A Punk Life: The Gangsta Rabbi Story". The video was released in 4 weekly segments starting on Lieberman's 53rd birthday June 21, 2011.

On July 12, 2011, the night after the last installment, "The Gangsta Rabbi's Studio" was released. JDub artists received a personal email from the Chief Operating Officer stating that after the label's nine-year existence, JDub Records was forced to close down citing financial reasons alone. The news went public the next day.

When interviewed by PunkTorah, Lieberman was asked about his plans following JDub's closing. Lieberman quipped, "I released the first sixteen [albums] on my own and will do the same for numbers nineteen through one hundred plus. As for a new label, I’ll be 104 when that happens..."

==== Jewish Engineer 18 ====
Following the formula of DiKtatoR 17, Steve Lieberman produced and physically released his 18th CD Jewish Engineer 18 (a reference to the accounting profession) on July 6, 2010. When presenting the 20-song CD to JDub for digital release, he was told the release must wait because DiKtatoR was released less than three months before.

The song "I'm Not A White Boy" hit No. 1 on SoundClick.com alternative chart in July 2010, and received an International Association of Independent Recording Artists IAIRA International Top 10 Award.

=== 2011–2012 My Magic Last Days ===
==== The Rabbi Is Dead ====
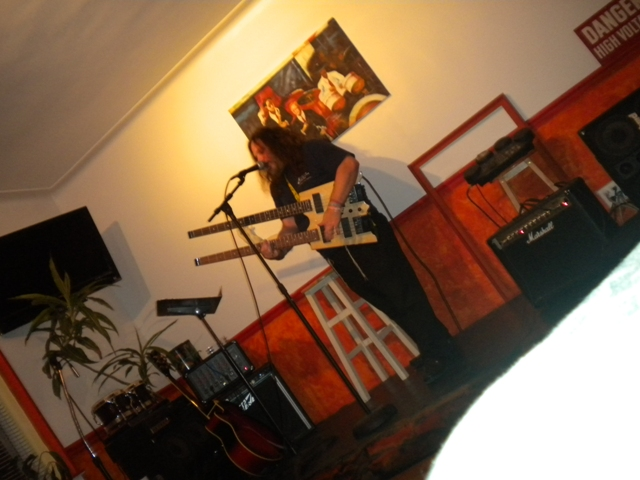
Steve Lieberman plays his 2-headed 50 fret OktoBass

Presenting his most commercial effort to JDub Records in March 2011 and the first where Lieberman plays the 6-string guitar, he was advised to trim down the 22-song CD to 12 or 13 tracks which he did. He released the 13 track CD independently on July 19, 2011, because of the demise of JDub Records.

==== My Last Rock Show ====
After the release of The Rabbi Is Dead, Lieberman was diagnosed with myeloproliferative bone marrow cancer and knew he would soon be unable to perform on stage or in the studio. He put together a final tour which was documented in his 20th CD My Last Rock Show, released February 7, 2012. Although poorly produced from cassette masters,My Last Rock Show included tracks of Lieberman as he was backed by a full punk band and a performance of The Dreidel Song at a government-sponsored Hanukkah show.

==== My Magic Last Days ====
Production and release of the next album, his 21st, originally to be called My Magic Tragic Last Days, but later shortened to My Magic Last Days was delayed because Lieberman was unable to work on it due to the quick progression of the disease. It was finally released on July 17, 2012. Although most reviewers shied away from it, it was one of Lieberman's best received albums.

The album peaked at No. 33 after a lack-luster journey through the bottom of the chart on KZSU on April 21, 2013

=== 2013–2014 They Got Me Confined to the Cancer Ward ===
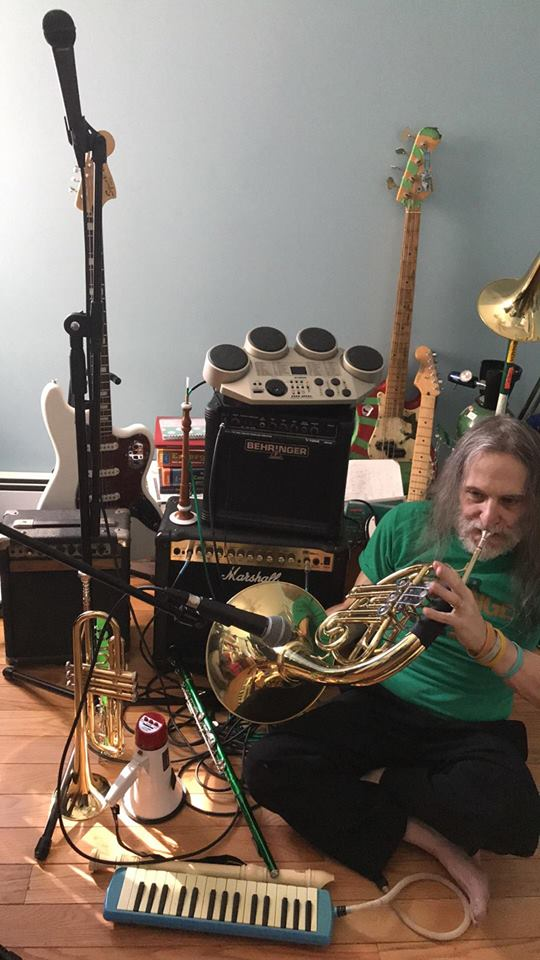
The Gangsta Rabbi plays the French Horn, spring 2018

==== Cancer Ward ====
In May 2012, after the production of My Magic Last Days was completed, for the first time since 1985, Lieberman retired from making music altogether due to his progressing cancer. In October of that year, damage from Hurricane Sandy destroyed many of his instruments and equipment but spared his Korg D1600 recording board. In the spring of 2013, after a year of suspending cancer treatment, his case was taken on by Memorial Sloan-Kettering. A bone-marrow biopsy determined he suffered from myelofibrosis, a condition where a once prolific marrow turns to fiber and slowly stops producing blood cells. In September 2013, Lieberman began undergoing experimental chemotherapy with a drug known only as AUY-922 lasting six months in an effort to reverse progression and to bring back an earlier stage of the disease. Instead of having any sort of beneficial effect, the treatment actually progressed the disease, causing Lieberman to be hospitalized frequently, receiving forty-five transfusions between February and December 2014. However, in November 2013, Lieberman rose from his sick-bed to do a quick cover of "My Kingdom" by Echo and the Bunnymen, his first new output since the My Magic Last Days sessions in May 2012. The disease's progression eventually caused Lieberman's retirement from his 29-year stint as Comptroller for the Village of Freeport.

==== Return of the Jewish Pirate (3rd to 6th Pirate) ====
At the end of his radio interview on December 30, 2014, Lieberman promised to try and release a follow-up to 2007's Last of the Jewish Pirates to be entitled Return of the Jewish Pirate. At project's end, he had released a 76-song, 4 volume set on May 19, 2015, the 70th birthday of one of his greatest heroes Pete Townshend. Due to the overall length of the last "Pirate" series, Lieberman was not able to get press on the collection after its release.

=== 2015–2022 Symphonic Punk, Thrash-Opera and The Noise Militia ===
By early 2018, Lieberman, began producing his most prolific, complex and sometimes most experimental music of his career. Drawing on his experience in symphonic, marching and jazz bands and orchestras decades earlier as well as a need to break the rules of mainstream music of instrumentation and production, Lieberman had arranged orchestral parts to blend with his punk/thrash style, fusing it to progressive rock, opera (recreating a fully orchestrated three-hour version of Gilbert and Sullivan's HMS Pinafore) and his classical punk/thrash fusion The Gangsta Rabbi's Thrash Opus Year 1812 Festival Overture in E♭ Major, lasting 38 minutes. On March 12, 2019, he finished his first epic project, "La Symphonie-Thrashe du Professeur-Juif Rebele" (the thrash symphony for the Gangsta Rabbi), where he arranged, orchestrated and recorded playing 18 different instruments over forty opuses, based on his punk catalog running over five hours long.

=== Commercial and College Radio reception ===
Although Lieberman's music seemingly had little commercial success, unaudited download and stream sales of his first 40 records approached 20,000,000 in 22 years as of July 2023. In September 2018, Lieberman's single, "The Diarrhea Song" had briefly appeared on the Apple iTunes Top 100 UK Rock chart, peaking at No. 22 and "3 Little Puppies" peaked at No. 19 on the Apple iTunes Top 100 Other Territories Chart two years later. l.He received airplay on Rich Russo's free-form Anything Anything with Rich Russo radio show on New York City WRXP 101.9 and WDHA-FM 105.5 commercial rock radio stations. Throughout the shows Lieberman's music was featured on, Russo described him as "Jethro Tull meets the Beastie Boys, a one-man Jethro Tull" as well as "an inspiration to all suffering from serious illness" Additionally, Lieberman enjoyed some success on college radio, where The Rabbi Is Dead peaked at No. 3 on KZSU Stanford University in 2012 and "Jewish Pirate" had a one-week appearance at No. 8 on WUSB (FM) Stony Brook University two years after release in 2008.

=== The Jethro Tull / Gangsta Rabbi Connection ===
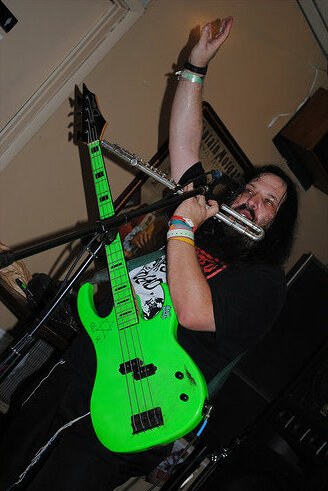
Steve Lieberman plays one-handed flute solo at a punk rock show April 24, 2010

Being a long-haired male rock flutist, playing in a style inspired by Ian Anderson, the connection between Steve Lieberman and British rock band Jethro Tull was established as soon as the 2002 release of Bad'lania Rising. It has songs entitled "Ian Anderson" (1999), "Punk Rock Jethro Tull Song" (2001), "Jethro Tull FantasyKamp" (2004) and "I'm Jethro Tull" (2008), with the A.M.G. placing Jethro Tull as a similar artist on the page of Steve Lieberman the Gangsta Rabbi. This connection brought reaction to both sides of the Jethro Tull community, those who hate Lieberman and those who love him.

The former is evident on one Jethro Tull covers site. A critic says this of Lieberman's covers of Tull's "War Child", "Up To Me" and "One Brown Mouse": "I have no idea what drives Lieberman to release this unapproachable stuff and why he chose Jethro Tull as a target."

On a site called the Jethro Tull Board which is actually endorsed by Ian Anderson, there is a thread called "Gangsta Rabbinian" saying "I love your innovative and original Jethro Tull-related songs, and your non-Tull songs are great too" and posted the lyrics to two of Lieberman's lyrics which express hope to find a peaceful end to the Arab-Israeli conflict, "Unholy War In The Holy Land" (2004) and "For The Children of the Gaza" (2009).

== Discography ==
=== Studio albums ===
- Bad'lania Rising (2002) (Reached No. 82 on iTunes Italy Rock Chart on September 19, 2021)
- Jewish Lightning (2003)
- Desert Fever Brigade (2003)
- Liquidatia-455 (2004)
- Arbeiter at the Gate (2004)
- Jew in the Underground (2005)
- Punkifier (2005)
- Jewish Pirate (2006)
- Melancholia Falling (2006)
- Last of the Jewish Pirates (2007)
- Shake the Missile Base (2007)
- Psych Ward (2008)
- Overthrow the Government (2008)
- Diaspora (2009)
- Diktator 17 (2009, 2010)
- Jewish Engineer 18 (2010)
- The Rabbi Is Dead (2011)
- My Magic Last Days (2012)
- Cancer Ward (2014)
- Return Of the Jewish Pirate (2015)
- .....Volume 1–3rd Pirate-Obscurities And Near-Misses
- ..... Volume 2–4th Pirate-Hits And Near-Hits
- ..... Volume 3–5th Pirate-Epics And Not-So-Epics
- ..... Volume 4–6th Pirate-Plunder And Miscellaneous Booty
- Blast-O-Rama (2015)
- Terminator V617-F (2016)
- The Gangsta Rabbi's Quadrophenia (2016)
- The Gangsta Rabbi's Tommy (2016)
- The Gangsta Rabbi's Aqualung (2016)
- Down with a Bang #29 (2016)
- The King Of Jewish Punk (#30/68) (2017)
- 2nd King Of Jewish Punk (#31/69)-The Last of the Great Punk Rock Bass Heroes (2017)
- Bad'lania Is Still Rising: 3rd King Of Jewish Punk (#32/70) (2017)
- Bad'lania Is Still Rising: A Protest Against My Own Rebellion (#33/71) (2017)
- Psycho At The Hospice Gates (#34/72) (2017)
- The Thrash Opera's (#35/73) (2018)
- Mixtape For My Funeral (#36/74) (2018)
- La Symphonie-Thrash du Professeur-Juif Rebele (37/75) (2019)
- The Noise Militia (#38/76) (2020)
- .....The Noise Militia (#38/76) Part 1
- .....Part 2-The Never-Ending Punk Street Parade...
- .....Part 3-The Civil Assault of the Bad'lanian/The Pogo-March Will Continue
- .....Part 4-The Nazarite's Pillar of Noise/In Pure Distortion/The Everlasting Militia of Peace and Metal Street Cadence-The Longest Song Ever
- .....Part 5-Now I Will Bless the L-rd As He Gave Me The Power To Do All This in the 11th Year of My Suffering
- .....Part 6-Blessed Is The L-rd As He Raised Me From My Deathbed To Do History's Longest Song
- The Post-Militia Pogo-Battalion (#39/77) (2021–2022)
- .....The 1st Noise Cadence
- .....The 2nd Noise Cadence-My Reclamation of My World Record Continues
- .....The 3rd Noise Cadence-This Time, I Will Bless The L-rd
- .....The 4th Noise Cadence-Leukemia Awareness
- .....The 5th Noise Cadence-Play Some Music
- .....The 6th Noise Cadence-In The 12th Year of My Suffering
- .....The 7th Noise Cadence-Bad'lanian Public Works Project
- .....The 8th Noise Cadence-Bombast In The Mosh-Pit
- .....The 9th Noise Cadence-2nd World Record 3473
- 4th King of Jewish Punk-With a Pillar of Sound I Praise the L-rd (#41/79) (Opus #138) (2023)
- 5th King of Jewish Punk-The Duke of the Militia (#42/80) (Opus #139) (2023)
- With a Pillar of Sound, I Praise the L-rd (2024)
- Meet the Gangsta Rabbi (#44/82) (2024)
- The Duke of the Militia (#45/83) (2025)
- Riot In Your SpeakerBox (#46/84) (2025)
- Wowwing Them With Distortion (#47/85) (2025)
- Still Not Good Enough (#48/86) (2025)
- Cheap Japanese Bass-1st Aria (1971-1975) (#49/87) (2025)
- Suicide Shift (#50/88)
- Noise Riot in the Diaspora (#51/89)
- Cheap Japanese Bass-2nd Aria -1975 (#52/90) (2025)
- Peace Over Babylon (#53/91) (2025)
- Striking Down the Persecutor (#54/92) (2025)
- Minority in the Hebrew Race (#55/93) (2026)
- I'm the Brand-new Regime (#56/94) (2026)

=== Live albums ===
- Jewish Riot Oy! Oy! Oy! (2005)
- Viva the Gangsta Rabbi (2006)
- My Last Rock Show (2012)

==== Studio cassettes ====
- Bang the Bass Bopmania (1991)
- Bop The Referendum (1992)
- Tails From The BopSide (1992)
- BopZone Distributor (1992)
- Resurgence In The FaKtory #5 (1993)
- Labourer #6 (1993)
- Velociraptor Factor #7 (1993)
- Planet Bab-'eL #8 (1993)
- Poverty #9 (1994)
- Recession #10 (1994)
- Liquidation #11 (1994)
- Yom Ha-Sho'ah Bab-'eL #12 (1994)
- Zionist #13 (1994)
- Tolerance #14 (1994)
- YeruBab-'eL/The Underground Resistance #15 (1995)
- Desolation #16 (1995)
- Mishneh ha-Redaktor #17 (1995)
- Diaspora #18 (1995)
- Tblisi #19 (1995)
- Gangsta Rabbi #20 (1996)
- Delivering The Reprimand #21 (1996)
- 57-Bad'lan-7 #22 (1996)
- Gomorrah 5750 #23 (1996)
- Powderkeg M'Shar'et #24 (1996)
- Slamming The Mercenary #25 (1997)
- Terror Mis-ab'ib #26 (1997)
- Bondsman #27 (1998)
- Upper Desert Discourse #28 (1998)
- Bad'lanian Public Works #29 (1998)
- My Magic Last Days #30 (1999)
- Y3.451K-No Problem #31 (1999)
- Laboured All These Years #32 (1999)
- Servitorship #33 (2000)
- Bop Gun '451 #34 (2000)
- The Noisy Minority #35 (2000)
- Diaspora Blaster #36 (2001)
- Fire Sale Box Set #37 (2001)
- Ashes of Bad'lania #38 (2001)
- Public Kennel Wagging #39 (CD-2002)

==== Live cassettes ====
- Mission of Tolerance 5755 (1995)
- Ministering The Badlan'im (1996)
- Berlin 3451 (2000)

=== Singles ===
- G-d Loves Me Tho' I'm Crazy (2008)
- Crank That Kosher Boy (2009)
- Jewish Boy in the Mosh-Pit (2010)
- We're All Derek Jeter (2011)
- Get Off The Bus! (2014)
- My Last Chanukah (2014)
- My Gallant Crew/ I Am The Captain of the Pinafore (2018)
- The Diarrhea Song (2018)
- Joy To the World (2018)
- Eat Poop and Die/The Spirit of Rebellion(Symphonic Punk #1) (2018)
- 1st Entr'acte (#38/76)-The Bombshelter, Now a Mosh-Pit and I'm A Frickin' Star (2020)
- 2nd Entr'acte (#39/77)-The Silo Malfunctions-'14–'18 War Pogo-Battalion-No Quarantine (2021)
- Opus #91–2nd Aria-Thorn of Crowns (2021)
- Radar Love (2022)
- Police Officer/Gimme No Producer (2022)
- I'll Overthrow The Government For You (Bloodless Coup d'état 3472) (2022)
- Entr'acte #116-Dimplicity (2022)
- Bungle In The Jungle/Publicity Man (from Opus 120, Aria's 1–2 Post-Militia Pogo-Battalion(#39/77)(2022)
- My Whiz Kaleefa (2022)
- Me & Suzy-Suzy in the Woozatoria (2022)
- Bank-Robber (2022)
- Ana'mika (A Duchess in a Time of Peace) (2023)
- Forgotten Years (2023)
- ¿ What is Life? (2023)
- No Holocaust Under My Watch/Oy!Oy!Oy!-Stop The Hate(Entr'acte #156) (2024)
- Resistance Against the Hate (2024)
- The Bass Player and The Quarterback (2024)
- Ward 67 (2024)
- Hey There Laura (2025)
- I'm Going Home (Entr'acte #206)"(2025)

== Videos ==
- "Steve Lieberman Demonstrates the 18 instruments he plays on his 2019 symphony" (November 2018)
- "The DiKtatoR" Live 20 March 2010
- "Wish You Were Here" (2007)
- "Dogpark" (Live) 14 April 2008
- "Star-Spangled Banner on 4-String Bass" (2009)
- "Gangsta Rabbi" (song) Live in Detroit (2004)
- "Punk Rock Memorial Day on Oktobass" 30 May 2011

== Gear ==
=== Live stage gear ===
- Custom 2-Headed Oktobass
- 2006 Dean Nuclear Green Zone Bass
- Marshall MG30 Guitar Amp y-connected with
- Gallien-Kruger Backline 112 Bass amp
- Armstrong Model 1042H Curve Headed Flute
- Yamaha DD9 Drum Machine
- Various Recorders and Whistles

== Rock And Metal Instruments ==
- 2022 Squier Precision Bass
- 2024 Tascam 24 SD Multi-Track Recorder
- 2023 Squier Right-handed VI Guitar
- 2013 Fender Stratocaster Left-handed Guitar
- 2024 Shure SM-58 Microphone
- 2023 Suzuki melodion
- 2024 Danelectro Baby Sitar
- Yamaha DD20 dDD9 and DD6 Drum Machines

== Brass Instruments ==
- Contra-bass trombone
- Bass trombone
- Tenor trombone
- Alto trombone
- Soprano trombone
- Valve tenor trombone
- Compensating euphoniuum
- Trumpets
- French horns (F and Bb)
- Concert Mellophone

== Woodwind Instruments ==
- Bass Clarinet
- Sopranino clarinet (Eb)
- clarinet(Bb)
- Soprano Saxophone
- Flutes
- Basset Clarinet in G

== Recorders ==
- bass
- tenor
- -alto
- tenor
- Soprano
- sopranino

== Exotic Instruments ==
- didgerioo
- talabard (bombard)
- Mangal Vadya
- serpent
- xylophone
- shofar

s
