= My Magic Last Days =

Studio album by Steve Lieberman
- Released: 17 July 2012
- Recorded: July 2010 – June 2012
- Genre: Punk rock, garage, obscuro, industrial, dance, progressive rock, PitBash
- Length: 72:38
- Label: JDub
- Producer: Steve Lieberman

Steve Lieberman chronology
My Last Rock Show (2012)	My Magic Last Days (2012)	Cancer Ward (2014)

My Magic Last Days is a punk-rock, garage, Jewish, industrial dance album, the 21st CD from Jewish-American, bi-polar outsider punk musician, Steve Lieberman, released on 17 July 2012, when he was 54 years old.It was frequently released as a double-record set with My Last Rock Show(2012), in an effort to document the artist's final days on earth through his music. At the time of release, Lieberman's bone-marrow cancer and chemotherapy treatment had progressed to a point where he was forced to retire from decades of live performances and suffered much sickness during the recording and production of My Magic Last Days.

== Critical reception ==
=== Martin Atkins ===
Martin Atkins had said in his review of My Magic Last Days--"Remember when songs were great and catchy and made you feel good without pandering and such?---This is full of f-ck-off punk with attitude to spare!--Steve Lieberman--Ich Liebe Dich~! "

Rating 131 Stars out of 140

=== Alex Henderson ===
"Various musicians have made recordings while suffering major illnesses, quite often having a wistful, introspective quality. But My Magic Last Days is a very noisy, in-your-face cd, rocking angrily and aggressively, recalling the primal rawness of early American and British punk. Lieberman additionally gets a lot of inspirationfrom thrash metal, hard rock and industrial rock, he occasionally employs a Euro-disco/Euro-Dance beat, but without sacrificing his punk and metal appeal....My Magic Last Days does not pretend to be mainstream in any way. The cd is defiantly uncommercial as it is eccentric--a snarling sensory assault!"

Rating: 3.0 Stars out of 5

=== James McQuiston ===
"Blending the gritty sound of late-eighties industrial with hints of psychedelic and new-wave...having a bouncy feel, allowing Lieberman's pointed commentary and flutes to shine. Lieberman's desire to keep things fresh needs to be lauded.My Magic Last Days is one of the best of Lieberman's titles we've reviewed. A really great album could follow.

Rating: 6.8 Stars out of 10

== Track listing ==
All tracks are written by Steve Lieberman except where noted.

No.	Title	Length
1.	"Mourn For Me Like the Prophet"	5:53
2.	"Crotch Rocket"	3:38
3.	"Hal'lel 63"	6:47
4.	"My Last Blast"	3:35
5.	"Red Rubber Ball" (Paul Simon, Bruce Woodley)	3:27
6.	"Apocalypse For Most"	3:52
7.	"Keith Gave Me a 1/2* Review"	2:54
8.	"I Wanna Be Clare Burson"	3:44
9.	"We're All Derek Jeter"	3:22
10.	"Puppy In A Cup"	2:59
11.	"I Hate The State"	6:49
12.	"They Milked His Aorta La La La"	2:26
13.	"The Meat I Eat"	3:40
14.	"Suzy Q's And Crack-Whores"	2:45
15.	"Jorge Posada BobbleHead"	4:20
16.	"It's Hard To Rock In the Eastern Bloc"	3:43
17.	"I Hate The State Comptroller"	3:53
18.	"My Wiz Khalifa"	4:51

== Personnel ==
- Steve Lieberman - bass guitar, guitar, vocals, flutes, recorders, trombone, melodica, beatmachines

== Singles ==
Year	Title	Peak chart positions			Charts	Download Sales
Year	Title	Soundclick Main Genre	Soundclick Subgenre	Broadjam	Charts	Download Sales
2011	"Crotch Rocket"	32	3	1	Metal/Industrial Metal/New Wave	8,007
2012	"We're All Derek Jeter"	55	2	—	Alternative/Post-Punk	4,971
2012	"Puppy In A Cup"	30	3	—	Alternative/Avant-Rock	7,033
2012	"Mourn For Me Like The Prophet"	57	4	5	Alternative/Rock-Gothic	3,531
2012	"My Last Blast"	23	1	-	Metal/Thrash Metal	4,250
2012	"Hal'lel 63"	52	1	-	Alternative/Dance-Punk	2,668
2012	"I Hate The State"	25	1	-	Alternative/Dance-Punk	4,158
