= Arbeiter at the Gate =

Arbeiter At The Gate

Studio album by Steve Lieberman
- Released: 18 October 2004
- Recorded: April – July 2004
- Genres: Punk rock, Garage, Obscuro, PitBash, Progressive Rock
- Length: 63:36
- Label: Bad'lan USA
- Producer: Steve Lieberman

Steve Lieberman chronology
Liquidatia 455 (2004)	Arbeiter At The Gate (2004)	Jew In The Underground (2005)

Arbeiter At the Gate is a post-punk, experimental noise-rock album. It was the fifth album released by Jewish-American outsider musician, Steve Lieberman on 18 October 2004. He was 46 years old when the CD was released.

The album title is a play on a Biblical verse in Isaiah 29:21 ' (the wicked) lay a snare for the arbiter (judge) at the gate' (by changing to "arbeiter" it becomes Yiddish for "worker").

Of Lieberman's 22 releases to date, Arbeiter At The Gate still remains a top album pick of the AllMusic Guide

Arbeiter had charted on a number of college radio stations, most notably peaking at #42 on WXDU Duke University and #87 at KZSU Stanford University.

It was while on tour for the Arbeiter album that a reporter from Newsday interviewed Lieberman at one of his shows and stated that the essence of his music is (Lieberman's) message and emotion, not his talent in an article about outsider musicians on Long Island published on 27 February 2005.

The record is considered darker than his works preceding Arbeiter as Lieberman suffered a bi-polar dark cycle through much of the cd's production, dealing with the illness of his beloved Labrador mix Buttons, who passed just before Arbeiter's release.

== Critical reception ==
Greg McIntish from AllMusic wrote: ' A lo-fi sonic sock in the gut built around Lieberman's ultra-fuzzed-out bass, multitudinous flute overdubs and other sundry sounds. Certainly outsider music there's no doubting that Lieberman's sound is unique, but like such artists as Wesley Willis it is completely stagnant... Mostly, the appeal of Arbeiter At The Gate and all of Lieberman's work is the sheer and impressive fearlessness of it. Rating 3.5 Stars out of 5

NeuFutur Magazine's James McQuiston noted: 'Although vocally, sometimes achieving an Ozzy-like inflection, the production and mixing of Arbeiter is almost painful to listen to because of the overdoing of the cheesy distortion Lieberman loves... Steve is unique, that much can be said. He's trying to make a coherent yet different album which doesn't necessarily make for solid, listenable music. But i sense here an evolution that eventually, we could get a solid album from him. Rating 4.0 Stars Out of 10.

== Track listing ==
All tracks are written by Steve Lieberman except where noted.

No.	Title	Length
1.	"Rock Me In The Bomb-shelter"	3:27
2.	"My Call-girl"	4:01
3.	"Tie Me Kangaroo Down Sport" (Harris, Rolf)	4:45
4.	"Zionist"	3:57
5.	"Hippy In The Middle"	4:15
6.	"A Dose of Viagra"	2:02
7.	"Freak of the Week"	2:18
8.	"All-Day Media Player"	3:46
9.	"Bullet For the Arbeiter"	2:52
10.	"Father Daughter Dance" (Lieberman, Steve, Lieberman, Rebekah)	3:36
11.	"Desert Viet-Nam 2004"	3:52
12.	"Taber'ah"	4:23
13.	"The A.M.G."	2:37
14.	"Counting Skinheads in Adventureland"	3:57
15.	"Bumper Car Spring-Green #5"	7:59
16.	"Gin'ot For Buttons/Alive At My Own Funeral"	4:55

== Personnel ==
- Steve Lieberman - bass guitar, vocals, flutes, recorder, trombone, melodica, beatmachines, fiddle, bombard, shahnai, bagpipe chanter, tin whistles, zurna
