= Diktator 17 =

DiKtatoR 17

Studio album by Steve Lieberman the Gangsta Rabbi
- Released: 17 November 2009 (physical), 20 April 2010 (digital)
- Recorded: September 2008 – October 2009
- Genres: Punk rock, Jewish, Obscuro, PitBash
- Length: 77:13
- Labels: JDub, Bad'lan USA
- Producer: Steve Lieberman

Steve Lieberman the Gangsta Rabbi chronology
Diaspora (2009)	DiKtatoR 17 (2009)	Jewish Engineer 18 (2010)

DiKtatoR 17 is a punk rock/Jewish album, first released independently by outsider musician Steve Lieberman (The Gangsta Rabbi) (born 1958) as his 17th album on 17 November 2009. Shortly after, Lieberman, then age 51 was signed to Jewish Independent Label, JDub Records for a multi-album deal who released DiKtatoR 17 as their 27th release out of 35 on 20 April 2010.

Both the lead-off single "Obama-Rama Yeah!" and "Little Kosher Girl"

from the cd reached the #1 position on SoundClick.com's Global Alternative genre charts which hosts 176,000 songs.

Track #8 on the cd, "I Wish That I Was Hot" received airplay on the "Anything Anything" radio program before the release of DiktatoR 17 on commercial rock radio WRXP 101.9 New York City where DJ Rich Russo described Lieberman as 'Jethro Tull meets the Beastie Boys'.

== Critical reception ==
The critics' reviews on DikTatoR 17 were mixed

Senior Editor C.W. Ross at IndieStop/CD Reviewer says 'I respect the fact that Lieberman is not afraid to tackle any subject matter in the songs on this album, from his struggles with bi-polar depression, pride in Jewish heredity, anti-racism, politics, sex and animal rights....his flute work hearkens up Jethro Tull and his overdriven bass sounds give the cd a different edge.-what he plays is what you hear... Like all of Lieberman's, you'll either appreciate the raw experimental raw-edge style he delivers, or you'll think he's a total madman, either way, you'll walk away with a very strong opinion of what you just heard... Rating: 8.1/10

Carly Doenges of MuzikReviews said of DiKtatoR 17 ' Have you ever heard a song on the radio and wonder how that artist ever got a record contract? That's the feeling I get when listening to Steve Lieberman the Gangsta Rabbi's latest DiKtatoR 17...If Lieberman is going for any kind of wit or social commentary, the message is lost as the lyrics are too difficult to understand...although (DiKtator 17) was the album that got Lieberman signed to JDub Records, have a listen and decide for yourself whether it was from talent or just sheer persistence' Rating: 0.5/5.0

In his 2009 review of DiKtator 17, writer Wildy Haskell states 'Steve Lieberman AKA The Gangsta Rabbi is about as eclectic as they come. While he could be dismissed as a novelty, he is a genuine street poet speaking the vernacular that exists in the ghetto...DiKtatoR 17 could be the best Lieberman ever did, because the humanity in his music is getting more and more human with time. Rating 4 Stars out of 5

== Track listing ==
All tracks are written by Steve Lieberman except where noted.

No.	Title	Length
1.	"Obama-Rama, Yeah!"	4:29
2.	"The Labourer"	3:03
3.	"We Have No Rights!"	3:21
4.	"The Diktator"	3:28
5.	"Terrorist"	3:14
6.	"Little Kosher Girl"	3:13
7.	"Crank That Kosher Boy"	3:07
8.	"I Wish That I Was Hot"	2:35
9.	"Walder'ah (The Happy Wanderer)" (Ridge, Moller)	3:17
10.	"Pay To Play"	3:42
11.	"Sunrise Sunset" (Bock, Harnick)	5:25
12.	"Should Have Been A Musician"	3:53
13.	"Ohav'im Kelev'im"	5:01
14.	"Uprising In The Diaspora"	3:04
15.	"If I Asked you To Be My Lover"	3:22
16.	"Pinata Boy"	3:24
17.	"Alprazalam"	2:40
18.	"Poopin' At Work (Edit 2)"	3:08
19.	"Nobody Really Hates The Beatles"	3:19
20.	"G-d Loves Me Tho' I'm crazy"	3:47
21.	"Landfill"	3:19
22.	"Novelty Hit"	3:18

== Personnel ==
- Steve Lieberman - bass guitars, vocals, flutes, recorders, trombone, melodica, beatmachines

== Videos ==
- "The Labourer" live 2010 on YouTube
- "The DiKtatoR" live 2010 on YouTube
- "Pay To Play" live 2010 on YouTube
