= Sagol 59 =

Israeli musician

Sagol 59 סגול 59
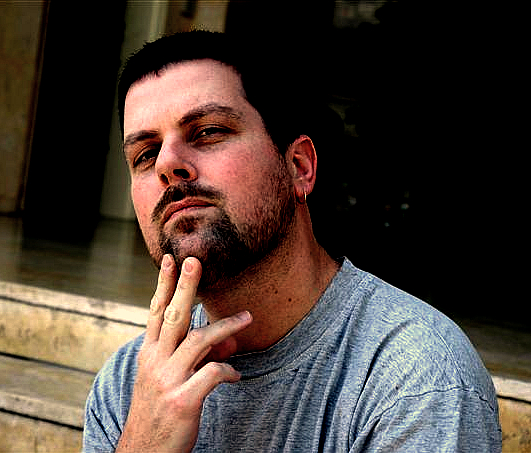

Background information
- Born: Khen Rotem; October 1, 1968 (age 58); Israel
- Genres: Hip hop; rock
- Occupations: Rapper; singer; songwriter; guitarist
- Instrument: Guitar
- Years active: 2000–present
- Label: JDub
- Website: Sagol59.com

Khen Rotem, known by his stage name Sagol 59 (Hebrew: סגול 59; born on October 1, 1968), is an Israeli rapper, singer, songwriter and guitarist. He is best known for being a Jerusalem-based hip-hop MC and has been hailed as the "Israeli godfather of hip hop." He also writes about music for many Israeli publications, including Haaretz and the Tel Aviv guide City Mouse. He also teaches Rap and Hip Hop classes at the Rimon School of Jazz and Contemporary Music.

== Biography ==
=== Personal life ===
Rotem was born in Israel and raised on a kibbutz, Ein HaHoresh. He served for three years in the Israel Defense Forces. His political views have been described as left wing, although he says, "I try to look at things from the human side and not so much the political side."

He grew up listening to and playing rock and blues music, and was first exposed to hip hop in the late-80s. In 1991-92 he lived in England, where he first heard Ice Cube's Death Certificate, which he says is the record that made him “in awe of this whole hip hop thing.” He took the name Sagol 59 ("Purple 59") from his kibbutz laundry tag identification code.

=== Career ===
In 2000, Sagol 59 released The Blue Period, the first album by a solo hip hop artist in Israel. His first four albums and an EP were released in Israel, and are now available in the US online. On each album, he re-recorded a classic hip hop track in an Israeli version. On 2006's Hip Hop Einstein, for instance, he re-did "The Message" by Grandmaster Flash and the Furious Five, with new lyrics to reflect the Israeli reality. In 2008, Sagol was signed to JDub Records, releasing Make Room, his first American project. Two years later, the label put out a digital album consisting of remixes, b-sides, rare and unreleased tracks from the first decade of Sagol's career.

Sagol went on the JDub 5th Anniversary tour (in Brooklyn, Denver, Cleveland and Los Angeles) in 2008, and performed at the 2010 CMJ Music Marathon in New York.

2011 saw the release of Another Passenger, an album on which Sagol returned to his blues-rock-folk roots. Another Passenger, produced by Amir Estlein, features Sagol singing and playing guitar, alongside notable Israeli musicians such as Geva Alon, Rona Keinan, Dan Toren, Jazz saxophonist Albert Begger, members of Red Band and poet Ronnie Someck. In the Spring of 2012, Sagol was featured on Jenerous Skillz, a digitally released global Jewish Hip Hop album, that he also executive produced. In August 2012, Sagol released the track "Westerns", a collaboration with New York rapper Kool G Rap.

Sagol collaborated with Israeli-American folk singer Ami Yares on the 2015 album The Promised Land: The Grateful Dead / Jerry Garcia Hebrew Project, featuring Hebrew language covers of songs by The Grateful Dead and Jerry Garcia. Sagol conceived of the project in 2013, and spent approximately 18 months translating the lyrics from English into Hebrew. It is the first ever album of Hebrew versions of Grateful Dead songs. In December 2015, Sagol and Yares embarked on a U.S. tour of the project, which included shows in Minneapolis-St. Paul, Atlanta, Baltimore, Philadelphia, New Jersey and New York. In March 2017, Sagol embarked on a U.S. tour, which included performances at the Atlanta Jewish Music Festival, New York City's Pinks, The Deanery in Brooklyn and Garcia's at The Capitol Theatre (Port Chester, New York). In June 2018, Sagol performed an acoustic set of Promised Land songs at the Article 24 club in Boston, MA. In March 2020, Sagol went on another Promised Land U.S. tour, which saw him and several American musicians perform two shows in Washington D.C, a show in Flemington, NJ and a show at the Nublu club in NYC's East Village. In June 2024, Sagol performed a Promised Land set as the headliner of the Boulder Jewish Music Festival in Boulder, Colorado.

In December 2018, Sagol released a joint album with Israeli rapper and comedian Lukach. The album, Plouging in the Mud, which appeared under the pseudonym The Work Managers, parodies the Country & Western style of music, and was done all in Hebrew. On June 10, 2019, Sagol emerged with a new Hip Hop album, Pirkey Avot (Veteran Joints), which showcased, alongside Sagol, a variety of notable Israeli M.Cs and producers. thReEMIXes, an E.P which featured three official remixes to tracks from Veteran Joints, was released to streaming services in October 2019. thREeMIXes II followed in December 2019.

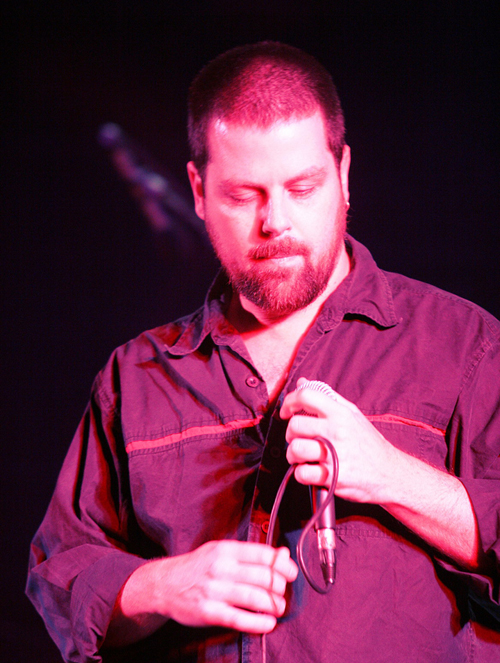
Sagol 59 performing in Tel Aviv, 2012.

In November 2021, Sagol released The Father, The Son and The Mayor, the first ever album by an Israeli solo rapper/M.C to be released in vinyl LP format. The album, released by Kame'a Music, contained nine tracks and featured renowned Israeli vocalists Dana Berger and Echo, among others. In January 2022 Sagol released "Judoka", a song performed in both Hebrew and Arabic in collaboration with Arab Muslim rapper Hasan M.C.

On August 4, 2023, Sagol released his ninth full-length Hip Hop album, Millennial Dinosaur, which featured collaborations with several acclaimed Israeli MCs and Producers. The album was released to all streaming services and was also issued as a limited-edition vinyl LP. The E.P "Dinosaur Remixed", released on February 25, 2024, featured new remixes for tracks from "Dinosaur Millennial", made by some of Israel's most renowned Hip Hop beatmakers.

In June 2025, to mark 25 years of activity, Sagol released "Lost Bars", a rarities collection with hard-to-find songs, spanning the years 2000 to 2025, featuring some of Israel's most acclaimed rappers and producers, including Shaanan Streett (of Hadag Nahash), Ortega, Mayor, Lukach, Shachar Hasson, Johnny Goldstein, Mayor, Shiroto and many more. "Bars Only", a joint E.P with acclaimed producer Luqman, followed in July 2025. 59420, an E.P with producer Ninja420 and featuring several notable guest M.Cs, was released in October 2025.

=== Political efforts ===
Fellow Israelis Sagol and Sha'anan Streett of Hadag Nahash created controversy in 2001 by teaming up with Palestinian rapper Tamer Nafar (aka TN, of the group DAM) on "Summit Meeting", which was the first ever Jewish-Arab hip hop collaboration. Released during the Second Intifada, the song called on leaders of both nations to resume peace talks. Since then, Sagol has been involved in endeavors designed to promote peace and unity between Jews and Muslims, appearing on mixed bills such as 2004's JDub Unity Sessions in Brooklyn with Matisyahu and TN; 2006's Rap for Justice in Amsterdam with DAM and Ramallah Underground; the Hip Hop Sulha in New York and San Francisco, described as an Israeli and Palestinian hip hop showcase; frequently collaborating with Arab-Israeli rapper Saz; and, along with Daniel Sieradski (aka Mobius), organizing Corner Prophets, a cultural initiative encouraging Israelis and Palestinians to find common ground through art and music.

His track "Big Ben" was included on Celebrate Hip Hop: Jewish Artists from Around the World, a 2005 compilation also featuring cuts from RZA and Blood of Abraham. "Big Ben" eulogizes a close friend and music partner who was killed in the 2002 bombing of the Hebrew University cafeteria in Jerusalem.

In 2007, Subliminal released a Holocaust memorial song and video, "Adon Olam, Ad Matai" ("God Almighty, Until When?"). In response, Sagol recorded "Shoah Business", calling Subliminal out for what Sagol perceived as lyrics exploiting the Holocaust.

In 2011, along with seven other Israeli MCs of varying ancestry, Sagol recorded "List of Demands", in support of demonstrations taking place in Israel calling for equal rights among citizens. The following year, the song was included on the mixtape Internationally Known Vol. 2.

In September 2014, Sagol appeared as a featured guest artist at the MasterPeace concert held at Amsterdam's Ziggo Dome, along with Palestinian rapper Saz. Sagol and Saz performed the newly recorded song "From The Beginning" at the concert.

=== Documentary appearances ===
Sagol was interviewed for the 2005 documentary I Know I'm Not Alone, directed by Michael Franti of Spearhead. The film, which premiered at the Slamdance Film Festival, is about music in Middle Eastern occupied territories. Sagol also appears in Joshua Atesh Litle's 2010 documentary The Furious Force of Rhymes, about the effect of hip hop worldwide, featuring his 2008 song "Jerusalem." In 2026, Sagol was featured in the documentary series "Black Gold - The Story of Israeli Hip Hop", produced by Kan 11, the national channel operated by the Israeli Public Broadcasting Corporation (IPBC).

== Artistic style and acclaim ==
Jewlicious says Sagol's "raps are earthy, poetic, rough and real." MTV Iggy says he has "gained a legendary reputation in and out of his country" and "his raps are hot." In a KlezmerShack.com review of the compilation Celebrate Hip Hop, on which Sagol appears, Sagol's exploration of social corruption and religious conflict is singled out as being "especially revealing." In a lengthy feature about his 2017 U.S. tour, Tablet magazine called Sagol "One of Israel’s pioneering hip-hop artists".

== Discography ==
=== Albums ===
- The Blue Period (2000, Fact Records)
- Where Did We Go Wrong (2002, Fact Records)
- The Two Sides of Purple 59 (2003, NMC Records)
- Hip Hop Einstein (2006, NMC Records)
- Make Room (2008, JDub Records)
- Remixed 2000-2010 (2010, JDub Records)
- Another Passenger (2011, Lev Group Media / 8th Note Records)
- The Promised Land: The Grateful Dead / Jerry Garcia Hebrew Project - with Ami Yares (2015)
- Ploughing In The Mud (2018, B.M.usic) - With Lukach (As The Work Managers)
- Pirkei Avot (Veteran Joints) (2019, Kame'a Records)
- The Father, The Son and The Mayor (2021, Kame'a Records)
- Millennial Dinosaur (2023, Kame'a Records)
- Lost Bars (2025, Kame'a Records)

=== Mixtapes ===
- Leave Something For The Guests (2015, Self-release)

=== EPs ===
- "Reason to Die" (2003, 9 Records)- With Israeli punk-rock band Breast Cancer
- "Family Business" (2015, Kame'a) - With Shiroto
- "thREeMIXes" (2019, Kame'a)
- "thREeMIXes II" (2019, Kame'a)
- "Dinosaur Remixed" (2024, Kame'a)
- "Bars Only" (2025, Kame'a)
- "59420" (2025, Kame'a)

=== Compilations ===
- A Stranger Song: A Hebrew Tribute to Leonard Cohen (2004, Blind Janitor) – "Chelsea Hotel No. 2"
- Celebrate Hip Hop: Jewish Artists from Around the World (2006, Craig N Co) – "Big Ben"
- Rooftop Roots III (2007, JDub Records) – "Lech Kadima" feat. Roy
- Rooftop Roots IV (2008, JDub Records) – "Jerusalem" feat. Sha’anan Streett and Rebel Sun
- JDub Presents Jewltide (2008, JDub Records) – "Leeches (DJ Spooky Remix)" and "Till the Fat Lady Dances" feat. Noa Faran
- Internationally Known Vol. 2 (2012, Nomadic Wax) – "List of Demands"
- Jenerous Skillz (2012, Uneek Media / Corner Prophets) - "The Tunez" feat. Controverse, Lefty, Shiroto, Stepper & Benyomen; "Work With DAT" feat. Stepper, Lefty & De Cipher; "J-Funk" feat. Controverse, Benyomen, MC Theory, Mic G & Big J; "Strike Down Upon Thee" feat. OBD, Controverse & MC Theory
- "Yismach Chataneinu" - A Tribute To Daklon (2023, Israel Today) - "Ayelet Hen"

=== Guest appearances ===
- "Fight Rebel Sun" - Coolooloosh feat. Sagol 59, Quami, Sha'anan Streett, Kaolina and Kashi – from Coolooloosh (2007, Coolooloosh)
- "Microphone Patuach" – Peled & Ortega feat. Extra G, Ori Shochat and Sagol 59 – from Special Delivery (2010, High Fiber Productions)
- "Lo Bai'm Betov" – Produx feat. Sagol 59 – from Resurrection of the Dead (2010, Madman)
- "Intro" and "My Hood" – Nouveau Depart feat. Sagol 59 – from Nouveau Depart (2013, Baruch & Jo)
- "Hogeg Ta'ahava" (Celebrate The Love) - Table Knights ft. Sagol 59 - From "Sounds Of Victory II" (2018, Shigola Records)
- "Hu Alla" (Remix) - Yossi Fine & Ben Aylon ft. Sagol 59 (2018, Independent)
- "Namuch" (Low) - With Shiroto and Shaanan Streett of Hadag Nahash (2020, Kame'a Music)
- "Malachim" (Angels) - Mayor ft. Sagol 59 (2020, Kame'a Music)
- "Zman Bidood" (Quarantine Time) - Segev ft. Sagol 59 (2021, iVibez)
- "Merubaim Beveit Hakvarot" (Squares in the Cemetery) – “V.A - Songs of Hanoch Levin” (2022, Nana Disc)
- “Menavet” (Navigating) – Adash Badash ft. Sagol 59, Shaanan Street, Avri G, Nevo Shirazi, FlowerBen – “Adashizm” (2022, Pele Rekordz)
- “Mevakesh Slicha” (Asking for Forgiveness) – Rubin ft. Sagol 59 – “Rubin E.P” (2023, Independent Release)
- "Tse Lee MeHaframe” (Get out of my Frame) – David Dassa ft. Sagol 59, Nevo Shirazi, Nati Hassid – “Opening My Heart” (2023, Independent Release)
- “Sensei” – Ido Minkovski ft. Sagol 59 – “Starting With A Comeback” (2023, Mobile1 Music)
- “MC Midor Rishon” (1st-gen MC) – Ninja420 ft. Sagol 59 – “21G” (2023, Independent Release)
- “Ma Aase Ksheyigamru Li Hamilim (What Shall I Do When I Run Out of Words)”– Ninja420 ft. Sagol 59, Roison – “21G” (2023, Independent Release)
- “Haya Li Tov" (I Had It Good)”– Ido Maimon ft. Sagol 59 (2024, Helicon Music)
- “Medina Acheret" (A Different Country)”– Ido Maimon ft. Sagol 59 & Noa (2024, Helicon Music)
- “Ha Parlament" (The Parliament)”– Kobi Oz, Shaanan Streett, Sagol 59, Miro, Nimi Nim, Chulu & Kashi (2024, Helicon Music/Jigga Juice)
- “Liberate Your Mind“ - Big-J ft. Sagol 59 (2025, Pele Records)
- “Medium Roast“ - Controverse ft. Big-J & Sagol 59 (2025, Self Released)
- "D.I.Y" - Groove Salad ft. Sagol 59 (2025, Mobile 1 Music)
- "Mochrotime" (The Day After Tomorrow) - Zeev Tene ft. Sagol 59 (Digistage)

== Film appearances ==
- Blue White Collar Criminal (2004, dir. Noam Kaplan)
- I Know I'm Not Alone (2005, dir. Michael Franti)
- Fact by Fact (2009, dir. Ran Eisenstadt)
- Holy Land Hardball (2010, dir. Brett Rapkin and Eric Kesten) – music only
- The Furious Force of Rhymes (2010, dir. Joshua Atesh Litle)
- Be A Nelson - Music Above Fighting (2015, dir. Remko Geursen)
- Black Gold: The Story of Israeli Hip Hop (2026, dir. Omri Dekel Kadosh, Rom Atik)
