= Shake the Missile Base =

Studio album by Steve Lieberman the Gangsta Rabbi
- Released: 27 November 2007
- Recorded: March 2007 – October 2007
- Genre: Punk rock, Jewish, Obscuro, Experimental, Progressive Rock, PitBash
- Length: 65:13
- Label: Bad'lan USA
- Producer: Steve Lieberman

Steve Lieberman the Gangsta Rabbi chronology
Last Of The Jewish Pirates (2007)	Shake the Missile Base (2007)	Psych Ward (2008)

Shake the Missile Base is a punk, experimental noise rock album and the 13th album released by New York punk/experimental bassist/flutist Steve Lieberman (The Gangsta Rabbi)age 49 at the time of release, 27 November 2007, six weeks before Lieberman was committed to a local psych ward for cutting and other complications of major depressive and bipolar disorders. His failing mental health is evidenced repetitively on the album, especially in the songs "Public Suicide", "The Flagellator" and "Ld50'.

During a tour for Shake the Missile Base in the spring of 2008, Lieberman cut himself on stage during the performance of "Public Suicide" in at New York's Crazy Donkey club.

"Public Suicide" and "Sex Whore" reached the top ten on SoundClick's rock chart in 2008.

== Track listing ==
All tracks are written by Steve Lieberman except where noted.

No.	Title	Length
1.	"Public Suicide"	2:18
2.	"Editor's Pick"	3:10
3.	"Sex Whore"	1:47
4.	"Bullycide (Requirem for Jared)"	3:38
5.	"Skinheads in my Yard Oy Vey! '458"	2:47
6.	"A Girl For Everyone But Me"	2:43
7.	"Radio Nowhere" (Springsteen)	3:41
8.	"I Masturbate"	2:09
9.	"Commando Commando"	1:59
10.	"Joe Wants It Yesterday"	2:42
11.	"The Flagellator"	2:42
12.	"Gimme Desert Fever"	3:55
13.	"Shake the Missile Base"	3:32
14.	"Rubbin' One Out For my Baby"	3:18
15.	"The Bad Touch" (The Bloodhound Gang)	3:15
16.	"Love @Defcon-5"	3:09
17.	"Apeman" (Davies)	3:27
18.	"Love > Genre"	3:16
19.	"Wish You Were Here" (Gilmour, Waters)	3:48
20.	"Lovesick Again"	2:45
21.	"Left Me Suicidal"	2:59
22.	"ld50/Private Suicide"	3:06

== Personnel ==
- Steve Lieberman – bass guitars, vocals, flutes, recorders, Laotian Concorbit flute, shahnai, renaissance flute, zaphon trombone, melodica, beatmachines

== Videos ==
- "Public Suicide" (2007) on YouTube
- "Wish You Were Here" (2007) on YouTube
