= Adamsdown Primary School =

School in Cardiff, UK

Coordinates: 51.483765°N 3.159530°W

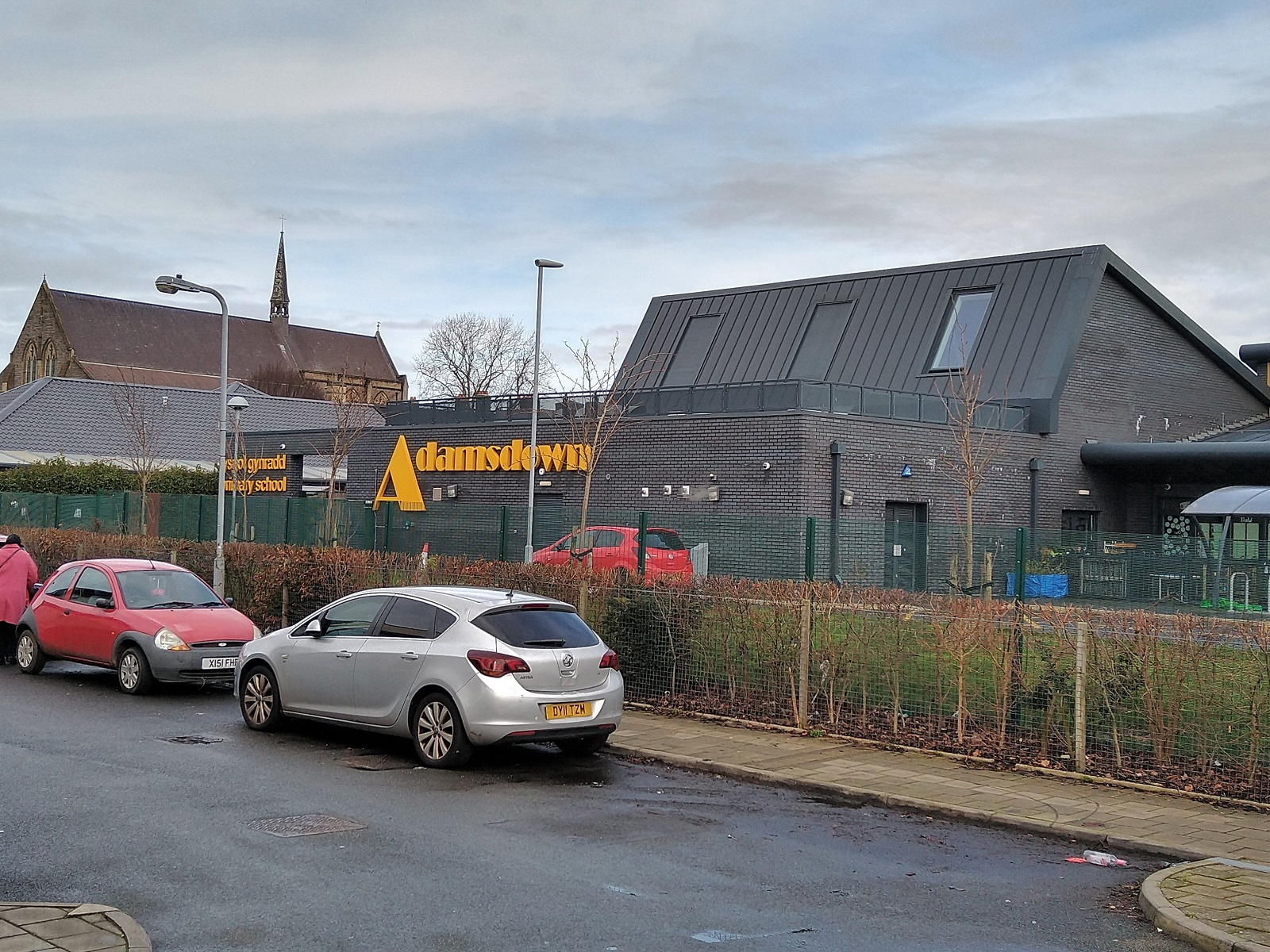
Adamsdown Primary School

Adamsdown Primary School is a school in Adamsdown, Cardiff serving children from the ages of 3 to 11, founded in 1875. Its motto is: Caring Sharing Learning Together.

In 2009, pupils from Adamsdown Primary School recorded a song, Adamsdown Song, with local songwriter Jon Blake. The track topped the Soundclick.com charts in May 2009.

In 2016 the school was assessed as needing improvements.

In 2018 the school doubled in size, with a new extension opened by Welsh Government Education Secretary, Kirsty Williams, in June 2018.
