= Patrick Beaulier =

Patrick Aleph
- Born: Patrick Beaulier
- Genres: Punk rock, garage rock
- Occupations: Singer, songwriter, writer, rabbi
- Years active: 2006–present
- Formerly of: The Love Drunks, Can Can, Ice Bats
- Website: rabbipatrick.com

Patrick Beaulier, known formerly by his professional name as Patrick Aleph, is an American writer, blogger, podcaster, non-denominational rabbi and spiritual leader, educator, and retired punk musician. He has been the lead vocalist for the bands The Love Drunks, Can Can, and Ice Bats. He is also the co-founder and creative director of PunkTorah, a non-profit website and Jewish outreach organization, and its subsidiaries OneShul.org and Darshan Yeshiva, an online synagogue and yeshiva, respectively. He has written for Jewcy, The Atlanta Jewish Times, and The Times of Israel, and hosts the semi-weekly Rabbi Patrick Podcast.

== Early life ==
Beaulier grew up in Atlanta. His parents came from a Christian background but raised him without religion. Despite this, he became interested in faith on his own and converted to Judaism through the Reconstructionist movement in his early 20s. He later said that his "decision to become a Jew was about ethical monotheism. God demands of us a righteous life."

== Music career ==
One of Beaulier's first bands was The Love Drunks, which released their self-titled debut album through Alive Records in 2006.

In 2007, Beaulier formed the punk band Can Can with guitarist Mary Collins and drummer Josh Lamar, whom he met through the local music scene. As the band's songwriter, Beaulier incorporated subtle lyrical references to his Jewish faith. The band released two albums, All Hell (2009) and their JDub Records debut Monsters & Healers (2010), before going on hiatus in 2011. Can Can was featured in the film 1/20.

During the hiatus, Beaulier and Collins formed a no wave side project called Ice Bats.

== PunkTorah and rabbinical work ==
In April 2009, after an unpleasant experience at a synagogue in Atlanta, Beaulier began recording his own divrei Torah on the weekly parsha and posting them on YouTube under the name PunkTorah, referring to his background as a punk singer. Following the popularity of the videos, he co-founded PunkTorah with Michael Sabani as a 501(c)(3) non-profit, under which he created PunkTorah.org, a combination blog, multimedia network, and online community aimed at disaffected Jews. Beaulier was also featured in a parshah video by Bimbam (formerly G-dcast.com)

Beaulier and Sabani started a fundraising campaign in August 2010 to create OneShul.org, an expansion of the online distance minyanim they had been hosting via PunkTorah. That same year, they founded another PunkTorah subsidiary, NewKosher, through which they published Birkat Hamazon, a bentcher incorporating recipes, essays, and poetry from Jewish writers like Matthue Roth, Leon Adato, and Michael Croland.

Beaulier is the founder and rosh yeshiva of Darshan Yeshiva, a virtual school training students for Jewish spiritual leadership. The yeshiva currently includes an online Jewish conversion course.

After serving a Jewish congregation based in Midlothian, Virginia, Beaulier founded Kehillah, a Jewish congregation in Richmond, Virginia which hosts events throughout the area's city and suburbs.

In January 2019, Beaulier became the director of innovation for Pluralistic Rabbinical Seminary, an online rabbinical school. The school includes Conservative and Reform rabbis educating and ordaining post-denominational rabbinical students.

== Bibliography ==
- Birkat HaMazon: A Community Bencher (2010) (with Michael Sabani)
- NewKosher Jewish Vegan Cookbook (2011)
- Ahava Rabbah: The OneShul Community Siddur (2011)
- PunkTorah: The First Anthology (2012)
- Choosing To Be Chosen: Essays By Converts to Judaism (2012)

== Discography ==
=== With The Love Drunks ===
- The Love Drunks (Alive, 2006)

=== With Can Can ===
- All Hell (Self-released, 2009)
- Monsters & Healers (JDub, 2010)
