= Jewlicious =

Blog and non-profit organization

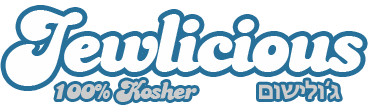
- Formation: 2004; 22 years ago
- Founders: David Abitbol; Laya Millman
- Subsidiaries: Jewlicious U. Camp Jewlicious; TikkunFest; JewnFest; Shabbat Tent
- Affiliations: Non-denominational Judaism
- Website: jewlicious.com

Jewlicious is a blog and nonprofit organization, focused on presenting Judaism, Jewish culture, and Israeli politics for a contemporary American audience. The blog was founded in 2004 by David Abitbol and Laya Millman and has featured posts from a variety of contributors. Jewlicious has since expanded, organizing a variety of projects and events, most notably the Jewlicious Festival, a bi-annual cultural and music festival.

== History ==
Jewlicious was founded in 2004 by David Abitbol, a web designer who moved to Jerusalem from Park Slope, Brooklyn, and Laya Millman, an American who had immigrated to Israel. Abitbol had previously done web design and publicity for clients including American Apparel, the Shalem Center, and StandWithUs, and during the site's early existence, he moved from Old Montreal, Canada to a Jerusalem apartment near Mahane Yehuda Market. Abitbol had felt conflicted by the contemporary "Cool Jew" media trend, exemplified by Heeb magazine and JDub Records, as he felt it was too dismissive of traditional Judaism and unduly critical of Israel. Following the release of Mel Gibson's controversial film The Passion of the Christ, which many saw as promoting Jewish deicide, Abitbol and some friends launched a website, christkiller.net, where they sold t-shirts with the logo "Christ Killer" and posted photo essays of people wearing the shirts. Abitbol would later adopt the online pseudonym "CK" in reference to this project. Encouraged, Abitbol launched the Jewlicious blog in July 2004.

Despite an irreverent aesthetic, the Jewlicious blog often covers serious topics related to Jewish culture and tradition, the Holocaust, and Israeli politics. The blog has over a dozen regular contributors based in Europe, Israel, and the United States. At its peak, the blog averaged 8,000 to 10,000 hits a day; Abitbol speculated in May 2006 that Jewlicious was the most globally popular blog on Jewish and Israeli topics, not counting Little Green Footballs. The site saw a particular spike in traffic from Lebanon during the 2006 Lebanon War. In August 2008, Abitbol was a panelist at the inaugural JBlogging Conference in Jerusalem. In 2026, Abitbol received the David Twersky Journalism Award, presented by the American Jewish Press Association, for his Jewlicious piece "Is Israel Losing America? Thanks Bibi," a long-form analysis of how Prime Minister Netanyahu's political choices had eroded bipartisan American support for Israel. The award, named for journalist and Forward deputy editor David Twersky (1950–2010), was selected unanimously by a panel of judges including JJ Goldberg, former editor of the Forward, and members of the Twersky family. Past recipients include Jane Eisner, Andrew Silow-Carroll, Larry Cohler-Esses, and Adam Langer.

Expanding in popularity, Abitbol and Jewlicious quickly began to expand to other projects. Jewlicious ran an internet radio station, which played artists like Israeli rapper Subliminal, and an online store at shmatas.com, which sold shirts with slogans like "I love Hashem" and "Challah hu Akbar". They partnered with Birthright Israel to organize Birthright trips for Jewlicious readers, which were documented on the blog. Abitbol and Millman organized the biannual Florida-based conference series "Jewlicious on the Beach", one of which featured a performance by Matisyahu and a lecture by Eytan Schwartz. They have co-sponsored parties in Jerusalem, at New York's Sephardic Music Festival, and at a Tu B'Av event in Los Angeles. According to Abitbol, Jewlicious has been approached by Aish HaTorah, Nefesh B'Nefesh, and the New Israel Fund for partnerships.

In 2010, Jewlicious was one of several Jewish websites to promote the Jewish Federations of North America's "What's your #ish?" campaign, alongside Heeb magazine, Jewcy, and JDate. The previous year, Rabbi Bookstein had been a finalist in the Jewish Federations of North America's inaugural Jewish Community Hero Award. He received 91,450 votes, nearly double the total of the second-place finisher and more than ten times that of the 20th-place finisher, though the final winner was selected by a panel of judges rather than by popular vote. That same year, Rabbi Bookstein was named to The Forward's annual Forward 50 list of influential American Jews.

=== Jewlicious Festival ===
Jewlicious has run the biannual Jewlicious Festival since 2005. The festival was co-founded by Abitbol, HuffPost blogger Rabbi Yonah Bookstein (who also serves as festival director), and Bookstein's wife, Rachel Bookstein. The inaugural festival was a shabbaton held at Alpert Jewish Community Center in Long Beach, California, a partnership with the local Hillel House, and featured Eytan Schwartz, rock band the Makkkabees, and rap group Hip Hop Hoodíos. Later festivals have featured drum circles, concerts, discussion groups, comedians, environmental activism, and presentations on various topics, with guest including Matisyahu, indie rock group Fool's Gold, comedian and author Joel Chasnoff, Israeli boxer Yuri Foreman, and Noah Alper of Noah's Bagels. There are two annual Jewlicious Festivals, a winter one in Long Beach and a summer one in Simi Valley, California. Rabbi Yonah Bookstein has described the festival as having elements of Jewish summer camps, TED conferences, and music festivals.

The eighth annual Jewlicious Festival in 2012 was held aboard the RMS Queen Mary in Long Beach. The event included meditation and Jewish yoga, talks on philosophy, politics, and the Occupy movement, and various Shabbat services, and guests included comedians Todd Barry and Moshe Kasher, actress Mayim Bialik, and musical groups The Aggrolites, and Moshav.

The 2010 Jewlicious Festival was notably picketed by members of the Westboro Baptist Church. The year before, Megan Phelps-Roper, granddaughter of church founder Fred Phelps, had found Abitbol's name in a Jewish Telegraphic Agency article and messaged him on Twitter telling him to "repent". This led to a dialogue between the two, which played a role in Phelps-Roper ultimately breaking away from Westboro Baptist and becoming a vocal critic of the church. In 2013, Abitbol invited Phelps-Roper and her younger sister Grace to speak at that year's Jewlicious Festival about their ideological journey. In 2017, Megan gave a lecture in Tel Aviv and Jerusalem, entitled "Overcoming Hatred", which was co-sponsored by Jewlicious and The Times of Israel.

== Criticism and controversy ==
In early 2011, Jewish singer-songwriter Naomi Less posted on her blog Jewish Chicks Rock accusing the Jewlicious Festival of being an Orthodox gathering masquerading as a pluralistic event, citing the lack of female headliners scheduled for that year's festival and its correspondence with kol isha. She later made similar accusations on the eJewish Philanthropy blog. Abitbol responded in the comments sections of both posts, listing several female and non-Orthodox artists that had performed at the festival in the past and denying that kol isha was a factor in the selection process. He later summarized the debate on the Jewlicious blog, noting that "Naomi Less is a wonderful musician and performer".

As part of a 2012 fundraiser, Jewlicious.com offered several prizes to donors, among them a personal dinner date with Jewlicious bloggers Jessica Snapper and Michelle Esther Appelbaum, who would be flown out to meet the winner. Several Twitter users, including journalist Allison Good, accused the prize of having sexist undertones, with Good directly tweeting Abitbol that he was "actually pimping out [his] bloggers." In response to the controversy, Abitbol argued that both women were actively involved in coming up with the campaign. Appelbaum told Haaretz that the prize would be "more of a joke than anything else. If someone were to donate this amount for a "date," there would certainly be a background check, and never would I go to a private place with any stranger." She further argued that "what is really gross and offensive is the implication that Jessica and I are likened prostitutes hired by a character in Mad Men to help seal a deal...This is despite the fact that the photos used were not at all provocative and both of us are college educated women possessed of, or seeking advanced degrees."
