= Can Can (band) =

American punk rock band

- Origin: Atlanta, Georgia
- Genres: Punk rock, art punk, grunge, garage rock
- Years active: 2007–2011 (hiatus)
- Label: JDub
- Members: Patrick Aleph(stage name); Mary Collins; Josh Lamar

Can Can (stylized as Can!!Can) is an American punk rock band from Atlanta, Georgia. They were formed in 2007 by lead vocalist Patrick Aleph, guitarist Mary Collins, and drummer Josh Lamar. They released their independent debut album, All Hell, before signing to JDub Records, who released their next album, Monsters & Healers, the following year. They are known for Aleph's aggressive vocals and philosophical, Jewish-themed lyrics.

== Biography ==
Can Can was formed in 2007 in Atlanta, Georgia. Its members met through the local music scene: Lead singer Patrick Beaulier who performed as Patrick Aleph was in the Alive Records band The Love Drunks, guitarist Mary Collins performed as Trixie Riptide with the riot grrrl band The Moto-Litas, and drummer Josh Lamar toured with Nick Oliveri's band Mondo Generator.

In January 2008, the band released the EP Holy Kiss. Later in the year, they performed at The EARL with Thee Crucial and participated in a Chabad fundraiser in response to the then-recent Mumbai attacks. On January 27, 2009, the band released their debut album, All Hell.

The band subsequently signed with JDub Records and released a second album, Monsters & Healers, on July 7, 2010.

In March 2011, Josh Lamar announced via Facebook that they would be going on indefinite hiatus, with the possibility of one more show. Over a decade later, Mary Collins formed the project Oncilla with Lamar as drummer and producer.

== Musical style ==
Shortly before the release of All Hell, Saul Austerlitz of The Forward the band's songs "weld punk attitude to heavy metal's metaphorically dense, lyrically pungent aura." A concert review from Paste Magazine described the "careening punk emanating from their one drum kit, one guitar and screaming vocals [that] sounds like it was produced by an army silhouetted against the light." Another Forward writer, Mordechai Shinefield, saw the band as influenced by "denizens of a post-Sonic Youth world where the Yeah Yeah Yeahs were once the biggest act ever." The Pittsburgh Jewish Chronicle associate editor Justin Jacobs praised Monsters & Healers for "pairing Mary Collins' jagged guitars and Josh Lamar's tight, controlled percussion with Aleph's ragged howls and chants."

Much of the band's identity comes from the persona of lead singer Patrick Aleph. Matthue Roth described his vocals as "snide and sincere, like a postmodern Dean Martin," while Shinefield notes his use of "Andy Falkousesque howls". Additionally, Aleph, an outspoken Torah-observant Jew, will often incorporate subtle Jewish themes in his lyrics, such as references to the Two Tablets and the Promised Land. Aleph has said, "If I can give young Jews a sense of spiritual connection through heavy music in the same way that my Christian colleagues have done so, then that's a wonderful thing, but that's not necessarily what I'm trying to do...If they go the extra step and read the lyrics and see that there are songs about creation mythology, and a song about olam haba, well, what is that? Then that's great."

== Members ==
- Patrick Beaulier (performing as Patrick Aleph) – lead vocals
- Mary Collins – guitar
- Josh Lamar – drums

== Discography ==
=== Albums ===
- All Hell (2009)
- Monsters & Healers (2010)

=== EPs ===
- Holy Kiss EP (2008)
