= The Promised Land (Sagol 59 album) =

The Promised Land: The Grateful Dead / Jerry Garcia Hebrew Project

Studio album by Sagol 59 and Ami Yares
- Released: April 17, 2015
- Genre: Folk
- Length: 63:57

Sagol 59 and Ami Yares chronology
Leave Something for the Guests (2015)	The Promised Land: The Grateful Dead / Jerry Garcia Hebrew Project (2015)	Esek Mishpachti (2015)

The Promised Land: The Grateful Dead / Jerry Garcia Hebrew Project is a 2015 album by Sagol 59 and Ami Yares, featuring Hebrew language covers of songs by the Grateful Dead and Jerry Garcia. It was released on April 17, 2015. The album was followed, in August 2015, by The Promised Land Acoustic Sessions EP, which contained four additional recordings: Hebrew renditions of "Ripple", "Brown Eyed Women", "Friend of the Devil" and "Ship of Fools". "The Pita Tapes" followed in March 2016, containing two unreleased demo recordings of songs often covered by the Grateful Dead and Garcia (Merle Haggard's "Mama Tried" and Johnny Russell's "Catfish John"). A nine-track limited edition vinyl LP was released in April 2016. On August 1, 2016, studio recordings of "Deep Elem Blues" and "Half-Step Mississippi Uptown Toodeloo" were released digitally, to coincide with Garcia's birthday. A live show recording was released digitally in April 2017 as The Promised Land at The Deanery, Brooklyn NY 3-23-2017. Live in Cafe Bialik, Tel Aviv, a soundboard concert recording, was released July 4, 2017. Another recording of a Tel Aviv show, Acoustic Live at the Tsuzamen, Tel Aviv, Aug 10th 2017, was released in October 2017. Another live set, Live by the Dead Sea, was released in November 2017. A Hebrew rendition of the song "It Must Have Been the Roses" was released in December 2017. A live soundboard recording, The Jaffa Rooftop Concert, was released as a digital download in May 2018. Studio recordings of "Monkey & the Engineer" and "Dire Wolf" were released on April 1, 2021.

== Production ==
In 2013, Khen Rotem, who records as Israeli hip hop artist Sagol 59, decided to adapt Robert Hunter's Grateful Dead lyrics into Hebrew for a full-length album. He mentioned the idea to the folk singer Ami Yares, a New Jersey native and longtime Israeli resident, who was immediately on board. Rotem spent approximately 18 months translating the lyrics from English into Hebrew. He had previously translated songs by Leonard Cohen, Tom Waits, Frank Zappa and Grandmaster Flash into Hebrew. The resulting album, The Promised Land, a collaboration between Sagol 59 and Yares, was the first album featuring Hebrew versions of Grateful Dead songs. With his translations, Rotem said he attempted to keep the phonetics of the lyrics intact as much as possible, choosing the band's more approachable songs. Rotem did take some liberties in his translations, such as changing the names of US cities and neighborhoods to Israeli ones, and changing the meaning of certain words to fit the correct number of syllables. The musical compositions remain true to the original versions.

The album was recorded in Israel and the United States. The project was officially authorized by The Grateful Dead's publishing company.

== Reception ==
The Jerusalem Post wrote that Rotem and Yares "succeed in capturing the warm, folksy side of the band with a sound that wouldn’t sound out of place around a kibbutz bonfire." Jweekly said the album "makes for a very interesting listening experience." Jewschool called it "a fascinating, faithful, and very enjoyable love letter," while Relix.com wrote "the duo's debut is both nostalgic and visionary." In December 2015, Sagol and Yares embarked on a U.S. tour of the project, which included shows in Minneapolis-St. Paul, Atlanta, Baltimore, Philadelphia, New Jersey and New York. In March 2017, Sagol embarked on a U.S. tour, which included performances at the Atlanta Jewish Music Festival, New York City's Pinks, The Deanery in Brooklyn and Garcia's at The Capitol Theatre (Port Chester, New York). In an article about the tour, Tablet magazine stated, "The Promised Land promises something totally new: The Dead as you’ve never heard them before, and may never hear them again". In June 2018, Sagol performed an acoustic set of Promised Land songs at the Article 24 club in Boston, MA. In March 2020, Sagol went on another Promised Land U.S. tour, which saw him and several American musicians perform two shows in Washington D.C, a show in Flemington, NJ and a show at the Nublu club in NYC's East Village. In June 2024, Sagol performed a Promised Land set as the headliner of the Boulder Jewish Music Festival in Boulder, Colorado.

== Track listing ==
No.	Title	Length
1.	"Intro – Dark Moon"	1:06
2.	"Bertha"	5:11
3.	"Sugaree"	5:05
4.	"Me & My Uncle"	3:02
5.	"Loser"	5:55
6.	"Friend Of The Devil"	4:26
7.	"New Minglewood Blues"	3:11
8.	"Cold Rain & Snow"	3:49
9.	"I Know You Rider"	4:19
10.	"Mission In The Rain"	4:56
11.	"Deal"	3:51
12.	"Black Muddy River"	5:01
13.	"Outro – Bright Star"	1:14
14.	"New Speedway Boogie" (home demo)	5:13
15.	"Tennessee Jed" (home demo)	3:52
16.	"Brokedown Palace" (home demo)	3:45

== Personnel ==
- Sagol 59 – Vocals, electric guitar, song translations, executive producer
- Ami Yares – Electric and acoustic guitars, oud, ukulele, banjo, mandolin, backing vocals, producer
- Naaman Shadmi – Keyboards
- Avsha Elan – Bass
- Gon Amir – Drums, percussion
- Jason Reich – Mandolin on "Friend of the Devil"
