= Jewcy =

Online magazine

- Website type: Online magazine
- Available in: English
- Owner: Nextbook Inc. (subsidiary: Jewcy Media LLC)
- Website: jewcy.com
- Launched: November 15, 2006
- Current status: Dormant (last updated March 2022)

Jewcy is an online magazine of Jewish pop culture and offbeat news that was most active between 2006 and 2018. The site was launched on November 15, 2006, by co-founding editors Joey Kurtzman and Tahl Raz, a journalist and co-author of the bestselling business book Never Eat Alone. The Guardian has described the movement that Jewcy represents as "at the forefront of a reinvention of Jewish identity by young US Jews". The New York Times has described the cultural milieu from which Jewcy emerged as part of "the Jewish Hipster movement".

== History ==
In May 2008, Jewcy announced a content partnership with Zeek, an independent Jewish journal of thought and culture, with Zeek publishing its online content through Jewcy.com. Tahl Raz described the partnership as "the first of many" in an effort to assemble "an all-star team of the nation's most original, creative voices." In October 2009, the not-for-profit JDub Records, led by co-founder Aaron Bisman, announced that it had adopted Jewcy, making it a new project of the seven-year-old organization. By 2009, Jewcy claimed over 100,000 unique monthly visitors and more than 1,000 registered bloggers. Lilit Marcus served as editor-in-chief until February 2010, when Jason Diamond, a writer and author of the memoir Searching for John Hughes, took over the position. . Gabriela Geselowitz later served as editor, taking the role in March 2016. In 2011, Tablet Magazine acquired Jewcy, operating it as an affiliated publication under their shared parent company Nextbook Inc., a nonprofit arts and cultural organization. Jewcy went on hiatus in 2018, and briefly reactivated in August 2021 under editor Isaac de Castro, publishing its last article in March 2022 before going dormant again.

== See also ==
- Heeb
- Tablet Magazine
- JDub Records
- Jewish hipsters
- Jewlicious
