= KZSU =

Radio station at Stanford University

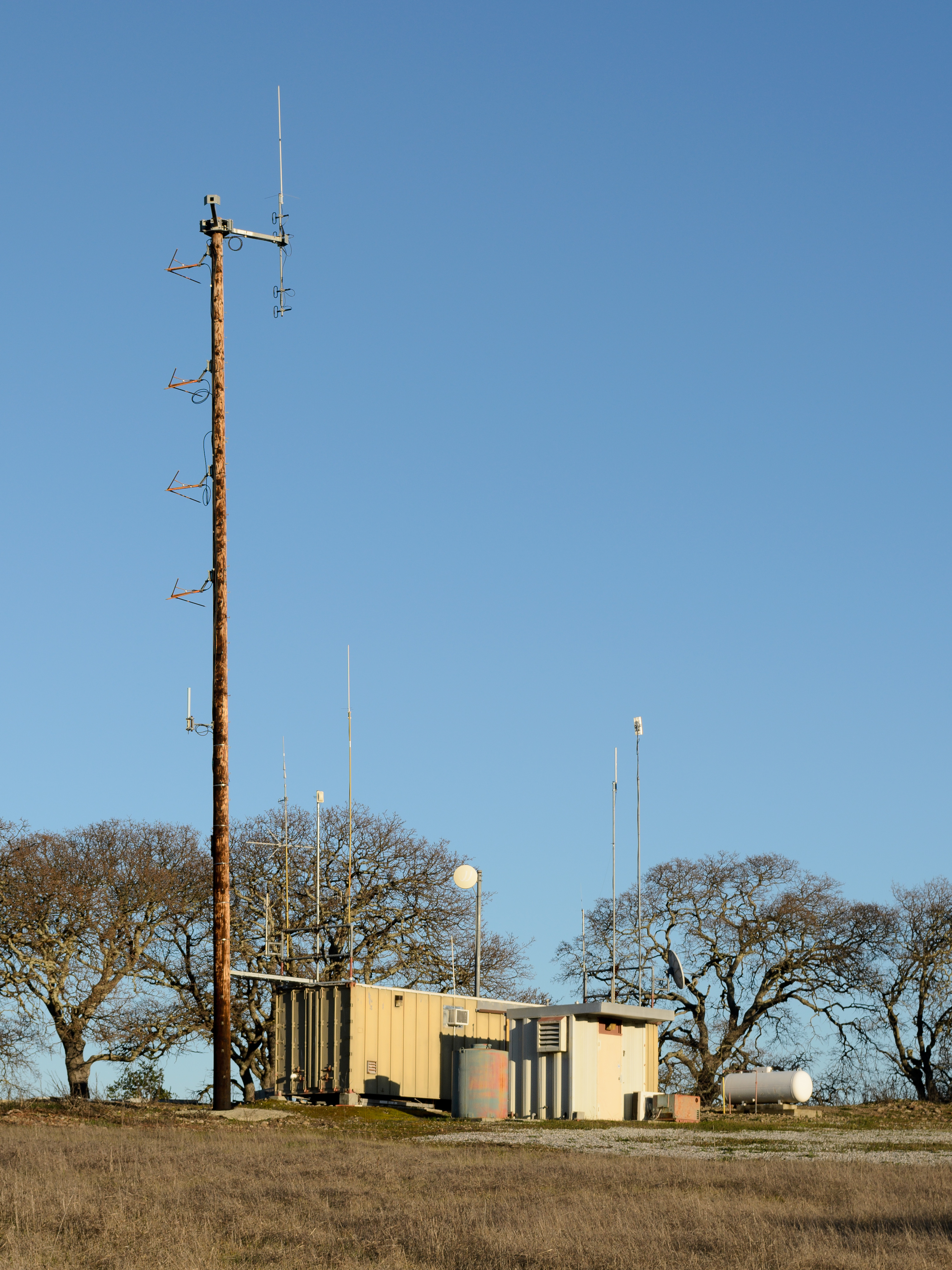
- KZSU's transmitter in the Dish area
- Stanford, California; United States
- Broadcast area: San Francisco Peninsula
- Frequency: 90.1 MHz
- Branding: Stanford Radio

Programming
- Format: Variety

Ownership
- Owner: Stanford University

History
- Call sign meaning: Stanford University

Technical information
- Licensing authority: FCC
- Facility ID: 65452
- Class: A
- ERP: 500 watts
- HAAT: −3 meters (−9.8 ft)
- Transmitter coordinates: 37°24′42.00″N 122°10′41.00″W

Links
- Public license information: Public file; LMS
- Webcast: Listen live
- Website: kzsu.stanford.edu

KZSU (90.1 FM) is a freeform radio station broadcasting from the campus of Stanford University in Stanford, California, United States.

KZSU station is owned by the trustees of Stanford University and is governed by a board of directors appointed by the university's president. Operations are managed by a general manager selected each year from the student body.

== Broadcasting history ==
KZSU began broadcasting on January 6, 1947, using the informal call letters KSU. Originally an AM carrier-current station, it relied on cables strung throughout Stanford's network of steam tunnels to carry its 590 kHz (later 880 kHz) signal. The first broadcast was a musical comedy revue starring Doodles Weaver. At first, the station broadcast only in the evenings. In the 1940s and 1950s, KZSU was a commercial station broadcasting popular and classical music, local cultural events, talk shows, and radio plays.

The station was shut down for two years following a raid by the Federal Communications Commission (FCC) in August 1958, which resulted from rising interference with the signal of radio station KGO-AM at 810 kHz. Broadcasting resumed in the fall of 1960. Renamed KZSU at the behest of the FCC, the station received a noncommercial FM license in 1964, moved its transmitter from the center of campus to the nearby foothills in 1970, and upgraded its transmitter power from 10 to 500 watts in 1978. The AM carrier gradually died in the early 1980s.

KZSU's all-volunteer staff is currently made up of community members, as well as Stanford students and staff.

While the height above average terrain (HAAT) of its 500-watt transmitting antenna is minus 3 meters (-10 feet), owing to proximity to mountains, its height above mean sea level (AMSL) is 155 m (509 ft.), giving it a vantage over the flat regions visible from the transmitter site. These include all of Stanford and Palo Alto, and much of the Peninsula and South Bay. According to the university, the station's signal extends as far north as the San Francisco International Airport and south as San Jose.

KZSU has also broadcast live on the internet since 1995.

== Programming ==
KZSU's programming includes the following:

- The "Stanford Sadie" show, which ran from 1947 to 1961, was a notoriously racy satirical program based loosely on the Tokyo Rose and Axis Sally broadcasts of World War II. Sadie, whose mission was to distract male students from studying, was portrayed by approximately two dozen women over the years.
- KZSU broadcast tapes of live shows recorded at a nearby coffeehouse called Top of the Tangent in the early 1960s. One of the bands caught on tape was Mother McCree's Uptown Jug Champions, which later became the Grateful Dead. The recording, unearthed in 1997, has since been released on CD.
- "Mystery Playhouse," a series of classic and original radio dramas hosted by Dr. Morgan, produced over 200 episodes between 1986 and 1991. Dr. Morgan died in 1993, and the show is used for syndication and an informal tape-trading network.
- "The Drum," formerly hosted by DJ Kevvy Kev (Kevin Montague), was the world's longest-running hip-hop radio show until it went off air in the summer of 2011. It aired under this name since the late 1970s, but evolved from an earlier program called "Rhythms" that began airing some years earlier. John Graham hosted "The Drum" until 1981. Jonathan Brown (aka Johnny Afro) was host from 1981-1989. The last host, Kevvy Kev, was involved since 1984. Other Drum co-hosts from the period of 1984-1989 were DJ Easy Lou, Dj Rockmaster Marski, Rich D, & KutMasta Kurt.
- "What Would Your Mother Say?", hosted by Susan Morris and produced by Sarah Buer, was an edgy talk show discussing life issues relevant to young people. Each week, a panel of four college students, Morris, and a mother met face-to-face interviewed a guest expert (an author, psychologist or pundit), on these subjects.
- "Wednesday Night Live" is a weekly showcase of local band talent which has run since the late 1980s. Bands which have performed live in KZSU's "Outer A" studio include Green Day and Primus.
- "Punker Than Puke" was a punk-oriented weekly program hosted by DJ Linus Up (Brent) and Johnny Gram in the early 1990s. Known for unscripted interviews with unscheduled Punk rock celebrities, surprise guests presented by the show included Jerry Only, Ian MacKaye, Chrissie Hynde, and San Francisco Area native Punk Rock musicians.
- On September 6, 2004, KZSU held a "short song marathon," consisting entirely of songs running one minute or less, with the goal of playing 1,000 songs in 1,000 minutes. A team of 18 disc jockeys succeeded played 1,104 songs in that span. Number 1,000 was “The Young Lady Who Married a Mule Driver,” by James Downer.
- In 2007, KZSU celebrated its 60th anniversary with a 60-hour music marathon, running from January 4–6, 2007. KZSU alumni joined current DJs for a retrospective focusing on one year per hour, beginning with the music of 1947 and moving forward through 2006. Special programming also included a lecture on the history of the station, archived airchecks from previous years, and an interview with one of the station's founders.

Current programming at KZSU consists primarily of music, with an emphasis on independent new releases. KZSU's music library contained nearly 80,000 CDs and a similar number of vinyl discs as of December 2005.

The station is also notable for its commitment to Stanford athletics. In recent years KZSU has carried live coverage of eight Stanford team sports throughout the year (football, men's and women's basketball and soccer, baseball, women's volleyball and softball). KZSU also produces news and talk shows, and simulcasts meetings of the Palo Alto City Council, and services from Stanford Memorial Church.

- January 17, 1990 Green Day played live in the KZSU studios where they played some of their songs including "Disappearing Boy"{https://www.youtube.com/watch?v=0_R-7pk8lGQ}

== See also ==
- Campus radio
- List of college radio stations in the United States
