= Broadjam =

Broadjam Inc.
- Type: Private
- Founded: 1999
- Headquarters: Madison, Wisconsin, U.S.
- Key people: Roy Elkins, CEO
- Number of employees: approx. 10
- Website: broadjam.com

Broadjam is a music community website based in Madison, Wisconsin founded in September 1999. The service is aimed primarily at independent musicians. Users are able to interact with other artists, enter contests, and collaborate with peers through email, reviews, blogs and other social networking tools. Broadjam also works with related industries to provide various licensing opportunities, including placement in films, tv shows, advertising campaigns and video games in addition to radio play and professional reviews.

Broadjam claims to be one of the world's largest web communities catering to independent musicians. The site has an online database of over 500,000 searchable songs and is home to approximately 110,000 artists from all over the world. The company was founded by Roy Elkins with assistance from Stephanie Essex Elkins, a former corporate sales and marketing executive, classical singer, and classical music radio dj, with the intention to provide promotional services for unsigned musicians. Roy was formerly the vice president of sales and marketing at Sonic Foundry. Prior to that, Roy was training director at Ensoniq Corporation.

Broadjam offers a variety of services for artists to gain exposure and feedback. Musicians make up the bulk of the site's membership. Broadjam also offers template-based hosting services to help members create their own website.

== History ==
Broadjam was founded in 1999 and the site initially launched in 2000. Broadjam was originally headquartered in New Glarus, Wisconsin and moved in 2003 to Madison. The site was originally developed to provide services to independent musicians hoping to get their foot in the door of the music industry. Over time the service has evolved and now provides a wide range of services for artists, and music industry professionals.

== Features ==
Broadjam holds a variety of sponsored contests seeking to expose and reward exceptional musicianship and songwriting. Broadjam hosts a "Song of the Month" contests every month. Artist reviews and a scoring system based on "Good", "Better", or "Best" are used to determine a winner. Members may submit their songs for radio play, professional reviews, or placement in films, TV shows, commercials, and video games.

Music supervisors for film and television utilize Broadjam to find music for feature films, TV shows and commercials. Members give each another feedback through a reviewing mechanism. They review songs in a specific genre or random songs from the entire site. The highest rated songs appear in the Broadjam "Top 10s". Broadjam has over 200 different Top 10 charts sortable by genre, region, production style, and reviewer demographics. Broadjam calculates top 10s daily, based on factors which include song plays, downloads, reviews, and star ratings.

Broadjam offers site hosting services to premium members. Artists host their existing sites or create one using templates. Artists mark songs for download in the MP3 file format. Members may browse the Broadjam library by genre, region, production, or based on fan picks.

== Pro Services ==
As part of its Professional Services group, Broadjam provides an online mechanism which tallies votes in popular music award ceremonies. Current customers for the service include the Academy of Country Music and the Madison Area Music Awards.

Broadjam also provides a music encoding service. Major record labels use the service to encode, catalog, and control metadata.
