= WXDU =

Radio station at Duke University

- Durham, North Carolina; United States
- Broadcast area: Research Triangle Area of North Carolina
- Frequency: 88.7 MHz

Programming
- Format: Variety

Ownership
- Owner: Duke University

History
- First air date: October 1983

Technical information
- Licensing authority: FCC
- Facility ID: 17695
- Class: A
- Power: 2,150 watts
- HAAT: 77 meters (253 ft)
- Transmitter coordinates: 36°2′8.5″N 79°4′47″W

Links
- Public license information: Public file; LMS
- Webcast: Listen live
- Website: www.wxdu.org

WXDU (88.7 FM) is a non-commercial campus radio station broadcasting a college radio format. Licensed to Durham, North Carolina, United States, the station serves the Research Triangle area. The station is owned by Duke University.

== History ==
=== 1950 – WDBS ===
Student radio at Duke began in the late 1940s when the Undergraduate Men's Student Government Association formed a "radio council" to look into the possibility of establishing a campus radio station. Their efforts produced WDBS (Duke Broadcasting System), which signed on the air in 1950 on AM frequency 560.

WDBS's offices and studios were located in the basement of the Gray building. It used carrier current AM in order to broadcast to the university's dorms and union building. With carrier current, wires are placed in these buildings, and any radio plugged into an outlet in one of the buildings could receive AM 560. In the 1950s, this was the state-of-the-art way to broadcast.

The music shows featured hits of the day, as well as classical and jazz shows. The WDBS news and sports departments were nationally acclaimed, winning "Best College News Department" awards from 1956 to 1959. David Hartman, former host of Good Morning America, got his start at WDBS.

WDBS continued its broadcasting during the student activism of the 1960s, with its music programming changing to reflect students' changing tastes. WDBS was the first station to initiate a program exchange with Radio Moscow. Each week, the two stations would air the other's show, with complete translation of news and editorial comments. This program brought with it a lot of interest from the CIA, and it was eventually stopped.

While the WDBS sports staff was covering national championship teams, the news department was busy reporting on-campus events. The years 1967-69 were tumultuous ones on the Duke campus, and the WDBS news team was always there with live news coverage, even when the main quad was tear-gassed. In 1969, when student protesters took over both the Allen Building and the President's home, WDBS reporters were inside sending out the only live reports from the scene. WDBS also sent a reporter to the Republican and Democratic conventions in 1968; live reports were broadcast when Chicago police clashed with young demonstrators outside the Democratic convention hall.

FM radio had begun to achieve popularity in the late 1960s, as students were attracted to the advantages of stereo radio. The management of WDBS did not want to be left behind with its now-outdated carrier current system. In 1969, WDBS managers and University officials began the search for an FM frequency. With a $200,000 loan from the university, WDBS purchased the frequency 107.1 from the near-bankrupt WSRC. WDBS-FM signed on as Duke's new radio station in May 1971. They moved the studios into the once-condemned Bivins Building on East Campus.

In order to repay the loan, WDBS intended to operate as a commercial, profit-making station, while maintaining a student staff. However, the realities of commercial radio soon necessitated an entirely professional staff, as former student volunteers stayed on to become employees. By 1973, there was only a handful of student station members left, and WDBS was, for all practical purposes, no longer the Duke station.

In the early years, WDBS attracted a substantial following in the Triangle. It was one of the first free-form album rock stations in the Southeast, and its reputation grew as it expanded its programming to include blocks of classical and jazz music every day. The early WDBS certainly defined "alternative" radio.

WDBS was not without a major problem, though. The former students now managing it had no previous business experience, and in no time, WDBS was losing money by the truckload. The university continued to loan the station money just to meet its operating expenses. In the meantime, Duke students were without their own radio station. In the fall of 1974, with the help of WDBS and the university, a group of students resurrected the antiquated carrier current system, and turned an old classroom next door to the Bivins building into their studios. WDUR signed on the air at 1600 AM.

=== 1974 – WDUR/WDUK ===
WDUR received constant trouble from the old transmission system. The station's small budget prevented them from buying any new equipment, and the old system had been allowed to deteriorate. Only a few dorms could receive an acceptable signal. Station engineers spent much of their time repairing the old transmission wires, only to have them go out again before too long.

WDUR's fortunes brightened during the 1975–76 school year when the station officially became a student activity, and began receiving funding from the Associated Students of Duke University (ASDU). Reception was improved, and the station set up a direct line to the CI. The station grew, and developed into a tight Top 40 format. "Duke Radio 16", as it was called, then added progressive rock and jazz shows, and a juke box named "Otto", which automatically played singles at night, keeping the station on the air 24 hours a day. Otto would insert taped messages to identify the station at regular intervals. This sort of operation was legal because of WDUR's carrier-current status; a regular broadcast station could not operate automatically under the law.

During the summer of 1977, a local commercial station petitioned the Federal Communications Commission (FCC) for the call letters WDUR. Since a carrier current station is unlicensed, and actually makes up its own call letters, the FCC granted the commercial station's request. The Duke station became WDUK.

While all this was happening, WDBS continued to pile up a huge debt, losing much favor with the administration in the process. By 1978, this debt was said to be over $400,000.

Progressive rock grew to make up half of WDUK's programming, but the continued weak reception prompted management to look into alternatives. The decision was made to research the possibility of going FM. 1980 ended with two significant announcements: an open frequency had been found for an FM station (88.7), and WDBS was moving off-campus, allowing WDUK to move into larger studios.

Getting an FM station on the air is no trivial task: among other things, WDUK would need a large amount of funding, university support, an FCC license, and a place to put the transmitter. The decision on where to put the transmitter was pivotal. Due to nearby stations of 88.5 and 88.9, a new station on 88.7 would not be able to operate at a very high power level. If the transmitter were put on campus, it could operate at a couple of hundred watts of power, and could reach almost a hundred square miles. If the transmitter were put at a location in the Duke Forest in Hillsborough, North Carolina, it could operate at over one thousand watts, and could reach over three hundred square miles. The latter option would be a gamble, however, as studies showed that reception on campus could turn out to be marginal.

Enticed by the offer of a larger coverage area, the management decided to put the transmitter in Hillsborough, and an FCC application was prepared (a lengthy process). WDUK continued to operate, and by this time progressive rock had entirely taken over the station's programming. Disaster was to strike, though; in January 1982, just as WDBS had finally left and WDUK was getting ready to begin building its new studios, the 32-year-old transmission system died. The entire spring semester of 1982 was spent repairing the old transmitters.

=== 1983 – WXDU ===
WDUK was finally back on the air by the 82–83 school year. Situated in its new studios, the station fine-tuned its progressive format in anticipation of going FM. As it turned out, the FCC acted surprisingly quickly on the university's application for an FM station, and on December 1, 1982, the university was notified that its request had been approved. Since a commercial station with the call letters WDUK already existed, the name of the station was changed to WXDU.

With a resounding 98% vote, the student body approved a referendum allocating $76,000 of their activities fee for the construction of the new FM station. Vice President William Griffith, one of the original members of the student "radio council" that founded WDBS in the late 1940s, provided additional funding. As construction progressed, WDUK continued to get attention by being the only station in the country to provide live coverage of the Duke-Indiana NCAA soccer championship game.

In October 1983, with the song "Station to Station" by David Bowie, WXDU signed on the air, and a new era of Duke radio had begun.

As it turned out, coverage on campus was indeed marginal. In 1984, the station applied for and received FCC approval of an antenna change that would bring the station's Effective Radiated Power up to a level of 1600 watts. This improved coverage, but WXDU was still not providing adequate service to campus. During the 1986–87 school year, the management researched the possibility of putting an FM broadcast translator station on campus. A translator would pick up the station's main signal on 88.7, shift it to another frequency, and re-transmit it at a low power level. But because a translator could be located on the campus, this power level would be enough to provide excellent service to those who could not receive the station at all.

The frequency 90.7 was chosen for the translator, and an FCC application was submitted in June 1987. The application for 1-watt translator W214AF (90.7 MHz), transmitting from the West Campus bell tower, was granted in September 1987, and the translator went on the air at the start of 1988. When North Carolina Central University received a license to build WNCU on 90.7 FM in the early 1990s, W214AF shifted to 103.5 as W278AB. It discontinued licensed operation in the early 2000s.

Over the next five years, WXDU developed a national reputation for the progressive music it played, and the growing local music scene it promoted.

During the 1992–93 school year, WXDU left the supervision of the student government and joined the Duke University Union, providing more growth opportunities for the station. WXDU can now, for instance, sponsor concerts on campus at the Coffeehouse, and pool resources with other union groups such as Cable 13 and Major Attractions. The move also brought much-needed financial support to WXDU, and has allowed the station to refurbish the dilapidated studio equipment and furniture.

In the years since then WXDU has continued to flourish with the support of the union. The station has maintained a national reputation for great music, and in the late 1990s/early 2000s (decade), the station's Country/Bluegrass/Folk programming has been noted on both the local and national levels.

During Hurricane Fran in 1996, the WXDU tower collapsed and the station spent the next 2 years virtually off the air with a very limited signal. Through a series of benefits and through the generosity of the Duke Union, WXDU was able to raise a new tower, just east of highway 86, south of I-85, with an effective radiated power (ERP) of 2150 watts, at a height above average terrain of 77 meters, or 253 feet. The signal is also directional (see FCC engineering data below), with full power toward the northeast, and lower powers in other directions. It is lowest toward the southeast (between Durham and Chapel Hill), where the null is 1/3 the full power value, or about 716 watts.

In 2018, WXDU moved to new, custom-designed studio space in the new Rubenstein Arts Center.

== Management ==
WXDU is run and managed by an executive board of members who oversee all aspects of the radio station. Each year, WXDU holds elections and the DJ community has a say in electing their representatives. The roles within the executive board entail the General Manager, a position that is only eligible to students, Programming Director, Music Director, Non Musical Programming Director, Promotions Director, and DJ representative.

== Specialty shows ==
WXDU airs a variety of specialty shows that are managed by specific DJs. Some of these shows are then open to all WXDU DJs, old and new, every week as an opportunity to learn about different types of music genres.

- Professor G's Musical Odyssey
- Out There a Minute
- The Loud Show
- Local Music Hour
- Mystery Show
- Pinhook Country Soul Song Book
- Who's Got The Cuckoo?!
- The Bull City Cosmic Hoedown
- Mixed Reality
- Bully City
- Tokyo Rewind
