= SoundClick =

Music-based social community

- Website type: Music-based social network
- Owner: privately held
- Creators: Tanju Canli, Tolgar Canli
- Website: soundclick.com
- Commercial: Yes
- Registration: Optional
- Launched: 13 August 1997; 29 years ago

SoundClick is a music-based social community, primarily marketed towards producers and independent artists. Songs can be streamed, downloaded in MP3 format, sold through the store, or licensed to others. SoundClick compiles daily charts for various genres, based on undisclosed factors. The social-network offers profile pages with friends networking, photo, video, blogs, and user stations.

== History ==
SoundClick was founded in 1997 by twin brothers Tanju and Tolgar Canli. The site initially worked with RealAudio audio streams, and switched later to the now prevailing MP3 file format for audio streams and downloads. SoundClick was incorporated in 1999 in California by law firm Wilson Sonsini Goodrich & Rosati.

In 2007, SoundClick launched its own social network.

Today SoundClick reports 4.5 million songs, 530,000 bands and artists, and over 4.5 million registered members. SoundClick is a privately held company.

== Features ==
=== Free music services ===
SoundClick allows unlimited upload of songs in MP3 file format. The songs can be offered as streams only, as free downloads, or they can be sold through the SoundClick music store. Songs can be licensed to others either under a free Creative Commons license or under a paid license. The artist page can contain news, tour calendar, and information about their group/project.

=== Optional fee-based services ===
The most prominent of the fee-based service is the VIP service. It gives the artist more freedom in site design, the VIP page is free of advertisements. The songs can be uploaded in higher sound quality. VIP artists receive a discount for other promotional tools.

=== Music store ===
Songs can be sold through the site’s music store. While this service started with a prepayment system, it's now available with direct PayPal payments and no longer requires a minimum. The artists can sell their songs either as single songs or as MP3 albums. The price can be set by the artist. The artist keeps 85% for a sale through the site (90% for VIP accounts) and is paid weekly via PayPal.

=== Social network ===
Users get their own profile page, where they can network with online friends. The page features photo albums, video uploads, blogs, and message boards. Users can create their own stations, where they can make their selection of SoundClick songs available to the public.
