= JDub Records =

- Founded: December 2002
- Founder: Aaron Bisman, Ben Hesse
- Defunct: July 2011
- Distributor: The Orchard (Sony Music)
- Genre: Jewish music, Reggae, Klezmer, World music
- Country of origin: United States
- Location: New York City

JDub Records was a non-profit record and event production company that produced Jewish music and cross cultural musical dialogue. JDub, unlike most record labels, derived half its annual income from foundations and individual donors and the other half from record and ticket sales. As a non-profit Jewish organization, its stated mission was to "forge vibrant connections to Judaism through music, media and cultural events." JDub operations included an artists' fellowship program, overseeing the Jewcy website, event production and consulting.

Along with the Foundation for Jewish Culture and Avoda Arts, JDub launched The Six Points Fellowship for Emerging Jewish Artists, an artist development program financed by $1 million from the Commission on Jewish Identity and Renewal of UJA-Federation. The grant, described as the largest ever by UJA to an arts organization, gave each of 12 New York-based artists up to $45,000 for living expenses and project-related support for two years. The New York program closed in 2013 when UJA-Federation declined to renew its grant, redirecting resources toward Israel education and Jewish engagement programs. A UJA-Federation official stressed the decision was not a reflection of Six Points' performance, saying the fellowship had "made an incredible impact on the field."

As of 2012, JDub's recording catalogue is owned by The Orchard, a division of Sony Music.

== History ==
Founded in December 2002 by two NYU students, Ben Hesse and Aaron Bisman. In its start-up phase, JDub focused on developing a small cadre of artists, including Matisyahu, Socalled, and Balkan Beat Box. In October 2009, JDub adopted Jewcy, an online magazine and blog. JDub COO Jacob Harris led the acquisition and served as publisher of Jewcy.

On July 1, 2004, JDub produced "The Unity Sessions" at Celebrate Brooklyn in Prospect Park, Brooklyn. The event brought Israeli, Palestinian, Jewish, and American Muslim performers including Matisyahu, Sagol 59, TN (Tamer Nafar), and Mooke.

On October 28, 2004, JDub released Matisyahu's debut album, Shake Off the Dust... Arise.

In December 2009, JDub announced a strategic partnership with Nextbook which publishes books in collaboration with Random House's Shocken imprint, and produces Tablet Magazine. According to the JTA: "Under the partnership, the two organizations will remain separate and will still produce their own records and books and cultural materials, but JDub will essentially become Nextbook’s in-house marketing and PR department."

In July 2011 JDub announced it would close, with Bisman citing the collapse of the music industry, recessionary effects on foundation funding, and the organization having "aged out" of the cohort of Jewish cultural startups that had launched together in the early 2000s. Over its nine years JDub released 35 albums, with its commercial success driven primarily by Matisyahu, whose albums Live at Stubb's and Youth were both certified gold. In January 2012, JDub sold its recording catalogue to The Orchard, a division of Sony Music.

== Artists ==
JDub signed and developed artists across a range of genres including reggae, klezmer, world music, and hip hop. Its roster included:

- Balkan Beat Box
- Can Can
- Axum
- Golem
- The LeeVees
- Soulico
- Matisyahu (2003-2006, Management; 2003-2005, Label)
- Michael Showalter (comedian)
- Girls in Trouble
- The Macaroons
- Socalled
- Sagol 59
- DeLeon
- Tomer Yosef (lead MC of Balkan Beat Box)
- The Sway Machinery
- The Wailing Wall
- Steve "The Gangsta Rabbi" Lieberman

== See also ==
- Jewcy
- Matisyahu
- Balkan Beat Box
- Tablet Magazine
- Jewish music
