= Emeka =

- Gender: Male
- Language: Igbo

Origin
- Origin: Igboland
- Meaning: Done great

Other names
- Alternative spelling: Chiemeka, Olisaemeka, Osemeka, Osemeke Nnaemeka, Chukwuemeka, Chukwuemeke
- Short forms: Emeka, Emeke

Emeka // is a male given name and surname of Igbo origin. As a given name it is typically derived from either Chukwuemeka (God has done great) or Nnaemeka (the father has done great).

== Notable people with the surname "Emeka" include ==
- Anthony Emeka (born 1990), Nigerian footballer
- Chinonso Emeka (born 2001), Nigerian footballer
- Francis Emeka (born 1990), Nigerian footballer
- Princewill Emeka (born 1992), Nigerian footballer

== Notable people with the given name "Emeka" include ==
=== A ===
- Emeka Ananaba (born 1945), Nigerian politician
- Emeka Ani, Nigerian actor
- Emeka Anyaoku (born 1933), Nigerian diplomat
- Emeka Atuloma (born 1992), Nigerian footballer

=== E ===
- Emeka Egbuka (born 2002), American football player
- Emeka Emerun (born 1994), Nigerian footballer
- Emeka Enejere (1944–2016), Nigerian academic
- Emeka Eneli (born 1999), American soccer player
- Emeka Eze (disambiguation), multiple people
- Emeka Jude Ezeonu (born 1991), Nigerian footballer
- Emeka Ezeugo (born 1965), Nigerian footballer

=== I ===
- Emeka Ifejiagwa (born 1977), Nigerian footballer
- Emeka Ihedioha (born 1965), Nigerian politician
- Emeka Ike (born 1967), Nigerian actor
- Emeka Ilione (born 2002), English rugby league footballer

=== M ===
- Emeka Mamale (born 1977), Congolese footballer

=== N ===
- Emeka Nnamani (footballer) (born 2001), Danish footballer
- Emeka Nnamani (politician), Nigerian politician
- Emeka Nwabueze (born 1949), Nigerian professor
- Emeka Nwadike (born 1978), English footballer
- Emeka Nwajiobi (born 1959), Nigerian footballer
- Emeka Nwokedi, Nigerian conductor

=== O ===
- Emeka Obi (born 2001), English-Nigerian footballer
- Emeka Obidile (born 1977), Nigerian footballer
- Emeka Offor (born 1959), Nigerian entrepreneur
- Emeka Ogboh (born 1977), Nigerian sound artist
- Emeka Ogbugh (born 1990), Nigerian footballer
- Emeka Oguzie (born 1972), Nigerian chemist
- Emeka Okafor (born 1982), American basketball player
- Emeka Okereke (born 1980), Nigerian photographer
- Emeka Ononye (born 1992), Canadian soccer player
- Emeka Onowu (born 1984), Nigerian politician
- Emeka Onwuamaegbu (born 1959), Nigerian general
- Emeka Onyemaechi (born 1974), Nigerian judoka
- Emeka Opara (born 1984), Nigerian footballer
- Emeka Ossai, Nigerian actor
- Emeka Odiah, The technology entrepreneur

=== S ===
- Emeka Sibeudu (born 1958), Nigerian politician

=== U ===
- Emeka Udechuku (born 1979), English discus thrower
- Emeka Jude Ugali (born 1982), Nigerian footballer
- Emeka Umeh (born 1999), Nigerian footballer
