= Chuks =

Chuks is a masculine Nigerian given name, diminutive of various names that begin with Chukwu- (God): such as, Chukwuebuka, Chukwuemeka, Chukwudi, Chukwuka, Chukwuma, and Chukwunonso. It is not considered a formal name. Notable people with this name include:

- Chuks Aneke (born 1993), English professional footballer
- Chuks Anyaduba (born 1984), Nigerian filmmaker and lawyer
- Chuks D General, Nigerian stand-up comedian
- Chuks Joseph, Nigerian actor, model, and influencer
- Chuks Omalicha (born 1985), Nigerian film actor, entrepreneur, and producer
