= Onah =

Nigerian surname

Onah is a Nigerian surname. Notable people with the name include:

- Adoga Onah (born 1940), former Nigerian Ambassador whose diplomatic postings included Sweden, the Philippines, and the United States
- Anthony Onah, Nigerian-American film director, screenwriter, and producer
- Chukwuebuka Onah (born 2000), Nigerian footballer
- Godfrey Onah, Nigerian Catholic prelate
- Julius Onah (born 1983), Nigerian-American filmmaker
- Rose Onah, Nigerian academic and public administrator
