= Kiddushin =

Kiddushin may refer to:

- Erusin or Kiddushin, sanctification or dedication, also called erusin (betrothal), the first of the two stages of the Jewish wedding process.
- Kiddushin (Talmud), the last tractate of the third order of the Mishnah Nashim.
