= Nnaemeka =

- Gender: Male
- Language: Igbo

Origin
- Meaning: The father has done great
- Region of origin: Igboland

Other names
- Related names: Chukwuemeka, Emeka

Nnaemeka // is a male given name and surname of Igbo origin. It means "the father has done great", and can be synonymous with Chukwuemeka, where "father" is interpreted to mean God (Chukwu).

== As a given name ==
- Nnaemeka Alfred Achebe (born 1941), 21st Obi of Onitsha, a traditional chieftancy in Nigeria
- Nnaemeka Ikegwuonu (born 1981 or 1982), Nigerian entrepreneur and radio broadcaster
- Nnaemeka Ajuru (born 1986), Nigerian footballer
- Nnaemeka Anyamele (born 1994), Finnish footballer

== As a middle name ==
- Samuel Nnaemeka Anyanwu (born 1965), Nigerian business executive

== As a surname ==
- Obioma Nnaemeka (born 1948), Nigerian-American academic
- Philip Nnaemeka-Agu (1928-2011), Nigerian jurist
