= Chukwuebuka =

- Gender: Male
- Language: Igbo

Origin
- Meaning: God is great
- Region of origin: Igboland

Other names
- Short form: Ebuka

Chukwuebuka // is a male given name of the Igbo people from the southeastern region of Nigeria. The direct English translation is “God is great”. Its diminutive form is “Ebuka”.

Ebuka (Short form of Chukwuebuka) - pronunciation

== Notable people with this name ==
- Ebuka Obi-Uchendu (born 14 July 1982), Nigerian media personality
- Evangelist Ebuka Obi, Nigerian Catholic preacher and prophet
- Chukwuebuka Enekwechi (born 1993), Nigerian athlete
- Chukwuebuka Ezugha, Nigerian footballer
- Chukwuebuka Onah (born 2000), Nigerian footballer
