= Chukwuemeka =

- Gender: Male
- Language: Igbo

Origin
- Origin: Southeast Nigeria
- Meaning: God has done great

Other names
- Alternative spelling: Chiemeka
- Short form: Emeka

Chukwuemeka // is a common Igbo male name and surname meaning "God has done great". It is commonly shortened to Emeka.

== Notable people bearing the names ==
- Caleb Chukwuemeka (born 2002), English footballer
- Carney Chukwuemeka (born 2003), Austrian-English footballer
- Vivian Chukwuemeka (born 1975), Nigerian shot-putter
- Chukwuemeka Chikelu, Nigerian lawyer and politician
- Chukwuemeka Ezeife (1939–2023), governor of Anambra State, Nigeria from 1992 to 1993
- Chukwuemeka Ezeugo, known as "Reverend King", Nigerian Christian preacher
- Chukwuemeka Fred Agbata (born 1979), Nigerian journalist, entrepreneur and public speaker
- Chukwuemeka Ike (1931–2020), born Vincent Chukwuemeka Ike, Nigerian writer
- Chukwuemeka Nwajiuba (born 1967), Nigerian politician and lawyer
- Chukwuemeka Odumegwu Ojukwu (1933–2011), secessionist leader of the state of Biafra during the Nigerian Civil War
- Chukwuemeka Odumegwu Ojukwu University, educational establishment named for the above
- Chukwuemeka Ujam (born 1974), Nigerian politician

== Emeka ==
- Emeka Okafor, American basketball player
- Emeka Nwadike, English footballer
- Emeka Udechuku, British discus thrower
- Emeka Onwuamaegbu, Nigerian general
- Emeka Onyemachi, Nigerian judoka
- Emeka Ihedioha, Nigerian politician and businessman
- Emeka Woke, Nigerian engineer and politician
- Emeka Ngozi Wogu, Nigerian lawyer and politician

== See also ==
- Chuks
