= Nonso =

Nonso is a Nigerian male given name, a diminutive of Chinonso and Chukwunonso. It is occasionally given standalone, legally, but still treated as a diminutive culturally.

Notable people with the name include:

- Nonso Amadi (born 1995), Nigerian singer, songwriter, and music producer
- Nonso Anozie (born 1979), British actor
- Nonso Diobi (born 1976), Nigerian actor and director
