= Reverend King =

Reverend King may refer to:

- Martin Luther King Jr., an American Baptist minister and civil rights activist from 1954 through 1968
- Martin Luther King Sr., an American Baptist minister and father of Martin Luther King, Jr.
- Reverend King (Nigerian pastor), a Nigerian pastor convicted of murder
