= Marriage in the Bible =

Marriage in the Bible is important to both Judaism and Christianity:

- Christian views on marriage
- Jewish views on marriage
