= Kiddushin (Talmud) =

Tractate in Mishnah and Talmud

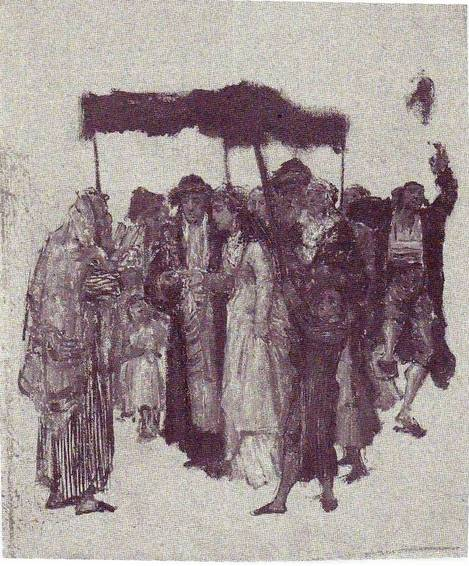
- Jewish Wedding (sketch), by Maurycy Gottlieb (1856–1879)

Tractate of the Talmud
- Seder: Nashim
- Number of mishnahs: 46
- Chapters: 4
- Babylonian Talmud pages: 82
- Jerusalem Talmud pages: 48
- Tosefta chapters: 5

Kiddushin (Hebrew: קִידּוּשִׁין) is a masekhet or tractate of the Mishnah and the Talmud, composed in Babylon circa 450–550 CE, and is part of the order of Nashim. The content of the tractate primarily deals with the legal provisions related to halakhic engagement and marriage.

In Jewish law, an engagement (kiddushin) is a contract between a man and a woman where they mutually promise to marry each other, and the terms on which it shall take place. The promise may be made by the intending parties or by their respective parents or other relatives on their behalf.

== Structure ==
Kiddushin consists of 4 chapters. It has 46 mishnahs and 82 pages gemara. It is included in both Talmuds.

According to Sherira Gaon in his letter, the first sugya (literary unit) in the Babylonian Talmud of Kiddushin is a Saboraic or Geonic addition and was not written by Amoraim like the rest of the Talmud. The sugya focuses on stylistic and grammatical issues that bear no halachic or aggadic implications. Nevertheless, Yitzchok Zilberstein ruled that one cannot make a siyum if he has not learned the opening sugya.

=== Chapter headings ===
1. Haisha Nikneis (הָאִשָּׁה נִקְנֵית)
2. Haish Mekadeish (ׁהָאִישׁ מְקַדֵּש)
3. Haomer (הָאוֹמֵר לַחֲבֵירוֹ)
4. Asara Yuchasin (עֲשָׂרָה יוּחֲסִין)

=== The Torah and Orthodox Jewish attitudes ===
The Torah gives examples of what is and is not permitted in Jewish Courting and marriages practices:Isaac properly courting his cousin Rebecca before marriage is a good example. Bad examples are: Shechem's rape-marriage of Dinah; Samson keep marrying non-Jewish Philistine women- as he was lead astry by his lustful eyes which was why he was blinded. Also The Torah warns that Jewish soldiers should not take a non Jewish female captive as a wife because the son from such a relationship will revolt against his father-as happened to King David and his son Prince Absalom. In Halakha marriage between a Jew and a gentile is both prohibited, and also void under Jewish law. All branches of Orthodox Judaism follow the historic Jewish attitudes to intermarriage, and therefore refuse to accept that intermarriages would have any validity or legitimacy, and strictly forbid sexual intercourse with a member of a different faith. Orthodox rabbis refuse to officiate at interfaith weddings, and also try to avoid assisting them in other ways. Secular intermarriage is seen as a deliberate rejection of Judaism, and an intermarried person is effectively cut off from most of the Orthodox community, although some Chabad-Lubavitch and Modern Orthodox Jews do reach out to intermarried Jews, especially Jewish women (because Orthodox Jewish law considers the children of Jewish women to be Jews regardless of the father's status). For Orthodox Jews marriage of a Jewish man with a Jewish woman is a reunion of two halves of the same Soul; thus for the Orthodox a Jewish man to have any relationship with a "Shiksa" (gentile woman) or a Jewish woman to have any relationship with a goy (gentile man) would be considered a disgrace. Some Orthodox families will sit shiva (Mourning) for someone who has married outside the faith because unless to prevent assimilation both the father and the mother teach both their sons and daughters to accept the Iron Yoke of the Torah, the chances are not good the child will be raised in the Jewish faith; hence the sitting of Shiva is mourning for successive generations of children who will not be raised Jewish. Hence to the Orthodox Jews Intermarriage is the "Silent Holocaust (Judaism)". The only legal way for children of such relationships to be part of a Jewish community, is for them of their own free will to willingly accept the Iron Yoke of the Torah with help from Orthodox Jewish guidance.
