= Chukwuma =

Chukwuma is a Nigerian name that means 'God knows'. It is an Igbo word. Notable people with the name include:

Given name

- Chukwuma Akabueze (born 1989), Nigerian football player
- Chukwuma Azikiwe (1940–2015), Nigerian diplomat and politician
- Chukwuma Kaduna Nzeogwu (1937–1967), Nigerian military officer
- Chukwuma Okorafor (born 1997), American football player

Surname

- Ben Chukwuma (born 2001), Nigerian-American football player
- Chrys Chukwuma (born 1978), American football running back
- Chukwudi Chukwuma (born 1994), Nigerian football player
- Clifford Chukwuma, Nigerian football coach and former player
- Charles Chukwuma Soludo (born 1960), Nigerian economist
- Ernest Jeremiah Chukwuma (born 1985), Nigerian football player
