= The Price (2017 film) =

- Theatrical release poster
- Directed by: Anthony Onah
- Written by: Anthony Onah
- Produced by: Justin Begnaud; Kishori Rajan; Anthony Onah
- Starring: Aml Ameen; Lucy Griffiths; Michael Hyatt; Peter Vack; Souléymane Sy Savané; Craig muMs Grant; Bill Sage
- Cinematography: David McFarland
- Edited by: Grant Myers
- Music by: Enis Rotthoff
- Production companies: Hacienda Motion Picture Company; Ten on 5 Productions; Water's End Productions; Infinitum Productions
- Distributed by: Orion Pictures; Samuel Goldwyn Films
- Release dates: March 13, 2017 (SXSW); November 10, 2017 (United States)
- Running time: 92 minutes
- Countries: United States; Nigeria
- Language: English

The Price is a 2017 American drama film written and directed by Anthony Onah. The film stars Aml Ameen, Lucy Griffiths, Peter Vack, Michael Hyatt, Souléymane Sy Savané, Craig muMs Grant, and Bill Sage.

The Price premiered in the Narrative Feature Competition at the 2017 South by Southwest Film Festival. Orion Pictures and Samuel Goldwyn Films released the film theatrically on November 10, 2017.

== Plot ==
Seyi Ogunde is the American son of Nigerian immigrants who live outside New York City. With single-minded focus, he’s attended a prestigious college and landed a competitive finance job. He’s both confident in his abilities and deeply insecure because of his outsider background. While he contends with life and career in New York, Seyi grapples with a turbulent family situation in Hackensack, New Jersey: his stroke-ridden father dreams of a return to Nigeria, his mother slaves as a nurse to help keep the home afloat, and his sister struggles to care for their infirm parent. Hovering over these family difficulties is a painful past incident that has yet to be reckoned with.

Seyi only endures the strain of work and family with the assistance of illegally acquired prescription drugs—and his dependence is deepening. Adding to this cocktail, Seyi meets Liz, a girl whose well-to-do background leads him to believe he must embellish his own in order to win her over. Dead set on both impressing Liz and fulfilling his family obligations, Seyi soon finds himself sliding into a highly fraudulent financial scheme–one that props up his short-term earnings but also leaves him at great risk.

As Seyi’s choices play out, he finds his life quickly spiraling out of control: the law pursues him because of his financial dealings; Liz discovers he’s not exactly who he’s claimed to be; and his prescription drug dependence grows stronger, ultimately landing him in the hospital. Everything comes to a head when his sick father suffers a second large stroke and the devastating family secret comes into the open. With Seyi’s relationships pulled apart and the Feds bearing down on him and his firm, he is forced to fully examine his choices.

== Cast ==
- Aml Ameen as Seyi Ogunde
- Lucy Griffiths as Liz Sloane
- Peter Vack as Alex Mueller
- Michael Hyatt as Ife Ogunde
- Hope Olaide Wilson as Funmi Ogunde
- Souléymane Sy Savané as Akin Ogunde
- Craig muMs Grant as Iji Upla
- Bill Sage as John Kocher

== Release ==
The film premiered on March 13, 2017 at the South by Southwest Film Festival, where it competed for the Grand Jury Award. Orion Pictures and Samuel Goldwyn Films subsequently acquired theatrical distribution rights to the film, and they released it on November 10, 2017.

== Reception ==
The Price was released to positive reviews from critics. Dennis Harvey, in his review for Variety magazine, says the film is "a thoughtfully crafted, elegant-looking indie drama that suggests a bright future for Onah" and "a first feature so assured on nearly all levels."

Glenn Kenny of RogerEbert.com praised the directing and writing, saying The Price is "brisk and coherent" and a "sharply observed film," giving it 3 out of 4 stars.

Joshua Starnes of ComingSoon.net called The Price "by far the best surprise of the small indie films" at the 2017 South by Southwest Film Festival, adding: "Pointed without ever falling into stereotypes, it’s a bold statement about modern immigrant life in America and not to be missed"

Rob Staeger, in his positive review for LA Weekly, writes that Onah puts his lead at "the center of a sharply drawn world, from the fearful racism he encounters on the streets to his struggles to please and/or ignore his mom (the excellent Michael Hyatt). Ameen holds that world together with his grounded presence, a driven young man struggling to calibrate his moral compass in the face of intense pressure."

On review-aggregator website Rotten Tomatoes, the film has an approval rating of 83% with an average rating of 6.4/10. On Metacritic, which uses a weighted average, the film has a score of 61 out of 100 indicating "generally favorable" reviews.

== Accolades ==
Awards
| Award | Date of ceremony | Category | Recipients and nominees | Result |
|---|---|---|---|---|
| South by Southwest Film Festival | March 14, 2017 | Grand Jury Prize | The Price | Nominated |
| Seattle International Film Festival | June 11, 2017 | FIPRESCI Prize in the New American Cinema Competition | The Price | Nominated |
| Indie Memphis Film Festival | November 5, 2017 | Craig Brewer Emerging Filmmaker Award | Anthony Onah | Won |
