= Afrinolly =

Mobile app focused on African entertainment

- Developer: FansConnectOnline LTD.
- Operating system: Google Android, BlackBerry OS, Apple iOS, Nokia Series 40, Nokia Asha platform, Symbian, and MS Windows Phone
- Available in: Multilingual
- Type: Entertainment
- License: Proprietary
- Website: www.afrinolly.com

Afrinolly is a mobile application (App) which enables African entertainment enthusiasts to watch African movies, movie trailers, short films and music videos that have been made public by content owners or their legal representative most especially from the Nollywood film industry. Afrinolly is available for free on Android, iOS, BlackBerry, Nokia, Windows Phone, Windows 8 and Java-enabled phones.

Afrinolly (Android version) was developed in 2011 in Nigeria and submitted for the Google Android Developers Challenge, Sub-Saharan Africa. After winning the competition, Afrinolly has been downloaded by over 4 million users and has grown to be the most downloaded Entertainment app, designed and developed in Africa.

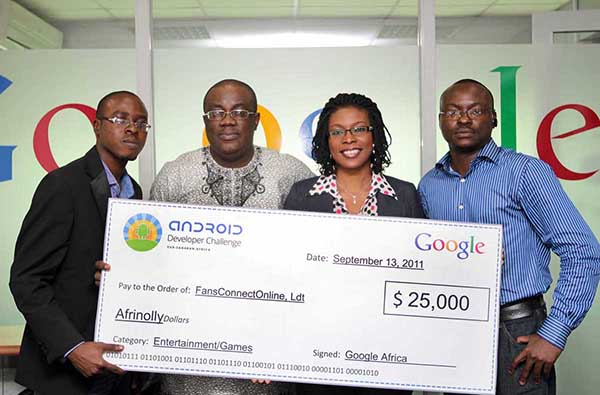
The initial set of people who came up with the Afrinolly Application. Chike Maduegbuna, CEO, Temitope Omotunde, Developer and Bobola Oniwura Creative Director.

== History ==
In September 2011, Afrinolly was announced winner in the Entertainment category of the first Google Android Developers Challenge, Sub-Saharan Africa in Nairobi, Kenya. After two rounds of scoring by an official panel of judges, one Nigerian app and two Kenyan apps emerged winners of the competition. Nigeria's Afrinolly app emerged a winner in the Entertainment/Media/Games category, awarded $25,000 to help them build and grow their business. In March 2012, IT News Africa; a Technology News Leader in Africa listed Afrinolly at one of the Top Ten African Mobile Apps describing it as "well designed, loads quickly, easy to navigate and an African version of IMDb.

In May 2012, Afrinolly signed a partnership deal with leading African telecommunications provider MTN Nigeria to help drive app consciousness among Nigerians and promote the Nollywood industry on mobile devices. Through a co-branding deal, the MTN Afrinolly partnership was launched delivering the Afrinolly experience to MTN's base of subscribers spread across Nigeria. In the same month, Afrinolly announced that it has over 450,000 downloads of its app on Android, Blackberry and Java.

In February 2013, Afrinolly announced that the app had crossed the 2 million app download mark. Afrinolly have seen a progressive growth rate in terms of downloads across Africa. Nigeria has the largest share of download with over 70%, Ghana, South-Africa and other African countries follow, USA, UK, Brazil, Saudi Arabia, Turkey, and India make up a majority of the rest.

In March 2013, Afrinolly announced the first African Entertainment App for BlackBerry 10 with the release of its app for Blackberry Z10 and Q10 at the Blackberry 10 official launch in Lagos, Nigeria. While in July 2013, Afrinolly announced the release of its app for Microsoft Windows Phone and Windows 8 scoring another first with its Windows 8 (PC) application as the first African entertainment app developed in Africa for the Windows 8 platform.

In September 2013, after having been downloaded over 3 million times across various mobile operating systems, Afrinolly signed a partnership deal with the leading African telecommunications giant MTN Group to not just drive app usage across the networks 16 operating countries in Africa but also to increase data usage. The MTN Afrinolly partnership was launched to deliver African Entertainment content via mobile devices to MTN's subscribers across the continent.

In August 2016, Facebook CEO Mark Zuckerberg visited Afrinolly Creative Hub in Lagos, Nigeria as part of his first ever visit to Sub-Saharan Africa. Zuckerberg wanted to see the creative hub of Nollywood, Nigeria's phenomenal film industry. Afrinolly Space is a creative hub created for the provision of creative platforms and economic opportunities for filmmakers, screenwriters, mobile technology developers, animators and other creatives. Essentially Afrinolly's studio The Afrinolly Creative Hub functions as "Where Technology Meets Art".

== Afrinolly Short Film Competition ==
In November 2012, Afrinolly launched the first edition of the Afrinolly Short Film Competition, a video-based competition targeted at developing film-makers and documentary/animation content creators. The competition aimed at showcasing African talent online, and providing a platform to foster the creation of new online content produced by Africans was supported by MTN Nigeria, BlackBerry, iRep, and Goethe-Institut.

The competition was conceived entirely as an online challenge open to Africans from across the world who are creating or who have created short films or / and documentary films up to 15 minutes long. Participants are expected to upload their films to a dedicated competition website and the finalists are selected by a panel of judges and public voting. Members of the panel of judges included award-winning Nollywood movie producers – Tunde Kelani, Femi Odugbemi and Obi Emelonye. Hollywood writer/producer and curator of The Black List Franklin Leonard, Mahen Bonetti of the New York African Film Festival and Nmachi Jidenma blogger and founder of Celebrating Progress Africa (CP-Africa) among others.

With $100,000 in cash and prizes, the Afrinolly Short Film Competition soon became the most prestigious short film and documentary competition in Africa. A breakdown of the cash prize shows that the overall winner in both Short Film and Documentary categories went home with $25,000, the first runner up got $10,000 and the second runner-up received $5,000. Fourth-place through tenth-place winners in both categories received $500 each.

=== Winners, season 1 ===
==== Short films ====
- First place: Dara Ju - By Anthony Onah
- Second place: The Promise - By Akin Okunrinboye
- Third place: To serve with all our Strength - By Ishaya Bako

==== Documentaries ====
- First place: Hustle On A Mile - By Bemigho Awala
- Second place: A short "DOCUMENTARY" - By Soji Oyinsan II
- Third place: Black and Gold - By Joseph Akwasi

=== Winners, season 2 ===
==== Short films ====
- First place: Everything Happens For A Reason - By Florian Schott
- Second place: Crimson - By Daniel Etim Effiong
- Third place: 10:10 - By Gbenga Salu

==== Documentaries ====
- First place: Creative Minds - By Victor Okoye
- Second place: Awele's Diary" - By Ronke Ogunmakin
- Third place: Yellow Fever - By Ng’endo Mukii
