= Chukwuka =

- Gender: Male
- Language: Igbo

Origin
- Origin: Nigeria
- Meaning: God is great/mighty
- Region of origin: Igboland

Chukwuka // is a male given name and surname of Igbo origin. It means "God is great" or "God is mighty”. It can be used in longer names, such us Chukwukadibia (God is greater than a doctor) and Chukwukamma (God is the best).

== Notable people with this given name ==
- Ckay (Chukwuka Ekweani) (born 1995), Nigerian singer
- Chukwuka Onuwa Emmanuel (born 1996), Nigerian footballer
- Chukwuka Eze (born 1996), Software Developer

== Notable people with this surname ==
- Chioma Chukwuka (born 1980), Nigerian actress
- Cyril Chukwuka Anyanwu, Nigerian Anglican bishop
- Humphrey Chukwuka, Nigerian retired Army Major
- Okoli Chukwuka (born 1980), Nigerian weightlifter
- Samuel Chibueze Chukwuka, Nigerian Anglican Bishop
- Utazi Chukwuka, Nigerian politician
