= Franklin Leonard =

American film executive

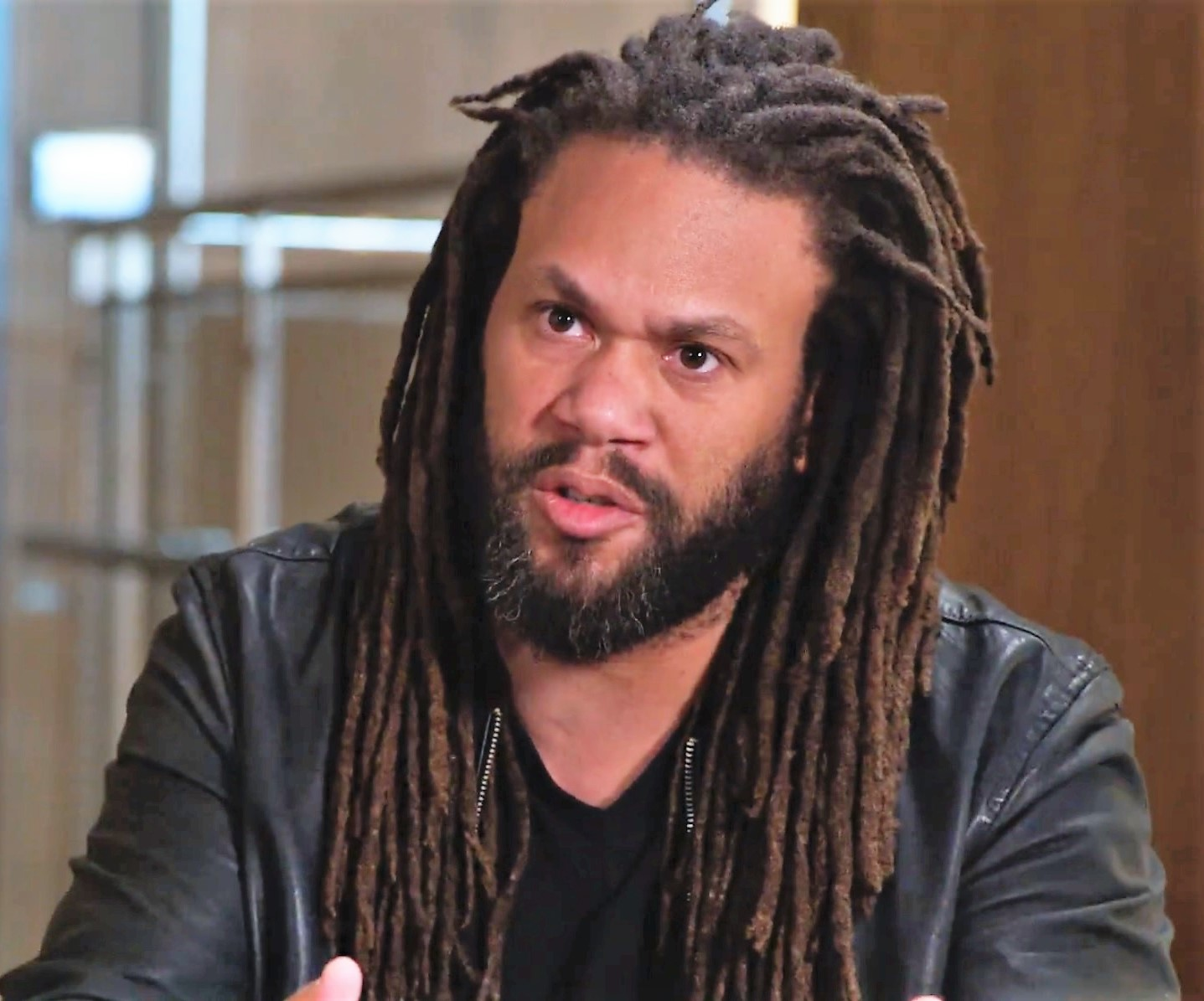
- Leonard for Mercer in 2018
- Education: Harvard University (BA)
- Occupation: Film executive
- Known for: Founder of The Black List

Franklin Leonard is an American film producer. He created the Black List in 2004, an annual publication that ranks unproduced screenplays. He served as a development executive for Will Smith's Overbrook Entertainment from 2010 to 2012, having previously served as Director of Development and Production at Universal Pictures from 2008 to 2010. In 2012, he began serving as an advisor for BoomGen Studios, as well as for Plympton, Inc. the following year. In 2017, he began serving as a board member for the art education non-profit Young Storytellers.

== Career ==
Franklin graduated from Harvard University in 2000 with a Bachelor of Arts, magna cum laude, in social studies. He then began his career as the communications director for John Cranley's campaign for the United States House of Representatives in Ohio's first district. He went on to work as a columnist for the Trinidad Guardian, as an analyst for McKinsey & Company, and as an assistant for Creative Artists Agency.

Beginning in 2004, Leonard worked as a development executive for John Goldwyn Productions, Appian Way Productions, and Mirage Entertainment. While working at Appian Way in 2005, he came up with the concept behind "The Black List," forwarding a spreadsheet to seventy-five fellow producers to collect the names of well-known but unproduced screenplays. Soon successful, The Black List was adapted into a website and has provided over two hundred screenplays which later became feature films.

Leonard went on to become one of the youngest executives at Universal Pictures, serving as director of Development and Production. Two years later, he was vice president of Creative Affairs at Will Smith's production company, Overbrook Entertainment. Leonard shared the title with Smith's brother-in-law Caleeb Pinkett, and left the company after two years.

Besides his full-time work on The Black List, Leonard is currently an adviser to Plympton, a literary studio that specializes in serialized fiction, and BoomGen Studios, where he assisted in developing the transmedia graphic novel 1001. He is also a judge for the Afrinolly Short Film Competition; Africa's short film competition with a $25,000 first place cash prize. He currently serves on the board of directors for Young Storytellers, an arts education nonprofit organization.

Franklin is also an executive producer of the film Come as You Are, distributed by Samuel Goldwyn Films.
