= Africa Center of Excellence in Future Energies & Electrochemical Systems =

Research centre in Imo State, Nigeria

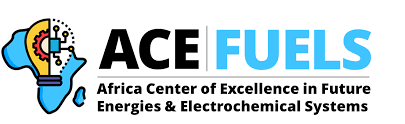
- Abbreviation: ACE-FUELS
- Formation: 2019
- Type: Research Group
- Location: FUTO, Nigeria
- Center Director: Prof. Emeka Oguzie
- Website: www.acefuels-futo.org

The Africa Center of Excellence in Future Energies & Electrochemical Systems (ACE-FUELS) is a research, development and training group based in the Federal University of Technology Owerri. The Center offers master's and doctorate degrees, as well as professional certificate programmes.

ACE-FUELS was established mainly to provide knowledge in the area of renewable and other clean energy sources, in order to mitigate the challenge of inadequate access to energy in Subsaharan Africa.

== History ==
ACE-FUELS was set up in 2019 under the World Bank Africa Center of Excellence (ACE) Impact Project. The Center has four areas of focus: Clean energy, Electrochemical systems, Corrosion protection and Advanced Functional Materials.

== Academics ==
=== Degrees ===
ACE-FUELS offers bespoke master's and doctorate degree programs in Future Energies, Nanotechnology, Electrochemical Technology, and Corrosion Technology. The 18-month full time master's and 36-month doctorate program in Future Energies focus on solar, wind, hydro, geothermal, biomass, as well as hydrogen energy, clean hydrocarbon fuels and carbon capture/sequestration.

=== Education & Training ===
ACE-FUELS offers a number of master's, doctorate and professional certificate programmes.

Programme (MSc/PhD)	Scope
Future Energies	Renewable energy (solar, wind, hydro, geothermal, biomass), clean hydrocarbon fuels, carbon capture & sequestration
Nanotechnology	Nano synthesis & characterization, functional materials, energy materials, natural nanomaterials, nanocatalysis
Electrochemical Technology	Electrochemical energy & storage devices (fuel cells, batteries, supercapacitors) Environmental Electrochemistry
Corrosion Technology	Corrosion monitoring & protection, anti-corrosion additives, coatings, corrosion modelling
