= ColdHubs =

Solar powered cooling company

- Industry: Solar-powered cooling
- Founded: 2015
- Headquarters: Owerri, Imo State, Nigeria
- Area served: Nigeria
- Key people: Nnaemeka Ikegwuonu - CEO
- Website: www.coldhubs.com

ColdHubs Ltd. is an Owerri-based company that provides solar-powered cold storage solutions for small-scale farmers.

== History ==
ColdHubs was founded in 2015 in Owerri, Imo State, Nigeria. In addition to its headquarters, the company has offices in Fort Collins, Colorado.

== Services ==
ColdHubs provides cooling services to small-scale farmers and fishermen, who rent 20 kg capacity crates to store their products at the hubs that are available all year round.

ColdHubs operates at 54 locations, in 22 states throughout Nigeria, with site locations near farms. Each three-metre-square units can hold three tonnes of food. The sun's power cools the units during the day and charges the batteries that operate the refrigeration in the evening.

== People ==
ColdHubs was founded and is run by former farmer Nnaemeka Ikegwuonu. As of 2021, it employed 66 people.

== Awards ==
In 2017, ColdHubs was shortlisted for the UK Royal Academy of Engineering's Africa Prize for Engineering Innovation. It won the 2020 Waislitz Global Citizen Disruptor Award and was the inaugural AYuTe Africa Challenge winner in 2021.

== See also ==
- Smallholding
- Cold chain
- Solar air conditioning
