= Chukwudi =

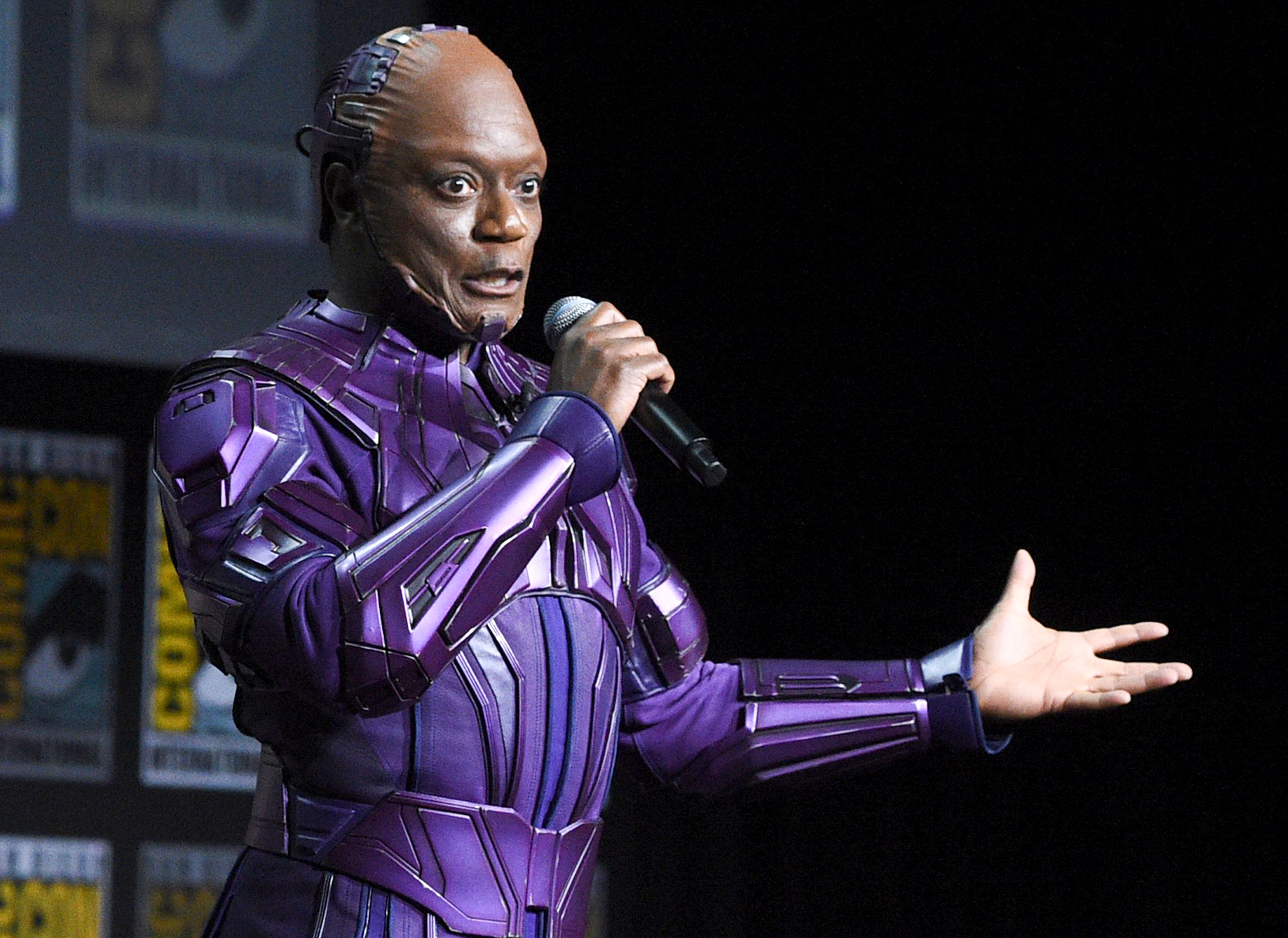
- Chukwudi Iwuji at San Diego Comic-Con in 2022
- Gender: Male
- Language: Igbo

Origin
- Meaning: God lives
- Region of origin: Igboland

Chukwudi is a male given name and surname of Igbo origin that means “God lives”.

== Notable people with this given name ==
- Chukwudi Chijindu (born 1986), American association football player
- Chukwudi Chukwuma (born 1994), Nigerian football player
- Chukwudi Iwuji (born 1975), Nigerian-born British actor

== Notable people with this surname ==
- Emmanuel Chukwudi Eze (1963–2007), Nigerian-born American philosopher
- Ogonna Chukwudi (born 1988), Nigerian football midfielder
