= Adoga Onah =

Nigerian diplomat

- Born: January 20, 1940; Okpoma, Cross River State, Nigeria
- Died: May 28, 2009 (aged 69); Lagos, Lagos State, Nigeria
- Education: St Peter's College, Oxford
- Occupation: Diplomat
- Political party: People's Democratic Party
- Spouse: Justina Onah

Adoga Augustine Onah (born 20 January 1940) was a former Nigerian Ambassador whose diplomatic postings included Sweden, the Philippines, and the United States.

== Education and personal life ==
Born in Okpoma, Cross River State, Nigeria, Onah studied Politics and International Relations on scholarship at St Peter's College, Oxford before embarking on his diplomatic career. He served at postings in Asia, Europe, Africa, and North America.

He is the father of twin filmmakers Anthony Onah and Julius Onah, Roselynn Onah, Josephine Onah and Enya-Erine Onah. Enya-Erine is mother to his granddaughters, Lela-Biohu, Sorcha and Ixora.

== Career ==
Onah served as Nigerian ambassador to Equatorial Guinea and the Democratic People's Republic of Korea.

In 1993, Onah began a five-year posting to the United States, where he represented Nigeria during the Clinton Administration.
