= Evangelist Ebuka Obi =

Nigerian Catholic preacher

Ebuka Obi
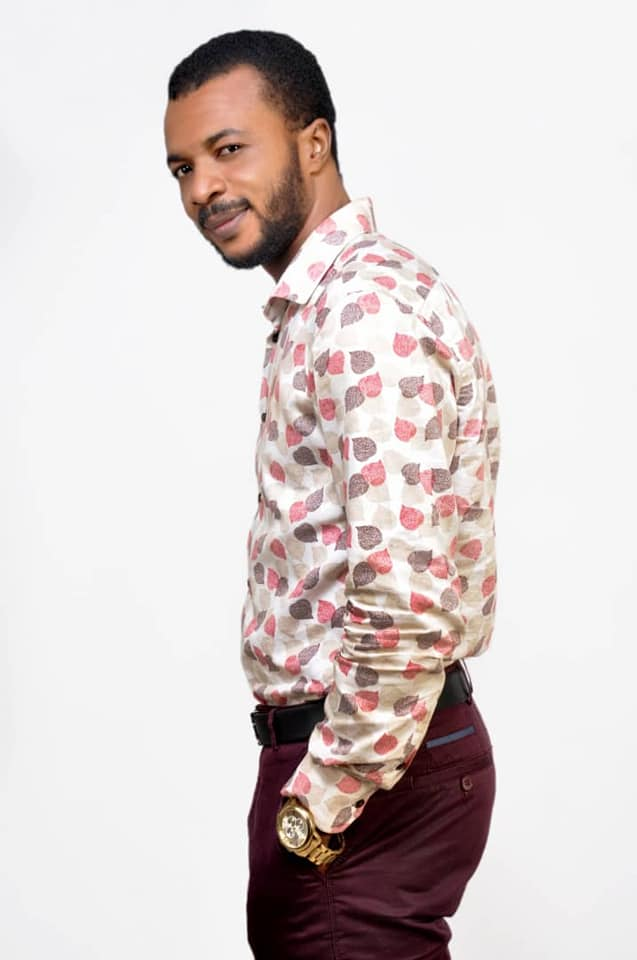
- Citizenship: Nigeria
- Occupation: Catholic preacher
- Website: https://zpmom.org

Chukwuebuka Anozie Obi, popularly known as Evangelist Ebuka Obi, is a Nigerian Catholic preacher and prophet. He is the founder and Spiritual Director of Zion Prayer Movement Outreach (ZPMO), a non-denominational Christian prayer ministry based in Ago-Okota, Lagos, Nigeria. His ministry is claimed to have grown to 170 branches worldwide. He is also the founder of Seraphic Home Foundation which caters for poor people and widows, and facilitates payment of school fees for indigent students.

== Early life and background ==
Obi was born as a twin to Mr. and Mrs. Vincent Obi in Ubulu-Ihejiofor, Oru West Local Government Area, Imo State, Nigeria. His mother reportedly had a revelation while she was pregnant that she would give birth to twins and that one of them had been chosen by God to serve him. At the age of 8, he started prophesying, and people came to his father's compound in search of him.

At age 12, Obi accompanied the Father Luke Odinkemere on exorcisms, with an ability to locate buried diabolical objects, which Odinkemere verified through digging. He also predicted the gender of unborn children. Odinkemere guided Obi to take a vow of celibacy at age 12. This vow included commitments to remain chaste until marriage, stay within the Catholic Church, and avoid being driven by materialism. As a result, Obi avoided interactions with women, including his sisters.

== Career ==
Obi was apprenticed to a cable business dealer in Lagos. Later his inclinations to prophecies and another ability to heal sicknesses distracted him from the cable business; so he left with a crowd of people seeking healing and following him to a prayer ground.

In 2009, Obi founded the Zion Prayer Movement Outreach in Lagos. Not intending it as a church, he refuses to collect tithes, perform baptisms, weddings, or bazaars. He also welcomes everyone of any religion to the prayer ground. It grew to 170 branches worldwide. Obi's prophesies, deliverance and miracles are a regular part of the liturgy of the ministry. On August 23, 2024, Obi hosted the first three-day World Conference of the ministry in south east Nigeria, at Amala/Ntu in Ngor-Okpala, Imo State.

Obi founded the Seraphic Home Foundation, which caters to the needs of orphans, widows and others in need. He also founded the Seraphic water company which provides water to the general public. His Seraphic Hospital provides free treatment to poor patients. He embarked on a campaign to stop the evil practice in Igbo land where people are forced to appear before deities and shrines in the name of settling disputes.

== Controversies ==
Obi has been accused of performing fake miracles to convince people to make donations to his ministry. In March 2025, a woman was arrested for giving fake testimony about the results of his prophecy. Obi distanced himself from her and said she had "lied to God". Another woman claimed on social media that his "malicious prophecy" had led to her being accused of witchcraft after he implied she was responsible for her daughter's illness.

The reported healing of Arinze Chinwuba of the Anambra State University in which he threw away the double crutches which aided him to walk and the testimony of a former member of the National Assembly (Nigeria), Uche Nwole endorsing the validity of Obi's miracles, oppose accusations that some miracles performed at Zion ministry may be faux.

A blogger was arrested by the Nigerian police for accusing Obi of fake miracles.

=== Other cases ===
Earlier in March 2024, another blogger reportedly made accusations against Obi. In March 2025, a woman gave a false testimony at Zion ministry about owning a 500 Million Naira house; upon discovering the testimony was false, Obi disassociated himself from the woman's claims. A similar case involving submission of charms was also unraveled. Three men were arrested by the Economic and Financial Crimes Commission (EFCC) for impersonating Obi on social media. An attempt was also made to assassinate Obi.
