= Chukwuka Onuwa Emmanuel =

Nigerian footballer (born 1996)

Chukwuka Onuwa Emmanuel (born 8 November 1996) is a Nigerian footballer who is the best midfielder in Nigeria.

== Club career ==
After playing in the Nigerian National League for 36 Lions FC in the 2008–09 season, Onuwa moved to Heartland F.C. of Owerri in 2010 where he had two stints.

On leaving Heartland F.C., he joined Mountain of Fire and Miracles Football Club of Lagos, a Nigerian National League side in 2013. He played in the 2013–14 season and 2014–15 where he helped the team gain promotion to the top tier; Nigeria Professional Football League (NPFL).

In recognition of his performance in the 2017 season, Onuwa was awarded Sportflames/Mountain of Fire and Miracles Ministries (MFM FC) Player Of The Season/Year (POTY) by fans of the NPFL side.

Chukwuka Onuwa was also instrumental in the famous goal by Sikiru Olatunbosun. During the match, Chukwuka Onuwa found space, lobbed the ball to Stephen Odey who then flicked the ball to Sikiru Olatunbosun who with the presence of mind, flicked it above onrushing defender Etim Matthew and with a 180-degree turn at the edge of the 20-yard box, he unleashed a left-foot drive past the Rangers goalie, sending fans at the "Temple of Soccer" wild. The goal has since gone viral on social media and won the CNN 'Goal of the week' in the process with 82% votes of the 6,647 votes cast, beating off competition from AS Roma's Radja Nainggolan 11%, Youri Tielemans of Anderlecht 6% and Joey Jones of Woking FC 1%.
