= Clifford Chukwuma =

Nigerian footballer and coach

Personal information
- Place of birth: Nigeria

Team information
- Current team: Kannur City FC (Head Coach)

Senior career*
Years	Team	Apps	(Gls)
- Afprint
- Eagle Cement

Managerial career
- Sporting Goa
- SESA FA
- Kannur City FC
- * Club domestic league appearances and goals

Clifford Chukwuma is a former Nigerian football player and is the current head coach of the SESA Football Academy in India.

Chukwuma's son, Chukwudi Chukwuma, currently plays for FK Teplice of the Czech First League.

== Coaching career ==
=== Sporting Goa ===
Chukwuma managed Sporting Goa in I-League from 2008 to 2009.

=== SESA FA ===
After leaving Sporting Goa, Chukwuma became the head coach at the SESA Football Academy.
