= Rose Onah =

Nigerian academic and local government administrator

- Born: Roseline C. Onah; Nigeria
- Occupations: Academic, public administrator
- Employer(s): University of Nigeria, Nsukka
- Known for: Public administration and local government studies
- Office: Chairman of Nsukka Local Government Area

Rose Onah is a Nigerian academic and public administrator. She is a professor in the Department of Public Administration and Local Government at the University of Nigeria, Nsukka. She has also served as the caretaker chairman of Nsukka Local Government Area in Enugu State, Nigeria.

== Academic career ==
Onah joined the University of Nigeria, Nsukka where she became a lecturer in the Department of Public Administration and Local Government. Over time, she became a professor. Her academic work focuses on governance, development policy, and public sector administration in Nigeria.

She has contributed to academic research and educational publications addressing governance challenges, public sector reforms, and policy implementation in Nigeria.

== Public service ==
She served as the caretaker chairman of Nsukka Local Government Area in Enugu State during the administration of Governor Ifeanyi Ugwuanyi. She was involved in local governance initiatives and public policy discussions affecting the region.

During her tenure, she advocated for policies that promote cultural heritage and education, including encouraging schools in southeastern Nigeria to introduce a designated day for speaking the Igbo language.

== Research and publications ==
Onah has written academic works on governance, public administration, and local government development in Nigeria.
