= Chuks Omalicha =

Nigerian film actor, entrepreneur, and producer

- Born: Chukwudi Paul Ossai; May 5, 1985 (age 41); Delta State, Nigeria
- Other name: Chuks Omalicha
- Education: Delta State University, University of Benin
- Occupations: Film actor, entrepreneur and producer
- Years active: 2010–present
- Known for: Rain drop, wild heart, what is love, etc
- Awards: 2015 City People Movie Awards

Chukwudi Paul Ossai commonly known as Chuks Omalicha (born May 5, 1985) is a Nigerian film actor, entrepreneur and producer. He is best known for his role as "Derick" in the 2011 movie, Rain Drop, alongside Ini Edo, John Dumelo and Artus Frank.

== Early life and education ==
Omalicha hails from Delta State, Nigeria. He attended Heritage Group of Schools, Benin City for his primary education, and the UNIBEN Demonstration Secondary School, for his secondary education. He began a diploma course in Science Laboratory at University of Benin and later obtained a Master of Art degree in Biomedical Science from the Delta State University.

== Career ==
He started his professional acting career in 2010. He however had his breakthrough in the Chiweuba Nneji movie titled "Rain Drop" where he played the role of Derick. He has featured in several Nollywood movies, including: Helped, Rule No 1, and Where my Heart Lies.

== Selected filmography ==
- Rain Drop (2011)
- Wild Heart (2013)
- Ibu and Akwa Ibom Girls (2014)
- Trinity (2015)
- What is Love (2017)
- A Fight to Live (2017)
- My American Pikin (2018)
- The Return of Kaira (2018)
- Ekeanyanwu (2018)
- Rule No 1 (2018)
- Wrong Choice (2019)
- My Billionaire Wife (2019)
- Web Locked (2021)
- Storms in Love (2021)
- Plot Twist (2021)
- Fake Love (2020)
- Helped (2020)
- The Pastor Pot of Life (2011)
- Yankee Hustle (2020)
- Teaser (2011)
- Mafia Love (2021)
- My Sissy Lover (2021)
- My Billionaire Wife (2019)
- Show Me Love (2020)
- Sham Love (2020)
- Before Getting Married (2020)
- Kaira My Lost Wife (2020)
- Out with Love (2020)
- InBetween Brothers (2019)
- Out with Love (2020)
- Another Man's Family Life (2018)
- Out with Love (2020)
- Truthful Lies (2021)
- Failing Love (2018)
- All Shade of You (2019)
- Beautiful Bride (2021)
- Shared Love (2019)
- Leap of Love (2019)
- Shared Love (2019)
- Marriage and Infidelity (2018)
- The Last Wish as a Wife (2020)
- Unique Kind of Love (2019)
- The Selfish Sisters (2019)
- Deeper Shade of us (2019)
- A Sunshile of Hope (2020)
- Devilish Agenda (2021)
- Friends and Betrayal (2021)
- Tragedy of Love (2021)
- Pain and Affection (2021)
- Wicked Souls (2021)
- The First Day we Met (2019)
- Where my Heart Lies (2021)

== Awards and recognition ==
In 2017, he was nominated for the Best Upcoming Actor of the Year (English) by City People Movie Award. He also won the 2015 City People Movie Award Most Promising Actor of the Year (English).
