= Emeka Eze =

Emeka Eze may refer to:

- Emeka Christian Eze (born 1992), Nigerian footballer who plays as a midfielder
- Emeka Friday Eze (born 1996), Nigerian footballer who plays as a striker
