= Anthony Emeka =

Nigerian footballer

Personal information
- Full name: Anthony Emeka Tochukwu
- Date of birth: 10 April 1990 (age 36)
- Place of birth: Abia, Nigeria
- Height: 1.89 m (6 ft 2 1/2 in)
- Positions: Defensive midfielder; central defender

Team information
- Current team: Chalkida

Youth career
- 2007–: JMJ academy

Senior career*
Years	Team	Apps	(Gls)
2012–2013	Koninklijke Beerschot Antwerpen Club	0	(0)
2013	VV Bocholter	10	(0)
2013–2014	Fostiras	27	(1)
2014–2016	Acharnaikos	45	(0)
2016–	Chalkida	0	(0)
- * Club domestic league appearances and goals as of 31 May 2016

Anthony emeka (born 10 April 1990) is a Nigerian football player who plays for Chalkida in Gamma Ethniki.
