= Nnaemeka Ikegwuonu =

Nigerian farming and energy entrepreneur (born 1981/82)

- Born: 1981 (age 44–45); Imo state
- Citizenship: Nigeria
- Education: Imo State University
- Occupations: Entrepreneur; Radio broadcaster
- Notable work: He founded the Smallholders Foundation, which informs on sustainable farming through a radio station; He is the CEO of ColdHubs
- Awards: Rolex Award, WISE Award, Yara Prize for Green Revolution in Africa

Nnaemeka Chidiebere Ikegwuonu (born 1981 or 1982) is a Nigerian entrepreneur and radio broadcaster. He founded the Smallholders Foundation, which informs on sustainable farming through a radio station, and is CEO of ColdHubs, which rents solar-powered cold storage to food producers.

== Early life and education ==
Ikegwuonu is from a farming family in Imo State, Nigeria. He earned a bachelor's degree in history and international studies from Imo State University and, in 2009, a master's degree in cooperation and development from the Institute for Advanced Studies at the University of Pavia, in Italy. He also holds certificates in subjects including water resources management, poverty and human rights, and environmental education from various European universities.

== Career ==
After finishing school, Ikegwuonu worked for an NGO dealing with HIV among farmers. In 2003, when he was 21, he founded the Smallholders Foundation, to provide information to farmers on sustainable practices; he later added an interactive radio show, with farmers using solar-powered handsets with a Wi-Fi connection to communicate with the broadcasters. By 2010, it had approximately 250,000 listeners a day.

In 2012, Ikegwuonu travelled to Dresden, where he met with scientists to discuss a cold storage system they had designed. After initial implementation in 2014 of food coolers based on their design at markets, in 2015, he launched ColdHubs, a company that rents solar-powered chilled storage space to farmers and fishers, reducing food waste and increasing their profits.

He has also designed a trolley that prolongs the shelf life of cassava. In 2018, he became a Biodiversity fellow of the Interdisciplinary Centre for Conservation Science at the University of Oxford, England.

== Awards ==
Ikegwuonu became an Ashoka fellow in 2008. He also received the Rolex Award in 2010, the WISE Award in 2010, and the Yara Prize for Green Revolution in Africa.
