= Emeka Jude Ezeonu =

Nigerian footballer

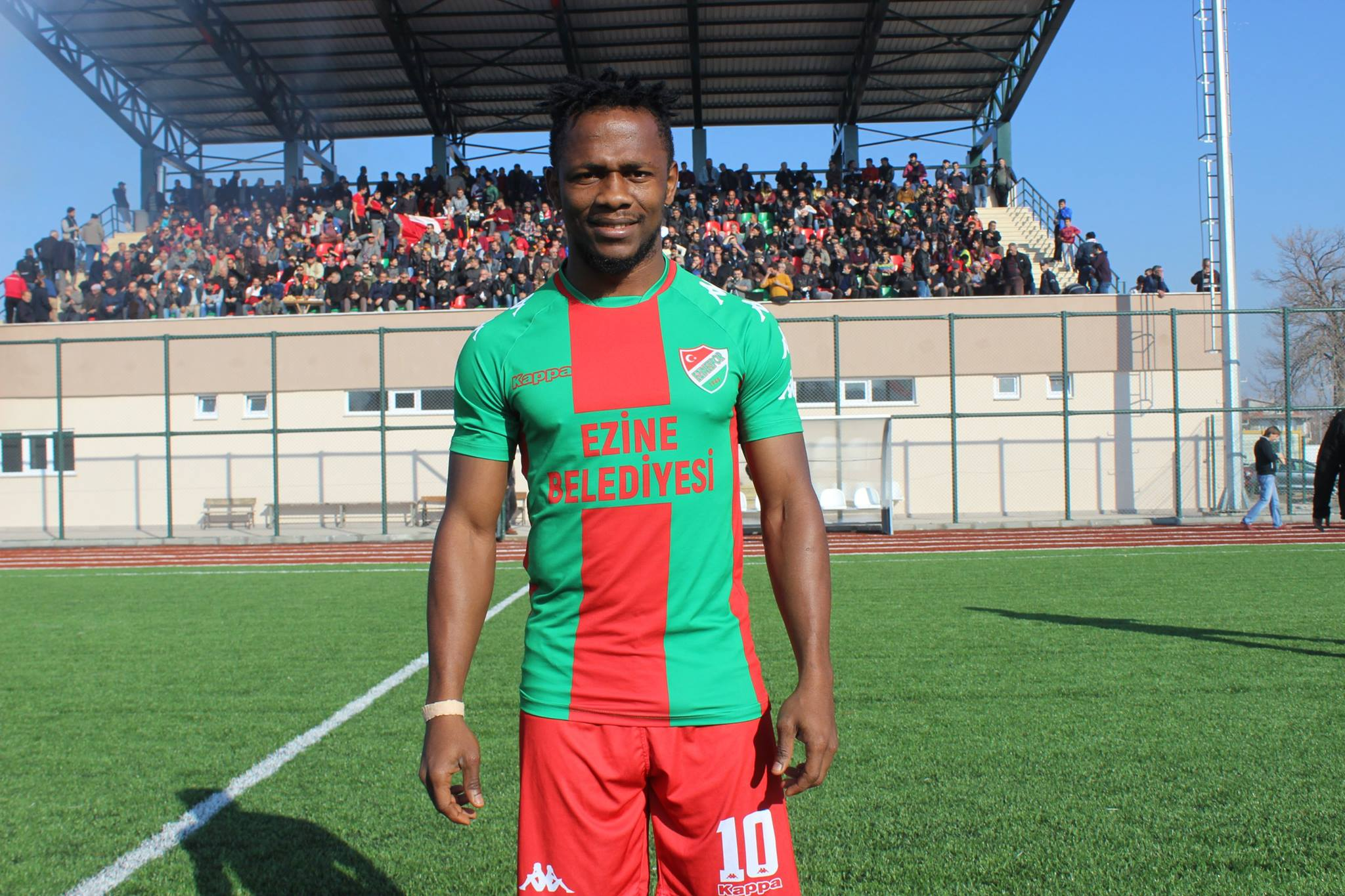

Personal information
- Date of birth: 13 September 1991 (age 35)
- Place of birth: Kano, Nigeria
- Height: 1.70 m (5 ft 7 in)
- Position: Striker

Senior career*
Years	Team	Apps	(Gls)
2009–2011	Ifeanyi Ubah F.C	2	(2)
2012–2013	SC Victoria University	2	(1)
2013–2014	Victors FC	9	(7)
2014–2015	Kilis Belediye Spor	2	(1)
2015–2016	Sakıcı İnşaatŞenyurtspor	9	(3)
2016–2017	Corluspor	10	(8)
2016–2017	Ezinespor	25	(3)
2017–2018	Aşağı Kirazcaspor	7	(3)
2018–2019	Batman Gercüş Bağlarspor	9	(7)
2018–2019	Vizespor	15	(7)
- * Club domestic league appearances and goals

Emeka Jude Ezeonu (born 13 September 1991) is a Nigerian footballer who plays as a striker.

== Life and career ==
Emeka Jude Ezeonu began his football career in Ifeanyi Ubah F.C. in Nigeria before he moved to Uganda where he signed with SCVU Victoria University in 2012. Following the conclusion of the 2013 season, Ezeonu was transferred to Victors FC, after the season he moved to Turkey and was signed by Kilis belediyespor where he made 2 appearances and scored a goal in is first game in the year 2014, he was loaned to Senyurtspor in the half season he made 9 appearances in 2015 before he was transferred to Çorluspor, after the year 2016 he was signed by Ezinespor where he made a great impact and was transferred to Asaği Kirazcaspor in 2017 the season he moved to Batman Gercüs Baglarspor in the half season, then transferred to Vizespor in 2018 where he helped the club gain promotion to the Turkish Bal league in 2019.

Ezeonu had a successful stint at Senyurtspor from 2015–16. At the end of the season, he joined Corluspor.

Ezeonu joined at Ezinespor from 2016–17 season, he played 25 matches and 3 goals, 15 assists.
