= Chukwuebuka Ezugha =

Nigerian freestyle footballer

Chukwuebuka Ezugha is a Nigerian freestyle footballer.

== Career ==
Ezugha established the "Chukwuebuka Freestyle Entertainment & Chukwuebuka Academy". In January 2019, Ezugha set up the "Chukwuebuka School Freestyle Football Training Program" for Nigerian children, where he aims to balance academic excellence with sporting prowess. The annual Chukwuebuka School Competition rewards outstanding male and female students with cash prizes as well as offering year-long academic scholarships.

Ezugha has been involved in 18 Guinness World Records. In November 2023, Ezugha set the World Record for completing the most contortion arm passes in 30 seconds, whilst simultaneously balancing a football on his head.

On 30 December 2023, he set the World Record for the most touches of a football with his abdomen completing 152 touches in one minute.
