= Emeka Jude Ugali =

Nigerian footballer

Personal information
- Full name: Emeka Jude Ugali
- Date of birth: 28 May 1982 (age 44)
- Place of birth: Imgidi, Nigeria
- Height: 1.82 m (6 ft 0 in)
- Position: Striker

Youth career
- 1997: Princess Jegede
- 1998–1999: FK Beograd
- 1999: Polonia Warsaw

Senior career*
| Years | Team | Apps | (Gls) |
| 2000 | Venezia | 0 | (0) |
| 2000–2004 | Monza | 40 | (4) |
| 2004–2005 | Adrano | 6 | (2) |
| 2005–2006 | Montenero | 9 | (0) |
| 2006–2007 | Seregno | 13 | (1) |
| 2007–2008 | A.S.D. Mesagne | ? | (?) |
| 2008–2009 | Villafranca di Verona | ? | (?) |
| 2009–2011 | Derthona | 39 | (3) |
| 2011–2013 | A.S.D. Verdello Intercomunale | ? | (?) |
| 2013 | Olimpia Ponte Tresa | ? | (?) |
| 2014–2016 | Pro Vigevano | ? | (?) |
| 2016–2018 | Bombonasca | ? | (?) |

International career
| 2002 | Nigeria | 2 | (0) |
- * Club domestic league appearances and goals as of 25 August 2011

Emeka Jude Ugali (born 28 May 1982) is a retired Nigerian football striker.

== Career ==
=== Club ===
Withdrawn from Nigeria just sixteen where he played with Princess Jegede, he began his career in Serbian second-level side FK Beograd in season 1998–99.Next summer, he moved to Poland where he joined Ekstraklasa side Polonia Warsaw. During winter-break, he moved to Italy where he joined F.B.C. Unione Venezia, the team of Venice. From 2000 to 2004 plays in A.C. Monza Brianza 1912, where he lived the peak of his career. In the 2003-2004 Season, The Website Monza News index a poll for fans to vote for the best player of the season. Ugali withdraws the award ARREDOKIT TROPHY 2003–04. In later years he played with several smaller teams, both amateur and Serie D.

=== International career ===
Ugali plays for the Nigerian national team, having collect 2 caps all in 2002. His debut arrive at 4 May 2002 in Lagos against Kenya in a friendly match, ended 3-0 for the Nigerians. The second and last appearance was at 18 May 2002 in London at Loftus Road against Jamaica always in a friendly match, ended 0-0.

== Disputes ==
On 23 September 2001, during the match of Serie C1: A.C. Monza Brianza 1912-Pisa Calcio (1-2), Ugali was ejected by the referee Latella from Potenza because the Nigerian player dropped his shorts after a Pisa player had called him "nigger". The President of Calcio Monza, Cesare D'Evant, said after the match that while condemning the incident of racism, that it did not justify the reaction of his player.

Ugali behaved in a very unfair towards the opponent and deserved expulsion. But I wanted to express to the match our deep regret at the serious racist insults clear that our player has suffered since his entry into the field.
