= Emeka Oguzie =

Nigerian chemist and researcher

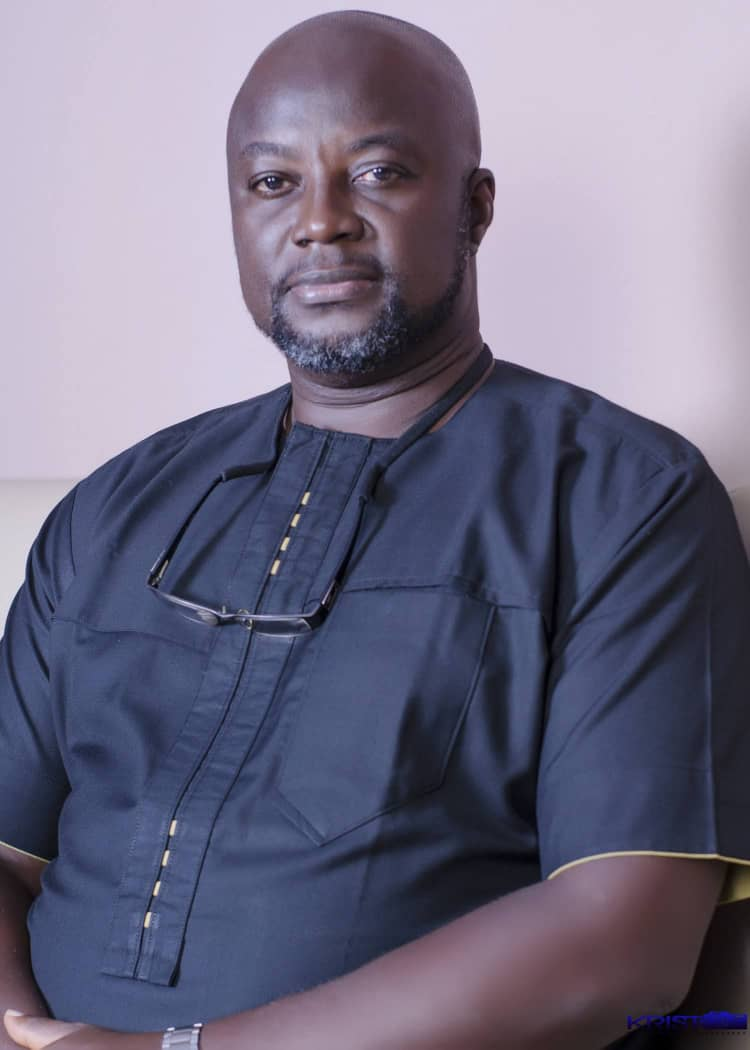
- Professor Emeka Oguzie

Deputy Vice Chancellor, Federal University of Technology, Owerri
- Incumbent
- Assumed office 2021

Personal details
- Born: October 7, 1972 (age 54) Enugu, Enugu State
- Spouse: Dr. Kanayo L. Oguzie
- Children: Chiagozie Oguzie, Chizaram Oguzie
- Education: University of Nigeria, Nsukka

Emeka Emmanuel Oguzie // is a Nigerian chemist and researcher. He is the Deputy Vice Chancellor of Federal University of Technology, Owerri.

He is the Center Leader of the Africa Center of Excellence in Future Energies & Electrochemical Systems (ACE-FUELS). Oguzie is also a member of the Chemical Society of Nigeria (CSN).

== Early life and education ==
After obtaining a Bachelor of Science degree in Pure Chemistry from the University of Nigeria Nsukka in 1996, he proceeded to the Federal University of Technology Owerri where he acquired a master's degree in Analytical Chemistry, in 1998. Oguzie received his Ph.D. in Physical Chemistry from the University of Calabar in 2006.

== Career ==
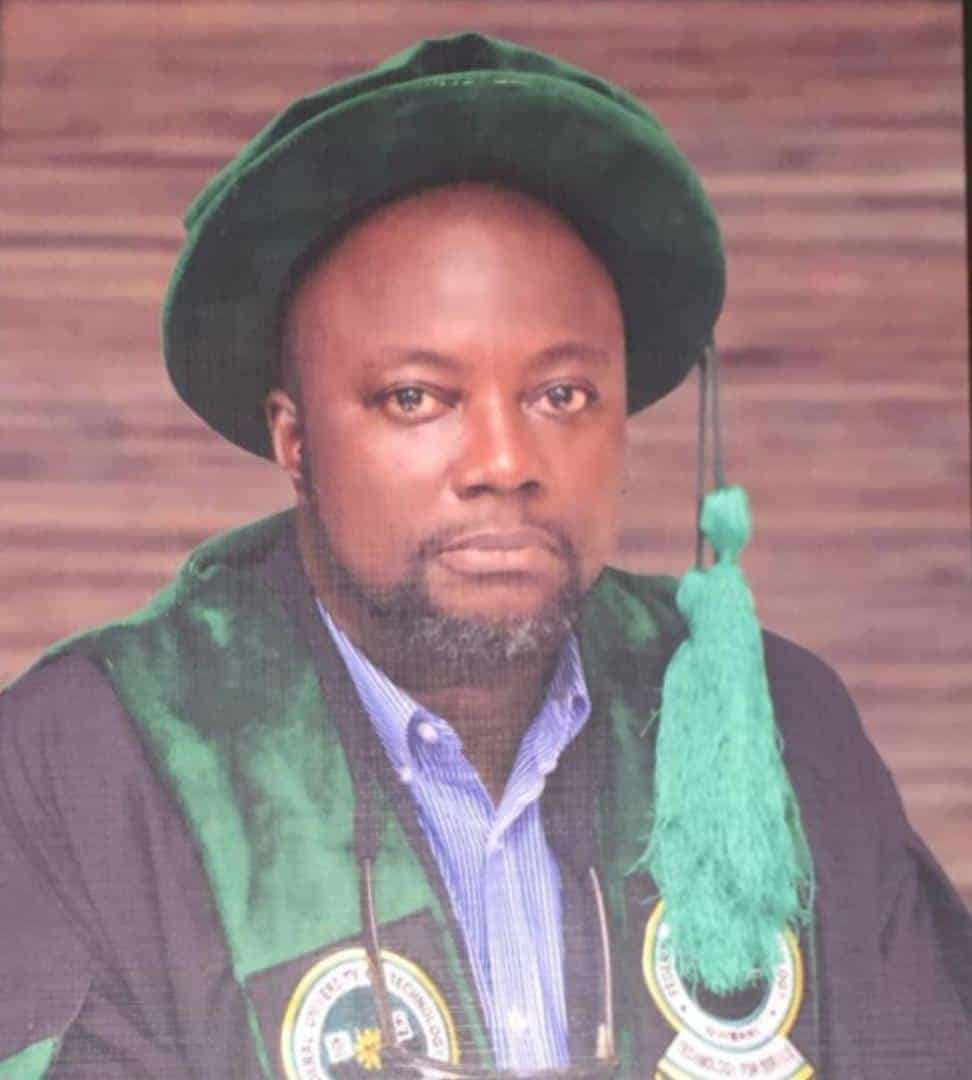
Professor Emeka Oguzie as Deputy Vice Chancellor (Research, Development & Innovation)

Oguzie is a Professor of Physical Chemistry at the Federal University of Technology Owerri (FUTO). He was a visiting (CAS-TWAS) postdoctoral research fellow (2006–2007), and TWAS-UNESCO Associate (2008–2011) at the State Key Laboratory for Corrosion and Protection, Institute of Metal Research, Chinese Academy of Sciences, Shenyang, China. He was appointed Young Affiliate of The World Academy of Science (2007-2012). Oguzie is a fellow of the OPEC Fund for International Development (OFID).

Oguzie began his lecturing career in 1999, in the department of Chemistry, at Federal University of Technology Owerri. He has held several administrative positions including:

- Associate Dean, School of Science, FUTO (2008–2012)
- Member, University Senate, FUTO (2008–present)
- Head, Department of Technology, FUTO (2013–2015)
- Director, Center for Research & International Development, FUTO (2015–2017)
- Dean, School of Environmental Sciences, FUTO (2017–2019)

In 2019, Oguzie became the Center Leader of the Africa Center of Excellence in Future Energies & Electrochemical Systems (ACE-FUELS) in FUTO. He also has experience working in the Petrochemical industry, having been engaged as Research Advisor (Health, Safety & Environment) at Shell Petroleum Development Company, Port Harcourt, Nigeria (2012-2013).

Oguzie was in 2021 appointed the Deputy Vice-Chancellor (Research, Development and Innovation) at Federal University of Technology Owerri.

== Honors and awards ==
- China Academy of Sciences - The Academy of Sciences for the Developing World (CAS-TWAS) Postdoctoral Fellowship (2006-2007)
- TWAS Young Affiliate (2007-2012)
- TWAS-UNESCO Associate (2008-2011)
- OPEC Fund for International Development; OFID International Fellowship (2009)
- CAS President's International Fellowship (2013-2015)

== Professional memberships ==
- Affiliate Alumni, the Academy of Sciences for the Developing World (TWAS)
