= Anthony Onah =

American film director

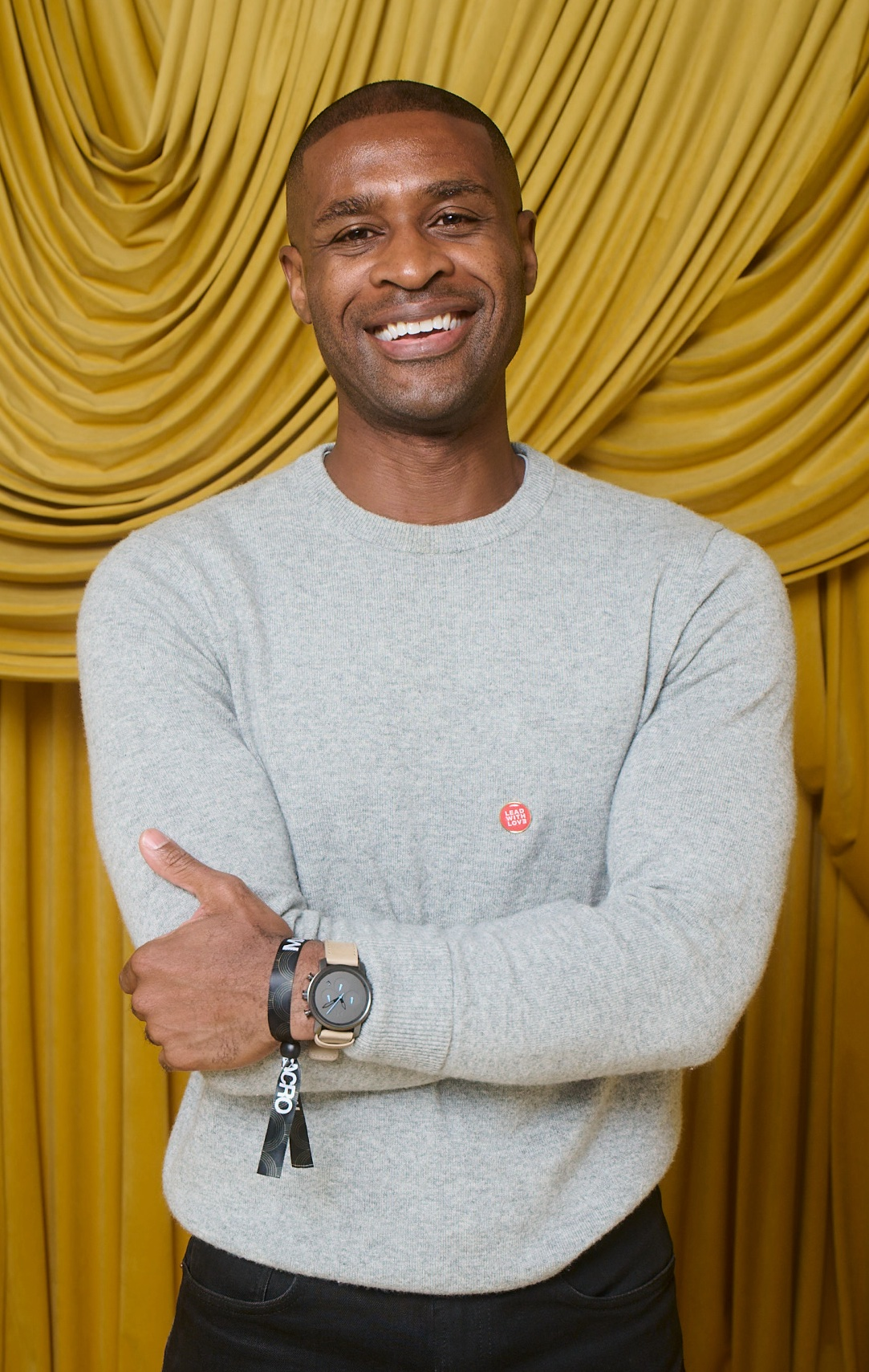
- Onah in 2024
- Education: Harvard University (BA); University of California, Los Angeles (MFA)
- Occupations: film director, screenwriter, producer

Anthony Onah is a Nigerian-American film director, screenwriter, and producer. He is best known for his debut feature, The Price (2017), which premiered in competition at the 2017 South by Southwest Film Festival.

== Early life and education ==
Onah was born in Benue State, Nigeria. He grew up moving around with his ambassador father, Adoga Onah. After having lived in the Philippines, United Kingdom, Nigeria, and Togo, his family settled in Arlington, VA and Washington, D.C.

Onah studied as an undergraduate at Harvard University, graduating with honors in biochemical sciences and writing a thesis titled A Neural Switch Controlling Phototactic Behavior in Drosophila. He received the Pechet Foundation grant given to biochemistry majors and the Thomas T. Hoopes Prize for outstanding scholarly work.

Accepted at Cambridge University for graduate school in genetics, Onah turned down admission, instead working as a scientist during which time he was published in The Journal of Neuroscience, and subsequently chose to attend the MFA program in film directing at the University of California, Los Angeles, where he was admitted with a university fellowship.

== Career ==
=== Short films ===
In grad school at UCLA, Onah wrote and directed the short film The Cure, which was recognized by mtvU, won a 2008 Directors Guild of America Award, and was featured in The Los Angeles Times. Onah was subsequently named to Indiewire's list of 10 Exciting New Voices. He was also awarded the Hollywood Foreign Press Award and the Edie and Lew Wasserman Fellowship. His next film True Colors world premiered at the 2011 Woodstock Film Festival. Onah then completed A History of Violence with renowned cognitive psychologist Steven Pinker and Dara Ju, which won him a second student Directors Guild of America Award in 2012. In 2012, he was also invited as a directing talent to the Berlin Talent Campus. With Dara Ju, Onah went on to win the first Afrinolly Short Film Competition, Africa's most prestigious Short Film Competition awarding a $25,000 cash prize.

After graduating film school, he was named to Filmmaker Magazine's list of 25 New Faces of Independent Film.

Onah's screenplay Goliath was one of 12 projects selected for the 2019 Sundance Screenwriters Lab.

=== Feature films ===
==== The Price ====
Onah made his feature debut with The Price, which he wrote and directed. An expansion of his film school short Dara Ju, the feature was developed with the support of the Sundance Institute, IFP, Ford Foundation, and Film Independent.

The Price (2017) premiered in the Narrative Feature Competition at the 2017 South by Southwest Film Festival. Orion Pictures and Samuel Goldwyn Films acquired the film for theatrical distribution shortly thereafter.

The film played numerous festivals including the 2017 Seattle International Film Festival, where is nominated for the FIPRESCI Prize in the New American Cinema Competition. Onah also won the Craig Brewer Emerging Filmmaker Award for the film at the 2017 Indie Memphis Film Festival. Upon its theatrical release, Variety magazine wrote that The Price is "a thoughtfully crafted, elegant-looking indie drama that suggests a bright future for Onah" and "a first feature so assured on nearly all levels."

==== Goliath ====
Onah is in active development on the dramatic thriller Goliath, which was invited to the Sundance Screenwriters Lab. The screenplay received a Sloan Foundation fellowship.

== Filmography ==
=== Short films ===
Year	Title	Director	Writer	Producer	Editor
2008	Keepers	Yes	Yes	Yes	Yes
2008	The Cure	Yes	Yes	Yes	Yes
2010	Gimme Grace	Yes	Yes	Yes	No
2011	True Colors	Yes	Yes	Yes	Yes
2012	Dara Ju	Yes	Yes	Yes	No

=== Feature films ===
Year	Title	Director	Writer	Producer
2017	The Price	Yes	Yes	Yes
TBA	Goliath	Yes	Yes	Yes

== Accolades ==
Awards
Award	Date of ceremony	Category	Recipients and nominees	Result
Directors Guild of America Awards	November 8, 2012	Student Film Award	Anthony Onah	Won
South by Southwest Film Festival	March 14, 2017	Grand Jury Prize	The Price	Nominated
Seattle International Film Festival	June 11, 2017	FIPRESCI Prize in the New American Cinema Competition	The Price	Nominated
Indie Memphis Film Festival	November 5, 2017	Craig Brewer Emerging Filmmaker Award	Anthony Onah	Won
