= Jewish views on marriage =

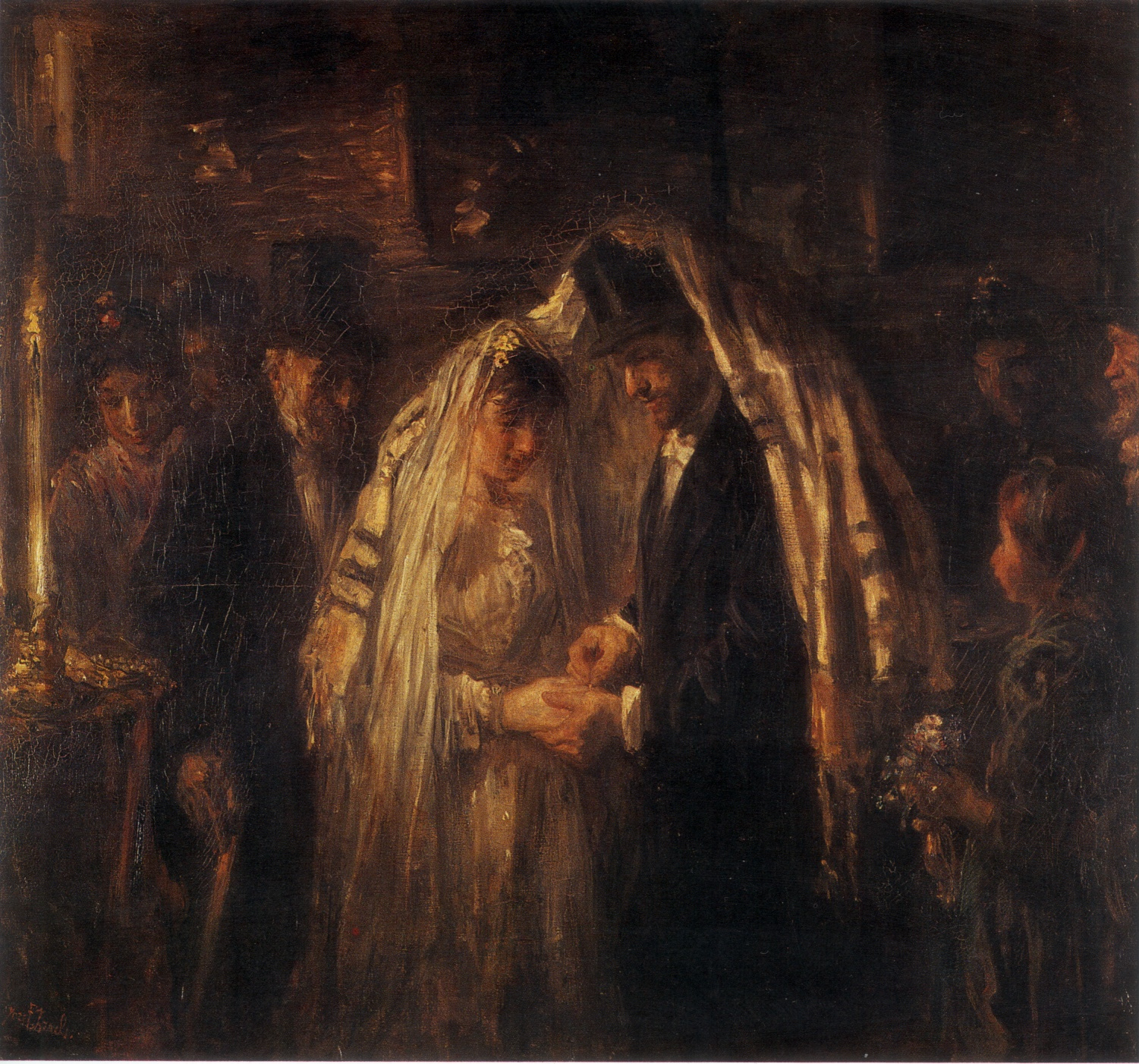
A Jewish wedding (1903) by Jozef Israëls

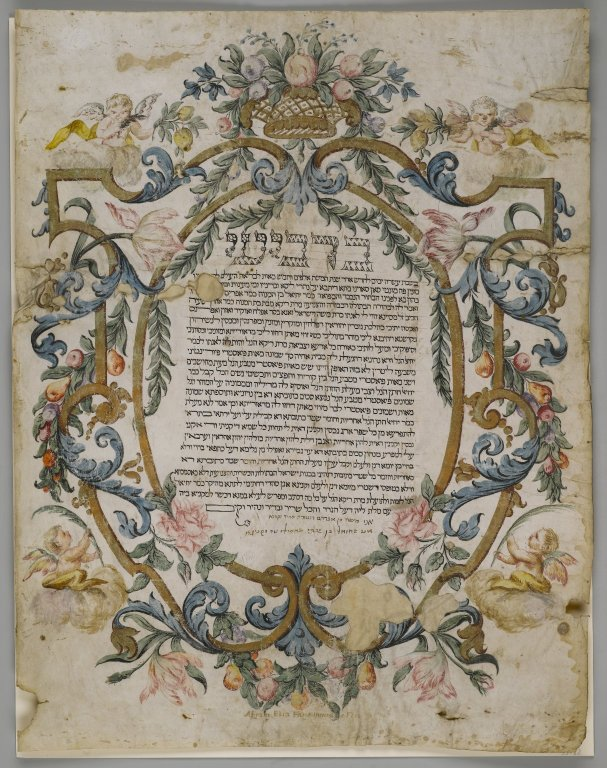
Jewish marriage certificate, dated 1740 (Brooklyn Museum)

Under Jewish law, marriage is essentially a private contractual agreement between a man and a woman and does not require the presence of a rabbi or any other religious official. It is common, however, for rabbis to officiate and there are rules governing the process of betrothal and consecration.

Non-Orthodox developments have brought changes in who may marry whom. Intermarriage is often discouraged, though opinions vary.

In Judaism, a marriage can end either because of a divorce document given by the man to his wife, or by the death of either party. Certain details, primarily as protections for the wife, were added in Talmudic times.

== Overview ==
=== Historic view ===
In traditional Judaism, marriage is viewed as a contractual bond commanded by God in which a Jewish man and a Jewish woman come together to create a relationship in which God is directly involved. Though procreation is not the sole purpose, a Jewish marriage is traditionally expected to fulfil the commandment to have children. In this view, marriage is understood to mean that the husband and wife are merging into a single soul, which is why a man is considered "incomplete" if he is not married, as his soul is only one part of a larger whole that remains to be unified.

=== Recent non-Orthodox views ===
Non-Orthodox Jewish denominations, such as Reconstructionist, Reform, and Conservative Judaism, recognize same-sex marriage, and de-emphasize procreation, focusing on marriage as a bond between a couple.

== Betrothal and marriage ==
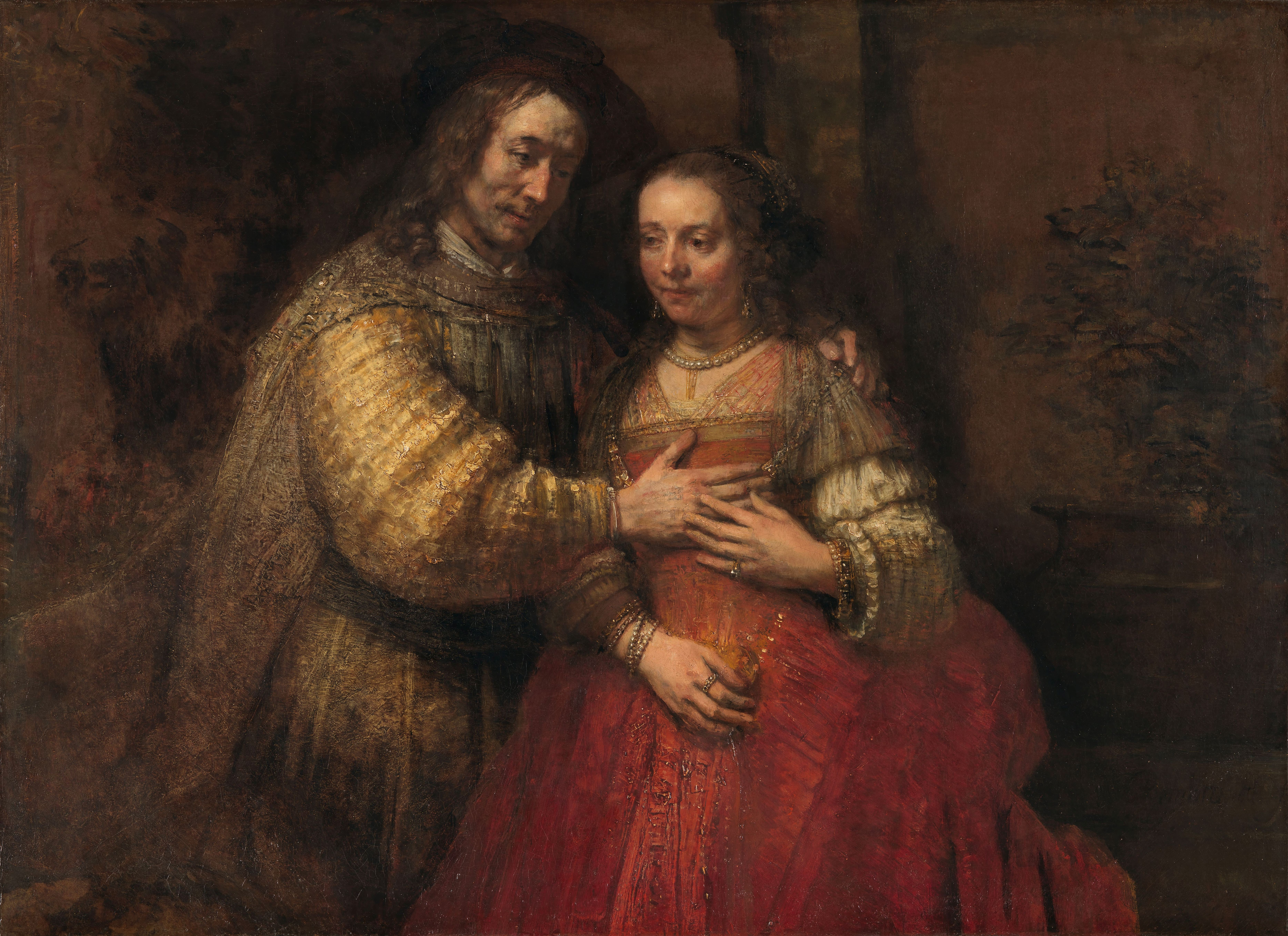
The Jewish Bride (Rembrandt, 1662–6)

In Jewish law, marriage consists of two separate acts, called erusin or kiddushin, (Note: Sometimes the word kiddushin may be used to refer to marriage as a whole, and not just the betrothal.) which is the betrothal ceremony, and nissu'in or chupah, the actual Jewish wedding ceremony. Erusin changes the couple's personal circumstances, while nissu'in brings about the legal consequences of the change of circumstances. In Talmudic times, these two ceremonies usually took place up to a year apart; the bride lived with her parents until the actual marriage ceremony (nissuin), which would take place in a room or tent that the groom had set up for her. Since the Middle Ages the two ceremonies have taken place as a combined ceremony performed in public.

In Ancient Judaism a marriage could be established in three ways: money, contract, or sexual intercourse.

According to the Talmud, erusin involves the groom handing an object to the bride – either an object of value such as a ring, or a document stating that she is being betrothed to him. In order to be valid, this must be done in the presence of two unrelated male witnesses. After erusin, the laws of adultery apply, and the marriage cannot be dissolved without a religious divorce. After nisuin, the couple may live together.

The act of erusin may be made by the intending parties or by their respective parents or other relatives on their behalf with their consent. A man and a woman cannot be betrothed to one another without agency and consent. The act is formalized in a document known as the Shtar Tena'im, the "Document of Conditions" which is read prior to the badekin. After the reading, the mothers of the future bride and groom break a plate. Today, some sign the contract on the day of the wedding, some do it as an earlier ceremony, and some do not do it at all. It should also be emphasized that this practice is not explicitly mentioned in the Hebrew Bible.

In Haredi communities, marriages may be arranged by the parents of the prospective bride and groom, who may arrange a shidduch by engaging a professional match-maker (shadchan) who finds and introduces the prospective bride and groom and receives a fee for their services. The young couple is not forced to marry if either does not accept the other.

== Matrimony ==
=== Marital harmony ===
Marital harmony, known as shalom bayis (שלום בית), is valued in Jewish tradition. The Talmud states that a man should love his wife as much as he loves himself, and honour her more than he honours himself; indeed, one who honours his wife was said, by the classical rabbis, to be rewarded with wealth. Similarly, a husband was expected to discuss with his wife any worldly matters that might arise in his life. The Talmud forbids a husband from being overbearing to his household, and domestic abuse by him was also condemned. It was said of a wife that "God counts her tears".

As for the wife, the greatest praise the Talmudic rabbis offered to any woman was that given to a wife who fulfils the wishes of her husband; to this end, an early midrash states that a wife should not leave the home "too frequently". A wife, also, was expected to be modest, even when alone with her husband. God's presence dwells in a pure and loving home.

=== Conjugal rights and obligations ===
Marriage obligations and rights in Judaism are ultimately based on those apparent in the Bible, which have been clarified, defined, and expanded on by many prominent rabbinic authorities throughout history.

Traditionally, the obligations of the husband include providing for his wife. He is obligated to provide for her sustenance for her benefit; in exchange, he is also entitled to her income. However, this is a right to the wife, and she can release her husband of the obligation of sustaining her, and she can then keep her income exclusively for herself. The document that provides for this is the ketubah.

The Bible itself gives the wife protections, as per Exodus 21:10, although the rabbis may have added others later. The rights of the husband and wife are described in tractate Ketubot in the Talmud, which explains how the rabbis balanced the two sets of rights of the wife and the husband.

According to the non-traditional view, in the Bible the wife is treated as a possession owned by her husband, but later Judaism imposed several obligations on the husband, effectively giving the wife several rights and freedoms; indeed, being a Jewish wife was often a more favourable situation than being a wife in many other cultures. For example, the Talmud establishes the principle that a wife is entitled, but not compelled, to the same dignity and social standing as her husband, and is entitled to keep any additional advantages she had as a result of her social status before her marriage.

==== In the Bible ====
Biblical Hebrew has two words for "husband": ba'al (also meaning "master"), and ish (also meaning "man", parallel to isha meaning "woman" or "wife"). The words are contrasted in Hosea 2:16, where God speaks to Israel as though it is his wife: "On that day, says the Lord, you will call [me] 'my husband' (ish), and will no longer call me 'my master' (ba'al)."

Early nomadic communities practised a form of marriage known as beena, in which a wife would own a tent of her own, within which she retains complete independence from her husband; this principle appears to survive in parts of early Israelite society, as some early passages of the Bible appear to portray certain wives as each owning a tent as a personal possession (specifically, Jael, Sarah, and Jacob's wives). In later times, the Bible describes wives as being given the innermost room(s) of the husband's house, as her own private area to which men were not permitted; in the case of wealthy husbands, the Bible describes their wives as having each been given an entire house for this purpose.

It was not, however, a life of complete freedom. The descriptions of the Bible suggest that a wife was expected to perform certain household tasks: spinning, sewing, weaving, manufacture of clothing, fetching of water, baking of bread, and animal husbandry. The Book of Proverbs contains an entire acrostic about the duties which would be performed by a virtuous wife.

The husband, too, is indirectly implied to have responsibilities to his wife. The Torah obligates a man to not deprive his wife of food, clothing, or of sexual activity (onah); if the husband does not provide the first wife with these things, she is to be divorced, without cost to her. The Talmud interprets this as a requirement for a man to provide food and clothing to, and have sex with, each of his wives, even if he only has one.

As a polygynous society, the Israelites did not have any laws which imposed monogamy on men. Adulterous married and betrothed women, as well as their male accomplices, were subject to the death penalty by the biblical laws against adultery. According to the Book of Numbers, if a woman was suspected of adultery, she was to be subjected to the ordeal of the bitter water, a form of trial by ordeal, but one that took a miracle to convict. The literary prophets indicate that adultery was a frequent occurrence, despite their strong protests against it, and these legal strictnesses.

==== In the Talmud and Rabbinic Judaism ====
The Talmud sets a minimum provision which a husband must provide to his wife:

- Enough bread for at least two meals a day
- Sufficient oil for cooking and for lighting purposes
- Sufficient wood for cooking
- Fruit and vegetables
- Wine, if it is customary in the locality for women to drink it
- Three meals on each shabbat consisting of fish and meat
- An allowance of a silver coin (Hebrew: ma'ah) each week

Rabbinic courts could compel the husband to make this provision, if he fails to do so voluntarily. The Chatam Sofer, a prominent 19th century halachic decisor, argued that if a man could not provide his wife with this minimum, he should be compelled to divorce her; other Jewish rabbis argued that a man should be compelled to hire himself out, as a day-labourer, if he cannot otherwise make this provision to his wife.

According to prominent Jewish writers of the Middle Ages, if a man is absent from his wife for a long period, the wife should be allowed to sell her husband's property, if necessary to sustain herself. Similarly, they argued that if a wife had to take out a loan to pay for her sustenance during such absence, her husband had to pay the debt on his return.

In order to offset the husband's duty to support his wife, she was required by the Talmud to surrender all her earnings to her husband, together with any profit she makes by accident, and the right of usufruct on her property; the wife was not required to do this if she wished to support herself. Although the wife always retained ownership of her property itself, if she died while still married to her husband, he was to be her heir, according to the opinion of the Talmud; this principle, though, was modified, in various ways, by the rabbis of the Middle Ages.

===== Home and household =====
In Jewish tradition, the husband was expected to provide a home for his wife, furnished in accordance to local custom and appropriate to his status; the marital couple were expected to live together in this home, although if the husband's choice of work made it difficult to do so, the Talmud excuses him from the obligation. Traditionally, if the husband changed his usual abode, the wife was considered to have a duty to move with him. In the Middle Ages, it was argued that if a person continued to refuse to live with their spouse, the spouse in question had sufficient grounds for divorce.

Most Jewish religious authorities held that a husband must allow his wife to eat at the same table as him, even if he gave his wife enough money to provide for herself. By contrast, if a husband mistreated his wife, or lived in a disreputable neighbourhood, the Jewish religious authorities would permit the wife to move to another home elsewhere, and would compel the husband to finance her life there.

Expanding on the household tasks which the Bible implies a wife should undertake, rabbinic literature requires her to perform all the housework (such as baking, cooking, washing, caring for her children, etc.), unless her marriage had given the husband a large dowry; in the latter situation, the wife was expected only to tend to "affectionate" tasks, such as making his bed and serving him his food. Jewish tradition expected the husband to provide the bed linen and kitchen utensils. If the wife had young twin children, the Talmud made her husband responsible for caring for one of them.

===== Clothing =====
The Talmud elaborates on the biblical requirement of the husband to provide his wife with clothing, by insisting that each year he must provide each wife with 50 zuzim's-worth of clothing, including garments appropriate to each season of the year. The Talmudic rabbis insist that this annual clothing gift should include one hat, one belt, and three pairs of shoes (one pair for each of the three main annual festivals: Passover, Shabu'ot, and Sukkoth). The husband was also expected by the classical rabbis to provide his wife with jewelry and perfumes if he lived in an area where this was customary.

===== Physical obligations =====
The Talmud argues that a husband is responsible for the protection of his wife's body. If his wife became ill, then he would be compelled, by the Talmud, to defray any medical expense which might be incurred in relation to this; the Talmud requires him to ensure that the wife receives care. Although he technically had the right to divorce his wife, enabling him to avoid paying for her medical costs, several prominent rabbis throughout history condemned such a course of action as inhuman behaviour, even if the wife was suffering from a prolonged illness.

If the wife dies, even if not due to illness, the Talmud's stipulations require the husband to arrange, and pay for, her burial; the burial must, in the opinion of the Talmud, be one conducted in a manner befitting the husband's social status, and in accordance with the local custom. Prominent rabbis of the Middle Ages clarified this, stating that the husband must make any provisions required by local burial customs, potentially including the hiring of mourners and the erection of a tombstone. According to the Talmud, and later rabbinic writers, if the husband was absent, or refused to do these things, a rabbinical court should arrange the wife's funeral, selling some of the husband's property in order to defray the costs.

If the wife was captured, the husband was required by the Talmud and later writers to pay the ransom demanded for her release; there is some debate whether the husband was required only to pay up to the wife's market value as a slave, or whether he must pay any ransom, even to the point of having to sell his possessions to raise the funds. If the husband and wife were both taken captive, the historic Jewish view was that the rabbinic courts should first pay the ransom for the wife, selling some of the husband's property in order to raise the funds.

===== Fidelity =====
In the classical era of the rabbinic scholars, the death penalty for adultery was rarely applied. It forbids conviction if:

- the woman had been raped, rather than consenting to the crime;
- the woman had mistaken the paramour for her husband;
- the woman was unaware of the laws against adultery before she committed the crime;
- the woman had not been properly warned. This requires that the two witnesses testifying against her warn her that the Torah prohibits adultery; that the penalty for adultery is death; and that she immediately responded that she is doing so with full knowledge of those facts. Even if she was warned, but did not acknowledge those facts immediately upon hearing them, and immediately before doing the act, she is not put to death. These conditions apply in all death-penalty convictions.

These rules made it practically impossible to convict any woman of adultery; in nearly every case, women were acquitted. However, due to the belief that a priest should be untainted, a Kohen was compelled to divorce his wife if she had been raped.

In Talmudic times, once the death penalty was no longer enforced for any crime, even when a woman was convicted, the punishment was comparatively mild: adulteresses were flogged instead. Nevertheless, the husbands of convicted adulteresses were not permitted by the Talmud to forgive their guilty wives, instead being compelled to divorce them; according to Maimonides, a conviction for adultery nullified any right that the wife's marriage contract (Hebrew: ketubah) gave her to a compensation payment for being divorced. Once divorced, an adulteress was not permitted, according to the Talmudic writers, to marry her paramour.

As for men who committed adultery (with another man's wife), Abba ben Joseph and Abba Arika are both quoted in the Talmud as expressing abhorrence, and arguing that such men would be condemned to Gehenna.

===== Family purity =====
The laws of "family purity" (taharat hamishpacha) are considered an important part of an Orthodox Jewish marriage, and adherence to them is (in Orthodox Judaism) regarded as a prerequisite of marriage. This involves observance of the various details of the menstrual niddah laws. Orthodox brides and grooms attend classes on this subject prior to the wedding. The niddah laws are regarded as an intrinsic part of marital life (rather than just associated with women). Together with a few other rules, including those about the ejaculation of semen, these are collectively termed "family purity".

===== Sexual relations =====
In marriage, conjugal relations are guaranteed as a fundamental right for a woman, along with food and clothing. This obligation is known as onah. Sex within marriage is the woman's right, and the man's duty. The husband is forbidden from raping his wife, they are not to be intimate while drunk or while either party is angry at the other. A woman should be granted a get (divorce) if she seeks it because her husband is disgusting or loathsome to her. If either partner consistently refuses to participate, that person is considered rebellious, and the other spouse can sue for divorce. A very large number of Jewish texts attempting to regulate marital sexuality exist. This category can vary: it can mean a few biblical verse, chapters in medieval books of law, or self-standing modern traditional Jewish guides to marital sexuality. One should always remember that the fact a certain activity is recommended or forbidden, does not mean that in reality the advice is followed. We can know what generally traditional Jews were told to do or not to do in their bedrooms. We can very rarely know what actually happened.

== Age of marriage ==
Citing the primacy of the divine command given in Genesis 1:28, the time between puberty and age twenty has been considered the ideal time for men and women to be wed in traditional Jewish thought. Some rabbis have gone further to commend the age of eighteen as most ideal, while others have advocated for the time immediately following puberty, closer to the age of fourteen, essentially "as early in life as possible." Babylonian rabbis understood marriage as God's means of keeping male sexuality from going out of control, so they advocated for early marriage to prevent men from succumbing to temptation in their youth. The ḳeṭannah (children aged three to twelve) might be given in marriage by her father, and the marriage was valid, necessitating a formal divorce if separation was desired. Some commended early marriage for its benefits: Rabbi Ḥisda maintained that early marriage could lead to increased intelligence.

A large age gap between spouses, in either direction, is advised against as unwise. A younger woman marrying a significantly older man however is especially problematic: marrying one's young daughter to an old man was declared as reprehensible as forcing her into prostitution. Moreover, it is problematic for an older man to be unmarried in the first place. Marriage is held to be uniquely mandatory for men, and an unmarried man over the age of twenty is considered "cursed by God Himself."

There is evidence however that in some communities males did not marry until "thirty or older." In medieval Jewish Ashkenazi communities, women continued to be married young. Since the Enlightenment, young marriage has become rarer among Jewish communities.

=== Consent ===
According to the Talmud, a father is commanded not to marry his daughter to anyone until she grows up and says, "I want this one". A marriage that takes place without the consent of the girl is not an effective legal marriage.

A ketannah (literally meaning "little [one]") was any girl between the age of 3 years and that of 12 years plus one day; she was subject to her father's authority, and he could arrange a marriage for her without her agreement. However, after reaching the age of maturity, she would have to agree to the marriage to be considered as married. If the father was dead or missing, the brothers of the ketannah, collectively, had the right to arrange a marriage for her, as had her mother. In these situations, a ketannah would always have the right to annul her marriage, even if it was the first.

If the marriage did end (due to divorce or the husband's death), any further marriages were optional; the ketannah retained her right to annul them. The choice of a ketannah to annul a marriage, known in Hebrew as mi'un (literally meaning "refusal", "denial", "protest"), led to a true annulment, not a divorce; a divorce document (get) was not necessary, and a ketannah who did this was not regarded by legal regulations as a divorcee, in relation to the marriage. Unlike divorce, mi'un was regarded with distaste by many rabbinic writers, even in the Talmud; in earlier classical Judaism, one major faction – the House of Shammai – argued that such annulment rights only existed during the betrothal (not engagement) period (erusin) and not once the actual marriage (nissu'in) had begun.

== Intermarriage ==
Rates of marriage between Jews and non-Jews have increased in countries other than Israel (the Jewish diaspora). According to the National Jewish Population Survey 2000-01, 47% of marriages involving Jews in the United States between 1996 and 2001 were with non-Jewish partners. Jewish leaders in different branches generally agree that possible assimilation is a crisis, but they differ on the proper response to intermarriage.

=== Attitudes ===
- All branches of Orthodox Judaism do not sanction the validity or legitimacy of intermarriages.Orthodox teachings view marriage between a Jewish man and woman as a reunion of two halves of the same soul, thus a Jewish man to have any relationship with a "Shiksa" (gentile woman) or a Jewish woman to have any relationship with a goy (gentile man) would be considered a disgrace. Some Orthodox families observe shiva (mourning rites) for relatives who marry outside the faith, symbolically mourning the potential loss of future generations who may not be raised as Jewish. Intermarriage is sometimes referred to in Orthodox circles as the "Silent Holocaust." The only legal way for children of such relationships to be part of a Jewish community, is for them of their own free will to willingly accept the Iron Yoke of the Torah with help from Orthodox Jewish guidance.
- Conservative Judaism does not sanction intermarriage, but encourages acceptance of the non-Jewish spouse within the family, hoping that such acceptance will lead to conversion.
- Reform Judaism and Reconstructionist Judaism permit total personal autonomy in interpretation of Jewish Law, and intermarriage is not forbidden. Reform and Reconstructionist rabbis are free to take their own approach to performing marriages between a Jewish and non-Jewish partner. Many, but not all, seek agreement from the couple that the children will be raised as Jewish.

There are also differences between streams on what constitutes an intermarriage, arising from their differing criteria for being Jewish in the first place. Orthodox Jews only consider a child to be Jewish if the mother is of Jewish ancestry or has undergone a proper conversion as conducted by proper rabbinical authorities.

Among the general Jewish population in Israel, interfaith marriages are extremely rare; only about two percent were in an interfaith marriage. In addition, about 97 percent of Jews in the same Pew Research Center study, conducted in 2014-2015, did not approve of their child marrying a Muslim while 89 percent expressed similar views when asked about a hypothetical marriage to a Christian.

=== Interracial Marriage ===
Jewish prohibitions on marriage typically concern interfaith marriages. There is no historical prohibition of interracial marriage, nor is there explicit permission of such. However, debates around Numbers 12:1 suggest that Zipporah, the wife of Moses, is described as a "Cushite woman" to highlight a potentially much darker skin tone. Under modern social constructs, this would constitute Moses's marriage as an interracial one. However, there is no concrete proof that the Cushite woman referred to in Numbers is the same Zipporah from Exodus.

== Marriage in Israel ==
In Israel, the only institutionalized form of Jewish marriage is the religious one, i.e., a marriage conducted under the auspices of the rabbinate. Specifically, marriage of Israeli Jews must be conducted according to Jewish Law (halakha), as viewed by Orthodox Judaism. One consequence is that Jews in Israel who cannot marry according to Jewish law (e.g., a kohen and a divorcée, or a Jew and one who is not halachically Jewish), cannot marry each other. This has led for calls, mostly from the secular segment of the Israeli public, for the institution of civil marriage.

Some secular-Jewish Israelis travel abroad to have civil marriages, either because they do not wish an Orthodox wedding or because their union cannot be sanctioned by halakha. These marriages are legally recognized by the State, but are not recognized by the State Rabbinate.

Marriages performed in Israel must be carried out by religious authorities of an official religion (Judaism, Islam, Christianity, or Druze), unless both parties are without religion.

== Divorce ==
Halakha (Jewish Law) allows for divorce. The document of divorce is termed a get. The final divorce ceremony involves the husband giving the get document into the hand of the wife or her agent, but the wife may sue in rabbinical court to initiate the divorce. In such a case, a husband may be compelled to give the get, if he has violated any of his numerous obligations outlined in Jewish law and the couple's specific ketubah; Historically, this was sometimes accomplished by beating and or monetary coercion. The rationale was that since he was required to divorce his wife due to his (or her) violations of the contract, his good inclination desires to divorce her, and the community helps him to do what he wants to do anyway. In this case, the wife may or may not be entitled to a payment.

Since around the 12th century, some officials within Judaism have recognized the right of a wife abused physically or psychologically to a forced divorce.

Conservative Judaism follows halacha, although differently than Orthodox Judaism. Reform Jews usually use an egalitarian form of the Ketubah at their weddings. They generally do not issue Jewish divorces, seeing a civil divorce as both necessary and sufficient; however, some Reform rabbis encourage the couple to go through a Jewish divorce procedure. Orthodox Judaism does not recognize civil law as overriding religious law, and thus does not view a civil divorce as sufficient. Therefore, a man or woman may be considered divorced by the Reform Jewish community, but still married by the Conservative community. Orthodox Judaism usually does not recognize Reform weddings because according to Talmudic law, the witnesses to the marriage must be Jews who observe halakha, which is believed by Orthodox authorities to seldom be the case in Reform weddings.

=== Agunah ===
Traditionally, when a husband fled, or his whereabouts were unknown for any reason, the woman was considered an agunah (literally "an anchored woman"), and was not allowed to remarry; in traditional Judaism, divorce can only be initiated by the husband. Prior to modern communication, the death of the husband while in a distant land was a common cause of this situation. In modern times, when a husband refuses to issue a get due to money, property, or custody battles, the woman who cannot remarry is considered a Mesorevet get, not an agunah. A man in this situation would not be termed a Misarev Get (literally, "a refuser of a divorce document"), unless a legitimate Beis Din had required him to issue a Get. The term agunah is often used in such circumstances, but it is not technically accurate.

Within both the Conservative and Orthodox communities, there are efforts to avoid situations where a woman is not able to obtain a Jewish divorce from her husband. The ketubah serves this function in Conservative Judaism in order to prevent husbands from refusing to give their wives a divorce. To do this, the ketubah has built in provisions; so, if predetermined circumstances occur, the divorce goes into effect immediately. After the fact, various Jewish and secular legal methods are used to deal with such problems. None of the legal solutions addresses the agunah problem in the case of a missing husband.

== Same-sex marriage ==
=== In Orthodox Judaism ===
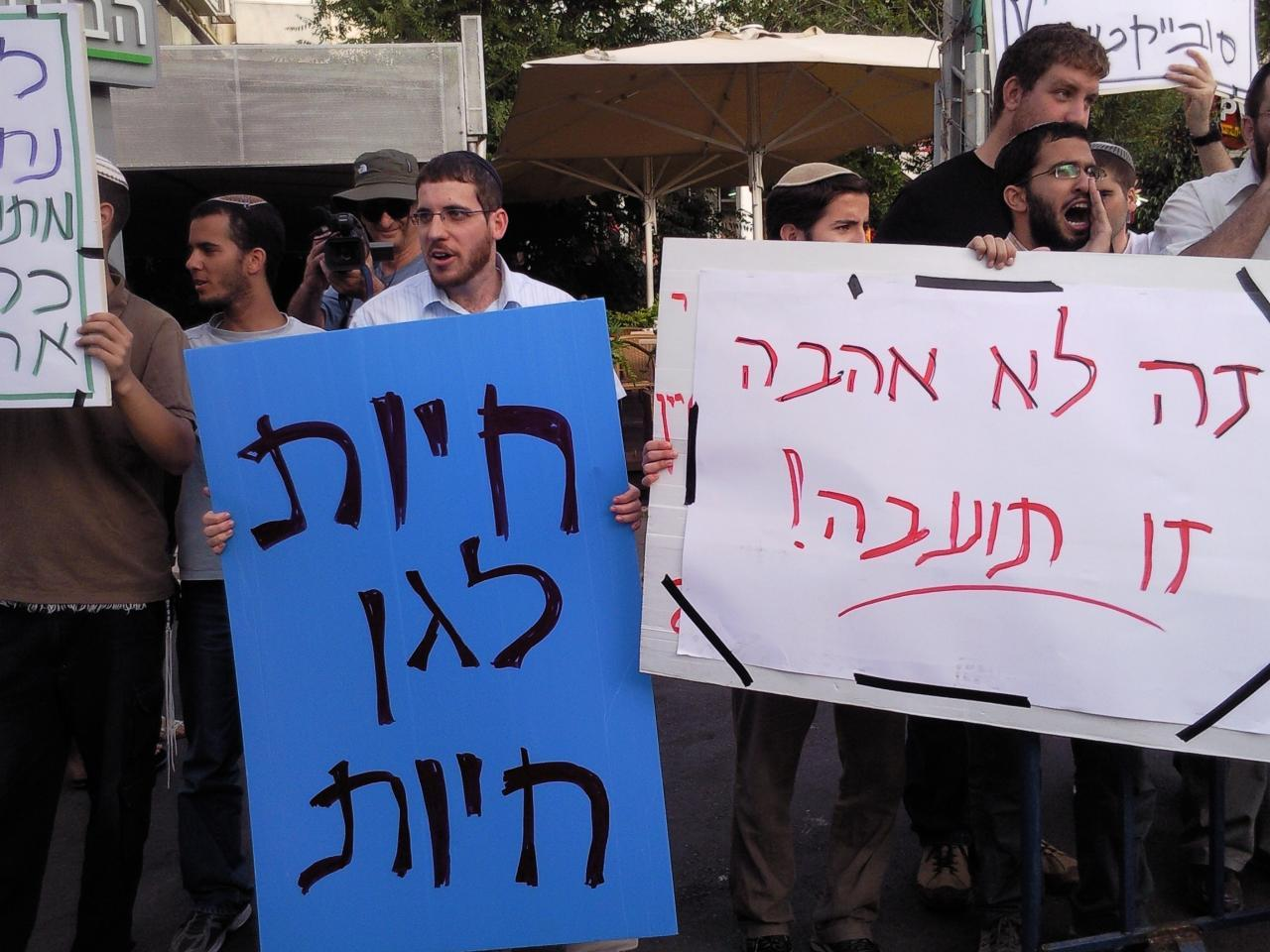
Orthodox Jewish protesters holding anti-LGBT signs during the Gay Pride parade in Haifa, Israel (2010)

Orthodox Judaism does not have a Jewish legal construct of same-gender marriage. While any two Jewish adults may be joined by a Jewish legal contract, the rites of kiddushin are reserved for a union of a man and woman.

=== In Conservative Judaism ===
In June 2012, the American branch of Conservative Judaism formally approved same-sex marriage ceremonies in a 13–0 vote with one abstention.

=== In Reform Judaism ===
In 1996, the Central Conference of American Rabbis passed a resolution approving same-sex civil marriage. However, this same resolution made a distinction between civil marriages and religious marriages; this resolution thus stated:

However we may understand homosexuality, whether as an illness, as a genetically based dysfunction or as a sexual preference and lifestyle – we cannot accommodate the relationship of two homosexuals as a "marriage" within the context of Judaism, for none of the elements of qiddushin (sanctification) normally associated with marriage can be invoked for this relationship.

The Central Conference of American Rabbis support the right of gay and lesbian couples to share fully and equally in the rights of civil marriage, and

That the CCAR oppose governmental efforts to ban gay and lesbian marriage.

That this is a matter of civil law, and is separate from the question of rabbinic officiation at such marriages.

In 1998, an ad hoc CCAR committee on human sexuality issued its majority report (11 to 1, 1 abstention) which stated that the holiness within a Jewish marriage "may be present in committed same gender relationships between two Jews and that these relationships can serve as the foundation of stable Jewish families, thus adding strength to the Jewish community." The report called for CCAR to support rabbis in officiating at same-sex marriages. Also in 1998, the Responsa Committee of the CCAR issued a lengthy teshuvah (rabbinical opinion) that offered detailed argumentation in support of both sides of the question whether a rabbi may officiate at a commitment ceremony for a same-sex couple.

In March 2000, CCAR issued a new resolution stating that "We do hereby resolve that the relationship of a Jewish, same gender couple is worthy of affirmation through appropriate Jewish ritual, and further resolve, that we recognize the diversity of opinions within our ranks on this issue. We support the decision of those who choose to officiate at rituals of union for same-sex couples, and we support the decision of those who do not."

=== In Reconstructionist Judaism ===
The Reconstructionist Rabbinical Association (RRA) encourages its members to officiate at same-sex marriages, though it does not require it of them.

== See also ==
- Jewish prenuptial agreement
- Negiah (guidelines for physical contact)
- Shadchan (matchmaker)
- Tzniut (modest behavior)
- Yichud (prohibitions of seclusion with the opposite sex)
