= Reverend King (Nigerian pastor) =

Nigerian Christian pastor

- Born: Chukwuemeka Ezeugo; Achina, Anambra State, Nigeria
- Occupation: Pastor

Chukwuemeka Ezeugo, usually known by his sobriquet Reverend King, is a Christian pastor from Anambra State in south-east Nigeria. In 2006, he rose to nationwide recognition following the murder of a church member, Ann Uzoh. He was subsequently sentenced to death in January 2007, and his conviction was upheld by the Supreme Court of Nigeria on 26 February 2016.

== Early life and education ==
Ezeugo was born in Umulekwe village in the Achina community of the Aguata local government area, Anambra State, Nigeria] He attended Premier Primary school in Onitsha for his basic education and obtained a degree in psychology at Nnamdi Azikiwe University.

== Ministry ==
Ezeugo is the founder of the Christian Praying Assembly, a religious organization for which he served as the general overseer until September 2006.

== Trial ==
On 26 September 2016, Ezeugo was arraigned before the Lagos High Court on six charges of murder and attempted murder. He was arrested and primarily charged over the murder of Ann Uzo, one of his church's members, to which he pled 'not guilty', as she was said to have died as a result of Ezeugo setting her on fire, with eyewitnesses saying he did it because he caught the victim in the act of fornication.

In whole, a total of 10 witnesses came forward to testify that Ezeugo was the perpetrator. The lawyer defending Ezeugo attempted to debunk the statements of the witnesses by pointing out discrepancies and contradictions in their earlier statements. These errors were however too little to prove anything substantial as the presiding judge, Justice Joseph Oyewole, of The Lagos High Court Ikeja, on 11 January 2007 found him guilty of the murder of Ann Uzoh and sentenced him to death by hanging, plus 20 years for attempted murder.

== Controversy ==
=== Illicit sex with members ===
During his trial in the Lagos High Court Ikeja, a witness, Edwin Akubue, who was later identified as a key and notable member of Reverend King's Ministry, testified that Ezeugo was romantically involved with his wife prior to the events of the trial.

=== Violence against parishioners ===
Ezeugo affirmed allegations that he molested his church members when he made this statement in the court of law.

"I am a preacher. I know that the spirit of witchcraft is against the Almighty God. If somebody is a liar, he is bewitching God. I don't condone lie. Dr. King does not condone sin. I flog a lot. I have canes. If husband and wife mess up by having misunderstanding, I have to settle them. But the person that is at fault, I must flog. If the person refuses to be flogged, I will send him out of the church."

=== Sexual perversion ===
During the trial, a female student named Miss Chibuzor was brought in to testify, by the then director of public persecutions named Mrs Bola Okikiolu-Ighile.

== Appeal ==
On 26 February 2017, the Supreme Court of Nigeria unanimously upheld the previous guilty ruling of the Lagos Division of the Court of Appeal and the initial court that tried Ezeugo, along with the sentence of death by hanging, with Justice Ngwuta remarking that "the facts of the case could have been lifted from a horror film." Lagos State's Attorney General and Commissioner for Justice, Adeniji Kazeem, praised the final verdict. In 2018, Kazeem would state that clemency would be possible if Ezeugo was deserving of it.

== 2019 presidential elections ==
Ezeugo was alleged to have filled the nomination form and his posters were on the streets for the office of the president in the 2019 Nigerian general election under Advanced Peoples Democratic Alliance (APDA). Although there were campaign posters of him circulating, his candidacy was false. In February 2021, for his birthday, the newspaper This Day published a 17-page colored advert praising Ezeugo.
