= Chukwudi Chukwuma =

Nigerian footballer

Personal information
- Date of birth: 27 May 1994 (age 32)
- Place of birth: Benin City, Nigeria
- Height: 1.78 m (5 ft 10 in)
- Position: Forward

Team information
- Current team: Sokol Brozany

Youth career
- 2010–2011: SESA

Senior career*
Years	Team	Apps	(Gls)
2012–2013	SESA		
2014–2016	FK Teplice	17	(0)
2015	→ Varnsdorf (loan)	4	(0)
2016–2021	Sokol Brozany		
2021	FK Pelister	1	(0)
2021–	Sokol Brozany		
- * Club domestic league appearances and goals as of 20 February 2022 (UTC)

Chukwudi Chukwuma (born 27 May 1994) is a Nigerian professional footballer who plays as a forward for Sokol Brozany in the Bohemian Football League.

== Career ==
=== Early career ===
Born in Nigeria, Chukwuma moved to India in 2006 at the age of 11, and schooled at the Don Bosco High School in Panaji, Goa where he played school football until 2010. In 2010, he jointed the Sesa Football Academy in Goa, after his father, Clifford Chukwuma was appointed as the club's head coach. Eventually making it to the first-team at the Sesa, he played in the I-League 2nd Division and Goa Professional League for his side.

=== FK Teplice ===
In November 2013, Chukwuma went on trial with Czech First League side FK Teplice where he impressed coaches, scoring a goal in a friendly match against FK Meteor Prague VIII. He signed a four-year deal with FK Teplice in December 2013. and made his professional debut with the club on 2 March 2014 against Sigma Olomouc, coming on as a 79th-minute substitute for Admir Ljevaković, as Teplice won 4–0.

Chukwuma scored his first goal for the club on 30 September 2014 against TJ Jiskra Domažlice in the Czech Cup. His goal in the 70th minute was the third in a 4–0 victory.

On 30 September 2016, it was confirmed that Chukwuma had left Teplice due to heath issues.

==== FK Varnsdorf (loan) ====
In September 2015, Chukwuma was loaned to FK Varnsdorf of the Czech 2. Liga. He made his debut on 13 September 2015 against Táborsko. He played 58 minutes before being substituted off for David Špaček as Vansdorf lost 3–1.

== Personal life ==
Chukwudi's father, Clifford Chukwuma, is a former semi-professional footballer who played in the late 1980s in the Nigerian Premier League, and has worked in India for the Sesa Football Academy and for I-League club Sporting Clube de Goa.

== Career statistics ==
As of 14 October 2016

Club	Season	League			League Cup		Domestic Cup		International		Total	
Club	Season	Division	Apps	Goals	Apps	Goals	Apps	Goals	Apps	Goals	Apps	Goals
FK Teplice	2013–14	Czech First League	7	0	—	—	0	0	—	—	7	0
FK Teplice	2014–15	Czech First League	5	0	—	—	5	1	—	—	10	1
FK Teplice	2015–16	Czech First League	5	0	—	—	0	0	—	—	5	0
FK Varnsdorf (loan)	2015–16	Czech Second League	4	0	0	0	0	0	—	—	4	0
Career total			21	0	0	0	5	1	0	0	26	1
