= Chinonso =

Given name

- Gender: Unisex, although more commonly masculine
- Language: Igbo

Origin
- Meaning: Chi is near
- Region of origin: Igboland

Other names
- Variant form: Chinomso
- Short forms: Nonso, Nomso

Chinonso // is an Igbo given name. It means “chi is near”. Similarly, there is the name Chinomso, which means “chi is within my reach”.

== Names ==
Notable people with the name include:

- Chinonso Arubayi, Nigerian television actress, producer and model
- Chinonso Chibueze (born 2006), English football player
- Chinonso Emeka (born 2001), Nigerian footballer
- Chinonso Offor (born 2000), Nigerian footballer
- Chinonso Onuh (born 1992), Nigerian footballer
- Chinonso Ukah (born 1994), Nigerian actress and influencer
