= Chukwuebuka Onah =

Nigerian association football player

Personal information
- Full name: Chukwuebuka Onah
- Date of birth: 17 May 2000 (age 26)
- Height: 1.65 m (5 ft 5 in)
- Position: Left back

Senior career*
Years	Team	Apps	(Gls)
2018–2020	Baladeyet El Mahalla	4	(0)
2019	→ Al Hammam (loan)	0	(0)
2020–2022	Al-Nasr	0	(0)
2021–2022	→ Al Urooba (loan)	2	(0)
2022–2023	Masfout	22	(0)
2023–2024	Dibba Al-Hisn		
2024–2025	Al Dhaid		
- * Club domestic league appearances and goals as of 14:48, 24 February 2021 (UTC)

Chukwuebuka Onah (born 17 May 2000) is a Nigerian footballer who currently plays as a Right wing.

== Career statistics ==
=== Club ===
As of 24 February 2021.

Club	Season	League		Cup	Cup		Cup		Continental		Other		Total
Club	Season	Division	Apps	Goals	Apps	Goals	Apps	Goals	Apps	Goals	Apps	Goals	
Baladeyet El Mahalla	2018–19	Egyptian Second Division	24	14	0	0	0	0	0	0	6	0	
Baladeyet El Mahalla	2019–20	Egyptian Second Division	27	17	0	0	0	0	0	0	12	0	
Baladeyet El Mahalla	Total		51	31	0	0	0	0	0	0	18	0	
Al-Nasr	2020–21	UAE Pro League	25	14	2	0	1 (Note: Appearances in the UAE League Cup)	0	0	0	1	0	
Al Urooba (loan)	2021–22	UAE Pro League	20	9	4	0	0	0	0	0	0	0	
Career total			45	23	0	0	1	0	0	0	19	0	
