= Emeka Nwadike =

English footballer (born 1978)

Chukwuemeka Nwadike
Personal information
- Full name: Chukwuemeka Ibezimife Nwadike
- Date of birth: 9 August 1978 (age 48)
- Place of birth: Camberwell, England
- Position: Midfielder

Youth career
- 1996: Wolverhampton Wanderers

Senior career*
Years	Team	Apps	(Gls)
1996–1998	Shrewsbury Town	57	(4)
1998–2000	Grantham Town		
2000–2001	King's Lynn		
2001–2003	Ilkeston Town		
2002	→ Hednesford Town (loan)		
2003–2007	Alfreton Town	126	(?)
2007–2008	Worcester City	31	(8)
2008–2009	AFC Telford United	20	(0)
2008–2009	→ Hinckley United (loan)	10	(1)
2009–2010	Eastwood Town		
2010–2011	Gainsborough Trinity	0	(0)
2011–2012	Eastwood Town	?	(?)
2012	Mickleover Sports		
2012–2013	Grantham Town	60	(3)
2013–2014	Stamford	9	(0)
2014–2015	Rainworth Miners Welfare		
- * Club domestic league appearances and goals

Chukwuemeka Ibezimife Nwadike // (born 9 August 1978) is an English former professional footballer.

He played as a midfielder notably in the Football League for Shrewsbury Town between 1996 and 1998. Following on from that he held a career in Non-League football and played for Grantham Town, King's Lynn, Ilkeston Town, Hednesford Town, Alfreton Town, Worcester City, AFC Telford United, Hinckley United, Eastwood Town, Gainsborough Trinity, Mickleover Sports, Stamford and Rainworth Miners Welfare.

== Career ==
Nwadike began his career in the youth ranks at Wolverhampton Wanderers but was snubbed a professional contract and was snapped up by Shrewsbury Town in 1996. After two seasons at Gay Meadow he was released and exited the Football League to join Non-League Grantham Town. He moved on to King's Lynn in 2000 and then on to Ilkeston Town in 2001.

Ilkeston loaned Nwadike to Hednesford Town in 2003, and he was eventually released at the end of the 2002–2003 season. In June 2003 he signed for Northern Premier League side Alfreton Town on a free transfer, eventually becoming club captain as well as making 126 league appearances, some of which came in the Conference North division that was formed in 2004 with Alfreton as a founding member. In 2007, he joined Worcester City, and later A.F.C. Telford United a year later. Following 20 appearances for United in the 2008–2009 season he was made available for loan and signed with Hinckley United for the remainder of the season.

In July 2009 Nwadike joined Eastwood Town, and a year later he was amongst a number of new signings made by Brian Little at Gainsborough Trinity. He failed to make a single appearance for the club from joining the club in July 2010 to his departure in March 2011, namely because of an achilles injury. He re-joined Eastwood Town in March and in June 2011 he began an employment tribunal against Gainsborough for a confidential matter between club and player.

Nwadike then joined Northern Premier League team Stamford A.F.C. in February 2014 to add some experience to a young team in their bid to remain in the division having been promoted via the play-offs the season before.
