= Erusin =

Hebrew term for betrothal

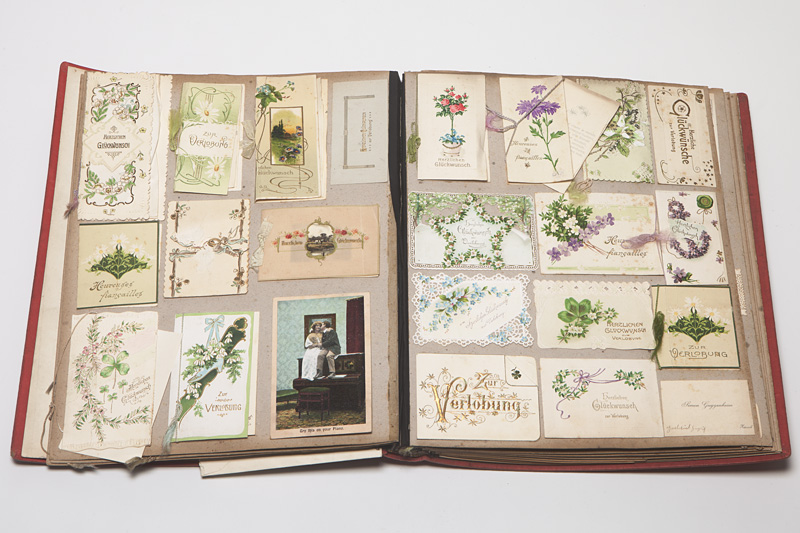
Engagement book of Jakob Wyler and Robertine Bloch, 1907, Brugg, today in the collection of the Jewish Museum of Switzerland

Erusin (Hebrew: אירוסין, romanized: ʾerusin, also Babylonian ʾirrusin) is the Hebrew term for betrothal. In Modern Hebrew, erusin means engagement, but this is not the historical meaning of the term, which is the first part of marriage, the second part being the nissuin "nuptials".

Since the Middle Ages it is customary for the marriage to occur immediately after the betrothal, and to perform the betrothal during the marriage ceremony itself. Previously, this was not the case, and there were often several months between the two events, according to Ketubot 57b: "a virgin is given twelve months to prepare for her wedding? ... a widow given her thirty days".

In Hebrew and rabbinic literature, betrothal is frequently referred to as "sanctification" (Hebrew: קידושין, romanized: qiddushin), on account of the bride becoming "sanctified" (dedicated) to the groom.

== In the Hebrew Bible ==
The Book of Deuteronomy introduces the concept of erusin. This holds the couple accountable to the law against adultery, which is punishable by death, while not fully considering them as married in Deuteronomy 22:23

An untraditional view is that the betrothal was effected simply by purchasing the girl from her father (or guardian) (i.e., paying a bride price to the bride and her father). The price paid for her is known by the Hebrew term mohar (מוהר). It was customary in biblical times for the bride and her father to be given parts of the mohar. Gradually, it lost its original meaning. The custom arose of giving the mohar entirely to the bride rather than her father.

The traditional commentators do not necessarily explain mohar this way. Rashi understands mohar as a form of ketubah (an agreement to pay a certain amount upon divorce), and Nachmanides understands it as sovlanut, a sort of dowry or engagement present. Rashi understands Rachel and Leah's complaint to Jacob ("we are considered strangers to him for he has sold us") as saying that it was not normal for a father to sell his daughters—at least not without also giving them a dowry.

Consent from a betrothed woman is not explicitly mentioned as a requirement in the Bible, but permission to forgo consent is not explicitly permitted either. That said, after encountering Rebekah (Genesis 24:15-16), Abraham's servant sought permission from her family for her to accompany him and become the wife of Isaac (Genesis 24:58).

== In the Talmud ==
=== The legal act ===
The Talmud states that there are three methods of performing erusin: by handing the woman a coin or object of nominal value, by handing her a document, or through consummation (sexual intercourse), although the last is prohibited by the Talmud because it is considered to be indecent for witnesses to watch a couple having intercourse: erusin ceremonies are to be confirmed by two witnesses. In all cases, the woman's consent is required; however, it can be implied by her silence.

== The ceremony ==
=== The blessings ===
A blessing over wine precedes the erusin and then the birkat erusin "betrothal blessing". If forgotten before the ceremony, it can be recited before the ketubah is read. Originally, the groom recited the blessings, but today it is more common for someone else to recite them such as the wedding's Rabbi.

=== The betrothal ===
Today, the custom is to perform the betrothal by giving the bride a well-known and fairly constant-valued object: a gold wedding ring without a stone. The groom takes the ring and says in Hebrew, "Behold, you are consecrated to me with this ring according to the laws of Moses and Israel." The groom now places the ring on the bride’s index finger.

=== The ketubah ===
To separate the erusin and nissuin, the ketubah is read.

=== Other issues ===
For legal purposes, a betrothed couple are regarded as husband and wife. Similarly, the union can only be ended by the same divorce process as married couples. However, betrothal does not oblige the couple to behave towards each other in the manner that a married couple is required to, nor does it permit the couple to have a sexual relationship.

The rabbis prohibited shiddukhin, marrying without an engagement. Therefore, an old custom is to sign a Shetar haT'na'im as a formal form of engagement, forming an informal declaration of the couple's intentions is read close to the start of the betrothal ceremony.

== See also ==
- Chuppah
- Jewish views on marriage
