= Yichud =

Prohibition of seclusion of a man and a woman who are not married to each other

Halakhic texts relating to this article
- Torah: Deuteronomy 13:6
- Babylonian Talmud: Kiddushin 80b and Sanhedrin 21
- Shulchan Aruch: Even HaEzer 22 and 24

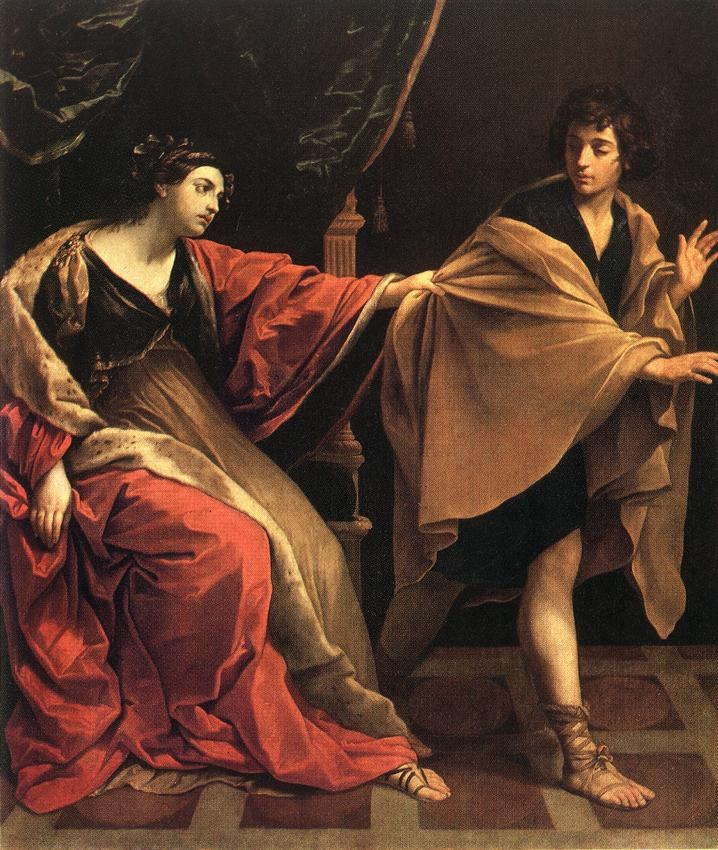
The Biblical story about Joseph and Potiphar's wife is an example of the risks with yichud.

In Jewish religious law (halakha), the laws of yichud (Hebrew: איסור ייחוד, romanized: issur yichud, lit. 'prohibition of seclusion') prohibit seclusion in a private area of a man and a woman who are not married to each other. Such seclusion is prohibited out of fear that sexual intercourse or other, lesser acts may occur. A person who is present in order to prevent yichud is called a shomer.

The laws of yichud are typically followed in strict Orthodox Judaism. Adherents of Conservative and Reform Judaism do not generally abide by the laws of yichud.

The term "yichud" also refers to a ritual during an Ashkenazi Jewish wedding in which the newly married couple spends a period secluded in a room by themselves. In earlier historical periods, as early as the talmudic era, the couple would have sexual intercourse at this time, but that practice is no longer current.

== Source of the prohibition ==
Deuteronomy 13:7 says:

If your very own brother, or your son or daughter, or the wife you love, or your closest friend secretly entices you, saying, 'Let us go and worship other gods, gods that neither you nor your ancestors have known...'

The Talmud gives an explanation to the passage, which is supposed to be a hint of yichud:

Said Rabbi Johanan on the authority of Rabbi Ishmael, Where do we find an allusion to yihud in the Torah? - For it is written: If thy brother, the son of thy mother, entices thee [etc.]: does then only a mother's son entice, and not a father's son? But it is to tell you: a son may be alone with his mother, but not with any other woman interdicted in the Torah.

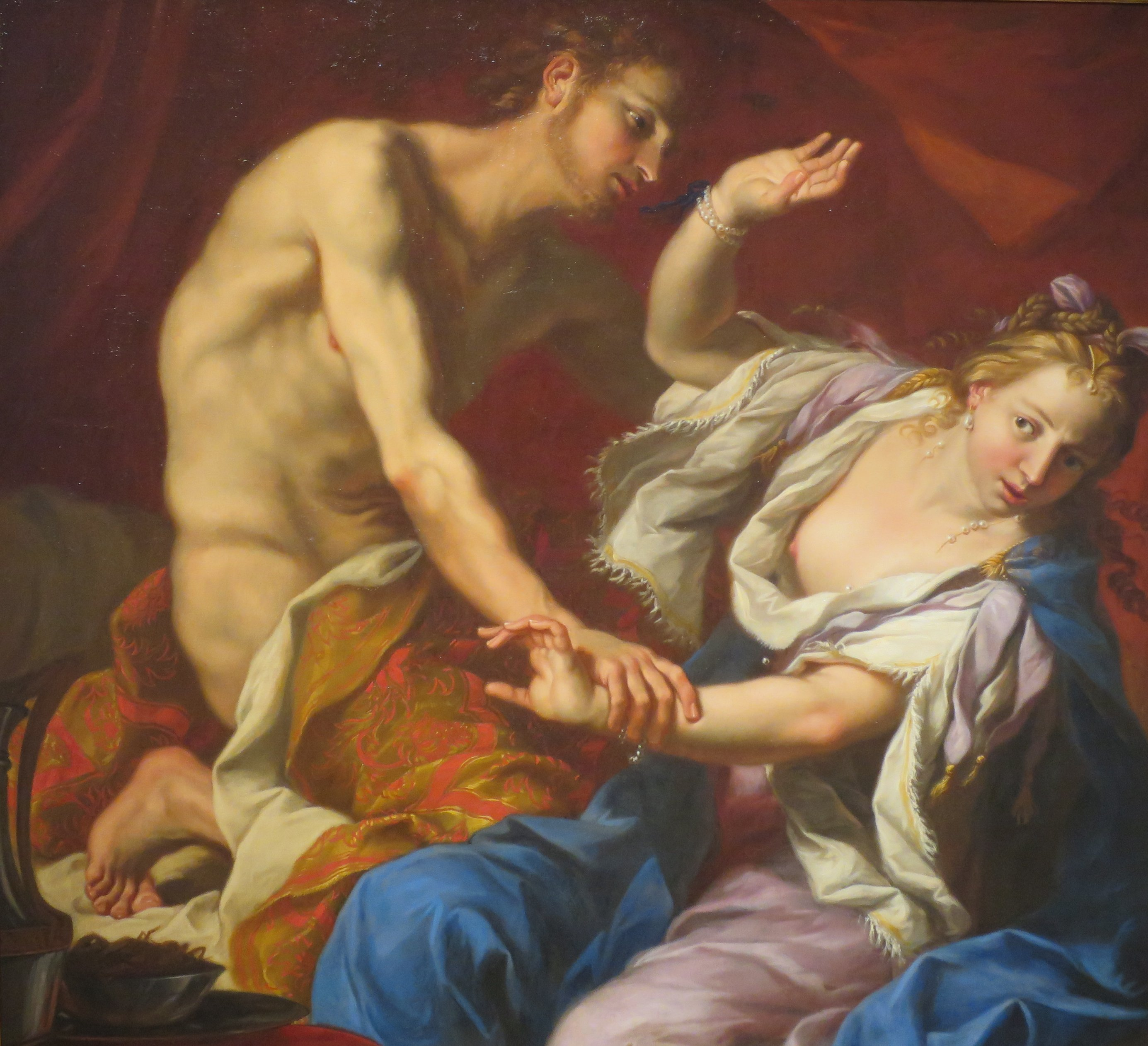
According to Talmud, Amnon's rape of his half-sister Tamar led King David to extend the prohibition of yichud to unmarried girls. 17th-century painting.

The Talmud also claims that after the rape of Tamar, daughter of David, when she was left alone with her half-brother Amnon, David and his high court extended this prohibition to unmarried girls as well. Later, in the times of Shammai and Hillel the Elder, the prohibition was extended to include a non-Jewish woman. These rules are discussed in the Talmud.

Most rishonim define the prohibition of yichud as a Torah law. Although Maimonides writes that the prohibition of yichud is derived from divrei kabbalah (Bible texts later than the Pentateuch), many interpret his words as meaning that it is a Torah law, though some regard it as a rabbinic prohibition.

Rashi maintained that insofar as the prohibition of yichud is mandated by the Torah, it is an essential prohibition, whereas rabbinical extensions of the prohibition are enacted as a fence meant to distance a person from forbidden relationships. Hence, leniencies would apply only to the rabbinic additions to the laws of yichud. Halachic consensus, following Maimonides, is, though, that leniencies apply even to Torah-mandated yichud laws.

== Laws ==
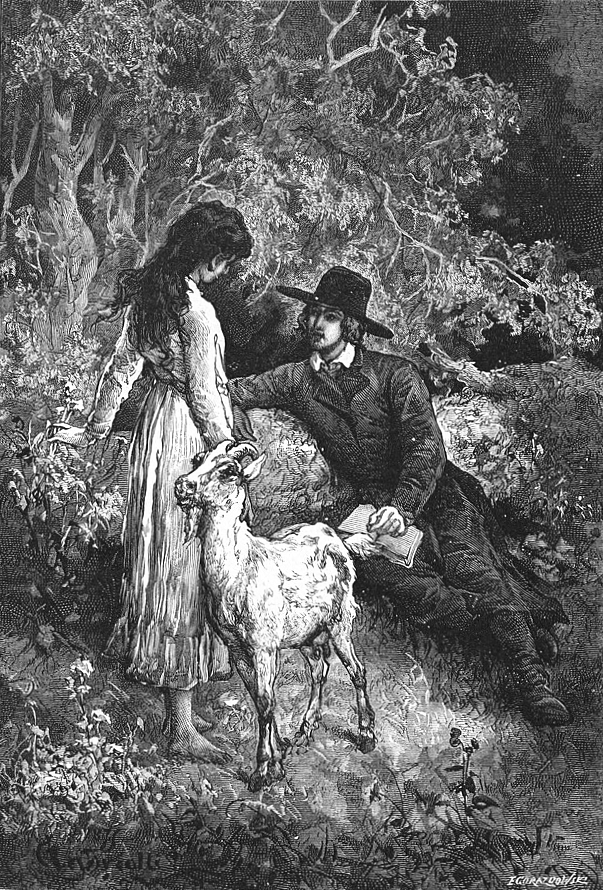
Yichud also applies outdoors. Illustration from Eliza Orzeszkowa's novel Meir Ezofowicz, which deals with the conflict between Jewish orthodoxy and modern liberalism.

The laws of yichud provide for strong restrictions on unrelated members of the opposite sex being secluded together, and milder ones for close family members. Different opinions exist regarding application of these laws both in terms of situation and in terms of the individuals involved. Prohibition of yichud applies to men over 13 years and, generally, girls over three, and a woman over twelve may not be alone with a boy over nine. Even seclusion of short duration is forbidden, if it could potentially last longer.

== Leniencies ==
There are a number of circumstances under which the prohibition of yichud may be circumvented. Typically, these apply fully to yichud with an observant Jew. Meeting a non-Jew or a secular Jew may require more scrupulousness.

=== Baaloh B'ir – in town ===
If the husband is in town (Baaloh B'ir, or Baala Bair) or, more precisely, if it is possible that he can appear suddenly, a woman may be secluded with another man in her home. The fear of his sudden appearance is considered a deterrent to engaging in illicit behavior. If the husband works fixed hours, or if they meet where they are not likely to be found, the husband's presence in town does not circumvent yichud. A close, long-standing relationship (Libo Gas Boh) between the wife and another man also proscribes yichud in spite of the husband's presence in town. The lenience caused by the man's presence in town does not, however, apply to his being secluded with another woman when his wife may appear suddenly. Paradoxically, if a husband gives his wife permission to be secluded with a man, the lenience no longer applies, since she does not fear his sudden entrance.

Rashi believes that the husband's presence in town only mitigates the prohibition rather than abrogating it. The Shulchan Aruch, following Tosafot, however, rule that when the husband is in town, the yichud restriction does not apply at all.

Maimonides and Shulchan Aruch write that the rationale for Baaloh B'ir is that "her husband's fear is upon her." This does not imply a concrete fear that her husband will enter unexpectedly, but rather that she feels a natural inhibition in the knowledge that her husband is close by. As a consequence of this, she can be in yichud with another man in a large city, like London or New York, where the chance that he suddenly appears is non-existent. Neither does her husband's permission undermine the leniency, according to this interpretation. Rashi interprets Baalo B'ir as referring to a concrete fear of sudden exposure. So does rabbi Moshe Feinstein, who consequently rules in a stricter way. Another issue of debate is whether cities that have grown together to form a continuous area are to be treated as one city. Rabbi Shlomo Zalman Auerbach argues that if the wife is in Ramat Gan and the husband is in Tel Aviv, he is still considered to be "in town". Since there are no significant uninhabited areas separating these cities, they are defined as one city from a Halachic perspective.

=== Pesach Posuach – open door ===
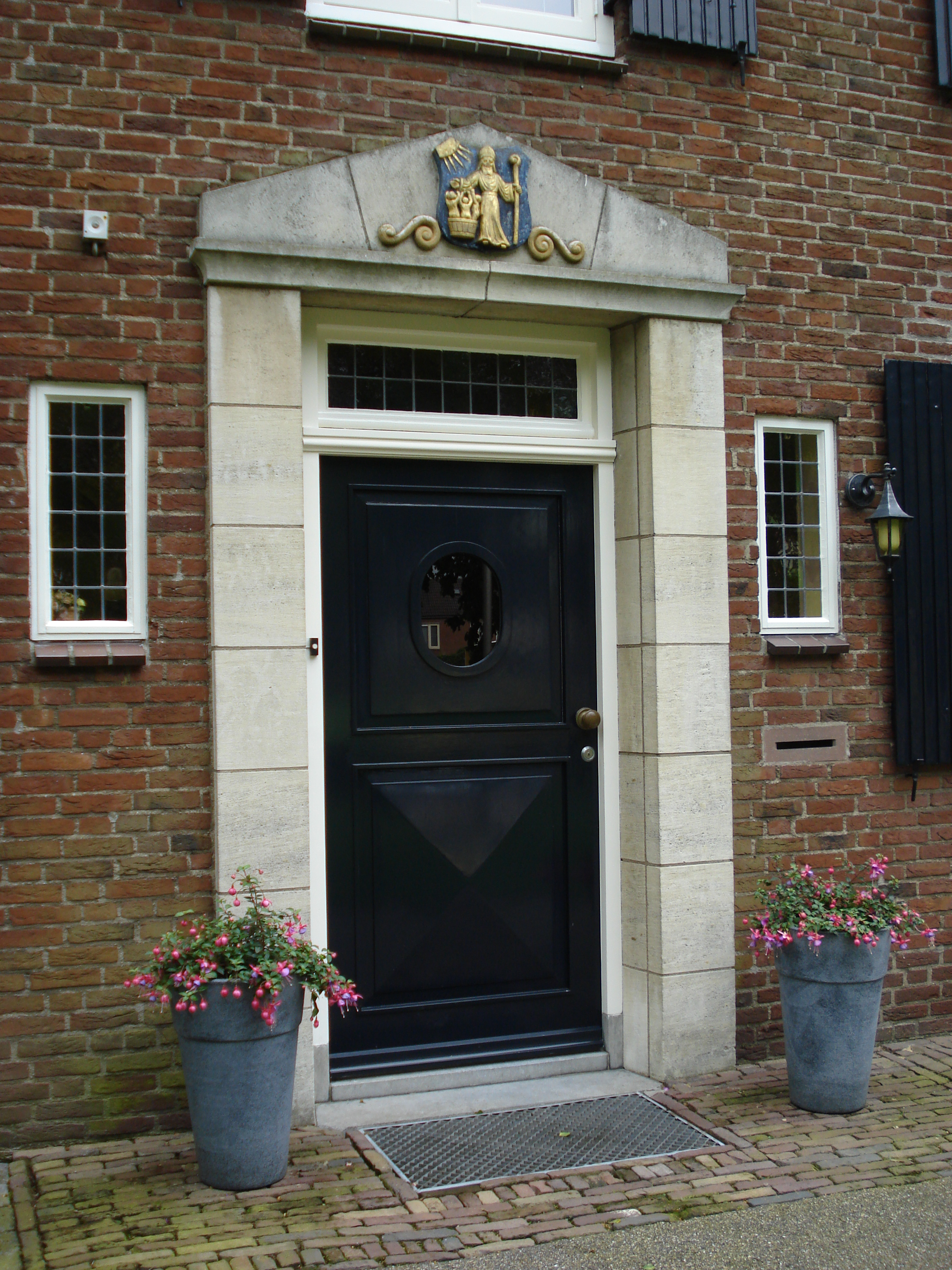
The door is considered open as long as it is not locked, and the prohibition of yichud is circumvented.

Yichud is alleviated when the door is open. This principle is known as pesach pasuach lireshus harabim (lit. an open doorway to the public domain). The Shulchan Aruch rules: "If the door is open to the public domain, there is no concern of yichud." This ruling has been interpreted and enlarged in various ways: 1. the door is actually open 2. when the door is closed but unlocked 3. then door is locked, but somebody with a key is liable to come in at any time 4. the door is locked, but there is a reasonable possibility that people may knock on the door and expect to be answered (according to Moshe Feinstein). A woman being secluded with another man is also justified when people outside can see through the window what is going on inside the house. In case of a close, long-standing friendship between the man and the woman, however, a more stringent behavior is expected. The leniency usually does not apply late at night, as there is little or no chance that people would come in unexpectedly then.

=== Shomrim – guards ===
Yichud can be circumvented by the presence of other individuals (shomrim, guards or chaperones), who would serve to provide a check on the man's behavior. Generally, Torah-observant Jewish men qualify as shomrim. Female relatives that permit yichud are: a man's mother; his daughter or granddaughter; his sister; his grandmother; and a woman's mother-in-law, daughter-in-law and sister-in-law. Children aged 6–9 also qualify.

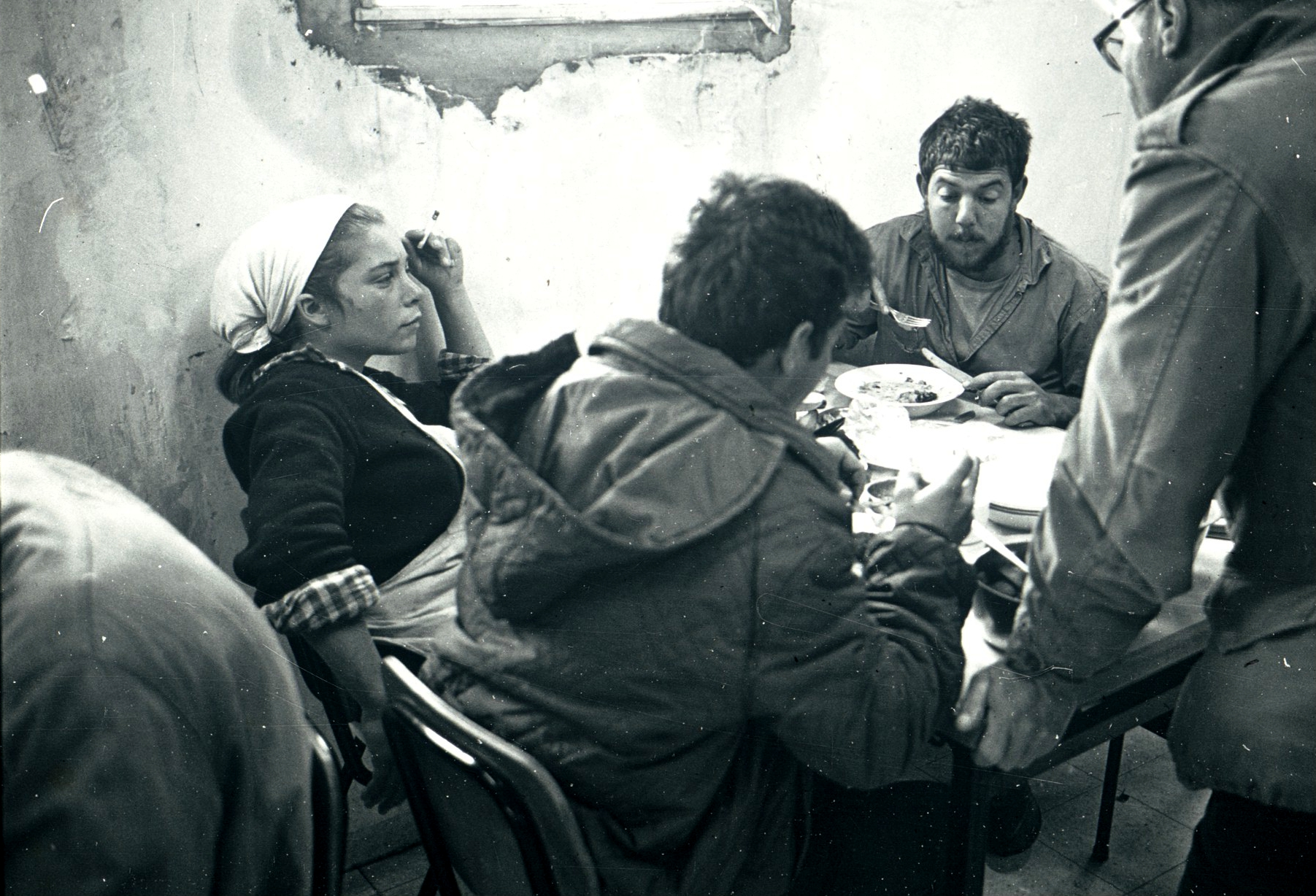
A woman may be secluded with a man if one or more additional men are present.

Although yichud with a woman and two or more men, according to most poskim, is permitted during day time and in the evening, the presence of at least three men is required during nighttime sleeping hours. The same goes for situations when children are present instead of adults. Sephardic Jews require the presence of the wife of one of the men for a woman to be secluded with them.

Shulchan Aruch, though, follows Maimonides in ruling that yichud with one woman is prohibited even with many men. The disagreement is based on a passage in Gemara, which states that the permission for two men to be secluded with one woman applies only to kosher people, and tells a story where two amoraim met a woman in a secluded place, and one of them preferred to leave, since perchance only tzaddikim are defined as kosher. Nissim of Gerona considered this an excessive stringency and thought that regular people are defined as kosher. Moses Isserles follows this view and states that yichud with one woman and several men is prohibited only for promiscuous people.

According to Rashi, yichud is permitted when at least three women are present, but most poskim follow Maimonides, who ruled that no number of women present circumvents the prohibition of yichud. Many poskim permit yichud in the presence of the man's grandmother, mother, daughter, granddaughter or sister (over seven years), but do not accept the woman's daughter, granddaughter or sister. Avraham Danzig writes that the prohibition for one man to be in seclusion with two women is only rabbinic, whereas Torah law only prohibits a man from being secluded with one woman.

There are numerous other exceptions; this article presents the haredi point of view.

== Siblings ==
It is preferable that a brother and sister who have reached the age of six should not sleep in the same room. Yichud between a brother and a sister above the age of Bar and Bat Mitzvah is considered appropriate for a short term, but not when their parents are away for an extended period of time. There are various opinions about the duration of a permitted yichud. Some poskim allow only up to three nights; others allow up to thirty days. If the brother and sister live separately and one comes to visit the other, yichud is permitted as long as they do not stay longer than the normal stay of a house guest (where circumstances like the distance of their residence is taken into account). However, when a sibling moves in on a permanent basis, yichud is forbidden even for one day.

== Biological children ==
Yichud with biological children is fully permitted. The Gemara explains that God was moved by the prayers of the Great Assembly to curtail the yetzer hara for incest so there is no need for a prohibition when it comes to biological parents and children.

== Adopted children ==
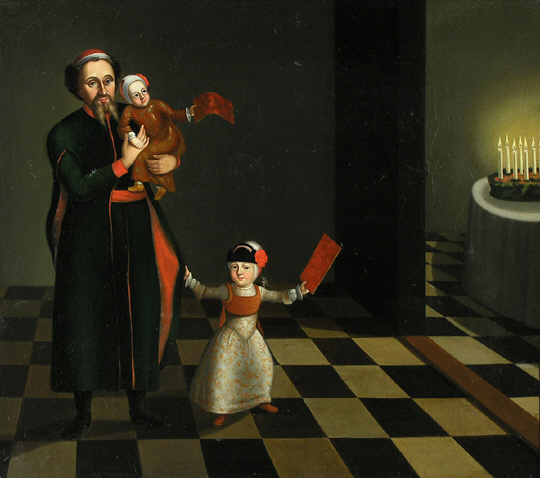
Yichud with one's biological children is legitimate, but if they are adopted, restrictions apply. 18th-century painting.

Opinions among Poskim are divided about yichud between adoptive parents and their children of the opposite gender, who were adopted at a very young age. Rabbis Moshe Feinstein, Eliezer Waldenberg, Hayim David HaLevi, and Nahum Rabinovitch all ruled that adoptive parents are permitted to engage in yichud with their adopted children since sexual attraction normally does not occur in such situations. Feinstein, though, restricts the permission to situations when both adoptive parents are alive and married to each other, and Waldenberg only permits yichud if a girl was adopted before the age of three and a boy was adopted before the age of nine. Ovadia Yosef is essentially lenient about this issue, though he believes that it is preferable to adopt a girl so that the wife who is home most of the time can prevent yichud with the husband from occurring.

The lenient view is strongly opposed by others, particularly in Haredi Judaism. Menachem Mendel Schneerson vigorously argued that yichud is forbidden in the adoptive situation. He insists that this was common custom in earlier generations. Dov Berish Weidenfeld, Yaakov Yisrael Kanievsky, Ezra Ettiah, Avrohom Yeshaya Karelitz, and Shmuel Wosner take the same position.

== Unmarried couples ==
A man and woman who are engaged to be married may not dwell together unless other people are in the same house, and the door is unlocked. Leaving the door slightly ajar is commendable. They may not stay together even on a temporary basis, such as in a hotel. According to some poskim, sleeping in the same house if other family members are present does not violate yichud laws, but should be avoided due to tzniut considerations. Others, including Moses Isserles and Joseph Soloveitchik, however, disagree about this and would not permit sleeping in the home of their future in-laws.

According to Haredi authorities, though mingling of men and women does not violate the prohibition of yichud, it should nonetheless be avoided, even if it is for the purpose of fulfilling a mitzvah. Regardless of whether yichud takes place or not, girlfriend/boyfriend relationships are forbidden according to some, since dating, according to halacha, should not serve other purposes than finding a suitable marriage partner.

== Babysitting and caregiving ==
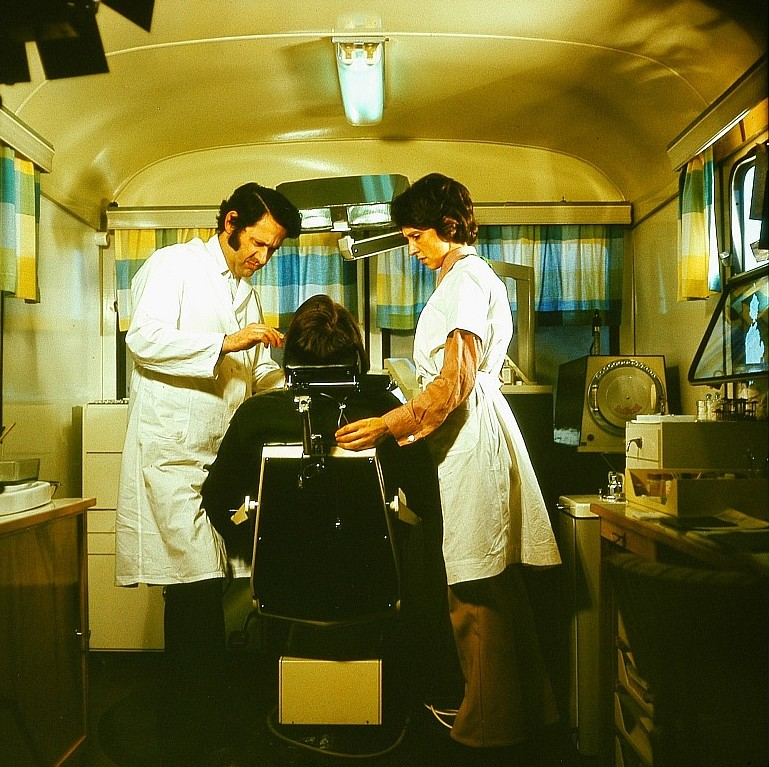
Visiting a doctor's or dentist's office has to occur during regular office hours, when people may enter unexpectedly.

Unless it is one's own child, grandchild or sibling, a female over the age of 12 should not babysit a boy 9 or older, and a male over the age of 13 should not babysit a girl 3 or older. The prohibition of yichud makes some natural solutions problematic, e.g. when a teenage girl who might babysit her sister's son has to consider the possibility of getting into yichud with her brother-in-law. The situation may be evaded by the presence of another boy or girl aged 6–9, or, such children lacking, by giving a key to the neighbors and asking them to come in unexpectedly. If a father is single, or his wife is away, and he employs a female babysitter, he has to take care that he does not enter the house before the babysitter has exited, unless there are shomrim present; or else, at least he should leave the door open.

Visiting a doctor's office is allowed during regular office hours, when people may enter unexpectedly. Otherwise, a shomer is required. Mortal danger always overrides yichud laws, although there are authorities who disagree with this. Serious illness, on the other hand, does not alleviate the prohibition of yichud. An exception is, according to Moshe Feinstein, a male patient who has been diagnosed as impotent, but in this case marit ayin calls for carefulness. A dependent adult person in need of care should take a caregiver of the same gender. This applies also to very old men. During daytime, an opposite gender housekeeper and medical staff may visit if the door is unlocked, or the neighbors have a key and are asked to come in unannounced from time to time. Some poskim are lenient when it comes to a doctor's interaction with his patients, since he is supposedly consumed by his work and not likely to think sinful thoughts. They invoke Gemara, which applies this reasoning to allow a professional to mate animals, although it is otherwise forbidden to watch animals mate.

Therapists of the same sex are preferable, but when there is no one else as qualified as a therapist of the opposite gender, there is green light as long as leniences of yichud are in place. Since the client develops a close relationship with the therapist, Baaloh B'ir does not count.

== Transportation ==
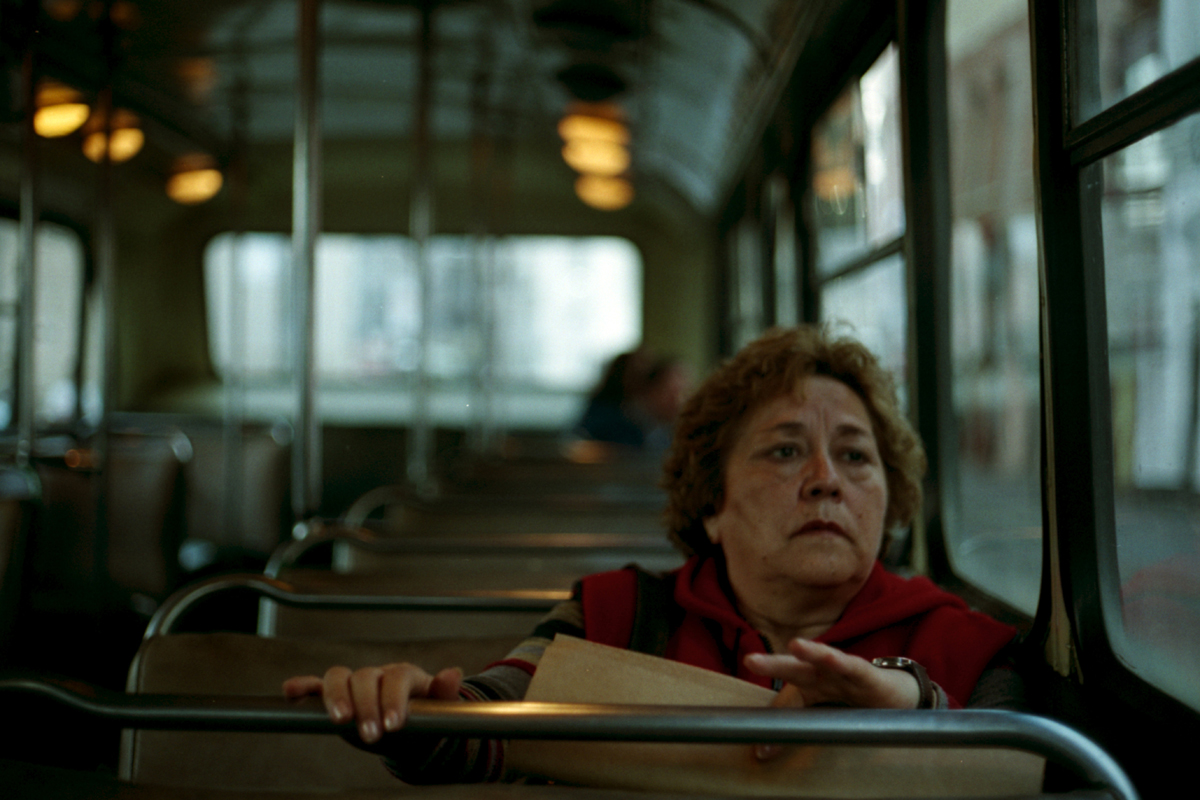
Yichud situations may arise if other passengers get off the bus or taxi, and a woman is left alone with the driver.

Two unrelated, opposite-gender persons may travel in a vehicle together within the local area, but should not take out-of-town trips together, particularly if they are traveling to an area where they are not known to anyone, and will not be able to return on the same day. For tzniut considerations, the woman had better sit in the rear if the man is driving (or vice versa), and engaging in prolonged conversation is not advisable.

If a woman is traveling in a bus or taxi, and the other passengers get off, leaving her alone with the driver, she should leave the vehicle, unless they drive where there are passersby or a steady stream of traffic. On a bus, train or airplane, sitting adjacent to a member of the opposite gender is permitted, but many Orthodox Jews follow stringencies to avoid this due to the laws of negiah and tzniut. According to most poskim, there are no restrictions on being secluded together momentarily in a temporary environment, such as an elevator. Since elevators are boarded constantly, there is always a chance that anyone could enter without warning.

== Business ==
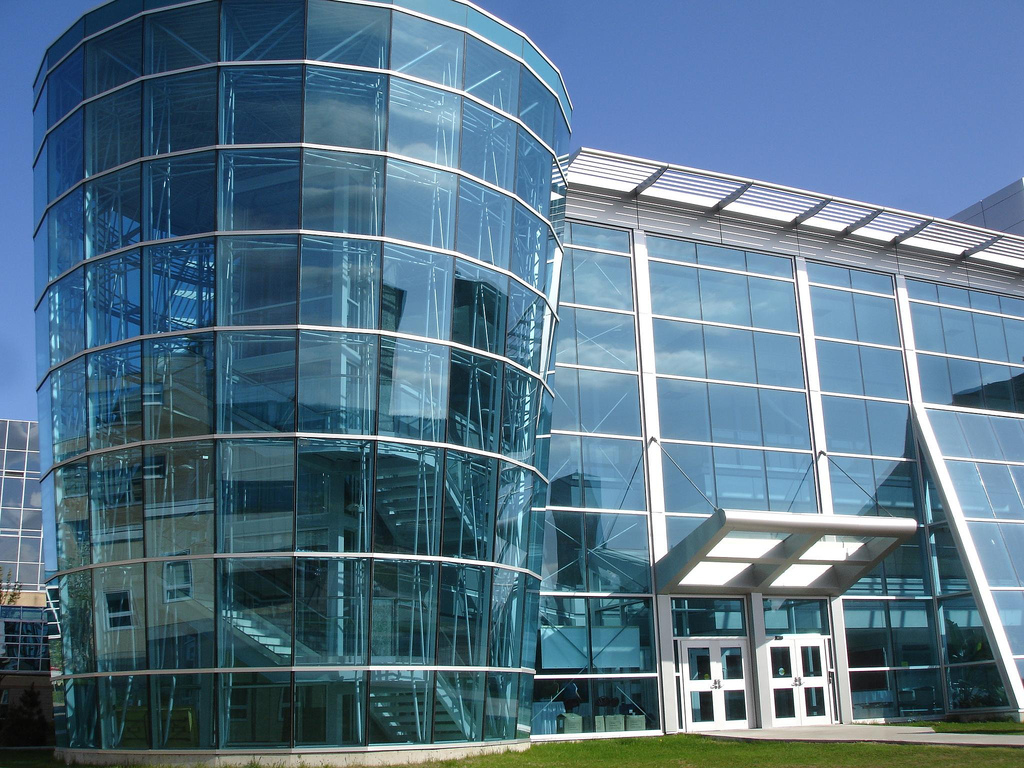
If a location can be viewed from the outside, there is no concern for yichud.

In a location of business, a male and female may be together for business purposes provided that the location where they are has the potential to be viewed from outside. Otherwise, the door has to be unlocked or people with a key allowed to come in unexpectedly. This applies also if they have separate rooms in the same office. A close working relationship excludes the possibility of relying solely on Baaloh B'ir. A man may temporarily be secluded with three women, but not on the basis of a permanent relationship. Two men who are prutzim (fail to keep the laws of tznius) are not allowed to work with two women. Neither may a woman work together with three non-Jewish men.

A male teacher should take heed that he does not become overly familiar with the girls. A male teacher who is single should not teach young children of either sex, since he may associate with their mothers when they come and pick up their children. In schools with many staff members, however, one may be lenient, and some poskim take the position that this halacha applies only to situations where the teaching takes place in the private home of the teacher.

== See also ==
- Jewish view of marriage
- Negiah (guidelines for physical contact)
- Niddah (menstruation laws)
- Rebbetzin (rabbi's wife)
- Role of women in Judaism
- Shalom Bayit (peace and harmony in the relationship between husband and wife)
- Shidduch (finding a marriage partner)
- Tzniut (modest behavior)
- Billy Graham rule (similar practice of some Christians)
- Khilwa (similar prohibition in Islamic law)
