= Basic Korean Dictionary =

Online learner's dictionary of the Korean language

- Hangul: 한국어기초사전
- Hanja: 韓國語基礎辭典
- RR: Hangugeo gicho sajeon
- MR: Han'gugŏ kich'o sajŏn
- IPA: [han.ɡu.ɡʌ.ɡi.tɕʰo.sa.dʑʌn]

Basic Korean Dictionary (Korean: 한국어기초사전; Hanja: 韓國語基礎辭典) is an online learner's dictionary of the Korean language, launched on 5 October 2016 by the National Institute of Korean Language. It consists of one monolingual and ten bilingual dictionaries that provide meanings of Korean words and expressions in Korean, English, Arabic, French, Indonesian, Japanese, Mongolian, Russian, Spanish, Thai, and Vietnamese.

== Multilingual support ==
- Korean: Basic Korean dictionary
- Korean–English: Korean–English Learners' Dictionary
- Korean–Arabic: قاموس تعليم اللغة الكورية والعربية
- Korean–French: Dictionnaire d'apprentissage coréen–français
- Korean–Indonesian: Kamus Pelajaran Bahasa Korea–Bahasa Indonesia
- Korean–Japanese: 韓国語–日本語学習辞典
- Korean–Mongolian: Солонгос–Монгол сургалтын толь бичиг
- Korean–Russian: Корейско–русский учебный словарь
- Korean–Spanish: Diccionario Didáctico Coreano–Español
- Korean–Thai: พจนานุกรมสำหรับผู้เรียนภาษาเกาหลี–ไทย
- Korean–Vietnamese: Từ điển học tiếng Hàn–tiếng Việt của

== See also ==
- Standard Korean Language Dictionary
