= Urimalsaem =

Online open source Korean dictionary

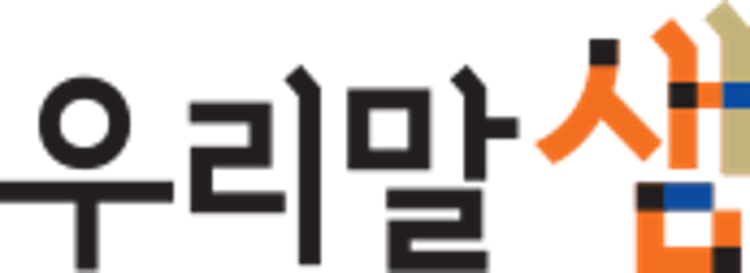
- Available in: Korean
- Founded: October 5, 2016
- Country of origin: South Korea
- Owner: National Institute of Korean Language
- Website: opendict.korean.go.kr (in Korean)
- Commercial: no

Urimalsaem (Korean: 우리말샘) is an online open source Korean language dictionary. It was launched on October 5, 2016, with an initial set of 1,109,722 headwords. It aims to capture neologisms (new words), jargon, colloquial expressions, and words specific to dialects. It is owned and operated by the South Korean government agency National Institute of Korean Language (NIKL), but anyone may contribute.

== Description ==
Urimalsaem is an online, open source, and collaborative Korean language dictionary. While any user can edit the dictionary, registered users review proposed edits before they are displayed on the website. Reviewers are generally lexicographers or linguists, who not only approve words, but remove duplicate definitions and formalize terms. This differentiates it from the similar Naver Open Dictionary (NOD), which allows for multiple duplicate entries with casual definitions, like the Western website Urban Dictionary.

All of its content, unless otherwise specified, is offered under the Creative Commons license Attribution-ShareAlike 2.0 Korea (CC BY-SA 2.0 KR), which allows for all use, including commercial, although attribution is required even if the material is transformed.

== History and analysis ==
It was launched on October 5, 2016, with an initial set of 1,109,722 headwords. One reason it was created is to better capture neologisms (new words), jargon, colloquial expressions, and words specific to dialects. Previously, this kind of information was captured using an automatic tool that analyzed news articles, but the tool had relatively low accuracy and numerous false positives.

Data and user behavior on the website has been studied. A 2020 study that examined neologisms from the years 2005–2009, as well as 2018, found that Urimalsaem was best able to capture neologisms when compared to the NOD, Standard Korean Language Dictionary (SKLD), and the Korea University Korean Dictionary (KUKD) for all years except 2006. Urimalsaem even uniquely captured terms like "Pence-rule" (펜스 룰), referring to a controversial statement U.S. Vice President Mike Pence made about not being alone with a woman so that one can avoid false accusations of sexual harassment.

Urimalsaem is relatively unique among Korean dictionaries (even when compared to Naver Open Dictionary) in how many North Korean and archaic words that it captures.

== See also ==
- Standard Korean Language Dictionary – South Korea's standardized spellings in Korean
- Seoul Foreign Language Spelling Dictionary, another online resource for the Korean language
