= Shlomo Rechnitz =

American businessman

- Born: Los Angeles, California
- Occupations: Owner of TwinMed LLC and Brius Healthcare Services

Shlomo Yehuda Rechnitz is an American businessman and philanthropist. He is the founder of TwinMed and owner of Brius Healthcare Services.

== Early life and education ==
Shlomo Rechnitz attended high school at the Mesivta of Long Beach, New York and then went to the Mir Yeshiva in Israel.

== Career ==
In 1998, Rechnitz incorporated TwinMed in Los Angeles with his twin brother, Steve Rechnitz. Based in Santa Fe Springs, California. TwinMed distributes medical supplies to nursing homes and hospitals in the United States from warehouses in California, Texas, Illinois, Ohio, Florida and New Jersey. In 2006, Rechnitz bought his first nursing home in Gardena, California. Rechnitz is also the owner of Brius Healthcare Services, the largest for-profit nursing home provider in California. Rechnitz runs over 80 facilities in California, Nevada, and Texas.

== Controversies ==
=== Brius Healthcare ===
Brius Healthcare has for years been questioned by state regulators, prosecutors, and plaintiffs’ attorneys about its business practices and quality of care. Staffing levels and health and safety ratings at dozens of the homes in recent years have fallen below the state average, federal data shows, with many lawsuits alleging poor patient care. Brius facilities have been investigated repeatedly for patient suicides and unsafe working environments. In 2014, 23 nursing homes owned by Rechnitz received a total of 50 serious deficiencies graded G or higher by the federal government, nearly triple the state average, according to a Sacramento Bee investigation. In October 2015 the FBI raided one of his facilities, the Alta Vista Healthcare & Wellness Centre, in Riverside, California, "seeking evidence in relation to alleged criminal activity." By 2016, state regulators denied operating licenses for five facilities the Brius network had acquired. In a letter to Rechnitz, regulators cited more than 370 higher-level state and federal health and safety violations at Brius homes from 2013 to 2016.

Rechnitz has come under fire for using the billions of dollars received in Medicaid and Medicare payments to overpay related companies – companies they or their family members partially or wholly own – for goods, service, and rent instead of relying upon outside vendors. Brius homes pay about 40 percent more per bed on average to related parties than other for-profit nursing homes in California. According to the 2014–2015 state filings, over $4.6 million was paid to companies associated with Rechnitz, including more than $3.5 million in lease payments on five properties. This all occurred at the same time as the company was trying to close the nursing homes claiming a loss of nearly $1.5 million. In 2018, the most recent year data is available for comparison, Brius homes paid more than $100 million to dozens of related parties for everything from medical supplies to rent. A California state auditor who reviewed Brius said most related-party transactions were properly disclosed and the expenses did not increase costs for Medi-Cal.

=== Statements on Jewish life ===
- In August 2014 he made the claim there was a shidduch "catastrophe" in the Haredi world, where large numbers of young women were unable to find marriage partners.
- In January 2016 he accused the Haredi community in Lakewood, New Jersey of developing “an elitist attitude, an ugly superiority complex" and acting in a way that borders on “bloodshed.” Its educational institutions, said Rechnitz, begin selecting children at a young age, and the rabbis and the community turn their backs on those who are not “good enough” or “not really worthy.” Children are left at home for weeks and months after being rejected by Haredi schools. Rechnitz promised to build more inclusive schools.
- In October 2017 he called the Open Orthodox movement "fake Jews," a "threat to all of Israel," and a "new religion" jeopardizing Judaism. During the same speech he attacked liberal elements in Israel and the United States, including Women of the Wall and the protest movement against President Donald Trump.

== Philanthropy and community work ==
Rechnitz oversees the Shlomo & Tamar Rechnitz Charitable Foundation which distributes funds to over 1,100 institutions yearly. He is known in the Los Angeles area for opening his home every Saturday night to listen to the needy and hand out charity. Rechnitz donated $5 million to support the Mir Yeshiva.

Rechnitz has composed, recorded and released four albums, which go by the names Shir, Shir 2, Shir 3, and Matana Tova, featuring a variety of notable Jewish singers. The singers appeared pro bono and proceeds from album sales supported charities, including Keren Hashviis' mission to assist shmita-observant farmers.

In December 2011, Rechnitz purchased a creditor's note against Chabad of California's headquarters in Westwood for $2.35 million in order to help the organization avoid foreclosure. After Hurricane Sandy, Rechnitz said he gave $1 million to aid in the rebuilding of Orthodox Jewish day schools and to assist the families whose children attend those schools.

In 2012 Rechnitz heard about Diane Aulger, a mother-of-five in North Texas that had her labor induced a few weeks early so that her husband could meet their daughter before he died from pulmonary fibrosis. Upon hearing the story, Rechnitz personally phoned Augler himself and sent her $20,000. In the autumn of 2014 Shlomo pledged $2.5 million to the Lakewood Cheder School's building campaign.

In June 2015, Rechnitz donated $250,000 to restore the Mount Zion Cemetery in East Los Angeles.

In November 2015, while on a layover in Shannon Airport in Ireland, Rechnitz purchased hot meals for 400 US troops when he saw they were sitting on the floor eating lunches out of paper bags while other passengers dined at airport restaurants. He expressed his appreciation for their service and gave them each $50 ($20,000 total), telling them he'd take it off his taxes.

In January 2016 it was reported that Rechnitz had purchased 18,000 Powerball tickets for his employees, and that one of his employees had received a winning ticket. While he did indeed buy and distribute 18,000 tickets, the employee had been tricked by her son into thinking she had won. Rechnitz then offered the family a paid vacation.

=== Honors and awards ===
Shlomo Rechnitz is the President of Torath Emeth and he is the first chairman of the board for the Chofetz Chaim Heritage Foundation. On August 1, 2012, Rechnitz was the master of ceremonies of the 12th Siyum HaShas event at the MetLife Stadium in New Jersey. The event attracted more than 90,000 people and celebrated the conclusion of the 7 1/2-year learning cycle of the Babylonian Talmud.

== Personal life ==
Shlomo Rechnitz is married to Tamar Rechnitz (née Belsky, daughter of Rabbi Yisroel Belsky).
