= SawYouAtSinai =

Dating website for Orthodox Jews

SawYouAtSinai is an online dating website for Orthodox Jews. It was one of the first Jewish-focused dating websites.

SawYouAtSinai.com (SYAS) was founded by Pittsburgh-based shadchan (Jewish matchmaker) Tova Weinberg and Marc Goldmann in December 2003, one of the first Jewish dating websites. SYAS combines the traditional shidduch process with the Internet. Members fill out a questionnaire detailing level of religious observance. A cadre of approximately 365 volunteer matchmakers, who are married and devote at least 6 hours per week to SYAS, look through profiles on the website and recommend matches to their clients. When a marriage is successful arranged, the clients pay a fee, usually $2,000, directly to the matchmaker.

By 2007, the site claimed 420 successful matches since launch. As of 2013, SYAS had more than 30,000 users and facilitated approximately 1,000 marriages. The site's success led Goldmann and Alan Cutter to expand the SYAS formula to other groups such as non-Orthodox Jews, Mormons, and South Asians.
