= Offering (Christianity) =

Gift of money to the Church

The collection of tithes and offerings during the offering of an Evangelical-Lutheran Mass at Vadstena Abbey Church in Sweden

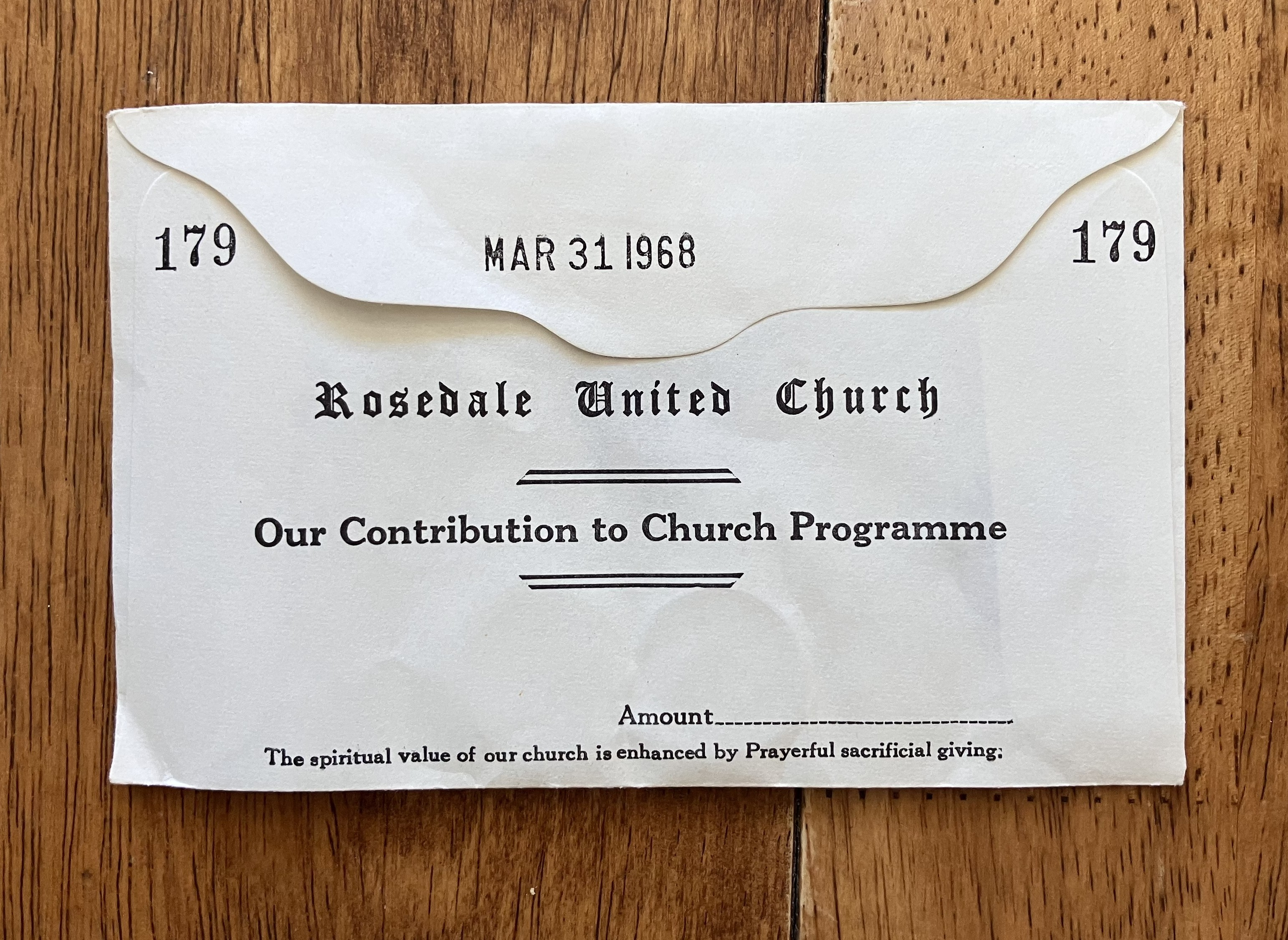
An offering envelope used in the United Church of Canada. Many Christian denominations offer envelopes for members to donate money to their church.

The offering in Christianity is a gift of money to the Church.

In general, the offering is differentiated from the tithe as being funds given by members for general purposes over and above what would constitute a tithe.

In some Christian services, there is a part reserved for the collection of donations that is referred to as the offertory. Historically, the offertory takes place either in the middle of the service (or at the end) and is collected by passing a collection plate (which may be fancy, or simple). Other churches collect donations by placing a collection box reserved for that purpose (usually near the exit doors). More recently, donations are collected by electronic means, either as one-time or recurring items. The offering goes towards upkeep of the church building, various ministries such as that of evangelism, as well as to the poor, among other areas.

== History ==
=== Old Testament ===
In the Bible, the offering is an act of gratitude to God. At the time of Moses, God gave certain prescriptions to the people of Israel. In particular, they were to bring God some of their wealth by way of gratitude for the land that God had given for inheritance. The offerings were largely agricultural products: wheat, barley, oil, animals and the amount was one-tenth of their income, the tithe.

=== New Testament ===
In the New Testament, especially in the Epistle to the Galatians in chapter 6, Paul of Tarsus reminds the believers' commitment to their pastor and the poor. In this same book, the offering is compared to a seed. These concepts are echoed in the Second Epistle to the Corinthians chapter 9. The motivation of the donor is no longer an obligation, but must be a free choice of generosity. Paul of Tarsus has made several collections in order to help people in need. Moreover, the offering is presented as a support for the mission and a sign of compassion for the poor.

== Methods ==
=== Offering in kind ===
Some members of a church offer goods and services to a church in place of money. This could include donating food, toiletries, or other goods necessary for the upkeep of the church building. Additionally, church members could donate equivalent free services such as construction, food prep, or mechanical maintenance.

=== Offering in cash ===
==== Offering plate ====
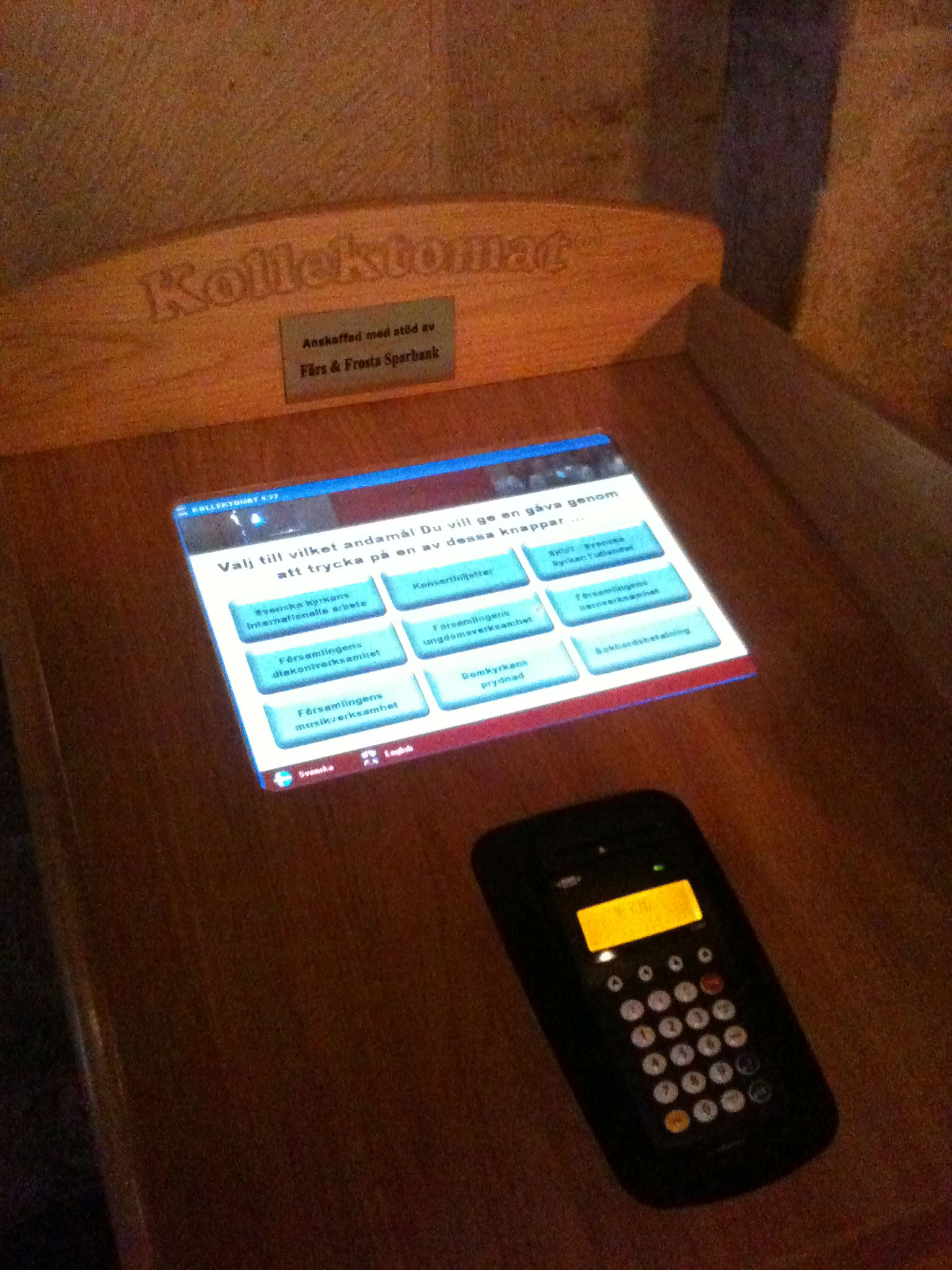
A payment terminal at the Lund Cathedral, Sweden.

Historically, it was collected in an offering plate/dish, a basket, or a alms box. New methods have been used in the 21st century, such as a payment terminal or a connected shopping cart.

In evangelical Christian churches, the usage of internet payment and mobile payment is increasing.

=== Tithing ===
Tithing can be considered as a form of offering.

== Use ==
The offering is put at the service of the Church, for example for the support of the ministers of God, Pastors and missionaries, building maintenance costs, programs, helping the underprivileged (Christian humanitarian aid). For the affiliated churches, the offering also supports the services of their denomination (such as missionary organizations, hospitals, schools and theological institutes). According to a 2014 survey of 1,605 churches in the United States by Christianity Today, the top five expenditures are staff salaries (ministers) to 47%, the ministries and the support (Christian humanitarian aid) to 9%, the place of worship (mortgage or rent of the building to 7%, utilities to 7%, maintenance to 5%), the support for international missions at 5% and support for local missions at 4%. A 2016 study conducted by the Leadership Network and the Vanderbloemen Search Group among 1,252 churches in the United States, in Canada, in South Africa and in Great Britain, gave similar figures.

In 1948, the evangelist Billy Graham and his evangelistic team established the Modesto Manifesto, a code of ethics life and work to protect against accusations of financial, sexual and power abuse. This code includes rules for collecting offerings in churches, working only with churches supportive of cooperative evangelism, using official crowd estimates at outdoor events, and a commitment to never be alone with a woman other than his wife, unless another person is present.

== See also ==
- Church service
- Church attendance
- Christian liturgy
- Poor box
