= Standard Korean Language Dictionary =

Dictionary of the Korean language

- Editor: The National Academy of the Korean Language
- Language: Korean
- Subject: Dictionary
- Publisher: National Institute of Korean Language, Doosan Don-A
- Publication date: 9 October 1999
- Publication place: South Korea
- Pages: 7,328 (first edition)
- ISBN: 978-8-900-08422-1
- Website: https://stdict.korean.go.kr/main/main.do

Korean name
- Hangul: 표준국어대사전
- Hanja: 標準國語大辭典
- RR: Pyojun gugeo daesajeon
- MR: P'yojun kugŏ taesajŏn
- IPA: [pʰjo.dʑun.ɡu.ɡʌ.dɛ̝.sa.dʑʌn]

Standard Korean Language Dictionary (Korean: 표준국어대사전; lit. 'Standard National Language Unabridged Dictionary') is a dictionary of the Korean language, published by the National Institute of Korean Language.

== History ==
The compilation of Standard Korean Language Dictionary was commenced on 1 January 1992, by The National Academy of the Korean Language, the predecessor of the National Institute of Korean Language. The dictionary's first edition was published in three volumes on 9 October 1999, followed by the compact disc released on 9 October 2001. The online dictionary was launched on 9 October 2002, and revised on 9 October 2008.

== See also ==
- Basic Korean Dictionary
- Seoul Foreign Language Spelling Dictionary – standard spellings for Korean terms in English, Japanese, and Chinese
- Urimalsaem – an online open source Korean-language dictionary
