= Shidduch =

System of matchmaking in for Jewish singles

The Shidduch (Hebrew: שִׁדּוּךְ, pl. shidduchim שִׁדּוּכִים, Aramaic שידוכין shidduchin) is a system of matchmaking in which Jewish singles are introduced to one another in Orthodox Jewish communities for the purpose of marriage.

== The practice ==
In the past and until today in more conservative Orthodox Jewish circles, dating is limited to the search for a marriage partner. Both sides (usually the parents, close relatives or friends of the persons involved, and the singles themselves) make inquiries about the prospective partner (e.g., on his/her character, intelligence, level of learning, financial status, family and health status, appearance, and level of religious observance).

A shidduch often begins with a recommendation from family members, friends, or others who see matchmaking as a mitzvah, or commandment. Some engage in it as a profession and charge a fee for their services. Usually, a professional matchmaker is called a shadchan, but anyone who makes a shidduch is considered the shadchan for that shidduch.

After the match has been proposed, the prospective partners meet a number of times to gain a sense of whether they are right for one another. The number of dates prior to announcing an engagement may vary by community. In some, the dating continues several months. In stricter communities, the couple may decide a few days after originally meeting with each other. Also, the age when shidduchim start may vary by community. In frum circles, especially among Hasidim, eighteen is the age when shidduchim start and shadchanim take notice.

Those who support marriage by shidduch believe that it complies with traditional Judaism's outlook on Tzniut, modest behaviour in relations between men and women, and prevents promiscuity. It may also be helpful in small Jewish communities where meeting prospective marriage partners is limited, and this gives them access to a broader spectrum of potential candidates.

If the shidduch does not succeed, the shadchan is usually contacted and tells the other side that the arrangement will not be going ahead. If the shidduch is successful, the couple informs the shadchan of its success.

In recent years, a number of shidduchim sites have appeared on the Internet.

== Bashow ==
The prospective partners either date each other, or, in stricter Haredi communities, they go to a "bashow", or sit-in. The practice has been called "a chaperoned quasi-date".

A typical bashow scene is that the young man, with his parents, goes to see the young woman in her house (or that of someone hosting), to see if the prospective couple are compatible. Both sets of parents talk to each other, and then, when the setting is more relaxed, they go into another room, leaving the man and woman in the living room to speak between themselves. Some use this opportunity to actually ask each other pertinent questions, while some just want to see if they like each other, relying more on the information they got from the shadchen or from other people. The number of bashows prior to announcing an engagement varies, as some have many bashows, while others have as few as one, which is typical among the children of Hasidic Rebbes.

== Bashert ==
Bashert (or beshert; Yiddish: באַשערט) means "destiny". (Compare Middle High German beschern: “to preordain, destine, allot, distribute”. Compare also German beschert, meaning "bestowed" or "given". Others insist that it comes from the Yiddish sher meaning "scissors" or "shears"; this etymology is less likely.) It is often used to refer to one's divinely preordained spouse or soulmate, who is called one's basherte (female) or basherter (male). It can also be used to express the seeming fate or destiny of an auspicious or important event, friendship, or happening.

In modern usage, Jewish singles will say that they are looking for their bashert, meaning they are looking for that person who will complement them perfectly, and whom they will complement perfectly. Since it is considered to have been Heavenly preordained whom one will marry, one's spouse is considered to be one's bashert by definition, independent of whether the couple's marital life works out well or not.

=== Zivug ===
A somewhat related word is zivug. The word includes the letters for the Hebrew word zug, pair; the transliteration subsets/matches too. God has pleasure also with the Yichudim of Jewish couple: Shekhinah is present with union ... the "wedding". All desire may be for God, and all pleasures come from "divine spiritual source".

== Biblical matchmaking ==
The first recorded shidduch in the Torah was the match that Eliezer, the servant of the Jewish patriarch Abraham, made for his master's son Isaac (Genesis Ch. 24). Abraham gave him specific instructions to choose a woman from Abraham's own tribe. Eliezer traveled to his master's homeland to fulfill Abraham's wishes, arriving at a well. After a short prayer to God for guidance, describing how a virtuous woman might act toward a traveling stranger at the well, Rebekah appeared on the scene, and did everything described in Eliezer's prayer. Eliezer then went with Rebekah to her family, and appealed to them for permission to take Rebekah back with him to be Isaac's wife. Once this permission was granted, Rebekah joined Eliezer on the road home to Isaac. Even so, Isaac gained his own impression of her before agreeing to marry her (Rashi, commentary to Genesis 24:67).

However, when Eliezer proposes to take Rebekah back to Isaac in Canaan, he is told by Rebekah's family: "Let us ask the maiden" (i. e., Rebekah). This is taken as an instruction for Jewish parents to weigh their child's opinion in the balance during an arranged marriage. Regardless of whether proper procedure is followed, this is not the end of the decision—it is believed by Jews that the final say belongs to God, who may have different plans (compare with the match of Jacob and Leah).

== Talmudic references ==
The Talmud (Bavli Kiddushin 12a, first version) states that academy head Abba Arikha would give corporal punishment to a man who would marry without shidduchin, that is, without prearrangement by the couple. The text gives three versions of his practice; the other two versions disagree. Some authorities rule according to the first version, while others rule according to the other two versions.

In Kiddushin 41a, it states that a man should not marry a woman he has not seen, lest he come to violate "love your neighbour as yourself".

The etymology of the words "shidduch" and "shadchan" is uncertain. The medieval rabbi Nissim of Gerona (commonly called Ran) traces it to the Aramaic word for "calm" (cf. Targum to the Book of Judges 5:31), and elaborates that the main purpose of the shidduch process is for young people to "settle down" into marriage. According to Jastrow, the word means to "negotiate" or "stipulate" (the financial terms of a betrothal).

== Shadchan ==
Shadchan (Hebrew: שַׁדְּכָן, plural שַׁדְּכֳנִם shadchanim, female שַׁדְכָנִית shadchanit, is a Hebrew word for matchmaker; Yiddish: Shadkhn.

The word shadchan refers to people who carry out shidduchim as a profession within the religious Jewish community. However, shadchan can also be used to refer to anyone who introduces two single Jews to one another with the hope that they will form a couple.

One of the characters in the musical Fiddler on the Roof is a matchmaker named Yente. Because of this, the name Yenta (יענטע) is sometimes mistakenly taken to be a synonym for shadchan.

=== Shadchanus gelt ===
Shadchanus (שדכנות) is the money (Yiddish: געלט, gelt) paid to the party/parties who brokered a successful pairing. It is a brokerage fee, not a gift, and cannot be paid from funds intended for charity (מַעֲשֵׂר maaser). Usually it is paid by the parents, and it is common that each pays an equal amount.

== Bat-Kohen ==
Although Torah law allows for a bat-kohen to marry a challal, convert, or freed slave (Hebrew eved meshukhrar), the Midrash and Talmud cite Johanan bar Nappaha's view that a daughter of the kohen is best off marrying a kohen. Rabbi Yochanan maintains that in the event a bat-kohen marries a non-Kohen, undesired results for the groom are likely to surface, such as poverty or the demise of the groom. An exception to this taboo is if the groom is a Talmid Chacham.

== Medical aspects ==
Considering the prevalence of a number of genetic diseases in both the Ashkenazi and Sephardi communities, several organisations (most notably Dor Yeshorim) routinely screen large groups of young people anonymously, only handing them a telephone number and a PIN. When a shidduch is suggested, the candidates can phone the organisation, enter both their PINs, and find out whether their union could result in critically disabled children. Although the implementation has been controversial, there has been a sharp decrease in the number of children born with Tay–Sachs disease and other genetic disorders since its inception.

== Notable shadchonim ==
- Tova Weinberg
- Aleeza Ben Shalom

== See also ==
- Jewish views on marriage
- Jewish wedding
- Negiah (guidelines for physical contact)
- Niddah (menstruation laws)
- Segula (Kabbalah)
- Shidduch crisis
- Shalom bayit (peace and harmony in the relationship between husband and wife)
- Yichud (prohibitions of secluding oneself with a stranger)

== Books ==
- Shani Stein. "The Survival Guide to Shidduchim". New York, NY: Feldheim publishers, 1997. ISBN 1-56871-132-8.
- Leah Jacobs, Shaindy Mark. "Shidduch Secrets". Shaar Press, 2006. ISBN 1-4226-0220-6.
