= Avraham Bromberg =

American Rabbi & Rosh Yeshiva

Rabbi Avraham Dov Halevi Bromberg Shlit"a
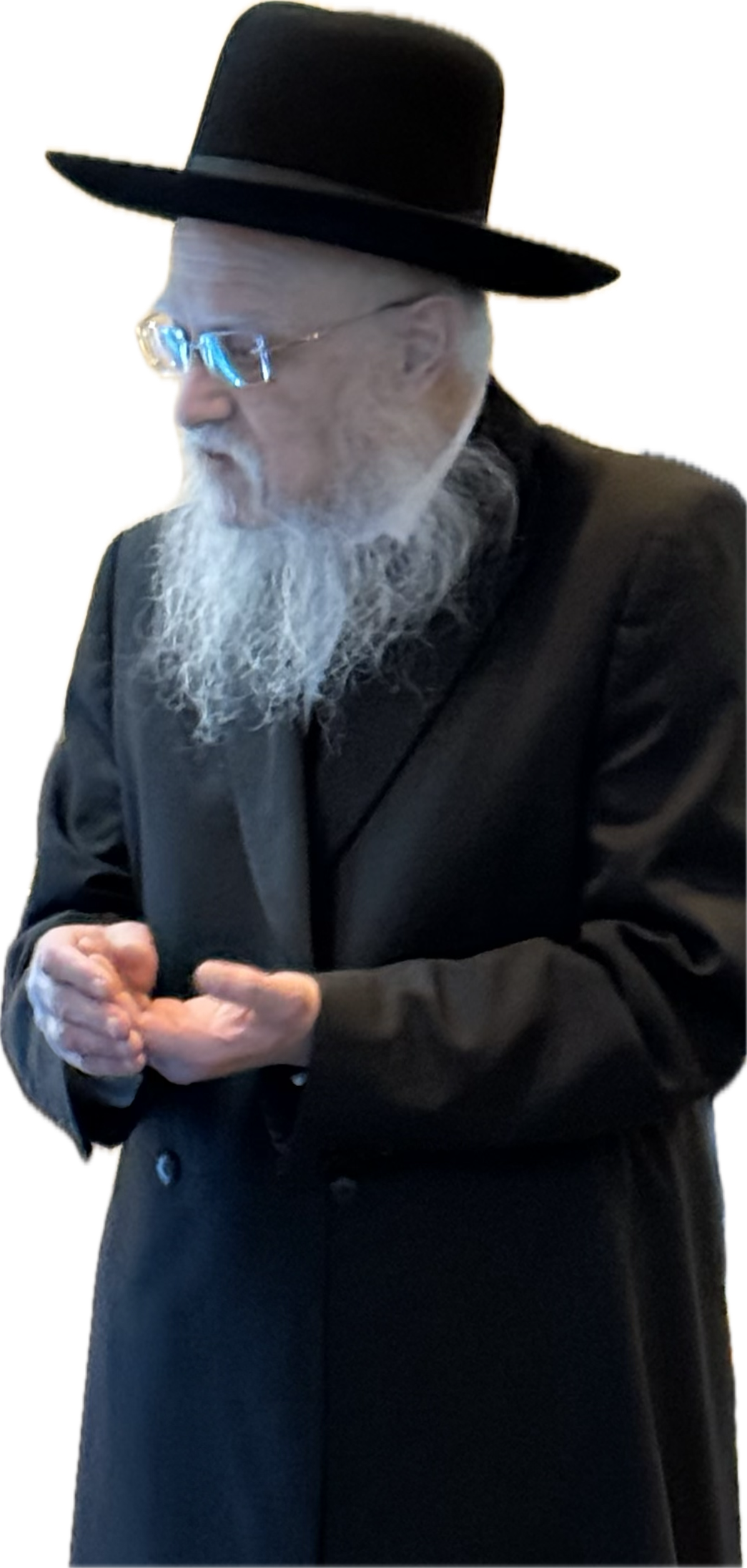
- Title: Rav Avremel Bromberg

Personal life
- Born: Avraham Dov Halevi Bromberg Brooklyn, New York
- Spouse: Chana Zeilberger
- Children: Yisrael Chaim; Yeruchem; Moshe; Aryeh Leib; Yaakov; Yechiel; Yehuda; Eliezer; Four Modest Daughters
- Parent: Rabbi Yona Bromberg
- Education: Beth Hatalmud Rabbinical College

Religious life
- Religion: Judaism
- Denomination: Haredi Judaism
- Yeshiva: Sha'ar Hatalmud
- Position: Rosh Yeshiva
- Residence: Lakewood Township, New Jersey

Rabbi Avraham Dov Halevi Bromberg, formerly the Rosh Yeshiva of Beth Hatalmud Rabbinical College, is currently Rosh Yeshiva of Sha'ar Hatalmud in Lakewood Township, New Jersey. In 2022, the Yeshiva relocated to Cherry Hill, New Jersey. He is a Talmudic scholar and Posek in the U.S. Yeshiva community.

Rabbi Bromberg affixing a Biblically mandated gate on his porch.

In 2002, Bromberg authored a Rabbinical responsa to permit an agunah, whose husband perished in the September 11 attacks, to remarry. One of the Halakhic justifications was based on Boruch Ber Leibowitz's Birkhas Shmuel. Bromberg has also published numerous essays on assorted Talmudic topics in various scholarly journals, including Yeshurun, Chitzei Gibborim, and Am HaTorah.

In 2010, Bromberg was one of the signatories of a letter urging members of the Haredi community to marry people who are close in age to themselves. This was meant to help end the Shidduch Crisis. To further combat this issue, Bromberg also signed a letter allowing boys to start dating at a younger age than most Haredim are accustomed to.

In 2021, following the legalization of Cannabis in New Jersey, an open letter was written by many rabbis and Rosh Yeshivas in the Lakewood area, banning the use and sale of Cannabis by people in the Haredi community. Bromberg penned a postscript to the letter harshly decrying all those who use and sell cannabis, and calling for their ouster from the community. He signed as "He who writes and signs for the sake of the survival of the human race and Judaism".
