= Seclusion =

Act of isolating from society

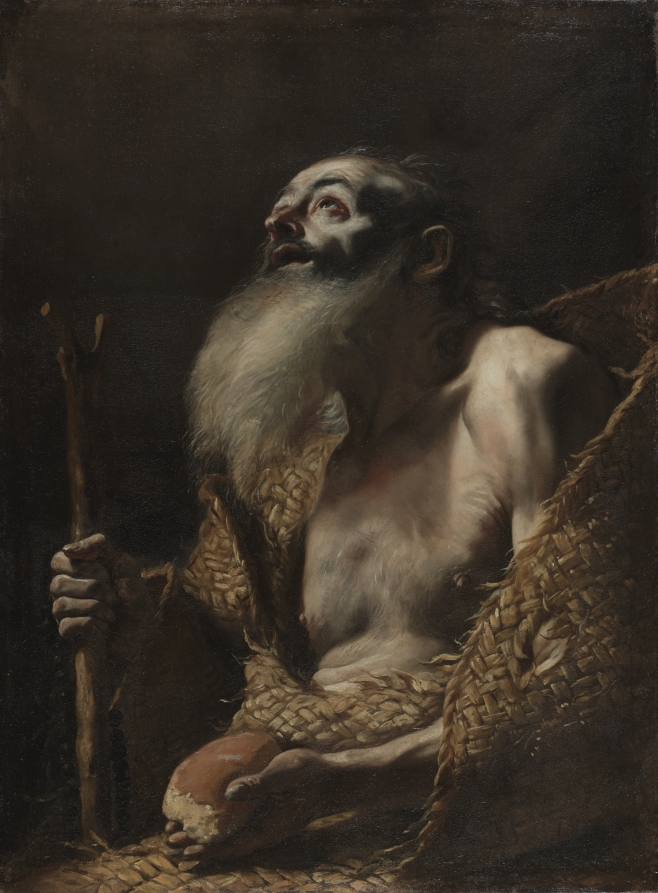
Representation of Paul of Thebes, known in the Catholic and Coptic Church as the first saint to live a secluded life

Seclusion is the act of secluding (i.e. isolating from society), the state of being secluded, or a place that facilitates it (a secluded place). A person, couple, or larger group may go to a secluded place for privacy or peace and quiet. The seclusion of an individual is called solitude.

== Restrictions on the seclusion of a man and a woman ==
In some cases where there are legal, religious or social restrictions on two people having physical intimacy, there may be restrictions on being together in a secluded place. For example, under traditional schools of sharia or Islamic law, a man and a woman who are not married and not mahram, may be forbidden to be together in a house, a bathroom, or a secluded place. A man and woman could be in a secluded area for work purposes, just talking, or anything that does not allow them to pass their limits. See also yichud—a similar rule in Judaism.

== As a therapy ==
Seclusion may be used as a control tactic in psychological treatment settings. Seclusion of an agitated person in a quiet room free of stimulation may help de-escalate a situation which may be dangerous to the agitated person or those around them.

In relation to administering medications, seclusion is a tactic devised for non-compliant patients. Methods used to restrict the freedom of such patients include medication (including chemical restraint), physical restraint, and behavioral therapy.

Seclusion must only be used in the best interest of the patient, it must only be used as a last resort method, and it must not be prolonged as a form of punishment on the patient. When it is otherwise used, it may be considered a form of solitary confinement. In Ireland, The Mental Health Commission governs seclusion in psychiatric institutions. The act states that people can only be placed in seclusion if

- it prevents them from hurting themselves and/or others
- and it complies with the rules set out by the commission.

To prevent contagious disease transmission self-isolation is used as a public health measure.
