= Tzniut =

Modesty and discretion, as well as a group of Jewish laws pertaining to conduct

Tzniut (Hebrew: צְנִיעוּת ṣənī‘ūt, Sephardi: seni‘ut, Ashkenazi: tznius; "modesty" or "privacy"; Yiddish: באשיידנקייט basheydnkeyt) describes the character trait of modesty and discretion, as well as a group of Jewish laws pertaining to conduct. The concept is most important within Orthodox Judaism.

== Description ==
Tzniut includes a group of Jewish laws concerned with modesty of both dress and behavior. In the Babylonian Talmud, Rabbi Elazar Bar Tzadok interprets the injunction at Micah 6:8 to "go discreetly with your God" as referring to discretion in conducting funerals and weddings. The Talmud then extends his interpretation: "If in matters that are generally performed in public, such as funerals and weddings, the Torah instructed us to go discreetly, matters that by their very nature should be performed discreetly, such as giving charity to a poor person, how much more so must one take care to do them discreetly, without publicity and fanfare".

In the legal dimension of Orthodox Judaism, the issue of tzniut is discussed in more technical terms: how much skin may a person expose, and so on. These details underscore the concept of tzniut as a code of conduct, character, and awareness, which in practice is more noticeable among women than men.

== Dress ==
=== Gender-specific garb ===
Originating from the Biblical pair of commands (Deut. 22:5) regarding "male and female garb." Aside from pants and zippers, there is also the matter of buttons on clothing. Classic clothing has the button on the left side for women and on the right side for men. Some Jews reverse that, with men buttoning right on the left as part of Tzniut. The principal guiding point of tzniut regarding dress is that a Jew should not dress in ways that attract undue attention. That does not mean dressing poorly but means neither men nor women should dress in a way that over-emphasizes their physical appearance or attracts undue attention. There are many different interpretations of tzniut and so people from different communities dress differently.

=== Community-specific garb ===
Orthodox Judaism requires both men and women to cover their bodies substantially. According to many opinions, that involves covering the elbows and knees.

In Haredi communities, men wear long trousers and usually long-sleeved shirts; most will not wear short sleeves at all. Haredi Ashkenazi practice discourages sandals without socks both inside and outside the synagogue, but Haredi Sefardi communities tend to permit sandals at least outside of synagogue. Dress inside a synagogue and, according to many, in public, should be comparable with that worn by the community when it meets royalty or the government.

Haredi women wear blouses covering the elbow and collarbone and skirts covering the knees while standing and sitting. The ideal sleeve and skirt length varies by community. Some women try not to follow fashion, but others wear fashionable but modest clothing. Haredi women avoid skirts with slits but prefer kick pleats. They also avoid overly eye-catching colors, especially red, as well as tight clothing. The prohibition on wearing red is Ashkenazic, originally formulated by Joseph Colon Trabotto, Moses Isserles, and Shabtai HaKohen. In modern interpretation, Moshe Feinstein restricts the prohibition to women, but many other authorities apply it to both genders. Many will wear only closed-toe shoes and always wear stockings or tights, the thickness of which varies by community.

Modern Orthodox women also usually adhere to tzniut and dress in a modest fashion (as compared to general society), but their communal definition does not necessarily include covering their elbows, collarbones, or knees, and may allow for wearing pants although most Modern Orthodox women will, when in front of men or in public, wear skirts that cover their knees, preferably loose ones, and cover their shoulders and cleavage.

Modern Orthodox men's dress is often indistinguishable from their non-Orthodox peers, apart from them wearing a skullcap. They may wear short-sleeved shirts, and sometimes even shorts. Sandals without socks are generally not worn in a synagogue but are usually accepted in Modern Orthodox and Religious Zionist communities in Israel for daily dress for both men and women.

Conservative Judaism formally encourages modest dress. While day-to-day dress often simply reflects trends in wider society, many Conservative synagogues expect somewhat more modest dress (although not necessarily as stringent as in Orthodox Judaism) for synagogue attendance, and may have specific dress requirements to receive synagogue honors (such as being called for a Torah reading).

Reform Judaism has no religious dress requirements.

The style of dress also involves cultural considerations aside from religious requirements. Members of Conservative and Reform synagogues may abide by dress codes generally ranging from business casual to informal. There are many Orthodox synagogues (especially in Israel) in which dress, while meeting religious modesty requirements, is quite casual. Many Haredi and Hasidic communities have special customs and styles of dress that serve to identify members of their communities but regard those special dress features as more customary to their particular communities than a general religious requirement expected of all observant Jews.

Further cultural considerations include the increasing use of modest dress as an act of female empowerment and self-actualization, which are not directly related to religious observance.

== Head covering ==
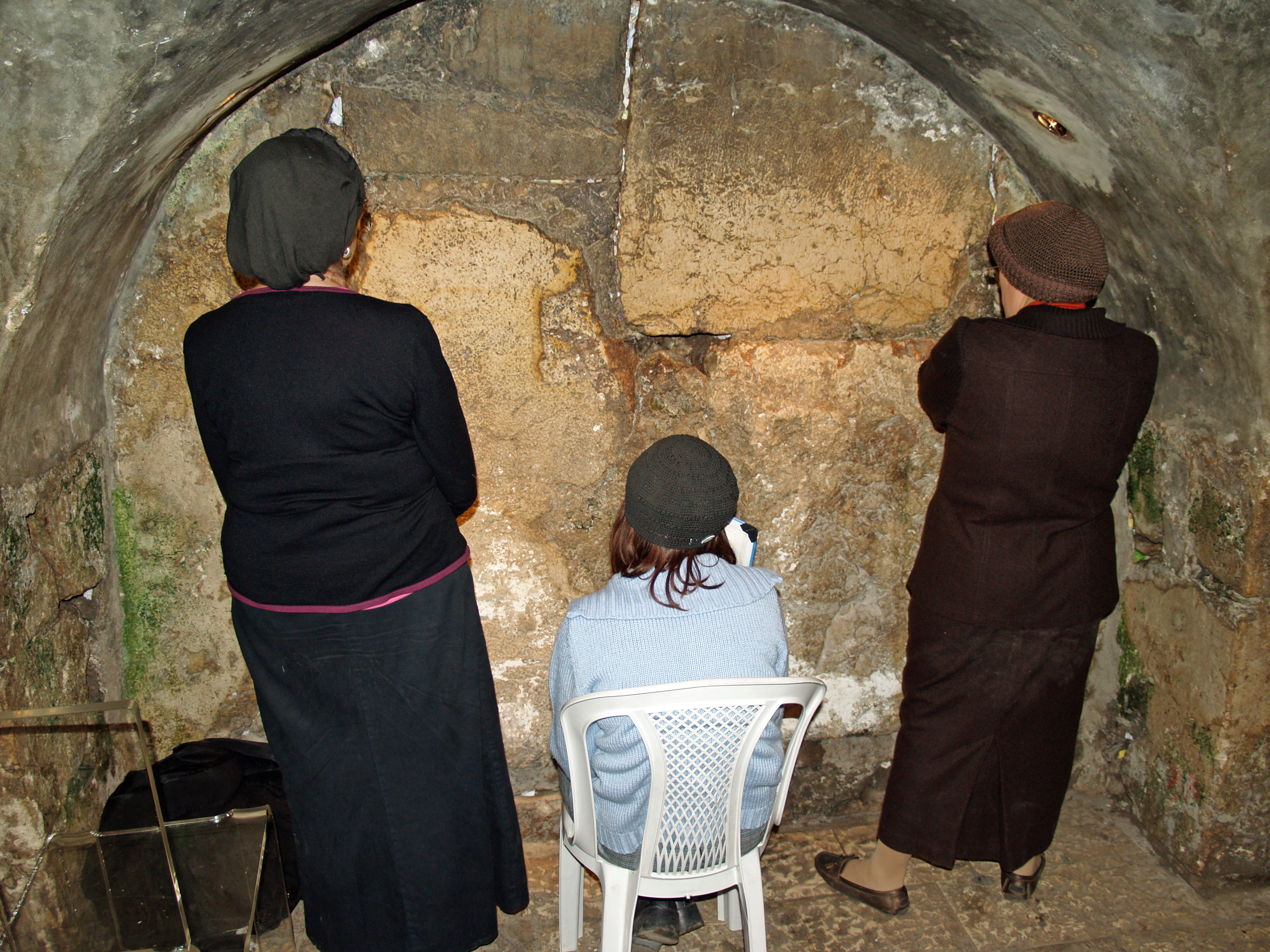
Three styles of hair covering that are common among married Orthodox Jewish women. From left to right: snood, fall, and hat.

Jewish law governing tzniut requires married women to cover their hair outside the home when in the presence of men other than their husband or close family members. Such covering (known as the tichel or mitpachat) is common practice among Orthodox Jewish women.

During the time of Moses, the Bible records that it was normative for women to wear a head covering (cf. Numbers 5:18). In Numbers 5:18, the sotah (meaning "one who goes astray") ritual, in which the head of a woman accused of adultery is uncovered (made parua), is explicated, implying that normally a woman's head is covered; the Talmud thus teaches that the Torah (Pentateuch) commands women to go out in public with their heads covered. This headcovering worn during biblical times was a veil or headscarf.

In the Old Testament's Book of Daniel, Susanna wore a headcovering and wicked men demanded that it be removed so that they might lust after her (cf. Susanna 13:31–33). Genesis 24:64–65 records that Rebecca, while traveling to meet Isaac, "did not flaunt her physical beauty" but "veiled herself, increasing her allure through an outward display of modesty." The removal of a woman's veil in the passage of Isaiah 47:1–3 is linked with nakedness and shame. The biblical book Song of Songs records "the erotic nature of hair from the verse, 'Your hair is as a flock of goats' (Song of Songs, 4:1), i.e., from a verse praising her beauty." Jewish law has stipulated that a married woman who uncovered her hair in public evidenced her infidelity.

== Female singing voice ==
=== Orthodox Judaism ===
In Orthodox Judaism, unrelated men are generally not allowed to hear women sing, a prohibition called kol isha (literally "a woman's voice"). The Talmud classifies that as ervah (literally "nakedness"). The majority view of halakhic authorities is that the prohibition applies at all times and forbids a man from praying or studying the Torah in the presence of a woman who is singing; it is similar to other prohibitions classified as ervah. A minority view holds that the prohibition of praying or studying in the presence of kol isha applies only while the Shema Yisrael prayer is being recited.

There is a debate between poskim whether the prohibition applies to a recorded female voice if the singer cannot be seen, the woman is not known to the man who is listening, and he has never seen her or a picture of her. There are also opinions, following Samson Raphael Hirsch and Azriel Hildesheimer, that exclude singing in mixed groups from this prohibition, such as synagogue prayer or dinner-table zemirot, based on the idea that the female voice is not distinctly heard as separate from the group in those cases.

Yehiel Yaakov Weinberg and Rabbi David Bigman of Yeshivat Ma'ale Gilboa hold that the kol isha prohibition does not apply to women singing zemirot, songs to children, and lamentations for the dead because in those contexts, men do not derive sexual pleasure from the woman's voice. Rabbi Mosheh Lichtenstein of Yeshivat Har Etzion also rules that the kol isha prohibition does not apply to cases where the song is not sexual and the listener will not derive sexual desire.

=== Other denominations ===
Conservative Judaism interprets the relevant passage of the Talmud as expressing a rabbi's opinion, rather than imposing a requirement.

Reform Judaism fundamentally reconsidered the status of women within Judaism in a series of synods from 1837 onward in both Europe and the United States and formally abolished most distinctions between men and women in the observance of Jewish life, particularly concerning dress and public participation. It no longer regards that law as applicable to modern times.

== Touch ==
In Orthodox Judaism, men and women who are not married and not closely related are generally forbidden to touch each other sensually. A person who refrains from touching the opposite sex is said to be "shomer negiah". Any touching but especially in an affectionate manner ("b'derech chiba") is prohibited.

Opinions are divided regarding a quick handshake in a business setting: some authorities (mainly of Modern Orthodox background) permit it, but other people (nearly all Haredim, and many other Orthodox Jews) prohibit it. The question is, "What is sensual?" One may, however, touch certain relatives (parents, children, grandparents, grandchildren) to whom one is presumed not to be sexually attracted. Whether or not children adopted at a young age are included in the prohibition is a matter of dispute and varies from case to case. One may touch one's spouse outside the niddah period, but any married couples will also not publicly touch one another.

Conservative and Reform Judaism do not follow those laws.

== Yichud ==
In Orthodox Judaism, men and women who are not married to each other and are not immediate blood relatives are forbidden to enter into a secluded situation (yichud) in a room or area that is locked and private. That measure is taken to prevent the possibility of sexual relations, which are prohibited outside of marriage. According to some authorities, it applies even between adoptive parents and adoptive children over the age of maturity, but others are more lenient with children adopted from a young age. Seclusion does not consist of merely being alone in a room together, and it is only if the situation is private, with no one else expected to enter, that the restriction applies. Originally, the prohibition applied only to married women who were secluded with men other than their husbands, but it was later extended to include single women. According to the Talmud, the extension occurred in the time of King David, when his son Amnon raped his other son Absalom's sister, Tamar. On the issue of elevators, opinions vary; some allow yichud in an elevator for a time of no more than 30 seconds, but others forbid it under all circumstances, partly because of the possibility of an elevator getting stuck. The laws concerning yichud are complicated and detailed, and especially so for women in modern contexts, promoting the suggestion to reread them as a nonspecific mandate for personal space at a time that society can generally acknowledge the darkest aspects of the human sexual psyche in today's social interactions.

Conservative and Reform Judaism do not regard those rules as applicable.

== Synagogue services ==
In Orthodox Judaism, men and women are not allowed to mingle during prayer services, and Orthodox synagogues generally include a divider, a mechitza, to create separate men's and women's sections. The idea comes from the old Jewish practice when the Temple in Jerusalem stood: there was a women's balcony in the Ezrat Nashim to separate male and female spectators at the special Sukkot celebrations. There is also a prophecy in Zechariah (12:12) that mentions men and women mourning separately. The Talmud took that account and inferred that if men and women should be separate in times of mourning, they certainly should be separate in times of happiness.

Mechitzot are usually seen in Orthodox synagogues but never in Reform ones. Original German Reform synagogues had balconies although in modified form. While many Conservative synagogues also had balconies or separate seating for women in the past, most of them switched to "family seating" (mixed seating of relatives) in the 1960s. Today, the Conservative movement puts a strong emphasis on egalitarianism so that men and women have equal roles in prayer services. However, non-egalitarian services, separate seating, and the use of a mechitza are still considered valid options for Conservative congregations.

== Dancing ==
Orthodox Jews following the laws on negiah do not participate in mixed dancing, as it entails sensual touch and may also be considered immodest even if there is no physical contact.

In 2013, the Rabbinical Court of the Ashkenazi Community in the Haredi city of Beitar Illit ruled against Zumba (a type of dance fitness) classes although they were held with a female instructor and all-female participants. It stated: "Both in form and manner, the activity [Zumba] is entirely at odds with both the ways of the Torah and the holiness of Israel, as are the songs associated with it."

== Observance ==
There are several levels to the observance of physical and personal tzniut according to Orthodox Judaism, as derived from various sources in halakha. Observance of the rules varies from aspirational to mandatory to routine across the spectrum of Orthodox stricture and observance.

- Not dwelling on lascivious or immoral thoughts
- Not staring at members of the opposite sex, particularly any part of the opposite sex's "private" anatomy
- Keeping the majority of one's body covered in respectable clothing
- Avoiding the company of uncouth individuals or situations if an atmosphere of levity and depravity prevails
- Avoiding pictures or scenes that are likely to be sexually arousing
- Refraining from touching a person of the opposite sex
- Not looking at animals copulating
- Not hugging or kissing one's spouse in public; among Haredim, all physical contact is avoided between spouses in public. The primary reason is not to arouse jealousy and hence the evil eye in those without a partner. That is a law between men, and not primarily between man and God.
- Not talking to a member of the opposite sex inappropriately

== See also ==
- Jewish views on marriage
- Shalom bayit (peace and harmony in the family)
- Shidduch (finding a marriage partner)
- Women in Judaism
- Intimate parts in Islam and hijab (similar concepts in Islam)
