= Aleeza Ben Shalom =

American–Israeli matchmaker, relationship coach and television personality

Aleeza Bracha Ben Shalom
- עליזה ברכה בן שלום
- Ben Shalom in 2024
- Born: Philadelphia, Pennsylvania, U.S.
- Education: University of Pittsburgh
- Occupations: Matchmaker, relationship coach, and television personality
- Known for: Appearance on Netflix's Jewish Matchmaking
- Website: marriagemindedmentor.com

Aleeza Ben Shalom (Hebrew: עליזה בן שלום, Born March 4, 1977) is an American–Israeli matchmaker, relationship coach, author, and reality television personality. She is prominently featured in the Netflix series Jewish Matchmaking, which follows her attempts at helping Jewish singles in the United States and Israel find love and get married.

== Matchmaking and relationship coaching ==
In 2012, Ben Shalom founded Marriage Minded Mentor, a global service that provides matchmaking, dating coaching, matchmaker training, dating courses online and pairs Jewish singles with relationship coaches to help them circumvent the hurdles of modern dating. In 2022, the company expanded their services by partnering with JMatchmaking, the Jewish dating service founded by Montreal-based rabbi, Yisroel Bernath. Over the years, Ben Shalom has successfully paired over 200 Jewish singles get married.

On March 30, 2023, Netflix announced that, on May 3 of that year, they would be releasing Jewish Matchmaking which follows Ben Shalom in her role as matchmaker, meeting Jewish singles in both the United States and Israel to help them find a life partner. The show forms part of the Netflix Matchmaking Universe and was produced by the creators of their hit series Indian Matchmaking.

== Authorship and media ==
In 2013 Shalom published Get Real Get Married, which focuses on helping singles find their soulmate through intense self-reflection and assessment of values. In 2020, she published Virtual Dating: Your Guide to a Relationship in a Socially Distanced World, which grappled with the challenges that singles were facing during the COVID-19 pandemic in their journey to find love.

In December 2022, Shalom began a weekly podcast "Matchmaker, Matchmaker" with Rabbi Yisroel Bernath, where they discuss dating, love, and matchmaking. She started another podcast in March 2023, called The Yentas, which she co-hosts with fellow matchmakers Michal Naisteter and Danielle Selber, answering listener questions about dating.

In 2017 she was featured on season 1, episode 5 of the American Jewish comedy series, Soon By You.

She is a featured columnist for Aish, and has published articles in both The Wall Street Journal, HuffPost and The Times of Israel. She has also been featured on NPR and BBC World News.

In 2025, she wrote Matchmaker Matchmaker: Find Me a Love That Lasts.

She is the Director of Jewish Continuity for World Mizrachi.

== Personal life ==
Ben Shalom was born in Philadelphia, Pennsylvania. She holds a bachelor's degree in interdisciplinary studies from the University of Pittsburgh. In an interview with the Jewish Journal, Ben Shalom shared that she does not own a television.

In 2021 Shalom moved to Pardes-Hanna, Israel, with her husband, five children, and family dog, Koda the Kelev.

== See also ==
- Tova Weinberg
