= Negiah =

Forbids or restricts physical contact with a member of the opposite sex

Halakhic texts relating to this article
- Torah: Leviticus 18:6
- Babylonian Talmud: Sabbath 13a
- Mishneh Torah: Kedushah (Holiness), Issurei Biah (forbidden sexual relations), 21:1–7
- Shulchan Aruch: Even HaEzer 20–21

Negiah (Hebrew: נגיעה), literally "touch", is the concept in Jewish law (Halakha) that forbids or restricts sensual physical contact with a member of the opposite sex except for one's spouse and certain close relatives to whom one is presumed not to have sexual attraction. A person who abides by this halakha is colloquially described as a shomer negiah ("one observant of negiah").

The laws of negiah are typically followed by strict Orthodox Jews, with varying levels of observance. Some Orthodox Jews follow the laws with strict modesty and take measures to avoid accidental contact, such as avoiding sitting next to a member of the opposite sex on a bus, train, airplane, or other similar seating situations. Others are more lenient, only avoiding purposeful contact. Adherents of Conservative and Reform Judaism do not follow these laws. Many Jews with Orthodox beliefs believe that there is extensive room for leniency and that strict adherence to these rules stunts development and prevents social success and ultimately undermines well-being. Others understand the rules as clearly referring to sensual touch.

== Biblical prohibition and subsequent exegesis ==
The prohibition of negiah is derived from two verses in Leviticus: "Any man shall not approach (לקרב lekarev) his close relative to uncover nakedness; I am God" (18:6), and: "You shall not approach a woman in her time of unclean separation, to uncover her nakedness" (18:19). The first verse refers to incest, the second to sexual relations with a woman who is in niddah status due to menstruation. Although the verses speak in the masculine gender, women are equally bound by these commandments.

The Sifra notes that these verses prohibit a man to "approach... to uncover nakedness", rather than simply prohibiting the "uncovering of nakedness", implying a separate prohibition of "approaching" even without sexual intercourse. Based on this, some Rishonim view these verses as also prohibiting sexual touch (such as hugging and kissing) which falls short of sexual intercourse, including Maimonides and the Semag, who note the consideration of whether the contact is done derekh [chibah v']taavah (דרך [חבה ו]תאוה) in a[n affectionate or] lustful manner. However Nachmanides considers the prohibition to be a rabbinic law not derived from scripture, and views the derivation from Leviticus 18:6 as an asmachta (a rabbinic prohibition with a biblical allusion) and not true exegesis.

== Applicable individuals ==
The same actions are forbidden with a niddah and with a forbidden close relative. During the niddah period, even non-affectionate touch between husband and wife is forbidden; however this is commonly referred to as a harchaka (הרחקה, "distancing") rather than a case of being shomer negiah.

The laws do not prohibit touching certain close relatives to whom one is expected not to have sexual attraction: children, siblings, grandchildren, parents, and grandparents. Opinions differ on whether one may touch an adopted child of the opposite sex: R' Eliezer Waldenberg and R' Hayim David HaLevi permit, while R' Menachem Mendel Schneerson prohibits. Other authorities offer limited or conditional permission.

== Forms of touch forbidden ==
Maimonides and the Shulchan Aruch formulate this prohibition as "hugging, kissing, or enjoying close physical contact". They do not indicate that mere touching is forbidden.

Jonah of Gerona wrote that "any closeness of flesh is forbidden, for example touching [negiah] the hands of a married woman".

Regarding the question of whether all affectionate contact is forbidden, or only lustful sexual contact, R' Aharon Lichtenstein ruled that even non-sexual affectionate contact is forbidden. However, R' Yehudah Henkin ruled that only sexual contact is forbidden, at least according to Biblical law.

Incidental, unintended touch is permitted, for example when riding a crowded bus or train.

According to Rabbi Moshe Feinstein, there are two separate laws underlying the concept of negiah. The first law is the prohibition against close contact with forbidden women. Because females above the age of 11 are presumed to have begun menstruation, the negiah prohibition extends to all females above that age. The second law, called hirhur, prohibits causing oneself to have inappropriate sexual thoughts. Feinstein prohibits such acts as hugging, kissing, and holding hands. With regard to shaking hands, see below.

Like most laws, these prohibitions are waived to save a person who is in life-threatening danger, e.g. for a man to save a woman from drowning. In such cases, the prohibitions are waived even if the male rescuer is certain that he will experience improper thoughts (hirhur). Furthermore, medical practitioners and other professionals such as hairdressers may touch members of the opposite sex in the course of their professional practice.

=== Shaking hands ===
Whether halacha permits a man to shake a woman's hand (or vice versa) is a matter of dispute. Opinions range from saying that it is prohibited for a man to return a woman's handshake even if doing so would embarrass him or her, to saying that returning a handshake is permissible to avoid embarrassment but not otherwise, to saying that handshaking is entirely permissible.

Some authorities prohibit returning a handshake, even to avoid embarrassing the other person. These include the Chazon Ish, Yaakov Yisrael Kanievsky, Moshe Stern, Yitzchak Abadi, Sefer Hasidim (who prohibits even when wearing gloves), and Yosef Hayyim.

Rabbi Feinstein gives the benefit of the doubt to those who return a handshake, stating that they apparently hold that doing so is not derekh khiba v'taavah (דרך חבה ותאוה), but concludes that such leniency is difficult to rely upon. Although Feinstein did not address the mitigating factor of preventing the other person from being embarrassed, and fell short of stating outright that returning a handshake is forbidden, it is commonly assumed that R' Moshe prohibits returning a handshake even to avoid embarrassing the other person. One publication states this in very strong terms. Rav Yaakov Kamenetsky has also suggested that there may be room to be lenient in this situation.

J. Simcha Cohen has been quoted as giving a novel basis for permitting handshaking, based on the Yerushalmi and the ruling of Maimonides. Likewise, Yehuda Henkin holds that it is permissible to shake a woman's hand according to "the basic halacha" (the Rambam and Shulchan Aruch), and that those who feel otherwise are stringent. Hershel Schachter quotes Chaim Berlin as saying that shaking hands with women is strictly speaking (me'ikar haddin) permitted, particularly if to do otherwise would make the Torah look bad, and indicates that he agrees with this position.

According to Fuchs, only German Rabbis have traditionally permitted returning a handshake; and a man who is stringent about shaking hands may be lenient and shake hands with his sister (and vice versa), since we find other leniencies concerning brother and sister.

The Career Development Center at Yeshiva University, a Modern Orthodox institution, informs its students that "Shaking hands is a customary part of the interview process. Halacha permits non-affectionate contact between men and women when necessary. A quick handshake can be assumed to be business protocol. Since failure to shake hands will most likely have a strong negative effect on the outcome, it is necessary non-affectionate contact, which is permissible."

However, nonetheless, it has been said in the name of prominent Yeshiva University rabbis that one should not engage fully in a handshake, but rather, one should not hold a tight grip. His hand should be "helpless" and as if the other person is initiating and completing the full action, with his hand being the innocent bystander. Acting as such prevents embarrassment and or loss of a business deal, while at the same time allows one to stay in the framework of halacha (Jewish Law).

=== Shaking hands and relations with non-practitioners ===
Rabbi Menachem Mendel Schneerson wrote that remaining firm in one's convictions when it comes to shaking hands with a woman can engender the respect of the other party.

In contrast, some people view refusal to shake hands with members of the opposite sex as offensive or discourteous, or even sexist. The case of a woman whose offer of a handshake was politely declined by her real estate agent is discussed by the New York Times' "Ethicist" Randy Cohen. Orthodox rabbi and law professor Michael Broyde opined that in the case discussed by Cohen, the values of gender equality and of religious freedom are in conflict.

However, others argue that the "intent [of the practice is] to elevate and sanctify the relationship between men and women, which is all too often trivialized." They further state that, rather than showing a lack of respect for the opposite gender, the laws of negiah recognize the inherent sexual attraction between the sexes and the need to avoid viewing members of the opposite gender as objects of sexual desire, except in the marital context. Moreover, the practice is not discriminatory because "strictly observant Jewish women also do not touch men, so the prohibition clearly does not confer 'untouchable' status on one sex or another. Rather it proscribes physical contact between the sexes equally." Cohen, on the other hand, likens this argument to the "separate but equal" status rejected in school desegregation cases.

== Other meanings of negiah ==
In Jewish civil law, Negiah refers to the halakhic concept of having a vested interest in a dispute.

== In popular culture ==
- In the 2019 short film The Shabbos Goy, Hannah Levy approaches a man who extends his hand for a handshake. She declines by offering her scarf for him to shake instead.
- In the 2017 American teen comedy film F the Prom, two of the students at the lunch table find out the other is Jewish. The female student stretches her hand out towards the male student (Brendan Calton playing Strings / Efraim), who exclaims that he is shomer negiah and cannot touch a woman unless she is his wife.

== See also ==
- Jewish views on marriage
- Niddah (menstruation laws)
- Shalom bayit (peace and harmony in the relationship between husband and wife)
- Tzniut (modest behavior)
- Yichud (prohibition of seclusion in a private area of a man and a woman who are not married to each other)
- Purdah
- Islam and gender segregation
