= Tova Weinberg =

Jewish matchmaker

Tova Weinberg (née Levi) is a shadchan (Jewish matchmaker).

== Biography ==
Originally from Detroit, Michigan, Tova Weinberg moved to New York City in 1976 to teach science at Central Manhattan High School. Weinberg soon became acquainted with philanthropist Els Bendheim, who hosted dozens of Jewish singles at their home for Shabbat dinner. Weinberg and Bendheim organized Jewish singles parties, through which Weinberg made her first match.

Weinberg then enrolled in the dental program at New York University. Weinberg entered the field of matchmaking to help prevent intermarriage, after she and her husband Joel moved from New York to Pittsburgh, and the couple would meet Joel's Jewish colleagues with non-Jewish wives and girlfriends. Weinberg gave up practicing as a dentist and turned to matchmaking full-time. By 2014, she claimed to have introduced approximately 250 couples who later married. She works with Jews of all denominations and does not accept payment.

Weinberg co-founded SawYouAtSinai (SYAS), one of the first Jewish dating websites, in December 2003. As of 2013, SYAS claimed more than 30,000 users and to have had facilitated approximately 1,000 marriages. As of 2020, she remained a "matchmaking advisor" for SYAS.

== Personal ==
Weinberg met her husband Joel at the age of 24, and they married in 1979. The couple has five children, all of whom married, and 29 grandchildren. In 2019, the Weinbergs made aliyah to Israel.

== See also ==
- Aleeza Ben Shalom
