= Seoul Foreign Language Spelling Dictionary =

Standard romanization dictionary in Korea

- Native name: 서울시 외국어 표기사전
- Website type: Dictionary
- Available in: Korean
- Founded: 2002 (for English); 2013 (for Chinese and Japanese)
- Country of origin: South Korea
- Owner: Seoul Metropolitan Government
- Website: dictionary.seoul.go.kr
- Commercial: no

The Seoul Foreign Language Spelling Dictionary (Korean: 서울시 외국어 표기사전) is a database of recommended spellings for various Korea-related concepts published by the Seoul Metropolitan Government (SMG). It covers things such as foods, places, and organizations, and is in the English, Japanese, and Chinese languages. The SMG uses the dictionary as a basis for standardizing spellings in Seoul, especially in publicly visible signs and menus. It was started in August 2013.

== Description ==
A predecessor to the dictionary under the domain "englishname.seoul.go.kr" was created just for the English language in 2002. In August 2013, the dictionary was expanded to include Chinese and Japanese, making it the first such standard for these two languages in the country. It was maintained by an advisory committee (서울시 외국어 표기 자문위원회), which consisted of around 30 experts (10 for each language). Simplified Chinese and Japanese katakana are often used in the dictionary. The dictionary covers concepts in twelve categories: administrative districts, public institutions, natural places, transport, tourist sites, shopping, food, hospitality, education, medical/welfare, press/religion, and residential. It was first published with around 80,000 terms, with 48,000 in English and 16,000 each in Japanese and Chinese. Particular focus is given to concepts and places that tourists are likely to interact with.

The recommended spellings in the dictionary are not strictly mandatory for businesses, but officials from the SMG do consult with businesses and encourage them to adopt the spellings. The SMG has run multiple public campaigns in the past, wherein citizens are rewarded with cash for reporting incorrect spellings per the dictionary on government-owned signs.

In 2021, amidst tensions with China over the cultural identity of kimchi (vs. a similar Chinese dish pao cai), the dictionary began recommending the neologism xinqi (Chinese: 辛奇) for "kimchi", instead of the previously preferred pao cai.

== See also ==
- Standard Korean Language Dictionary – South Korea's standardized spellings in Korean
- Urimalsaem – an online open source Korean-language dictionary
