= Billy Graham rule =

Rule of some evangelicals to avoid isolated time with women other than their wife

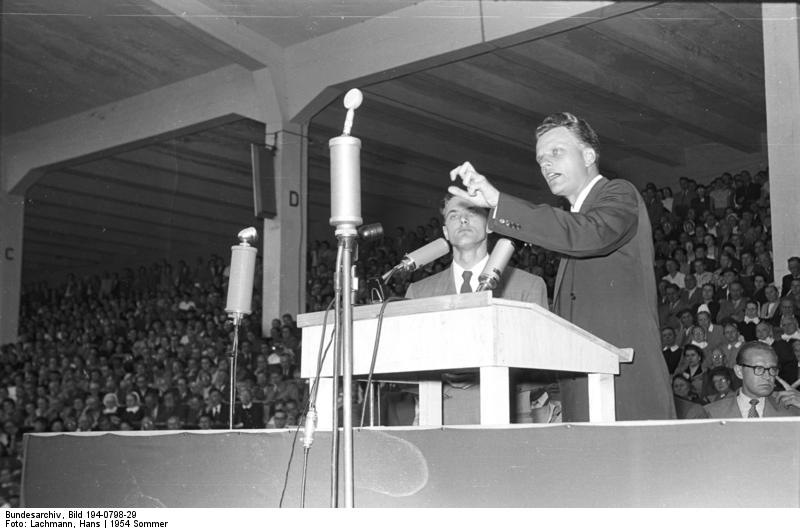
Graham speaking at a Crusade in Düsseldorf, Germany on June 21, 1954.

The Modesto Manifesto or Billy Graham rule is a code of conduct among male evangelical Protestant leaders, in which they avoid spending time alone with women to whom they are not married. It is adopted as a display of integrity, a means of avoiding sexual temptation, to avoid any appearance of doing something considered morally objectionable, as well as for avoiding accusations of sexual harassment or assault.

In 2017, it began to be also called the Mike Pence rule, after the former US vice president, a practicing Christian, who also supported the idea.

== History ==
In 1948, Graham held a series of evangelistic meetings in Modesto, California. Together with Cliff Barrows, Grady Wilson and George Beverly Shea, he resolved to "avoid any situation that would have even the appearance of compromise or suspicion".

By Graham's own admission, though, he was not an absolutist in the application of the rule that now bears his name: his autobiography relates a lunch meeting with Hillary Clinton that he initially refused on the grounds that he did not eat alone with women other than his wife, but she persuaded him that they could have a private conversation in a public dining room.

In 1979, the Billy Graham Evangelistic Association was inspired by the manifesto for the founding of the Evangelical Council for Financial Accountability.

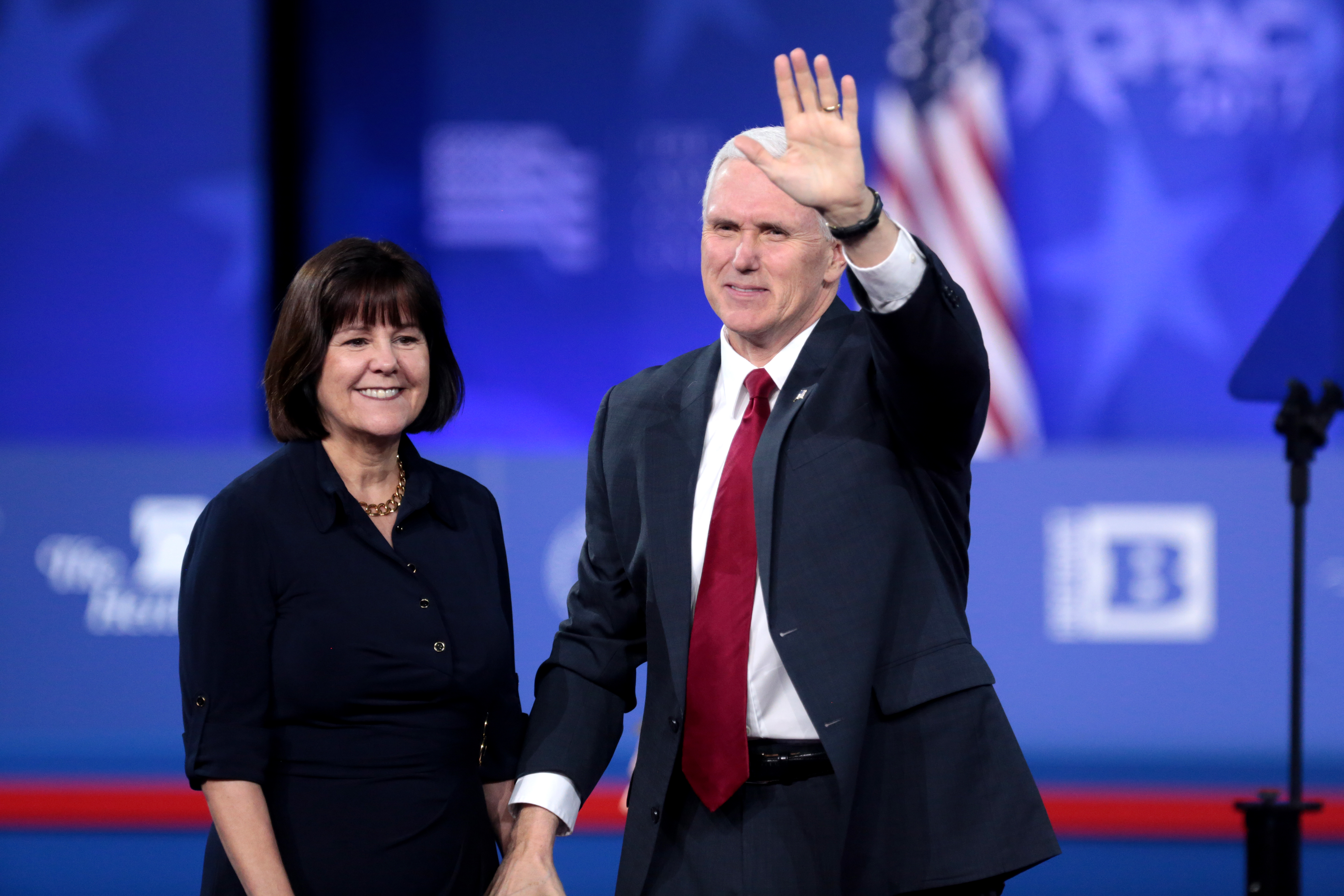
Vice President Mike Pence with his wife, Karen, in 2017.

In March 2017, The Washington Post noted that U.S. Vice President Mike Pence, a practicing Evangelical, never eats alone with a woman other than his wife, Karen, and that he will not attend events featuring alcohol without her by his side. Emma Green, writing for The Atlantic, noted that the controversy was an example of how "notions of gender divide American culture": while "socially liberal or non-religious people may see Pence's practice as misogynistic or bizarre", for "a lot of conservative religious people" the "set-up probably sounds normal, or even wise".

Polish science fiction writer Jacek Dukaj called this rule inevitable and likely to grow in popularity as an outcome of the #MeToo movement and cancel culture.

In the late 2010s, the rule entered the Korean language lexicon via "Pence Rule" (펜스 룰), and is currently featured in a moderated crowd-sourced online dictionary operated by the South Korean government called Urimalsaem.

== Features ==
The rule itself is actually one of four rules that Graham and his associates developed during his time in Modesto: the others involved depending on funds raised prior to a meeting (as opposed to offerings held during meetings), performing the work in conjunction with local churches (as opposed to apart from them), and to provide honest reports (as opposed to exaggerated figures).

== Controversies ==
The rule has been criticized for viewing women as potential objects of lust, as well as restricting opportunities for women to network with any male colleagues who happen to implement this rule. When applied to workplace dinners or meetings in the United States, it could result in illegal labor discrimination under Title VII of the Civil Rights Act of 1964. American pastor Tracey Bianchi says that one result is that "women are marginalized and cut out of opportunities to network, share their ideas, and advance in the organization." Bianchi also says that the rule conflicts with the practice of Jesus himself, who spent time alone with the Samaritan woman at the well. American pastor Ty Grigg says that the rule (assuming all American pastors implemented it) has not been "effective at curbing infidelity". He says that the rule "has framed relating with the opposite sex with fear", and that this leads to a diminished mutual respect, which in turn creates "the kind of environment where inappropriate relating is more likely to occur". Others, though, suggest that unfaithful pastors must have failed to implement the rule. In 2017, the manifesto was accused of sexism by Christianity Today editor Katelyn Beaty. Messianic Jewish author Michael L. Brown responded to this criticism by saying there was a misunderstanding about the manifesto. He says that the rule prevents third parties from suspecting that an illicit romantic relationship exists (avoiding the appearance of evil). It also protects against any future accusations should the other party become embittered and seek to attack the innocent boss. Finally, it does protect both parties from developing natural attractions and potentially falling into adultery.

== U.S. public opinion ==
According to a 2017 poll conducted by the Morning Consult for the New York Times, 53 percent of women and 45 percent of men believe that it would be inappropriate to have dinner alone with someone of the opposite sex who is not their spouse, compared to 35 percent of women and 43 percent of men who would consider it appropriate.

== See also ==
- GRACE (organization)
- Evangelical Council for Financial Accountability
- Appearance of impropriety
- "Caesar's wife must be above suspicion"
- Islam and gender segregation
- Yichud
