= Shidduch crisis =

Phenomenon in Orthodox Judaism

The shidduch crisis is a phenomenon in the Orthodox Jewish community whereby eligible single persons, especially women or Sephardim, have difficulty finding a suitable spouse, or a shidduch. There is some debate about the severity of the crisis and whether it is a recent development or a long-extant issue.

== Causes and solutions ==
Several causes have been cited for the shidduch crisis, but it is most commonly attributed to the average age gap between Orthodox Jewish women and men when they marry. Some members of the community dispute this as the root cause. Several initiatives in various Orthodox Jewish communities exist to close the age gap by offering rewards for shadchanim who make matches between men with women of approximately the same age.

Other possible causes include the increased scrutiny placed on eligible women and the shidduch system in general.

== Pandemic and online shidduch ==
During the COVID-19 pandemic, prolonged lockdown, and popularisation of mobile apps and online video calls, in-person dating and meeting new people became more challenging. In these circumstances, the internet-based shidduch regained its popularity not only among Orthodox Jews, but also among non-religious Jews. This new dynamic has been referred to as "the Shidduch Revolution".

== See also ==
- Jewish view of marriage
- Matchmaking
- Shidduch
- Shadchan (matchmaker)
- Role of women in Judaism
