= National Institute of Korean Language =

South Korean language regulator

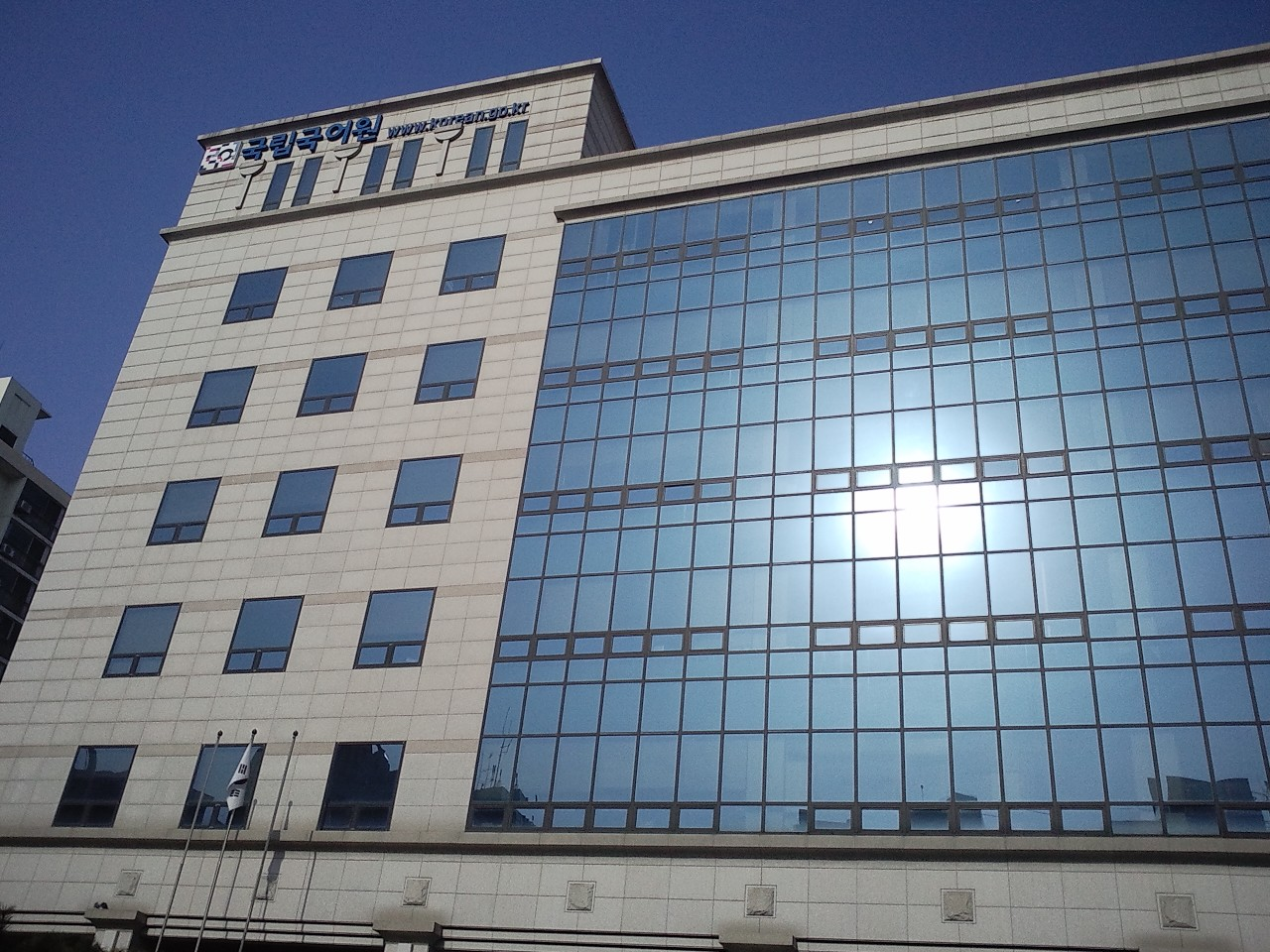
- Headquarter building in Seoul (2012)

Agency overview
- Formed: January 23, 1991
- Preceding agency: Research Institute of the Korean Language (private organization)
- Headquarters: 154, Geumnanghwaro (827 Banghwa-dong), Gangseo District, Seoul 07511, South Korea; 37.579115°N 126.813791°E
- Parent department: Ministry of Culture, Sports and Tourism
- Website: korean.go.kr (in English)

Korean name
- Hangul: 국립국어원
- Hanja: 國立國語院
- RR: Gungnip gugeowon
- MR: Kungnip kugŏwŏn

The National Institute of Korean Language (NIKL; Korean: 국립국어원) is a language regulator of the Korean language based in Seoul, South Korea. It was created on January 23, 1991, by Presidential Decree No. 13163 (November 14, 1990).

It has previously gone by a number of names, including the Academy of the Korean Language (국어연구소) when it was first founded as a non-government organization in 1984, and the National Academy of the Korean Language (국립국어연구원) when it became a government agency in 1991. It received its current Korean name in 2004 and its current English name in 2015.

Within the NIKL is the Center for Teaching and Learning Korean.

== Services ==
=== Standard Korean Language Dictionary ===
On January 1, 1992, it began work on compiling the Standard Korean Language Dictionary (SKLD). It published the dictionary on October 11, 1999 in three volumes. It published a revised and online version on October 8, 2008.

=== Korean-Foreign Language Learners' Dictionary ===
The NIKL maintains a number of online foreign language dictionaries for a variety of languages, including English, Russian, Vietnamese, Arabic, and Indonesian.

=== Urimalsaem ===
Urimalsaem (우리말샘) is an online, open source, and collaborative dictionary that users can edit in a manner similar to how Wikipedia operates, albeit with individual edits reviewed by experts. It was launched on October 5, 2016, with an initial set of 1,109,722 headwords.

=== Datasets ===
The NIKL maintains several datasets for use in research, one of which consists of 3,515,010 news articles in Korean from 2009 to 2018. The dataset has been used in a number of papers on natural language processing and machine learning, and have even had derivative datasets created based on them. In 2015, shortly before the 2016 Korean Sign Language Act, the NIKL began collecting a dataset for Korean Sign Language called the KSL Corpus Project. In 2022, it announced that it had collected 180 hours of language material from 148 deaf people at five locations, and was continuing to collect more.

== History ==
The NIKL was originally founded at a non-governmental level as the Academy of the Korean Language (국어연구소) on May 1, 1984. It was established as a subsidiary of the Korean Ministry of Culture on January 23, 1991 under the name National Academy of the Korean Language (국립국어연구원). It took its original name again on November 11, 2005, and again changed its name to its current form in October 2015.

On January 18, 2022, the NIKL announced several new initiatives:

- It would create a Korean language proficiency diagnosis system that leveraged assistance from artificial intelligence. The NIKL's director stated that "If we can implement an evaluation system worked on by 80 percent humans, and 20 percent with the help of AI, it can further increase efficiency. This makes it possible to conduct writing tests on a larger scale". The test is to be developed over five years, from 2023 to 2027, with a budget of ₩10 billion won ($8.39 million). The test aims to improve domestic writing skills and to be used on college entrance exams.
- It would make significant revisions to their dictionary, after it found that the 1999 Standard Korean Language Dictionary failed to keep up to major changes during the digital era. This project is expected to last between 2022 and 2026.
- To meet increasing demand and quality expectations for Korean language teachers outside of the peninsula, it would create a course and certification program for teachers.

== See also ==
- King Sejong Institute: government organization to spread Korean language and culture
- Seoul Foreign Language Spelling Dictionary – Seoul's dictionary of standard spellings in English, Chinese, and Japanese
