= Shalom bayit =

Jewish concept of domestic harmony

Shalom bayit (Hebrew: שְׁלוֹם בַּיִת, lit. 'lit. peace of the home') (also sholom bayit or shlom bayit, or (Yiddish) sholom bayis or shlom bayis) is the Jewish religious concept of domestic harmony and good relations between husband and wife. In a Jewish court of law, shalom bayit is the Hebrew term for marital reconciliation.

== Origin of term ==
The term sh'lom beto (Hebrew: שְׁלוֹם בֵּיתוֹ, lit. 'lit. peace of his home') is found in the Talmud regarding domestic peace in general. Nowadays, it is mostly used regarding matrimonial peace. This likely came from interpretations of the Mishneh Torah, in which the task of lighting candles in the home during Sabbath or Hanukkah is attributed to bringing divine peace into the home.

== As a Jewish value ==
Throughout the history of the Jewish people, Jews have held an ideal standard for Jewish family life that is manifested in the term shalom bayit. Shalom bayit signifies completeness, wholeness, and fulfillment. Hence, the traditional Jewish marriage is characterized by peace, nurturing, respect, and chesed (roughly meaning kindness, more accurately loving-kindness), through which a married couple becomes complete. It is believed that God's presence dwells in a pure and loving home

In Jewish culture, a marriage is described as a "match made in heaven," and is treated as a holy enterprise. For example, the Jewish betrothal ceremony is referred to in classical rabbinic literature as Kiddushin (meaning hallowing / sanctification / consecration). By declaring the marriage union sacred, a couple stands sanctified before God. It is in a relationship where both husband and wife recognize each other as creations in God's image and treat each other accordingly that true sanctity emanates forth. Moreover, this sanctity of the marital union reminds the Jewish husband and wife to express their holiness through marriage and to build a home based on mutual love, respect, and chesed.

=== In practice ===
The greatest praise the Talmudic rabbis offered to any woman was that given to a wife that fulfils the wishes of her husband. The husband too was expected to love his wife as much as he loves himself, and honour her more than he honours himself; indeed, one who honours his wife was said, by the classical rabbis, to be rewarded with wealth. Similarly, a husband was expected to discuss with his wife any worldly matters that might arise in his life.

Tough love was frowned upon; the Talmud forbids a husband from being overbearing to his household, and domestic abuse by him was also condemned. It was said of a wife that God counts her tears.

Contemporary rabbinical sources have also clarified explicit guidelines for maintaining shalom bayit. These include ritual practices, such as observing niddah, partaking in the mikveh, or checking one's tefillin. Behavioral practices include mutual respect, honor, and communication, yet some sources argue for strict conflict avoidance or differing in opinions. Oftentimes, the responsibility of maintaining shalom bayit is likened to the gender role for women.

== In the Midrash ==
In Jewish thought and law, domestic harmony is an important goal; to this end, an early midrash argues that a wife should not leave the home too frequently.

The goal may even warrant engaging in a "white lie". According to the Talmud, when God tells Sarah she will give birth to a son, she expresses disbelief, saying: "After I am waxed old shall I have pleasure, my husband being old also?" But when God speaks to Abraham, he says: "Why did Sarah laugh and say, 'Will I really have a child, now that I am old?'" (Genesis: 18:12-13). The rabbis comment that God omitted Sarah's mention of Abraham's age out of concern for their shalom bayit.

== Link to domestic violence ==
Due to its attribution to divinity in orthodox communities, shalom bayit has been linked with traditional concepts of get and agunot as contributing to a system of marriage and divorce which fosters a cycle of domestic abuse. Shalom bayit is attributed to being a barrier for the escape of a battered woman, for fear of the shame brought to those denied a get and claims by the abuser that asking for a get is a disruption to marital peace, thus violating a divine blessing.

== See also ==
- Jewish view of marriage
- Get (divorce document)
