= List of animated specials =

These are lists of animated television specials or films (including anime as OVAs).

== By holiday ==
=== Halloween film and television specials ===
==== Children and family ====
- ABC Weekend Special:
  - "Soup and Me" (1978)
- Ace Ventura: Pet Detective: Witch's Brew (1999)
- The Addams Family
  - "Puttergeist" (1992)
- ALF Tales
  - "The Legend of Sleepy Hollow" (1988)
- Alma's Way:
  - Trick or Treatasaurus (2022)
- The Alvin Show:
  - "Haunted House" (1962)
- Alvin and the Chipmunks:
  - "The Mystery of Seville Manor" (1987)
  - "Babysitter Fright Night" (1988)
- Alvinnn!!! and the Chipmunks
  - "Switch Witch" (2016)
- Angry Birds Stella
  - "Night of the Bling" (2015)
- Angry Birds: Summer Madness:
  - "Hollow-Weenie" (2022)
- Angry Birds Toons:
  - "Night of the Living Pork" (2013)
  - "Sweets of Doom" (2014)
  - "Porcula" (2015)
- Angela Anaconda
  - "Boo Who" / The Haunting of Angela Anaconda (2000)
- Archie's Weird Mysteries
  - "Halloween of Horror" (2000)
- Arthur:
  - "The Fright Stuff" (1999)
  - "Hic or Treat" (2007)
  - "Arthur and the Haunted Treehouse" (2017)
- The Bad Guys: Haunted Heist (2024)
- Bananas in Pyjamas
  - "The Trickisaurus" (2011)
  - "Halloween" (2012)
- Barney & Friends:
  - Barney's Halloween Party (1998)
  - Guess Who? / Sweet Treats (2007)
- The Batman: Grundy's Night (2005)
- Beetlejuice:
  - "Laugh of the Party" (1989)
  - "Bewitched, Bothered & Beetlejuiced" (1990)
- The Berenstain Bears
  - "Trick-or-Treat" (2003)
- Best Foot Forward
  - "Halloween" (2022)
- Beverly Hills Teens
  - "Halloween in the Hills" (1987)
- The Biskitts
  - "A Biskitt Halloween" (1983)
- Bobby's World: Night of the Living Pumpkin (1990)
- The Boss Baby: Back in Business
  - "Halloween" (2020)
- Boy Girl Dog Cat Mouse Cheese
  - "Greb Nefual E Neg" (2019)
- The Busy World of Richard Scarry
  - "The First Halloween Ever" (1996)
- Caillou
  - "Caillou Loves Halloween" (1999)
  - "Fall Is in the Air" (2000)
  - "Caillou's Halloween Costume" (2006)
- Calimero
  - "Scared Stiff" (2013)
- Casper's Halloween Special (1979)
- The Cat in the Hat Knows a Lot About That:
  - "Aye Aye" (2011)
  - "Trick or Treat" (2011)
  - "The Cat in the Hat Knows a Lot About Halloween!" (2016)
- The Chica Show
  - "A Halloween Adventure" (2014)
- Class of the Titans
  - "See You at the Crossroads" (2006)
- Claymation Comedy of Horrors (1991)
- Clifford's Puppy Days
  - "Clifford the Scary Puppy" (2005)
  - "Things That Go Bump" (2005)
  - The Halloween Bandit (2005)
- Clifford the Big Red Dog
  - "Boo!" (2000)
- Clifford the Big Red Dog (2019)
  - "The Halloween Costume Crisis/Clifford's Howl-o-ween!" (2021)
- "Corn and Peg"
  - "The Haunted Barn"
  - "Trick or Squeak"
- Curious George
  - "A Halloween Boo-Fest" (2013)
  - "Tale of the Frightening Flapjacks/Happy Yelloween" (2022)
- Cyberchase:
  - "Castleblanca" (2002)
  - Trick or Treat (2003)
  - The Halloween Howl (2006)
  - Watts of Halloween Trouble (2017)
- D-TV
  - "Monster Hits" (1987)
- The Daltons
  - "Funny Fangs Dalton" (2015)
- Davey and Goliath
  - "Halloween Who-Dun-It" (1967)
- The David S. Pumpkins Halloween Special (2017)
- Dinosaurs:
  - When Food Goes Bad (1991)
  - Little Boy Boo (1992)
- Dinosaur Train:
  - Night Train / Fossil Fred (2009)
  - Haunted Roundhouse / Big Pond Pumpkin Patch (2011)
- Donkey Hodie:
  - A Donkey Hodie Halloween (2022)
- DragonflyTV
  - "DragonflyTV’s First Annual Halloween Special" (2002)
  - "DragonflyTV’s Second Annual Halloween Special" (2003)
  - "DragonflyTV’s Third Annual Halloween Special" (2004)
  - "DragonflyTV’s Fourth Annual Halloween Special" (2005)
  - "DragonflyTV’s Fifth Annual Halloween Special" (2006)
  - "A DragonflyTV Halloween of Science" (2007)
  - "DragonflyTV’s Last Halloween" (2008)
- The Dog Who Saved Halloween (2011)
- The Doozers
  - "Spookypalooza" (2014)
- Dot.
  - "Scaremaster 2.0" / Ghoul Away (2016)
- Dragon
  - "Dragon's Fall Collection" / Dragon's Halloween (2006)
- Duck & Goose
  - "Go Trick or Treating" (2022)
- Eek! The Cat
  - "HallowEek" (1992)
- Ella the Elephant
  - "Ella's Special Delivery" / Frankie's Perfect Pumpkin (2014)
- Elinor Wonders Why
  - "Butterfly Party" / More Than One Right Way (2022)
- Eloise: The Animated Series
  - "Eloise's Rawther Unusual Halloween" (2006)
- Extreme Dinosaurs
  - "Night of the Living Pumpkins" (1997)
- The Fat Albert Halloween Special (1977)
- Festival of Family Classics
  - "Jack O' Lantern" (1972)
- Fetch! with Ruff Ruffman
  - "Ruffman Manor Is Haunted" (2010)
- Floogals
  - "Project Halloween" (2016)
- For Better or for Worse
  - "The Good-for-Nothing" (1993)
- For Real
  - "Halloween" (2020)
- Fred 2: Night of the Living Fred (2011)
- The Friendly Giant
  - "Halloween Concert" (1979)
- Gabby's Dollhouse
  - "Happy CAT-O-Ween!" (2022)
- Gadget and the Gadgetinis
  - "Trick or Trap" (2001)
- The Garfield Show
  - "Orange and Black" (2009)
- Garfield's Halloween Adventure (1985)
- Gary Larson's Tales from the Far Side (1994)
- Get Ace
  - "Halloween Hijinks"/Dawn of the Dumb (2014)
- Go, Dog. Go!
  - "Trick or Thief" / "Meow-Lo-Ween" (2023)
- The Great Bear Scare (1983)
- Halloween Is Grinch Night (1977)
- The Halloween That Almost Wasn't (1979)
- The Halloween Tree (1993)
- Hello, Jack! The Kindness Show:
  - "Jack’s Hallowonderful" (2022)
- HappinessCharge PreCure!
  - "The Big Bang Destroyed! Unexpected Formidable Appears!" (2014)
- The Haunting of Barney Palmer (1987)
- Harvey Girls Forever!:
  - "Harveyween" (2018)
  - "Scare Bud" (2020)
  - "All Harveys Eve" (2020)
- The Healing Powers of Dude: "House Party of Horrors" (2020)
- Helpsters
  - "Helpsters Halloween / Storyteller Sophia" (2020)
- Home: Adventures with Tip & Oh
  - "Kung Boov" / The Werewolves of Chicago (2016)
- Hugtto! PreCure
  - "Charged with Happiness! Happy Halloween!" (2018)
- If You Give a Mouse a Cookie
  - "If You Give a Mouse a Pumpkin" (2019)
- Interrupting Chicken
  - "Dr. Chickenstein" / "The Sorcerer’s Thesaurus" (2022)
- It's the Great Pumpkin, Charlie Brown (1966)
- Jackie Chan Adventures:
  - "Chi of the Vampire" (2002)
  - "Fright Fight Night" (2003)
- Jacob Two-Two
  - "Jacob Two-Two and the Halloween Hullabaloo" (2005)
- Jelly Jamm:
  - "The Monster of Boredom" (2013)
- Jellystone!:
  - "Spell Book" (2021)
- Jem
  - "Trick or Techrat" (1987)
- The Jetsons: Haunted Halloween (1985)
- Justin Time
  - "Cleopatra's Cat" (2011)
  - "The Count's Creepy Critters" (2016)
- Just Add Magic: "Just Add Halloween" (2016)
- Kate & Mim-Mim
  - "Lil' Boo" (2016)
- Lassie:
  - "The Witch" (1955)
  - Haunted House (1957)
  - "The UNICEF Story" (1959)
- The Last Halloween (1991)
- Life with Louie: Louie's Harrowing Halloween (1997)
- Little Charmers
  - "Spooky Pumpkin Moon Night" (2015)
- Little Ellen: "Happy Elloween" (2021)
- Little Lunch
  - "The Halloween Horror Story" (2016)
- The Little Rascals
  - "Fright Night" (1982)
- The Littles:
  - "The Big Scare" (1983)
  - "The Littles' Halloween" (1984)
- The Little Lulu Show:
  - "The Bogeyman" (1996)
  - "The Little Girl Who Never Heard of Ghosts" (1998)
- Llama Llama: "Llama Llama Trick or Treat" (2018)
- Madagascar: A Little Wild
  - "A Fang-tastic Halloween" (2020)
- Mad Mad Mad Monsters (1972)
- Madeline:
  - "Madeline and the Costume Party" (1993)
  - "Madeline and the Haunted Castle" (1995)
  - "Madeline's Halloween & Madeline and the Spider Lady" (2000)
- * Marvin the Tap-Dancing Horse:
  - "Elizabeth and the Haunted House/Marvin Horses Around "
- The Magic School Bus:
  - "Magic School Bus in the Haunted House" (1994)
  - "Magic School Bus Going Batty " (1995)
- Martin Mystery:
  - "Haunting of the Blackwater" (2004)
  - "The Vampire Returns" (2004)
  - "Curse of the Necklace" (2004)
- Maho Girls PreCure!:
  - "Sweet? or Not Sweet? The Magical Pumpkin Festival!" (2016)
  - "Today is Halloween! Everyone, By Smile!" (2016)
- The Mask: All Hallow's Eve (1995)
- Men in Black: The Series: The Jack O' Lantern Syndrome (1998)
- Mighty Morphin Power Rangers:
  - Life's a Masquerade (1993)
  - Trick or Treat (1994)
  - Zedd's Monster Mash (1994)
- Miss BG
  - "Party Contest; Alien Nightmares" (2005)
- Monster Buster Club
  - "Trick or Treat...or Alien?" (2008)
- Monster High: Ghouls Rule! (2012)
- Monster Mash (2000)
- The Mouse Factory
  - "Spooks and Magic" (1972)
  - The Dark (2008)
- The Mr. Peabody & Sherman Show: Spooktacular/Nicolas-Joseph Cugnot (2016)
- The Muppet Show:
  - "Vincent Price" (1976)
  - "Alice Cooper" (1978)
  - "Alan Arkin" (1980)
- Nature Cat
  - "Runaway Pumpkin" (2016)
  - "Dr. Pumpkinstein" (2023)
- Ned's Newt
  - "Home Alone with Frank" (1997)
- The New Adventures of Madeline
  - "Madeline and the Haunted Castle" (1995)
- The New Lassie
  - "Halloween" (1989)
- The New Misadventures of Ichabod Crane (1979)
- The New Worst Witch
  - "Trick or Treat" (2005)
- The Night of the Headless Horseman (1999)
- Oggy and the Cockroaches
  - "The Ghost-Hunter" (1998)
  - "Scaredy Cat" (2013)
- Pac-Man Halloween Special (1982)
- Pajanimals
  - "Spooky Costumes" (2012)
- PaRappa the Rapper (TV series)
  - "Are You Perhaps Scared?" (2001)
- Pat the Dog
  - "Trick or Treat Terror" (2017)
- Pearlie
  - "Hideous Halloween" (2009)
- Peg + Cat
  - "The Parade Problem" / The Halloween Problem (2013)
- Piggy Tales:
  - "Scared Sick" (2016)
  - "Shadow Pig" (2016)
  - "Pumpkin Head" (2016)
  - "Scary Fog" (2017)
  - "Ghost Hog" (2017)
- Pinkalicious & Peterrific
  - "Pink or Treat"/Scary Berry (2018)
  - "Pink Or Wizard" (2021)
- Pinky Dinky Doo
  - "Tyler Dinky Doo's Big Boo"
- Pixel Pinkie:
  - "Dare To Be Scared" (2009)
  - "Trick or Treat" (2009)
  - "Double Trouble" (2012)
- Pocoyo:
  - "Halloween Tales" (2017)
  - "Pocoyo and Nina's Terror Show" (2017)
  - "Pocoyo and the Haunted House" (2018)
  - "Halloween Potion" (2019)
  - "The Reflection" (2020)
  - "Elly's Magic Wand" (2020)
  - "Angry Alien's First Halloween" (2021)
  - "Pocoyo's Scary Halloween" (2021)
  - "The Goblin Mask" (2022)
  - "Monster Soup" (2024)
  - "An Unexpected Spell" (2024)
- Pokémon:
  - "The Tower of Terror" (1997)
  - "A Festival Trade! A Festival Farewell?" (2015)
  - "A Haunted House for Everyone" (2018)
- Polly Pocket (2018)
  - "The Badgering" (2018)
  - "Pocket Poltergeist" (2018)
  - "A Little Fright" (2018)
  - "Halloween Queen" (2020)
- Pucca
  - "Them Bones" (2006)
  - "Trick or Treat" (2019)
- A Pumpkin Full of Nonsense (1985)
- Raggedy Ann and Andy in The Pumpkin Who Couldn't Smile (1979)
- The Real Ghostbusters:
  - When Halloween Was Forever (1986)
  - Halloween II 1/2 (1987)
  - The Halloween Door (1989)
  - Deja Boo (1990)
- Ready Jet Go!:
  - "Jet's First Halloween" (2016)
  - "That's One Gigantic Pumpkin, Jet Propulsion!" (2018)
- ReBoot
  - "To Mend and Defend" (1998)
- Rolie Polie Olie
  - "The Legend of Spookie Ookie / Oooh, Scary / Zowie, Queen of the Pumpkins" (1999)
- Rude Dog and the Dweebs
  - "Nightmare on Dweeb Street" (1989)
- Sabrina: The Animated Series
  - "Nothin' Says Lovin' Like Something from a Coven" (1999)
- The Save-Ums!:
  - "Monkey Up a Tree!/It's Halloween!" (2003)
- Scary Godmother: Halloween Spooktakular (2003)
- Scary Godmother: The Revenge of Jimmy (2005)
- Schoolhouse Rock!
  - "Them Not-So-Dry Bones" (1979)
- Sesame Street:
  - "Episode 0657: Scary Street" (1974)
  - "Episode 4635: Halloween" (2016) (This episode was replaced by Snazzy Society in Australia)
- Sharkdog
  - "Sharkdog's Fintastic Halloween" (2021)
- Sharky's Friends: Spooky Special (2008)
- SheZow
  - Vampire Cats In Zombie Town (2013)
- Shining Time Station:
  - "Scare Dares" (1991)
- "Scared Shrekless" (2010)
- Sid the Science Kid
  - "Halloween Spooky Science Special" (2011)
- Skinner Boys: Guardians of the Lost Secrets
  - "Dragon's Breath" (2015)
- The Smurfs
  - "All Hallows Eve" / The Littlest Witch (1983)
- The Smurfs: The Legend of Smurfy Hollow (2013)
- The Snoopy Show: The Curse of a Fuzzy Face (2021)
- Snorks: A Willie Scary Shalloween (1987)
- Space Racers
  - "Haunted Asteroid" (2016)
- Space Goofs
  - "Spook to Rent" (1998)
  - "Count Gracula" (1998)
- The Spectacular Spider-Man
  - "The Uncertainty Principle" (2008)
- Spirit Riding Free
  - "Lucky and the Ghostly Gotcha!" (2018)
- Spookley the Square Pumpkin (2004)
- Spooky Bats and Scaredy Cats (2009)
- Stella and Sam
  - "Felix the Ghost" / Monster Misunderstanding (2013)
- The Strange Chores
  - "Witch Watch" (2019)
  - "Stop the Monster Slime" (2019)
  - "Don't Trick or Tweet" (2019)
- Strawberry Shortcake: Berry in the Big City
  - "Ghost of Cupcakes Past" (2021)
  - "Fright Fall" (2021)
  - "Scary-Oke" (2022)
  - "Save the Pumpkins" (2022)
  - "The House on Scary Berry Lane" (2023)
  - "Trick and Treat" (2023)
  - "Orange's Slumber Party" (2023)
- Stickin' Around
  - "The Ghost and Mr. Coffin" (1998)
- Stillwater
  - "Ghost Story" (2021)
- Suite PreCure
  - "WakuWaku! Everyone Transform for Halloween Nya!" (2011)
- The Super Mario Bros. Super Show!
  - "Count Koopula" (1989)
  - "Koopenstein" (1989)
- Super Why!
  - "The Ghost Who Was Afraid of Halloween" (2008)
- Teddy Bear Scare (1998)
- Talking Tom & Friends
  - "App-y Halloween!" (2015)
  - "Funny Robot Galileo" (2016)
  - "Double Date Disaster" (2017)
  - "Corn Heads" (2018)
  - "Hank vs. Vampires" (2018)
  - "The Secret Life of Ms. Vanthrax" (2019)
  - "My Sweet Halloween" (2020)
- Team Galaxy
  - "Trick or Treat" (2008)
- Teenage Mutant Ninja Turtles
  - "Super Irma" (1992)
- Teenage Mutant Ninja Turtles
  - "All Hallows Thieves" (2005)
- Tennessee Tuxedo and His Tales
  - "Goblins Will Get You" (1965)
- Theodore Tugboat:
  - "George's Ghost" (1994)
  - "Theodore and the Haunted Tugboat" (1998)
- This is Daniel Cook
  - "Trick-or-Treating" (2005)
- The Tom and Jerry Comedy Show
  - "Farewell, Sweet Mouse" (1980)
- Tom & Jerry Halloween Special (1987)
- The Twisted Tales of Felix the Cat
  - "Order of the Black Cats" (1995)
- Under the Umbrella Tree
  - "Halloween Under the Umbrella Tree" (1991)
- Where's Waldo? (2019 TV series)
  - "A Wanderer's Christmas" (2019)
  - "Where's Woof?" (2020)
- Where on Earth Is Carmen Sandiego?
  - "Trick or Treat?" (1996)
- The Wiggles: Wiggle and Learn (2024 YouTube Series)
  - "Halloween" (2024)
- Wild Kratts:
  - "A Bat in the Brownies" / Masked Bandits (2011)
  - "Secrets of a Spider's Web" (2012)
  - "Creeping Creatures" (2018)
  - "A Creature-Filled Halloween" (2021)
- Wingin' It
  - "Fright Club" (2011)
- Wishbone
  - "Frankenbone" (1995)
  - "Halloween Hound: The Legend of Creepy Collars: Part 1" (1997)
  - "Halloween Hound: The Legend of Creepy Collars: Part 2" (1997)
- W.I.T.C.H.
  - "W is for Witch" (2006)
- The Witch Who Turned Pink (1989)
- Witch's Night Out (1978)
- The Woody Woodpecker Show
  - "Spook-a-Nanny" (1964)
- Woody Woodpecker:
  - "Haunted Hijinks" (2018)
- WordGirl
  - "Tobey's Trick and Treats" (2009)
- WordWorld
  - "A Kooky Spooky Halloween" / Sheep's Halloween Costume (2008)
- The Worst Witch (1986)
- The Worst Witch
  - "A Mean Halloween" (1998)
- X-Men: The Animated Series
  - "Bloodlines" (1996)
- Yabba-Dabba Dinosaurs
  - "Dawn of the Disposals" (2021)
- Zou
  - "A Halloween Hunt" (2013)

==== Cartoon Network/Boomerang/Discovery Family ====
- 6teen:
  - "Boo, Dude!" (2005)
  - "Dude of the Living Dead" (2005)
- Almost Naked Animals:
  - "Howieween/Hotel of Horrors" (2011)
- The Amazing World of Gumball:
  - "Halloween" (2012)
  - "The Mirror" (2014)
  - "The Scam" (2016)
  - "The Ghouls" (2018)
  - "The Gumball Chronicles: The Curse of Elmore" (Season 1, Episode 1) (2020)
- Apple & Onion:
  - "The Eater" (2020)
  - "Eyesore At Sunset" (2021)
- Atomic Betty:
  - "When Worlds Collide/The Ghost Ship of Aberdeffia" (2004)
- Ben 10:
  - "Ghostfreaked Out" (2006)
  - "The Return" (2007)
  - "Be Afraid of the Dark" (2007)
- Ben 10: Alien Force:
  - "Ghost Town" (2009)
- Ben 10: Omniverse:
  - "Rad Monster Party" (2014)
  - "Charmed, I'm Sure" (2014)
  - "The Vampire Strikes Back" (2014)
- Ben 10:
  - "Scared Silly" (2017)
  - "Beware of the Scare-Crow" (2019)
- Camp Lazlo:
  - "Hallobeanies" (2005)
- Casper's Scare School:
  - "Boo!" (2009)
- Chowder:
  - "The Spookiest House in Marzipan/The Poultry Geist" (2009)
  - "The Birthday Suits" (2009)
- Clarence:
  - "Belson's Sleepover" (2014)
  - "Spooky Boo!" (2015)
  - "A Nightmare on Aberdale Street: Balance's Revenge" (2017)
- Codename: Kids Next Door:
  - "Operation: G.H.O.S.T." (2003)
  - "Operation: T.R.I.C.K.Y." (2004)
- Cow and Chicken:
  - "Halloween with Dead Ghost, Coast to Coast" (1998)
- Craig of the Creek:
  - "The Haunted Dollhouse" (2019)
  - "Trick or Creek" (2020)
  - "Legend of the Library" (2021)
- Dan Vs.:
  - The Wolf-Man" (Season 1, Episode 2) (2011)
- DC Super Hero Girls:
  - "#SoulSisters" (2019)
  - "#SchoolGhoul" (2020)
  - "#NightmareInGotham" (2021)
- Dexter's Laboratory:
  - "Monstory" (Season 1, Episode 13c) (1997)
  - "Filet of Soul" (1997)
  - "Scare Tactics" (2002)
- Ed, Edd n Eddy:
  - Ed Edd n Eddy's Boo Haw Haw (2005)
- Foster's Home for Imaginary Friends:
  - "Bloooo" (2004)
  - "Nightmare on Wilson Way" (2007)
- George of the Jungle:
  - "Frankengeorge/Afraid of Nothing" (2007)
- The Grim Adventures of Billy & Mandy:
  - "Grim or Gregory?" (2002)
  - Billy & Mandy's Jacked-Up Halloween" (2003)
  - Underfist: Halloween Bash (2008)
- Grojband:
  - "Dance of the Dead" (2013)
- The High Fructose Adventures of Annoying Orange
  - "Welcome to My Fruitmare" (2012)
  - "Peartergeist" (2013)
  - "Bat's All, Fruits" (2013)
  - "Little Cart of Scaries" (2013)
- Hi Hi Puffy AmiYumi
  - "Talent Suckers" (2004)
- I Am Weasel:
  - "I Am Vampire" (1998)
  - "I Are Ghost" (1999)
  - I Am Franken-Weasel" (1999)
- Johnny Bravo:
  - "Bravo Dooby Doo" (1997)
  - "A Wolf in Chick's Clothing" (1997)
  - "Going Batty" (1997)
  - "Frankenbravo" (2001)
- Johnny Test:
  - "Johnny Trick or Treat/Nightmare on Johnny's Street" (2011)
  - "The Johnny Who Saved Halloween/Johnny's Zombie Bomb" (2013)
- Justice League Action:
  - "Trick or Threat" (2017)
- Kenny the Shark
  - "Scaredy Shark" (2005)
- The Life and Times of Juniper Lee:
  - "It's the Great Pumpkin, Juniper Lee" (2005)
- Littlest Pet Shop (2012):
  - Littlest Pet Shop of Horrors" (2015)
- MAD:
  - "Kitchen Nightmares Before Christmas/How I Met Your Mummy" (2011)
  - "Frankenwinnie/ParaMorgan" (2012)
  - "Doraline/Monster Mashville" (2013)
- Mao Mao: Heroes of Pure Heart:
  - "Fright Wig" (2019)
- Mighty Magiswords:
  - "Flirty Phantom" (2016)
- The Mr. Men Show:
  - "Full Moon/Night" (2008)
- My Gym Partner's a Monkey:
  - "It's the Creppy Custodian, Adam Lyon" (2006)
- My Little Pony: Friendship Is Magic:
  - "Luna Eclipsed" (2011)
  - "Scare Master" (2015)
- Ninjago (TV series):
  - Ninjago: Day of the Departed (2016)
- OK K.O.! Let's Be Heroes:
  - "We Got Hacked" (2017)
  - "Parents Day" (2017)
  - "Monster Party" (2018)
- Out of Jimmy's Head:
  - Ghosts" (2007)
- Over the Garden Wall (2014)
- Pound Puppies (2010):
  - "Nightmare on Pound Street" (2010)
- Power Players:
  - "All Trick no Treat" (2019)
  - "Gathering Dark" (2019)
- The Powerpuff Girls
- "Boogie Frights/Abracadaver" (1998)
- The Powerpuff Girls
- "The Squashening" (2016)
- "Midnight at the Mayor's Mansion" (2017)
- "Witch's Crew" (2018)
- R.L. Stine's The Haunting Hour:
  - "Pumpkinhead" (2011)
  - "I'm Not Martin" (2014)
  - "Return of the Pumpkinheads" (2014)
- Robotboy:
  - "Halloween" (2005)
- Samurai Jack:
  - "Episode XXX: Jack and the Zombies" (2002)
- Scaredy Squirrel:
  - "Halloweekend" (2011)
- Sidekick:
  - "Halloweenie" (2010)
- Steven Universe:
  - "Horror Club" (2015)
- Stoked:
  - "Penthouse of Horror" (2009)
- Summer Camp Island:
  - "Ghost the Boy" (2018)
  - "Mop Forever" (2019)
- Teen Titans:
  - "Haunted (2004)
- Time Squad:
  - "White House Weirdness" (2002)
- The Tom and Jerry Show:
  - "Costume Party Smarty" (2019)
- Totally Spies!:
  - "Stuck in the Middle Ages with You" (2001)
  - "Halloween is Like So Pagan" (2005)
- Transformers: Animated:
  - "Along Came a Spider" (2008)
- Transformers: Rescue Bots:
  - "Ghost in the Machine" (2016)
- Tutenstein:
  - "Day on the Undead" (2004)
- Uncle Grandpa:
  - "Afraid of the Dark" (2013)
  - "Haunted RV" (2014)
  - "Fool Moon" (2015)
  - "Costume Crisis" (2016)
- Unikitty!:
  - "Spoooooky Game" (2017)
  - "Scary Tales" (2018)
  - "Scary Tales 2" (2019)
- Victor and Valentino:
  - "El Silbon" (2019)
  - "Ghosted" (2020)
  - "PuzzleMaster" (2021)
- We Baby Bears:
  - "Witches" (2022)
- We Bare Bears:
  - "Charlie's Halloween Thing" (2017)
  - "Charlie's Halloween Thing 2" (2018)
- Young Justice:
  - "Secrets" (2011)

===== Adventure Time =====
- "Slumber Party Panic" (2010)
- "The Creeps" (2011)
- "From Bad to Worse" (2011)
- "No One Can Hear You" (2011)
- "Ghost Fly" (2014)
- "Blank-Eyed Girl" (2016)

===== Courage the Cowardly Dog =====
- "Courage Meets Bigfoot" (1999)
- "The Demon in the Mattress" (1999)
- "Night of the Weremole" (1999)
- "Shirley the Medium" (2000)
- "King Ramses' Curse" (2000)
- "Courage Meets the Mummy" (2001)

===== Regular Show =====
- "Terror Tales of the Park" (2011)
- "Terror Tales of the Park II" (2012)
- "Terror Tales of the Park III" (2013)
- "Terror Tales of the Park IV" (2014)
- "Terror Tales of the Park V" (2015)
- "Terror Tales of the Park VI" (2016)

===== Teen Titans Go! =====
- "Halloween" (2014)
- "Scary Figure Dance" (2015)
- "Halloween vs. Christmas" (2016)
- Costume Contest" (2017)
- "Monster Squad!" (2018)
- "Witches Brew" (2019)
- "Ghost with the Most" (2020)
- "Pepo the Pumpkinman" (2021)
- "Welcome to Halloween" (2022)
- Haunted Tank" (2023)

===== Total Drama =====
- Total Drama Island:
  - "Hook, Line & Screamer" (2007)
- Total Drama Action:
  - "The Sand Witch Project" (2009)
- Total Drama World Tour:
  - "I See London..." (2010)
- Total Drama: Revenge of the Island:
  - "Finders Creepers" (2012)
- Total Drama: All-Stars:
  - "Moon Madness" (2013/2014)
- Total Drama: Pahkitew Island:
  - "Hurl & Go Seek" (2014)
- Total Drama Presents: The Ridonculous Race:
  - "A Tisket, a Casket, I'm Gonna Blow a Gasket" (2015)
- Total DramaRama:
  - "That's a Wrap" (2018)
  - "Ghoul Spirit" (2020)
  - "Duncan Carving" (2020)
  - "Gwen Scary, Gwen Lost" (2021)

==== Disney ====
- The 7D:
  - "Buckets" / "Frankengloom" (2014)
- Adventures in Wonderland:
  - "A Wonderland Howl-oween" (1993)
- Alice's Wonderland Bakery:
  - "A Hare Raising Halloween" (2023)
- American Dragon: Jake Long:
  - "Halloween Bash" (2005)
  - "A Ghost Story" (2007)
- Amphibia:
  - "The Shut-In" (2020)
- A.N.T. Farm:
  - "mutANT farm" (2011)
  - "mutANT farm 2" (2012)
  - "mutANT farm 3" (2013)
- Ariel:
  - "The Kite Monster" / "The Spooky Mirror Trick" (2024)
- Austin & Ally:
  - "Costumes & Courage" (2012)
  - "Horror Stories & Halloween Scares" (2014)
  - "Scary Spirits & Spooky Stories" (2015)
- Avengers Assemble:
  - "Into the Dark Dimension" (2016)
  - "Why I Hate Halloween" (2017)
- Bear in the Big Blue House:
  - "Halloween Bear" (1999)
- Best Friends Whenever:
  - "Cyd and Shelby's Haunted Escape" (2015)
  - "Night of the Were-Diesel" (2016)
- Big City Greens:
  - "Blood Moon" (2018)
  - "Squashed" (2021)
  - "Pizza Deliverance" (2022)
  - "No Escape" (2024)
- Big Hero 6: The Series:
  - "Obake Yashiki" (2018)
- Bizaardvark:
  - "Halloweenvark" (2016)
  - "Halloweenvark: Part Boo!" (2017)
  - "Halloweenvark Part 3: Mali-Boo" (2018)
- Bonkers:
  - "When the Spirit Moves You" (1993)
- Brandy & Mr. Whiskers
  - "The Curse of the Vampire Bat" / "The Monkey's Paw" (2004)
- Bride of Boogedy (1987)
- Bunk'd:
  - "Camp Kiki-Slasher" (2016)
  - "Fog'd In" (2016)
  - "In Your Wildest Dreams" (2019)
  - "Bunkhouse of Horror" (2022)
  - "The Glitching Hour" (2023)
- The Buzz on Maggie
  - "The Big Score" / "Scare Wars" (2005)
- Cars on the Road:
  - "Lights Out" (2022)
- Chibiverse:
  - "The Great Chibi Mix-Up!" (2022)
- The Chicken Squad
  - "T-Wrecks" / "Trick or Eek" (2021)
- Combo Niños:
  - "Night of the Zotz" (2008)
- Crash & Bernstein:
  - "Scaredy Crash" (2012)
  - "Health-o-ween" (2013)
- D-TV: Monster Hits (1987)
- Dave the Barbarian
  - "That Darn Ghost!" / "The Cow Says Moon" (2004)
- Disney Fam Jam
  - "Trick or Treat Yo Self" (2020)
- Disney's Greatest Villains (1977)
- A Disney Halloween Hosted by Snow White's Magic Mirror (1981)
- Disney's Halloween Treat (1982)
- House of Mouse:
  - "Halloween with Hades" (2003)
  - "House Ghosts" (2003)
- "Disney's Magic Bake-Off: Zombies" (2021)
- Disney Sing-Along Songs
  - "Happy Haunting - Party at Disneyland!" (1998)
- Doc McStuffins:
  - "Boo-Hoo to You!" (2012)
  - "Hallie Halloween" (2015)
- Dog with a Blog:
  - "Howloween" (2013)
  - "Howloween 2: The Final Reckoning" (2014)
- Don't Look Under The Bed (1999)
  - "Doug's Bloody Buddy" (1996)
  - "Night of the Living Dougs" (1998)
- Doraemon: Gadget Cat from the Future:
  - "Noby's Turn at Bat"/"The House of Forced Fitness" (2014)
  - "Werewolf Cream"/"Monsters In the House" (2014)
- DuckTales:
  - "The Trickening!" (2020)
- The Emperor's New School
  - "The Yzma That Stole Kuzcoween" / "Monster Masquerade" (2006)
- Eureka!:
  - "Eurek-Or-Treat" (2022)
- Even Stevens
  - "A Very Scary Story" (2001)
- Fancy Nancy:
  - Nancy's Costume Clash / Nancy's Ghostly Halloween (2018)
- Firebuds:
  - "The Not-So Haunted House" / "Halloween Heroes" (2022)
- Fish Hooks:
  - "Parasite Fright" (2011)
  - "Halloween Haul" (2011)
  - "Unfinished Doll Business" (2012)
  - "Chicks Dig Vampires" (2012)
- Frankenweenie (1984)
- Future-Worm!
  - "Robo-Carp-Alypse" / The Reemen / Dr. D, Ghost Hunter (2016)
- Gabby Duran & the Unsittables: Beware the Fright Master! (2021)
- Gamer's Guide to Pretty Much Everything:
  - "The Psycho Zombie Bloodbath" (2015)
  - "The Ghost" (2016)
- The Ghost and Molly McGee:
  - "Scaring is Caring" (2022)
  - "Frightmares on Main Street" (2023)
- Girl Meets World:
  - "Girl Meets World of Terror" (2014)
  - "Girl Meets World of Terror 2" (2015)
  - "Girl Meets World of Terror 3" (2016)
- Girl vs. Monster (2012)
- Go Away, Unicorn!:
  - Trick or Treat, Unicorn (2018)
  - Go Away, Frankencorn (2018)
- Goldie & Bear: Witch Cat is Which?/ Trick or Treat Trouble (2018)
- Good Luck Charlie:
  - "Scary Had a Little Lamb" (2011)
  - Le Halloween (2012)
  - Fright Knight (2013)
- Goof Troop:
  - "Hallow-Weenies" (1992)
- Gravity Falls:
  - "Summerween" (2012)
  - "Little Gift Shop of Horrors" (2014)
- Hailey's On It!:
  - "Beta's Gonna Hate/The A-maze-ing Maze" (2023)
- Halloween Hall o' Fame (1977)
- Halloweentown (1998)
- Halloweentown II: Kalabar's Revenge (2001)
- Halloweentown High (2004)
- Hamster & Gretel:
  - "The Nightmarionette" (2022)
  - "U-F-Uh-Oh" (2022)
- Handy Manny
  - "Halloween" / "Haunted Clock Tower" (2007)
  - "A Job from Outer Space" / "Sounds Like Halloween" (2011)
  - "Mrs. Lopart's Attic" (2012)
- Hannah Montana
  - "Torn Between Two Hannahs" (2006)
- Henry Hugglemonster:
  - "The Halloween Scramble" (2013)
  - "Huggleween Moon" (2015)
- Higglytown Heroes
  - "Halloween Heroes" (2004)
- High School Musical: The Musical: The Series
  - "Trick or Treat" (2023)
- Hotel Transylvania: The Series:
  - "The Legend of Pumpkin Guts" (2017)
  - "Welcome to Human Park" (2018)
- House of Mouse:
  - Mickey's House of Villains (2002)
  - "Halloween with Hades" (2003)
  - "House Ghosts" (2003)
- Hulk and the Agents of S.M.A.S.H.
  - "Hulking Commandos" (2014)
- I Didn't Do It:
  - "Next of Pumpkin" (2014)
  - "Bite Club" (2015)
- I'm in the Band
  - "Spiders, Snakes, and Clowns" (2010)
- Imagination Movers:
  - "A Monster Problem" (2009)
  - "Haunted Halloween" (2011)
- In a Heartbeat: A Night to Remember (2000)
- Invisible Sister (2015)
- Jake and the Never Land Pirates
  - "Night of the Golden Pumpkin" / "Trick or Treasure" (2011)
  - "Tricks, Treats & Treasure" / "Season of the Sea Witch" (2012)
  - "Misty's Magical Mix-Up!" (2013)
  - "Pirate Ghost Story" (2014)
  - "Jake the Wolf" / "Witch Hook" (2014)
  - "Escape from Ghost Island" (2015)
  - "Night of the Stonewolf" (2016)
- Jessie:
  - "The Whining" (2012)
  - "Ghost Bummers" (2013)
  - "The Runaway Bride of Frankenstein" (2014)
  - "The Ghostest with the Mostest" (2015)
- JoJo's Circus
  - "The Legend of Clownfoot Special" (2003)
- Jonas
  - "The Tale of the Haunted Firehouse" (2009)
- Just Roll with It:
  - "Root of All Fears" (2019)
  - "Aliens Among Us" (2020)
  - "You Decide LIVE!" (2021)
- K.C. Undercover:
  - "All Howl's Eve" (2015)
  - "Virtual Insanity" (2016)
- Kick Buttowski: Suburban Daredevil
  - "Kick or Treat" / "Dead Man's Roller Coaster" (2011)
  - "Petrified!" (2012)
- Kickin' It:
  - "Boo Gi Nights" (2011)
  - "Wazombie Warriors" (2012)
  - "Temple of Doom" (2013)
- Kid vs. Kat
  - "Trick or Threat" (2009)
  - "House of Scream" (2009)
- Kiff:
  - "Trevor's Rockin' Halloween Bash" (2023)
  - "The Haunting of Miss McGravy's House" (2024)
- Kim Possible:
  - "October 31" (2002)
- Kirby Buckets:
  - "Flice of the Living Dead" (2014)
  - "The School Spirit" (2015)
- Lab Rats:
  - "Night of the Living Virus" (2012)
  - "The Haunting of Mission Creek High" (2013)
  - "Sheep Shifting" (2016)
  - "Spike Fright" (2014)
  - "The Curse of the Screaming Skull" (2015)
- Lego Star Wars: Terrifying Tales (2021)
- Lilo & Stitch: The Series
  - "Spooky" (2003)
- The Lion Guard:
  - "Beware the Zimwi" (2016)
- Little Einsteins
  - "A Little Einsteins Halloween" (2005)
- Liv and Maddie:
  - "Kang-a-Rooney" (2013)
  - "Helgaween-a-Rooney" (2014)
  - "Haunt-a-Rooney" (2015)
  - "Scare-A-Rooney" (2016)
- Lizzie McGuire
  - "Night of the Day of the Dead" (2001)
- Lloyd in Space
  - "Halloween Scary Fun Action Plan" (2003)
- Max Steel
  - "Definitely Fear the Reaper" (2014)
- Mickey Mouse:
  - "Ghoul Friend" (2013)
  - "The Boiler Room" (2014)
  - "Black or White" (2015)
  - "The Scariest Story Ever: A Mickey Mouse Halloween Spooktacular" (2017)
- Mickey Mouse Clubhouse:
  - "Mickey's Treat" (2006)
  - "Mickey's Monster Musical" (2015)
- Mickey Mouse Funhouse:
  - "Fifty-Foot Pluto!" (2022)
  - "Ghosts of Haunted Gulch" (2022)
  - "Cora the Pirate Crab/The Curious Case of the Kooky Scientist" (2023)
  - "Stink, Stank, Stink!"/"Dia de Los Muertos" (2023)
  - "Halloweenville's Pumpkin Patch/"Martian Vs. Rocket Mouse!" (2024)
- Mickey and the Roadster Racers/Mickey Mouse Mixed-Up Adventures:
  - "The Haunted Hot Rod" / "Pete's Ghostly Gala" (2017)
  - "Goof Mansion" / A Doozy Night of Mystery (2018)
  - "The Spooky Spook House!" / Clarabelle's Banana Splitz! (2021)
- Mickey's Tale of Two Witches (2021)
- Mickey and Friends Trick or Treats (2023)
- Mighty Med:
  - "Frighty Med" (2013)
  - "Lair, Lair" (2014)
- Milo Murphy's Law
  - "Milo Murphy's Halloween Scream-o-Torium!" (2017)
- Mom's Got a Date with a Vampire (2000)
- Moon Girl and Devil Dinosaur
  - "Coney Island, Baby!" (2023)
- Motorcity: Mayhem Night (2012)
- The Mouse Factory: Spooks and Magic (1972)
- Mr. Boogedy (1986)
- Mr. Young: Mr. Candy (2012)
- Muppet Babies:
  - "Happy Hallowakka" / The Teeth-Chattering Tale of the Haunted Pancakes (2018)
  - "Oh My Gourd" / The Curse of the Wereanimal (2021)
- Muppets Haunted Mansion (2021)
- My Babysitter's a Vampire
  - "Halloweird" (2012)
- Once Upon a Halloween (2005)
- Out of the Box
  - "Trick or Treat" (1999)
- The Owl House:
  - "Thanks to Them" (2022)
- Pac-Man and the Ghostly Adventures
  - "A Berry Scary Night" (2013)
  - "The Shadow of the Were-Pac" (2014)
  - "Pac's Scary Halloween Part 1" and Part 2 (2015)
- Pair of Kings:
  - "Pair of Clubs" (2011)
  - "King vs. Wild" (2012)
- Pat the Dog
  - "Trick or Treat Terror" (2017)
- PB&J Otter
  - "A Hoohaw Halloween" (2001)
- Penn Zero: Part-Time Hero:
  - "Brainzburgerz" (2015)
  - "Be My Ghost" (2017)
- Phantom of the Megaplex (2000)
- Phil of the Future
  - "Halloween" (2004)
- Phineas and Ferb:
  - "Get That Bigfoot Outa My Face!" (2008)
  - "One Good Scare Ought to Do It!" (2008)
  - "The Monster of Phineas-n-Ferbenstein" (2008)
  - "Day of the Living Gelatin" (2009)
  - "Invasion of the Ferb Snatchers" (2010)
  - "That's the Spirit!" / "The Curse of Candace" (2011)
  - "Monster from the Id" (2012)
  - "Terrifying Tri-State Trilogy of Terror" (2013)
  - "Drusselsteinoween" (2013)
  - "Face Your Fear" (2013)
  - "Cheers for Fears" (2013)
  - "Night of the Living Pharmacists" (2014)
- Pickle and Peanut:
  - "Gory Agnes" / Haunted Couch (2015)
  - "Trick or Treat" (2016)
- Primos
  - "Summer of La Mũneca" (2024)
  - "Summer of La Hamaca" (2024)
  - "Summer of Hacienda Chills" (2024)
- The Proud Family
  - "A Hero for Halloween" (2002)
- Pupstruction: "Happy Howl-o-Ween/The House of Howls" (2023)
- Puppy Dog Pals:
  - Return to the Pumpkin Patch / Haunted Howl-oween (2017)
  - 221B Barker Street / Leaf It To Puppies (2020)
  - Halloween Puppy Fashion Show Party / Full Moon Fever (2021)
  - The Pumpkin King / The Elf Who Halloween’d (2022)
- Quack Pack
  - "The Boy Who Cried Ghost" (1996)
- Randy Cunningham: 9th Grade Ninja:
  - "Dawn of the Driscoll" / Night of the Living McFizzles (2012)
  - "Let the Wonk One In" / The Curse of Mudfart (2014)
- Raven's Home:
  - "The Baxtercism of Levi Grayson" (2017)
  - "Switch-or-Treat" (2018)
  - "Creepin' It Real" (2019)
  - "Don't Trust the G In Apartment B" (2020)
  - "The Girl Who Cried Tasha" (2022)
- Recess:
  - "The Terrifying Tales of Recess" (2001)
- Recess: Taking the Fifth Grade: Episode Three: A Recess Halloween (2003)
- The Replacements:
  - "Halloween Spirits" (2006)
- Return to Halloweentown (2006)
- Rolie Polie Olie
  - "The Legend Of Spookie Ookie" / Oooh Scary / Zowie, Queen Of The Pumpkins (1999)
- Sabrina: The Animated Series
  - "Nothin' Says Lovin' Like Somethin' from a Coven" (1999)
- The Scream Team (2002)
- Shake It Up:
  - "Beam It Up" (2011)
  - "Haunt It Up" (2013)
- Sheriff Callie's Wild West
  - "The Great Halloween Robbery" / The Ghost of the Scary Prairie (2016)
- The Shnookums & Meat Funny Cartoon Show:
  - "Night of the Living Shnookums" (1995)
- So Weird: Boo (1999)
- Sofia the First:
  - "Princess Butterfly" (2013)
  - "Ghostly Gala" (2014)
  - "Cauldronation Day" (2016)
  - "Too Cute to Spook" (2017)
- Sonny with a Chance / So Random:
  - "A So Random Halloween Special" (2010)
  - "Iyaz" (2011)
- Special Agent Oso:
  - "A View to a Mask" / "Pumpkin Eyes" (2010)
- Spider-Man:
  - "Halloween Moon" (2017)
- Spidey and His Amazing Friends:
  - "Trick or TRACE-E" (2021)
  - "Boosie's Haunted Adventure/Too Many Tricks, Not Enough Treats" (2023)
- Star vs. the Forces of Evil:
  - "Hungry Larry" (2016)
- Stuck in the Middle:
  - "Stuck in a Merry Scary" (2017)
- The Suite Life of Zack & Cody:
  - "The Ghost of Suite 613" (2005)
  - "Scary Movie" (2006)
  - "Arwinstein" (2007)
- The Suite Life on Deck:
  - "Sea Monster Mash" (2008)
  - "Can You Dig It?" (2010)
  - "The Ghost and Mr. Martin" (2010)
- SuperKitties:
  - "Howloween Cat" (2023)
- Super Robot Monkey Team Hyperforce Go!:
  - "Seacon of the Skull" (2005)
- Sydney to the Max:
  - "The Hunt for The Rad October" (2021)
- Tangled: The Series:
  - "The Wrath of Ruthless Ruth" (2017)
- Teacher's Pet:
  - "The Tale of the Telltale Taffy" (2001)
- Teamo Supremo
  - "Haunted House on Horror Hill!" (2002)
- That's So Raven:
  - "Don't Have a Cow" (2003)
  - "Cake Fear" (2005)
- The Hive: "The Pumpkin Patch Puzzle"
- Timon & Pumbaa:
  - "Guatemala Malarkey" (1995)
  - "Jamaica Mistake?" (1996)
  - "Monster Massachusetts" (1996)
  - "Werehog of London" (1999)
  - "Ghost Boosters" (1999)
- Tower of Terror (1997)
- T.O.T.S.
  - "A Spooky Delivery" (2020)
- Toy Story of Terror! (2013)
- Twitches (2005)
- Twitches Too (2007)
- Under Wraps (1997)
- Under Wraps (2021)
- Under Wraps 2 (2022)
- Vampirina:
  - "Hauntleyween" / "Franklenflower" (2018)
  - "Trick or Treaters" / "Play It Again Vee" (2019)
  - "Jumping Jack-o-Lanterns" / "Freeze Our Guest" (2019)
  - "The Vamp-Opera" / "This Haunted House Is Closed" (2019)
- The Villains of Valley View:
  - "Havoc-ween" (2022)
  - "The Haunted Jukebox" (2023)
- The Weekenders:
  - "Nevermore" (2003)
- Walk the Prank:
  - "Prank or Treat" (2016)
- Wander Over Yonder:
  - "The Pet" (2013)
  - "The Gift 2: The Giftening" (2014)
  - "The Heebie Jeebies" (2016)
- The Wonderful World of Mickey Mouse:
  - "Houseghosts" (2021)
- Wizards of Waverly Place"
  - "Halloween" (2009)
- Yin Yang Yo:
  - "The Howl of the Weenie" (2008)
- Zeke and Luther:
  - "Haunted Board" (2009)
- The ZhuZhus:
  - Zombie Sleep Over (2016)
  - The Pumpkin Whisperers (2017)
- Zombies: The Re-Animated Series
  - "Screambrook" (2024)

===== Winnie the Pooh =====
- Welcome to Pooh Corner:
  - "Because it's Halloween!" (1984)
- Boo to You Too! Winnie the Pooh (1996)
- The Book of Pooh:
  - "The Book of Boo!" (2002)
- Pooh's Heffalump Halloween Movie (2005)
- My Friends Tigger & Pooh:
  - "The Hundred Acre Wood Haunt" (2008)
  - "Darby's Halloween Case" (2009)

===== Ultimate Spider-Man =====
- Blade (2013)
- The Howling Commandos (2013)
- Halloween Night at the Museum (2014)
- Strange Little Halloween (2016)

===== Goosebumps =====
- The Haunted Mask (1995)
- Attack of the Jack-O'-Lanterns (1996)
- The Haunted Mask II (1996)

===== Nickelodeon/Nicktoons/Nick Jr. =====
- 100 Deeds for Eddie McDowd
  - "All Howls Eve" (2000)
- 100 Things to Do Before High School
  - "Have the Best Halloween School Day Ever Thing!" (2015)
- Aaahh!!! Real Monsters
  - "The Switching Hour" (1994)
- Abby Hatcher
  - "Trick or Treat Otis" (2019)
- The Adventures of Jimmy Neutron: Boy Genius
  - "Nightmare in Retroville" (2003)
- The Adventures of Paddington
  - "Paddington and Halloween" (2020)
  - "Paddington and the Halloween Mystery/Paddington's Campfire Stories" (2022)
- The Adventures of Pete and Pete Halloweenie (1994)
- All Grown Up!
  - "TP + KF" (2007)
- All That
  - "CNCO" (2019)
- Allegra's Window
  - "My Own Monster" (1994)
- The Angry Beavers
  - "The Day the World Got Really Screwed Up" (1998)
- Are You Afraid of the Dark?:
  - "The Tale of the Twisted Claw" (1991)
  - "The Tale of the Laughing in the Dark" (1992)
  - "The Tale of the Midnight Ride" (1994)
- As Told By Ginger
  - "I Spy a Witch" (2001)
- Avatar: The Last Airbender
  - "The Puppetmaster" (2007)
- Baby Shark's Big Show!
  - "Baby Shark's Haunted Halloween" / Wavey Jones' Locker (2021)
- Back at the Barnyard
  - "Back at the Booyard" (2009)
- The Backyardigans:
  - "It's Great to Be a Ghost!" (2004)
  - "Monster Detectives" (2005)
  - "Scared of You" (2006)
  - "The Funnyman Boogeyman" (2009)
- Bella and the Bulldogs
  - "Sha-Boo! Ya" (2015)
- Big Nate:
  - "Ghostly Coven of Man Witches" (2022)
  - "Scarytale Endings" (2024)
- Big Time Rush: "Big Time Halloween" (2010)
- Blaze and the Monster Machines
  - "Truck or Treat" (2015)
  - "Monster Machine Halloween" (2022)
- Blue's Clues:
  - "What is Blue Afraid Of?" (1997)
  - "Blue's Big Costume Party" (2000)
- Blue's Clues & You!:
  - "Spooky Costume Party with Blue" (2020)
  - "The Ghost of the Living Room" (2021)
  - "The Legend of the Jack O'Lantern" (2022)
- Bossy Bear: "Nightmare on Sweet Street/Monster Mess/Fall Festival" (2023)
- Breadwinners
  - "Night of the Living Bread" (2014)
- Bubble Guppies
  - "Haunted House Party!" (2011)
  - "Trick-or-Treat, Mr. Grumpfish!" (2016)
  - "Werewolves of Bubbledon!" (2021)
- Bunsen Is a Beast: Beast Halloween Ever (2017)
- Butterbean's Cafe: "A Bean for Halloween" (2019)
- The Casagrandes
  - "New Haunts" (2019)
  - "Curse of the Candy Goblin" (2021)
- CatDog
  - "CatDogula" (1999)
- Catscratch
  - "Scaredy Cat" (2005)
- ChalkZone
  - "Pumpkin Love" / Chip of Fools / Irresistible / Please Let Me In (2003)
- Clarissa Explains It All
  - "Haunted House" (1991)
- Danny Phantom
  - "Fright Night" (2004)
- Dora and Friends: Into the City!
  - "Trick or Treat" (2015)
- Dora the Explorer:
  - "Boo!" (2003)
  - "Halloween Parade" (2011)
- Doug
  - "Doug's Halloween Adventure" (1994)
- Drake & Josh
  - "Alien Invasion" (2006)
- Eureeka's Castle
  - "It Came from Beneath the Bed" (1991)
- The Fairly OddParents:
  - Scary Godparents (2002)
  - Poltergeeks (2011)
  - Scary GodCouple (2013)
- Fanboy & Chum Chum
  - "There Will Be Shrieks" (2011)
- Franklin
  - "Franklin's Halloween" (1997)
- Franklin and Friends
  - "It's Halloween Franklin!" (2013)
- The Fresh Beat Band
  - "Glow for it" (2010)
  - "Ghost Band" (2011)
- Fresh Beat Band of Spies
  - "Ghost of Rock" (2015)
- Game Shakers
  - "Scare Tripless" (2015)
- Go, Diego, Go
  - "Freddie the Fruit Bat Saves Halloween!" (2008)
- Group Chat
  - "Sliming for Apples" (2020)
- Gullah Gullah Island
  - "Gullah Gullah Ghoul-Land" (1997)
- Harvey Beaks:
  - "Le Corn Maze... OF DOOM; Harvey Isn't Scary" (2015)
  - "Technoscare" (2016)
- The Haunted Hathaways:
  - "Haunted Halloween" (2013)
  - "The Haunted Thundermans" (2014)
- Henry Danger:
  - "Jasper Danger" (2014)
  - "Danger Things" (2018)
- Hey Arnold!:
  - "Downtown as Fruits" (1996)
  - "Arnold's Halloween" (1997)
  - "Headless Cabbie" / "Friday the 13th" (1999)
- How to Rock
  - "How to Rock Halloween" (2012)
- iCarly:
  - iScream on Halloween (2007)
  - iHalfoween (2012)
- Invader Zim
  - "Halloween Spectacular Spooky Doom" (2001)
- It's Pony
  - "Scarecrow" / Cornapples (2020)
- Kamp Koral: SpongeBob's Under Years
  - "Cabin of Curiosities" (2021)
  - "Are You Afraid of the Dork?" (2021)
  - "Camp Spirit" (2022)
  - "Scaredy Squirrel" (2023)
  - "Cretins of the Night" (2024)
- Kenan & Kel
  - "Two Heads Are Better Than None" (2000)
- Knight Squad
  - "Fright Knight" (2018)
- Kung Fu Panda: Legends of Awesomeness
  - "The Po Who Cried Ghost" (2012)
- LazyTown:
  - "Cry Dinosaur" (2004)
  - "Haunted Castle" (2006)
- Lego Jurassic World: Legend of Isla Nublar
  - "The Haunted and the Hunted" (2020)
- Little Bear:
  - "How to Scare Ghosts" (1997)
  - "Goblin Night" (1998)
  - "Moonlight Serenade" (1999)
  - "Thunder Monster" (1999)
  - "Little Goblin Bear" (1999)
- Little Bill
  - "The Halloween Costume" / The Haunted Halloween Party (2001)
- The Loud House
  - "One Flu over the Loud House" (2016)
  - "Tricked!" (2017)
  - "Great Lakes Freakout!" (2022)
  - "Close Encounters of the Nerd Kind" (2024)
- Maggie and the Ferocious Beast
  - "Trick or Treat" (2002)
- Max & Ruby:
  - "Max's Halloween" (2002)
  - "Max and Ruby's Perfect Pumpkin / Max's Jack-o-Lantern / Max's Big Boo" (2007)
  - "Ruby and the Beast / Max and Ruby's Halloween House / Max's Trick or Treat" (2012)
  - "Ruby's Party" (2017)
- Middlemost Post:
  - "Scary Stories to Tell Your Cloud / The Pumpkin Pageant" (2021)
  - "More Scary Stories to Tell Your Cloud" (2022)
- The Mighty B!: Catatonic (2009)
- Miss Spider's Sunny Patch Friends: "A Bug-a-Boo Day Play"
- Monster High: The Series: "Spell the Beans" (2023)
- Monsters vs. Aliens: Mutant Pumpkins from Outer Space (2009)
- Moose and Zee
  - "I Don't Like Candy Corn" (2003)
- Mutt & Stuff
  - "The Happy Hallowoof Party" (2016)
- My Life as a Teenage Robot:
  - "Raggedy Android" (2003)
  - "The Return of Raggedy Android" (2003)
- The Mystery Files of Shelby Woo
  - "The Haunted House Mystery" (1998)
- Mystery Magical Special (1986)
- Ned's Declassified School Survival Guide
  - "Halloween & Vampires, Werewolves, Ghosts and Zombies" (2006)
- Nella the Princess Knight
  - "The Halloween Hippogriff (2017)
- Ni Hao, Kai-Lan
  - "Ni Hao, Halloween" (2008)
- Nicky, Ricky, Dicky & Dawn:
  - "Field of Brains" (2014)
  - "Scaredy Dance" (2014)
- Oobi
  - "Halloween" (2003)
- Ollie's Pack
  - "Nightmare Frightscare" (2020)
- The Patrick Star Show
  - "The Haunting of Star House" (2021)
  - "Terror at 20,000 Leagues" (2021)
  - "Something Stupid This Way Comes" (2024)
- The Penguins of Madagascar
  - "I Was a Penguin Zombie" (2009)
  - "Driven to the Brink" (2010)
- Planet Sheen
  - "There's Something About Scary" (2010)
- Play Along with Sam
  - "The Spooky Party" (2014)
- Rabbids Invasion
  - "Rabbid Halloween" (2014)
- Rainbow Rangers
  - "Spooky Costume Party" (2020)
- The Really Loud House
  - "Sweet Dreams Are Made of Cheese" (2023)
  - "The Really Haunted Loud House" (2023)
- The Ren & Stimpy Show
  - "Haunted House" (1992)
- Rock Paper Scissors: "The Watching" / "Nightmares" (2026)
- Rocket Power
  - "The Night Before" (1999)
- Rocko's Modern Life
  - "Sugar-Frosted Frights" / "Ed is Dead: A Thriller!" (1995)
- Rubble & Crew: "The Crew Fixes a Haunted House" / "The Crew Builds A Bat House" (2023)
- Rugrats
  - "Candy Bar Creep Show" / "Monster in the Garage" (1992)
  - "Ghost Story" (1999)
  - "Curse of the Werewuff" (2002)
- Rugrats
  - "The Werewoof Hunter" (2021)
  - "Night Crawler/Goblets & Goblins" (2022)
- Salute Your Shorts
  - "Zeke the Plumber" (1991)
- Sam & Cat
  - "DollSitting" (2013)
- Sanjay and Craig:
  - "Tufflips' Tales of Terror" (2014)
  - "Halloweenies" (2016)
- Santiago of the Seas
  - "The Mysterious Island" / Mystery of the Vam-Pirates (2021)
  - "Peek-a-BOO!"/"Night of the Witches" (2022)
- School Of Rock:
  - "Welcome To My Nightmare" (2016)
- Shimmer and Shine
  - "A Very Genie Halloweeny" (2015)
- Side Hustle
  - "Scare Bear" (2020)
- The Smurfs
  - "The Scariest Smurf" (2021)
  - "The Magic Pumpkin" (2022)
  - "Smurf Racers" (2023)
- SpongeBob SquarePants
  - "Scaredy Pants" / "I Was a Teenage Gary" (1999)
  - "Graveyard Shift" (2002)
  - "Ghost Host" (2006)
  - "The Curse of Bikini Bottom" (2009)
  - "Ghoul Fools" (2011)
  - "Don't Look Now" / "Seance Shmeance" (2013)
  - "The Legend of Boo-Kini Bottom" (2017)
  - "Krabby Patty Creature Feature" (2017)
  - "The Night Patty" (2018)
  - "The Ghost of Plankton" (2019)
  - "A Cabin in the Kelp" (2019)
  - "Squidferatu" / "Slappy Daze" (2022)
  - "Kreepaway Kamp" (2024)
- Sunny Day
  - "Pumpkin Pursuit" (2017)
- Supah Ninjas
  - "X" (2011)
- The Secret World of Alex Mack
  - "The Secret" (1995)
- Team Umizoomi: "The Ghost Family Costume Party" (2010)
- Teenage Mutant Ninja Turtles
  - "The Curse of Savanti Romero" (2017)
  - "The Crypt of Dracula" (2017)
  - "The Frankenstein Experiment" (2017)
  - "Monsters Among Us" (2017)
- That Girl Lay Lay:
  - "Ha-Lay-Lay-Ween" (2021)
  - "Freaky Fri-Day-Day" (2022)
- The Thundermans:
  - "The Haunted Thundermans" (2014)
  - "Happy Heroween" (2016)
- T.U.F.F. Puppy:
  - "The Curse of King Mutt" (2011)
  - "Happy Howl-o-Ween" (2012)
  - "Hide and Ghost Seek" (2015)
- Unfiltered: Happy Slime-o-ween! (2020)
- Victorious
  - "Terror on Cupcake Street" (2011)
- Wallykazam!
  - "Mustache Day" (2014)
- Wayside
  - "Rat in Shining Armor" (2007)
  - "Be True to Your Elf" (2007)
- Weinerville
  - "The Weinerville Halloween Special" (1993)
- Wild Grinders:
  - Wild Zombies/Scream a Little Scream (2012)
  - Texas Skateboard Horrorland Zombie Activity 3, Parts 1 & 2 (2013)
- The Wild Thornberrys:
  - "Blood Sisters" (1998)
  - "Spirited Away" (2000)
- Winx Club
  - "The Fourth Witch" (2006)
- Wonder Pets!
  - "Save the Black Kitten!" (2006)
- Wow! Wow! Wubbzy!:
  - "Monster Madness" / The Last Leaf (2006)
  - "The Ghost of Wuzzleburg" / March of the Pumpkins (2008)
- Yo Gabba Gabba!
  - "Halloween" (2007)
- You Can't Do That on Television
  - "Halloween" (1984)
- Young Dylan:
  - "Haunted Hills" (2021)
  - "Saturday School" (2022)
  - "The Wilson Family" (2023)
- Zoey 101
  - "Haunted House" (2005)

===== PAW Patrol =====
- "Pups and the Ghost Pirate" (2013)
- "Pups Save a Ghost" / "Pups Save a Show" (2014)
- "Pups Save a Sniffle" / "Pups and the Ghost Cabin" (2015)
- "Mission PAW: Royally Spooked" / "Pups Save Monkey-Dinger" (2017)
- "Pups Save the Trick-or-Treaters" / "Pups Save an Out of Control Mini Patrol" (2018)
- "Pups and the Werepuppy" / "Pups Save a Sleepwalking Mayor" (2018)
- "Pups Rescue a Rescuer" / "Pups Save the Phantom of the Frog Pond" (2020)
- "Pups vs. Ouchy Paws" / "Pups Save a Glow-in-the-Dark Party" (2021)
- "Pups Stop the Return of Humsquatch" / "Pups Save a Lonely Ghost" (2022)

===== Animaniacs =====
- Animaniacs (1993):
  - (Season 1, Episode 29): Hot, Bothered & Bedeviled / Moon Over Minerva (1993)
  - (Season 1, Episode 30): Draculee, Draculaa / Phranken-Runt (1993)
  - (Season 1, Episode 62): Scare Happy Slappy / Witch One / MacBeth (1994)
- Animaniacs (2020): (Season 1, Episode 11) Phantomaniacs | Fear and Laughter in Burbank | Bride of Pinky | Things That Go Bump in the Night (2020)
- Pinky and the Brain: (Season 3, Episode 17) A Pinky and the Brain Halloween (1997)

===== Looney Tunes =====
- Bugs Bunny's Howl-oween Special (1977, CBS)
- Tiny Toon Adventures:
  - "Tiny Toons Night Ghoulery" (1994)
- Baby Looney Tunes
  - "A Mid-Autumn Night's Scream" (2005)
- New Looney Tunes:
  - "The IMPoster" (2016)
  - "Duck Duck Ghost" (2018)
- Looney Tunes Cartoons:
  - "Boo! Appetweet" (2020)
  - "Postalgeist" (2021)
  - "Bugs Bunny’s Howl-O-Skreem Spooktacular" (2022)

===== Scooby-Doo =====
- The Scooby-Doo Show:
  - "The Headless Horseman of Halloween" (1976)
  - "To Switch a Witch" (1978)
- The New Scooby and Scrappy-Doo Show
  - "A Halloween Hassle at Dracula's Castle" (1984)
- Scooby-Doo Meets the Boo Brothers (1987)
- A Pup Named Scooby-Doo
  - "Ghost Who's Coming to Dinner?" (1988)
- The Scooby-Doo Project (1999)
- What's New, Scooby-Doo?
  - "A Scooby-Doo Halloween" (2003)
- Scooby-Doo! and the Goblin King (2008)
- Scooby-Doo! and the Spooky Scarecrow (2013)
- Be Cool, Scooby-Doo!
  - "Halloween" (2017)
- Happy Halloween, Scooby-Doo! (2020)
- Trick or Treat Scooby-Doo! (2022)

==== Others ====
===== Lois & Clark: The New Adventures of Superman =====
- "When Irish Eyes Are Killing" (1995)
- "Never on Sunday" (1996)
- "Ghosts" (1996)

===== The Halloween Tree =====
In 1993, Hanna-Barbera produced a made-for-television animated adaptation of Ray Bradbury's classic novel of the same name. Featuring narration by the author himself, the movie explains some of the history of the holiday as experienced via an across-time adventure with a group of trick-or-treating kids. The hand-painted backgrounds, haunting music of John Debney, and Bradbury's narration elevate this to much more than a mere children's Halloween special.

===== Anime =====
- Ouran High School Host Club Until the Day it Becomes a Pumpkin! (2006)
- Odd Taxi: "Trick or Treat" (2021)

=== Thanksgiving television specials ===
==== Children's/family ====
- Adventures from the Book of Virtues: Generosity (1997)
- Allegra's Window: Mitten Weather (1995)
- Alvin and the Chipmunks: Alvin’s Thanksgiving Celebration (2008)
- Amphibia: The Big Bugball Game (2019)
- Angela Anaconda: No Thanksgiving (2000)
- Animaniacs: Turkey Jerky (1993)
- As Told By Ginger: Ten Chairs (2004)
- B.C.: The First Thanksgiving (1973)
- Barbie: Turkey Trouble (2022)
- Bear in the Big Blue House: The Best Thanksgiving Ever (1999)
- The Berenstain Bears: The Prize Pumpkin (2003)
- The Berenstain Bears Meet Bigpaw (1980)
- The Big Comfy Couch: Feast of Fools (1993)
- Blue's Clues: Thankful (1999)
- Blue's Clues & You!: Thankful with Blue (2020)
- Bobby's World: Generics and Indians (1997)
- Bozo, Gar and Ray: WGN TV Classics (2005)
- Bubble Guppies: Gobble Gobble Guppies! (2014)
- Butterbean's Cafe: Fairy Happy Thanksgiving / Cricket's The Boss! (2018)
- Caillou: Caillou's Thanksgiving (2000)
- Calvin and the Colonel: Thanksgiving Dinner (1961)
- The Care Bears: Grams Bear's Thanksgiving Surprise (1986)
- Carolesdaughter: Violent (2021)
- Casper the Friendly Ghost: Do or Diet (1953)
- CatDog: Talking Turkey (1999)
- Clarence: Chadsgiving (2017)
- Clifford's Puppy Days: Fall Feast / The Perfect Pancake (2005/2006)
- Craig of the Creek: Craig and the Kid's Table (2019)
- Cyberchase: Giving Thanks Day (2019)
- Daniel Tiger's Neighborhood: Thank You, Grandpere Tiger!/Neighborhood Thank You Day (2012)
- Davey and Goliath: The Pilgrim Boy (1962)
- Doctor Dolittle: The great turkey race (1970)
- Dora the Explorer: Dora's Thanksgiving Day Parade (2012)
- Doug: Doug's Thanksgiving (1997)
- The Emperor's New School: "Cornivale" (2008)
- Fluppy Dogs (1986)
- Garfield's Thanksgiving (1989)
- Get Rolling with Otis: The Thankful Parade / Hay Day Hay Maze (2021)
- Harriet the Spy: The Walrus and the Carpenter (2023)
- Harvey Beaks: Yampions (2015)
- Henry Hugglemonster: Huggsgiving Day (2013)
- Hey Arnold: Arnold's Thanksgiving (1998)
- The High Fructose Adventures of Annoying Orange: Thanksfornothing Day (2013)
- The Huckleberry Hound Show: Grim Pilgrim (1959)
- House of Mouse: House of Turkey (2003)
- Intergalactic Thanksgiving (1979)
- Jay Jay the Jet Plane: Snuffy's Thanksgiving (2001)
- JoJo's Circus: The Thanksgiving Hip-Hooray Parade (2005)
- Life with Louie (Season 1, Episode 9): The Fourth Thursday in November (1995)
- Loopy De Loop: Drum-Sticked (1963)
- MAD: Bourne Leg-a-Turkey/Pilgrimm (2012)
- Martha Speaks: Martha's Thanksgiving (2012)
- Maya & Miguel: The Best Thanksgiving Ever (2005)
- Megas XLR: Thanksgiving Throwdown (2004)
- Mickey Mouse: Mixed-Up Adventures: Mickey's Thanksgiving Family Fun Race / Happy Thanksgiving Helpers! (2019)
- Minnie's Bow-Toons: Turkey Time (2014)
- The Mighty B: Thanksgiving Beeninactment (2008)
- Molly of Denali: Thanks-for-giving (2024)
- Mouse on the Mayflower (1968)
- The Muppet Show (Arlo Guthrie, 1979)
- My Gym Partner's a Monkey: A Thanksgiving Carol (2008)
- My Little Pony: Friends Are Never Far Away (2005)
- Peppa Pig: Thanksgiving (2024)
- Peppa Pig Tales: Happy Thanksgiving
- Pepper Ann: Thanksgiving Dad (1997)
- Pinkalicious & Peterrific: A Fairy Thanksgiving (2020)
- The Pink Panther: Pilgrim Panther (1993)
- Planet Sheen: Thanksgetting (2010)
- Pocoyo: You Are Welcome for Thanksgiving (2018)
- Popeye the Sailor: Pilgrim Popeye (1951)
- Pupstruction: Petsgiving At PawPaw’s (2024)
- Raw Toonage: Gobble Gobble Bonkers (1993)
- The Real Ghostbusters: The Revenge of Murray the Mantis (1987)
- Recess (Season 1, Episode 22): The Great Can Drive (1997)
- Regular Show: The Thanksgiving Special (2013)
- Rocko's Modern Life: Turkey Time/Floundering Fathers (1996)
- Sago Mini Friends: Happy Thankful Day (2022)
- Saturday Supercade: Q*bert: Thanksgiving For the Memories (1983)
- Shining Time Station: Billy's Party (1993)
- The Shnookums & Meat Funny Cartoon Show: What a Turkey! (1995)
- Skylanders Academy: Thankstaking For the Memories (2017)
- So Weird: "Earth 101" (2000)
- The Spectacular Spider-Man: Nature vs. Nurture (2008)
- Stanley: A Turkey of a Thanksgiving (2004)
- Steven Universe: Gem Harvest (2016)
- Tennessee Tuxedo and His Tales: The Romance of Plymouth Rock (1965)
- Teacher's Pet: The Turkey That Came to Dinner (2002)
- Teletubbies: Handshapes-Turkey (1999)
- Teletubbies Let's Go: A Very Special Meal/Noo-Noo Eats All The Tubby Custard (2023)
- Thanksgiving in the Land of Oz (1980)
- A Thanksgiving Tale (1983)
- The Thanksgiving That Almost Wasn't (1972)
- Toon Heads: Turkey Toons (1999)
- T.O.T.S.: Totsgiving (2020)
- Trolls: The Beat Goes On!: "Funsgiving" (2019)
- The Turkey Caper (1985)
- Turkey Hollow (2015)
- Underdog: Simon Says No Thanksgiving (1965)
- Wild Kratts: Happy Turkey Day (2012)
- The Wild Thornberrys: A Family Tradition (2000)
- Wordgirl: Guess Who's Coming to Thanksgiving Dinner (2014)

==== Arthur ====
- Francine's Pilfered Paper (2007)
- An Arthur Thanksgiving (2020)

==== Big City Greens ====
- Big Deal / Forbidden Feline (2018)
- Harvest Dinner (2019)
- Turkey Trouble (2024)

==== Looney Tunes ====
- Tom Turk and Daffy (1944)
- Holiday for Drumsticks (1949)
- Bugs Bunny's Thanksgiving Diet (1979/CBS)
- Daffy Duck's Thanks-for-Giving Special (1980/CBS)
- The Sylvester & Tweety Mysteries: Happy Pranksgiving (1997)
- New Looney Tunes: No Thanks Giving (2019)
- Looney Tunes Cartoons: Pilgwim's Pwogress (2022)

==== The Loud House/The Casagrandes ====
- The Loudest Thanksgiving (2018)
- The Loud House Thanksgiving Special (2022)
- Cursed (2020)

==== Max & Ruby ====
- Max's Thanksgiving (2004)
- Max and Ruby Give Thanks (2012)

==== The Patrick Star Show ====
- Blorpsgiving (2023)
- Thanks But No Thanksgiving (2024)

==== PAW Patrol/Rubble & Crew ====
- Pups Save Thanksgiving / Pups Save a Windy Bay (2018)
- The Crew Celebrates BuilderCovegiving Day / The Crew Builds a Rocket Ship Ride (2024)

==== Peanuts (Charlie Brown) ====
- A Charlie Brown Thanksgiving (1973)
- This Is America, Charlie Brown: The Mayflower Voyagers (1988)
- Peanuts (TV series): Good Dog/Woodstock (2016)

==== Puppy Dog Pals ====
- Turkey on the Town / Friendship Feast (2019)
- Pups on Parade / Pop's Promise (2020)
- A Very Berry Friendship Feast / Nature Pillow Pups (2022)

==== Rugrats/All Grown Up ====
- The Turkey Who Came to Dinner (1997)
- R.V. Having Fun Yet? (2005)

==== Sesame Street ====
- Episode 4801: A Sesame Street Thanksgiving (2017)
- See Us Coming Together (2021)

==== Strawberry Shortcake: Berry in the Big City ====
- Berry Bounty Banquet: Part One / Berry Bounty Banquet: Part Two (2021)
- Berry Bounty Bust (2023)

==== Teen Titans Go! ====
- Thanksgiving (2014)
- Thanksgetting (2017)
- A Doom Patrol Thanksgiving (2021)
- The Wishbone (2023)

==== The Tiny Chef Show ====
- Fwendsgiving (2023)
- Fwendsgiving Feast (2024)

==== Tom and Jerry ====
- The Little Orphan (1949)
- The Tom and Jerry Show: Turkey Tom (2021)

==== Winnie the Pooh ====
- Welcome to Pooh Corner: Pooh Corner Thanksgiving (1983)
- A Winnie the Pooh Thanksgiving (1998)
- Seasons of Giving (1999)
- My Friends Tigger & Pooh: Many Thanks for Christopher Robin (2007)

==== Disney Channel, Disney XD and Playhouse Disney ====
- Doraemon: Gadget Cat from the Future:
  - "What Day is it Today" (Season 1, Episode 25B) (2014)
  - "Snowkid on the Block" (Season 2, Episode 12B) (2015)
- Imagination Movers:
  - "Present Problem" (Season 1, Episode 21) (2008)
  - "Happy Ha Ha Holidays!" (Season 2, Episode 9) (2009)
  - "A Little Elf Esteem" (Season 3, Episode 10) (2011)

==== Nickelodeon/Nick Jr. ====
- Allegra's Window:
  - "Waiting for Grandma" (Season 1, Episode 17) (1994)
  - "Mr. Cook's Christmas" (Season 3, Episode 12) (1996)
- Blue's Clues:
  - "Blue's Big Holiday" (Season 3, Episode 9) (1999)
  - "Blue's First Holiday" (Season 5, Episode 36) (2003)
- Blue's Clues & You!:
  - "Blue's Night Before Christmas" (Season 2, Episode 8) (2020)
  - "A Blue's Clues Festival of Lights" (Season 3, Episode 4) (2021)
  - "Blue's Snowy Day Surprise" (Season 3, Episode 5) (2021)
  - "A Blue Christmas with You" (Season 4, Episode 6) (2022)
- Blue's Room: "Holiday Wishes" (Season 1, Episode 3) (2004)
- Eureeka's Castle: "Christmas at Eureeka's" (Season 1, Episode 20) (1989)
- The Fresh Beat Band: "Fresh Beats in Toyland" (Season 2, Episode 7) (2010)
- Gullah Gullah Island: "A Gullah Gullah Christmas" (Season 2, Episode 19) (1996)
- LazyTown:
  - "Surprise Santa" (Season 1, Episode 29) (2005)
  - "The Holiday Spirit" (Season 3, Episode 13) (2013)
- Ryan's Mystery Playdate: "Ryan's Merry Playdate" (Season 2, Episode 10) (2019)
- The Tiny Chef Show: The Marvelous Mish Mash Special (2023)
- The Wubbulous World of Dr. Seuss: "Mrs. Zabarelli's Holiday Baton" (Season 1, Episode 8) (1996)
- Yo Gabba Gabba!:
  - "Christmas" (Season 1, Episode 18) (2007)
  - "A Very Awesome Christmas" (Season 4, Episode 3) (2011)

==== Animation ====
===== Cartoon Network/Boomerang/Discovery Family =====
- Adventure Time:
  - "Holly Jolly Secrets" (Season 3, Episodes 19-20) (2011)
  - "The More You Moe, The Moe You Know" (Season 7, Episode 14) (2015)
- The Adventures of Chuck and Friends:
  - "Up All Night/Boomer the Snowplow" (Season 1, Episode 8) (2010)
  - "The Regifters" (Season 2, Episode 12) (2011)
- Almost Naked Animals:
  - "The Ear Wax Elf" (Season 1, Episode 5) (2011)
  - "The Perfect Gift/Home for the Howiedays" (Season 1, Episode 26) (2011)
- The Amazing World of Gumball:
  - "Christmas" (Season 2, Episode 15) (2012)
  - "The Lie" (Season 3, Episode 26) (2014)
- Apple & Onion:
  - "Christmas Spirit" (Season 2, Episode 10) (2020)
- Atomic Betty:
  - "Jingle Brawls / Toy Hystoryia" (Season 1, Episode 25) (2005)
  - "The No-L 9" (Season 2, Episode 8) (2005)
- Batman: The Brave and the Bold:
  - "Invasion of the Secret Santas!" (Season 1, Episode 4) (2008)
- Batwheels:
  - "Holidays on Ice" (Season 1, Episode 17) (2022)
  - "The Great Christmas Caper" (Season 2, Episode 21) (2024)
- Ben 10 (2005 TV series):
  - "Merry Christmas" (Season 3, Episode 4) (2006)
- Ben 10 (2016 TV series):
  - "The Feels" (Season 2, Episode 28) (2018)
- Camp Lazlo:
  - "Kamp Kringle" (Season 5, Episode 9) (2007)
- Care Bears: Welcome to Care-a-Lot:
  - "Holiday Hics" (Season 1, Episode 12) (2012)
  - "Holi-Stage" (Season 1, Episode 24) (2012)
- Casper's Scare School:
  - "Merry Scary Christmas" (Season 1, Episode 11) (2009)
- Chowder:
  - "Hey, Hey It's Knishmas!" (Season 2, Episode 7) (2008)
- Clarence:
  - "Merry Moochmas" (Season 2, Episode 37) (2016)
- Class of 3000:
  - "The Class of 3000 Christmas Special" (Season 2, Episode 9-10) (2007)
- Code Lyoko:
  - "Cold War" (Season 2, Episode 19) (2005)
  - "Distant Memory" (Season 4, Episode 16) (2007)
- Codename: Kids Next Door:
  - "Operation: N.A.U.G.H.T.Y." (Season 5, Episode 2) (2005)
- Courage the Cowardly Dog:
  - "The Snowman Cometh" (Season 1, Episode 10 Part 1) (2000)
  - "Snowman's Revenge" (Season 3, Episode 11 Part 2) (2002)
  - "The Nutcracker" (Season 4, Episode 1 Part 2) (2002)
- Craig of the Creek:
  - "Snow Day" (Season 3, Episode 18) (2020)
  - "Winter Break" (Season 3, Episode 19) (2021)
  - "Winter Creeklympics" (Season 3, Episode 22) (2021)
  - "Locked Out Cold" (Season 4, Episode 2) (2021)
- Dan Vs.:
  - "The Mall Santa" (Season 2, Episode 2) (2011)
- Dexter's Laboratory:
  - "Dexter vs. Santa's Claws" (Season 2, Episode 47c) (1998)
  - "Trapped With a Vengeance" (Season 2, Episode 50b) (1998)
  - "A Mom Cartoon" (Season 3, Episode 13b) (2002)
- Dorothy and the Wizard of Oz:
  - "Dorothy's Christmas in Oz" (2018)
- Ed, Edd n Eddy:
  - "Fa, La, La, La, Ed" (Season 2, Episode 13) (2000)
  - "Ed, Edd n Eddy's Jingle Jingle Jangle" (2004)
- Evil Con Carne:
  - "Christmas Con Carne" (Season 1, Episode 8 Part 3) (2002)
- Foster's Home for Imaginary Friends:
  - "A Lost Claus" (Season 3, Episode 10) (2005)
- The Garfield Show:
  - "Caroling Capers" (Season 1, Episode 20 Part 1) (2009)
  - "Home for the Holidays" (Season 2, Episode 1) (2010)
- George of the Jungle:
  - "Jungle Bells/The Goats of Christmas Presents" (Season 1, Episode 23) (2007)
- G.I. Joe: Renegades:
  - "Homecoming, Parts 1 & 2" (Season 1, Episode 11 & 12) (2010)
- The Grim Adventures of Billy & Mandy:
  - "A Dumb Wish" (Season 1, Episode 13 Part 3) (2001)
  - "Billy and Mandy Save Christmas" (Season 4, Episode 14) (2005)
- Hero: 108:
  - "Dog Castle" (Season 1, Episode 10) (2010)
- The Heroic Quest of the Valiant Prince Ivandoe:
  - "The Prince and The Lonely Trollstress" (Season 5, Episode 3) (2023)
- The High Fructose Adventures of Annoying Orange:
  - "The Annoying Orange Generic Holiday Special" (Season 1, Episode 19) (2012)
  - "Orange Carol" (Season 1, Episode 20) (2012)
  - "Fruitsy the Snowfruit" (Season 2, Episode 21) (2013)
- I Am Weasel:
  - "Happy Baboon Holidays" (Season 1, Episode 11) (1997)
  - "IR's First Bike" (Season 5, Episode 4) (1999)
- Johnny Bravo:
  - "'Twas the Night" (Season 1, Episode 5) (1997)
  - "A Johnny Bravo Christmas" (Season 3, Episode 18) (2001)
- Justice League:
  - "Comfort and Joy" (Season 2, Episode 23) (2003)
- Krypto the Superdog:
  - "Storybook Holiday" (Season 1, Episode 2) (2005)
- Littlest Pet Shop (2012):
  - "Winter Wonder Wha…?" (Season 3, Episode 14) (2014)
  - "Snow Stormin'" (Season 3, Episode 15) (2014)
- MAD:
  - "Da Grinchy Code/Duck" (Season 1, Episode 12) (2010)
  - "FROST/Undercover Claus" (Season 2, Episode 15) (2011)
  - "Fantastic Four Christmases/Red & White Collar" (Season 3, Episode 20) (2012)
- The Marvelous Misadventures of Flapjack:
  - "Low Tidings" (Season 2, Episode 12) (2009)
- The Mr. Men Show:
  - "Snow" (Season 1, Episode 32) (2008)
- My Gym Partner's a Monkey:
  - "Have Yourself a Joyful Little Animas" (Season 2, Episode 9) (2006)
- OK K.O.! Let's Be Heroes:
  - "Super Black Friday" (Season 2, Episode 20) (2018)
- Pink Panther and Pals:
  - "Chilled to the Pink" (Season 1, Episode 13a) (2010)
- Pound Puppies (2010):
  - "I Heard the Barks on Christmas Eve" (Season 2, Episode 13) (2012)
- Robotboy:
  - "Christmas Evil" (Season 1, Episode 10b) (2005)
- Scaredy Squirrel:
  - "Lumberjack Day" (Season 1, Episode 5) (2011)
- Secret Millionaires Club:
  - "Just Say Snow!" (Season 1, Episode 16) (2013)
- Sheep in the Big City:
  - "Home for the Baa-lidays" (Season 1, Episode 6) (2000)
- Sidekick:
  - "Beneath the Missile-Toe/Ice to Know You" (Season 1, Episode 16) (2010)
- Space Ghost Coast to Coast:
  - "A Space Ghost Christmas" (Season 1, Episode 12) (1994)
  - "Waiting for Edward" (Season 5, Episode 11) (1998)
- Steven Universe:
  - "Winter Forecast" (Season 1, Episode 42) (2015)
  - "Maximum Capacity" (Season 1, Episode 43) (2015)
  - "Three Gems and a Baby" (Season 4, Episode 9) (2016)
- Steven Universe Future:
  - "Snow Day" (Season 1, Episode 7) (2019)
- Strawberry Shortcake's Berry Bitty Adventures:
  - "Happy First Frost" (Season 1, Episode 19) (2010)
  - "The Berry Long Winter" (Season 2, Episode 10) (2012)
  - "The Big Freeze" (Season 2, Episode 11) (2012)
  - "On Ice" (Season 2, Episode 12) (2012)
- ThunderCats Roar:
  - "Mandora Saves Christmas" (Season 1, Episode 52) (2020)
- The Tom and Jerry Show:
  - "The Plight Before Christmas" (Season 1, Episode 28) (2014)
  - "Tom and Jerry: Santa's Little Helpers" (2014)
  - "Dragon Down the Holidays" (Season 2, Episode 15) (2017)
- Totally Spies!:
  - "Evil G.L.A.D.I.S. much?" (Season 3, Episode 14) (2004)
  - Ho-Ho-Ho-No!" (Season 5, Episode 23) (2010)
- Transformers: Animated:
  - "Human Error, Parts 1 & 2" (Season 3, Episode 8 & 9) (2007)
- Transformers: Rescue Bots:
  - "Christmas in July" (Season 1, Episode 9) (2012)
  - "The Riders of Midwinter" (Season 3, Episode 9) (2014)
- Transformers: Rescue Bots Academy:
  - "The Ice Wave" (Season 1, Episode 50) (2019)
- The Twisted Whiskers Show:
  - "Mister Mewser's Holiday Spectacular" (Season 1, Episode 26) (2010)
- Uncle Grandpa:
  - "Christmas Special" (Season 1, Episode 41) (2014)
  - "Secret Santa" (Season 2, Episode 23) (2015)
  - "Chill Out" (Season 4, Episode 9) (2016)
- Unikitty!:
  - "No Day Like Snow Day" (Season 1, Episode 3) (2017)
  - "Top of the Naughty List" (Season 1, Episode 39) (2018)
- Wacky Races (2017):
  - "It's a Wacky Life" (Season 1, Episode 18) (2017)
  - "Dashing Thru the Snow" (Season 1, Episode 20) (2017)
  - "Signed, Sealed, and Wacky" (Season 2, Episode 24) (2018)
- We Bare Bears:
  - "Christmas Parties" (Season 2, Episode 23) (2016)
  - "The Perfect Tree" (Season 3, Episode 36) (2017)
  - "Christmas Movies" (Season 4, Episode 25) (2018)
- What a Cartoon!:
  - "George and Junior's Christmas Spectacular" (Episode 14) (1995)

===== 6teen =====
- "Deck the Mall" (Season 1, Episode 5) (2004)
- "In A Retail Wonderland" (Season 2, Episode 8) (2005)
- "Snow Job" (Season 2, Episode 27) (2006)
- "How the Rent-A-Cop Stole Christmas" (Season 3, Episode 12) (2007)

===== My Little Pony: Friendship Is Magic =====
- "Hearth's Warming Eve" (Season 2, Episode 11) (2011)
- "Hearthbreakers" (Season 5, Episode 20) (2015)
- "A Hearth's Warming Tail" (Season 6, Episode 8) (2016)
- "The Hearth's Warming Club" (Season 8, Episode 15) (2018)
- "My Little Pony: Best Gift Ever" (2018)

===== The Powerpuff Girls =====
- "'Twas the Fight Before Christmas" (2003)
- "Snow Month" (Season 1, Episode 47) (2016)
- "You're a Good Man, Mojo Jojo!" (Season 2, Episode 29) (2017)
- "The Gift" (Season 3, Episode 22) (2018)

===== Regular Show =====
- "The Christmas Special" (Season 4, Episode 9) (2012)
- "New Year's Kiss" (Season 5, Episode 14) (2013)
- "White Elephant Gift Exchange" (Season 6, Episode 9) (2014)
- "Merry Christmas Mordecai" (Season 6, Episode 10) (2014)
- "Snow Tubing" (Season 7, Episode 18) (2015)
- "Christmas in Space" (Season 8, Episode 23) (2016)

===== Teen Titans Go! =====
- "Second Christmas" (Season 1, Episode 35) (2013)
- "The True Meaning of Christmas" (Season 3, Episode 19) (2015)
- "Halloween v Christmas" (Season 4, Episode 2) (2015)
- "Teen Titans Save Christmas" (Season 4, Episode 6) (2016)
- "Beast Boy on a Shelf" (Season 6, Episode 3) (2019)
- "Christmas Crusaders" (Season 6, Episode 4) (2019)
- "A Holiday Story" (Season 7, Episode 32) (2021)
- "The Great Holiday Escape" (Season 8, Episode 2) (2022)
- "Christmas Magic" (Season 8, Episode 27) (2023)

===== Total Drama =====
- Total Drama World Tour:
  - "Anything Yukon Do, I Can Do Better" (Season 3, Episode 4) (2010)
  - "Slap Slap Revolution" (Season 3, Episode 7) (2010)
  - "Sweden Sour" (Season 3, Episode 17) (2010)
- Total Drama: Revenge of the Island:
  - "Ice Ice Baby" (Season 4, Episode 3) (2012)
- Total DramaRama:
  - "Snow Way Out" (Season 1, Episode 28) (2018)
  - "Me, My Elf, and I" (Season 2, Episode 34) (2020)
  - "Snow Country for Old Men" (Season 2, Episode 37) (2020)
  - "The Tree Stooges Save Christmas" (Season 3, Episode 36 & 37) (2021)

==== Disney Channel/Jetix/Disney XD/Disney+ ====
- The 7D:
  - "Gingersnaps and Grumpy Snaps/Jollybells" (Season 1, Episode 18) (2014)
- 101 Dalmatians: The Series:
  - "A Christmas Cruella" (Season 1, Episode 49) (1997)
- American Dragon: Jake Long:
  - "Hairy Christmas" (Season 2, Episode 16) (2006)
- Amphibia:
  - "Froggy Little Christmas" (Season 3, Episode 9) (2021)
- Atomic Puppet:
  - "Snow Maniac/Hero's Holiday" (Season 1, Episode 18) (2017)
- Big City Greens:
  - "Green Christmas" (Season 2, Episode 4) (2019)
  - "Big Resolution/Winter Greens" (Season 2, Episode 23) (2021)
  - "Virtually Christmas" (Season 3, Episode 29) (2022)
  - "Dream Tree/Blue Greens" (Season 4, Episode 12) (2024)
- Big Hero 6: The Series:
  - "The Present" (Season 2, Episode 18) (2019)
- Brandy & Mr. Whiskers:
  - "On Whiskers, On Lola, On Cheryl and Meryl" (Season 1, Episode 13) (2004)
- Buzz Lightyear of Star Command:
  - "Holiday Time" (Season 1, Episode 59) (2000)
- Chip 'n' Dale: Park Life:
  - "Park Life Holiday" (Season 2, Episode 13) (2023)
- Counterfeit Cat:
  - "Merry Christmax" (Season 1, Episode 12) (2016)
  - "Low Resolutions" (Season 1, Episode 24) (2016)
- Doug:
  - "Doug's Secret Christmas" (Season 1, Episode 15) (1996)
- DuckTales (2017):
  - "Last Christmas!" (Season 2, Episode 6) (2018)
  - "How Santa Stole Christmas!" (Season 3, Episode 18) (2020)
- Elena of Avalor:
  - "Navidad" (Season 1, Episode 11) (2016)
  - "Snow Place Like Home" (Season 2, Episode 19) (2018)
  - "Festival Of Lights" (Season 3, Episode 17) (2019)
- The Emperor's New School:
  - "A Giftmas Story" (Season 2, Episode 12) (2007)
- Fish Hooks:
  - "Merry Fishmas, Milo" (Season 2, Episode 24) (2011)
- The Ghost and Molly McGee:
  - "Festival of Lights/Saving Christmas" (Season 1, Episode 10) (2021)
  - "Ice Princess/Ready, Set, Snow!" (Season 1, Episode 11) (2022)
  - "White Christmess" (Season 2, Episode 19) (2023)
- Guardians of the Galaxy (TV series):
  - "Jingle Bell Rock" (Season 1, Episode 26) (2016)
- Hailey's On It!:
  - "We Wish You a Merry Chaos-mas" (Season 1, Episode 20) (2023)
- House of Mouse:
  - "Pete's Christmas Caper" (Season 1, Episode 19) (2003)
  - "Clarabelle's Christmas List" (Season 1, Episode 29) (2003)
- Hotel Transylvania: The Series:
  - "The Fright Before Creepmas" (Season 1, Episode 18) (2017)
  - "A Year Without Creepmas" (Season 2, Episode 14) (2019)
- Hulk and the Agents of S.M.A.S.H.:
  - "It's a Wonderful Smash" (Season 1, Episode 26) (2014)
- Jimmy Two-Shoes
  - "A Cold Day in Miseryville" (Season 1, Episode 5) (2009)
  - "Snowrilla" (Season 2, Episode 19) (2011)
- Kick Buttowski: Suburban Daredevil:
  - "A Cousin Kyle Christmas/Snow Problem" (Season 2, Episode 17) (2011)
- Kid vs. Kat:
  - "Christmas Special Part 1 & 2" (Season 1, Episode 17) (2009)
- Kiff
  - "Halfway There Day" (Season 1, Episode 8) (2023)
- Kim Possible:
  - "A Very Possible Christmas" (Season 2, Episode 16) (2003)
- Lilo & Stitch: The Series:
  - "Topper: Experiment 025" (Season 1, Episode 21) (2003)
- Lloyd In Space:
  - "Cheery Theerlap, Lloyd" (Season 2, Episode 8) (2001)
- Mickey Mouse:
  - "Dancevidaniya" (Season 3, Episode 12) (2016)
  - "Duck the Halls: A Mickey Mouse Christmas Special" (Season 3, Episode 58) (2016)
- Mickey Mouse Works:
  - "The Nutcracker" (Season 1, Episode 13) (1999)
- Milo Murphy's Law:
  - "A Christmas Peril" (Season 1, Episode 20) (2017)
- Pac-Man and the Ghostly Adventures:
  - "Happy Holidays and a Merry Berry Day" (Season 2, Episode 13) (2014)
  - "Santa-Pac" (Season 3, Episode 12) (2015)
- Packages from Planet X:
  - "Christmas Evil/True North Strong & Freezing" (Season 1, Episode 17) (2013)
- Penn Zero: Part-Time Hero:
  - "North Pole Down" (Season 1, Episode 1) (2014)
- Pepper Ann:
  - "A Kosher Christmas" (Season 3, Episode 6) (1998)
- Pickle and Peanut:
  - "Springtime for Christmas/Yellow Snow/A Cabbage Day Miracle" (Season 1, Episode 10) (2015)
  - Tree Lighting/A Merry Mocap Musical" (Season 2, Episode 17) (2017)
- The Proud Family:
  - "Seven Days of Kwanzaa" (Season 1, Episode 11) (2001)
- Randy Cunningham: 9th Grade Ninja:
  - "Silent Punch, Deadly Punch" (Season 1, Episode 15) (2012)
  - "Happy Hanukkah, Howard Weinerman/Snow Klahoma!" (Season 2, Episode 19) (2014)
- Rated A for Awesome:
  - "Melting the Ice" (Season 1, Episode 4) (2011)
  - "Silent Night, Awesome Night" (Season 1, Episode 36) (2011)
- The Replacements:
  - "Dick Daring's All-Star Holiday Stunt Spectacular V" (Season 3, Episode 22) (2008)
- Slugterra:
  - "Snowdance" (Season 2, Episode 2) (2013)
- Star vs. the Forces of Evil:
  - "Stump Day/Holiday Spellcial" (Season 3, Episode 14) (2017)
- Teamo Supremo:
  - "Happy Holidays, Mr. Gruff!" (Season 1, Episode 30) (2002)
- Ultimate Spider-Man:
  - "Nightmare on Christmas" (Season 3, Episode 22) (2014)
  - "The Moon Knight Before Christmas" (Season 4, Episode 24) (2016)
- Wander Over Yonder:
  - "The Little Guy" (Season 1, Episode 7) (2013)
  - "The Gift" (Season 1, Episode 19) (2014)
- The Weekenders:
  - "The Worst Holiday Ever" (Season 3, Episode 13) (2001)
- Xiaolin Chronicles:
  - "Omi Saves the Holidays" (Season 1, Episode 21) (2015)
- Yin Yang Yo!
  - "Scarf It Up!" (Season 1, Episode 9) (2006)
  - "Season's Beatings" (Season 2, Episode 30) (2008)
- The ZhuZhus:
  - "Zhu Years Eve" (Season 1, Episode 9) (2017)
- Zombies: The Re-Animated Series:
  - "Santler Claws is Comin’ to Town" (Special, Episode 20) (2024)

===== The Disney Afternoon =====
- TaleSpin: "A Jolly Molly Christmas" (Season 1, Episode 43) (1990)
- Darkwing Duck: "It's a Wonderful Leaf" (Season 1, Episode 41) (1991)
- Goof Troop: "Have Yourself a Goofy Little Christmas" (1992)
- Bonkers: "Miracle at 34th Precinct" (Season 1, Episode 59) (1993)
- The Shnookums & Meat Funny Cartoon Show: "Jingle Bells, Something Smells" (Season 1, Episode 12a) (1995)
- The Lion King's Timon & Pumbaa: "Don't Be Elfish" (Season 3, Episode 28a) (1999)

===== Phineas and Ferb =====
- "S'Winter" (Season 1, Episode 3) (2008)
- "Phineas and Ferb Christmas Vacation" (Season 2, Episode 22) (2009)
- "A Phineas and Ferb Family Christmas" (Season 3, Episode 17) (2011)
- "For Your Ice Only/Happy New Year!" (Season 4, Episode 2) (2012)

===== Recess =====
- "Yes Mikey, Santa Does Shave" (Season 2, Episode 21) (1998)
- Recess Christmas: Miracle on Third Street (2001)

===== Teacher's Pet =====
- "A Dog For All Seasons" (Season 1, Episode 14) (2000)
- "The Blight Before Christmas" (Season 3, Episode 18) (2002)

===== Playhouse Disney/Disney Jr. =====
- Adventures in Wonderland: Christmas in Wonderland (Season 1, Episode 64) (1991)
- Alice's Wonderland Bakery
  - "The Gingerbread Palace" (Season 1, Episode 21) (2022)
  - "A Hat-Bachi Hanukkah" (Season 2, Episode 14) (2023)
- Ariel: "Flounder's Christmas Letter/Holiday Toy Box Trouble" (Season 1, Episode 18) (2024)
- Bear in the Big Blue House: "A Berry Bear Christmas" (Season 3, Episode 25-26) (1999)
- Charlie and Lola: "How Many More Minutes Until Christmas?" (Season 2, Episode 19) (2006)
- Doc McStuffins:
  - "A Very McStuffins Christmas" (Season 2, Episode 11) (2013)
  - "The Doc McStuffins Christmas Special" (Season 5, Episode 3) (2018)
- The Doodlebops: "Doodlebops Holiday Show" (Season 2, Episode 1) (2006)
- Eureka!: "Jingle Bog Rock" (Season 1, Episode 20A) (2022)
- Fancy Nancy: "Nancy and the Nice List" (Season 1, Episode 16) (2018)
- Firebuds:
  - "Hanukkah Hullabaloo/The Christmas Car-Sled Race" (Season 1, Episode 13) (2022)
  - "Blizzard Buds/Parade Escapade" (Season 2, Episode 5) (2023)
- Handy Manny:
  - "A Very Handy Holiday" (Season 1, Episode 15) (2006)
  - "Flicker Saves Christmas" (Season 3, Episode 17) (2010)
  - "The Ayala's Christmas Extravaganza" (Season 3, Episode 18) (2010)
- Henry Hugglemonster:
  - "Happy Hugglemas" (Season 1, Episode 22) (2013)
  - "Henry Hugglemonster's Very Special Hugglemas TV Special" (Season 2, Episode 22) (2015)
- Higglytown Heroes: "Twinkle's Wish" (Season 1, Episode 12) (2004)
- Jake and the Never Land Pirates:
  - "It's A Winter Never Land!/Hook on Ice!" (Season 1, Episode 24) (2011)
  - "Captain Scrooge!" (Season 3, Episode 25) (2014)
- Johnny and the Sprites: "Very Spritely Holiday/Sprites Snow Day" (Season 1, Episode 13) (2007)
- JoJo's Circus: "A Circus Town Christmas" (Season 1, Episode 18) (2003)
- Jungle Junction: "The Night Before Zipsmas/A Gift for Zooter" (Season 1, Episode 13) (2009)
- Kindergarten: The Musical: "A Winter's Walrus/One Holiday More" (Season 1, Episode 14) (2024)
- Little Einsteins:
  - "The Christmas Wish" (Season 1, Episode 15) (2005)
  - "The Wind-Up Toy Prince" (Season 2, Episode 20) (2007)
- Me & Mickey:
  - "Decorating for Christmas" (2023)
  - "Dreidel Play" (2023)
- Mickey and the Roadster Racers:
  - "Happy Hot Diggity Holiday/Happy Holiday Helpers" (Season 1, Episode 23) (2017)
  - "Snow-Go With the Flow/Happy Helpers on Ice!" (Season 2, Episode 16) (2018)
- Mickey Mouse Clubhouse: "Mickey Saves Santa" (Season 1, Episode 20) (2006)
- Mickey Mouse Funhouse:
  - "Santa's Crash Landing" (Season 2, Episode 25) (2023)
  - "Nochebuena At the Funhouse/Hanukkah At Hilda's" (Season 3, Episode 19) (2024)
- Miles from Tomorrowland: "Snow Globe" (Season 1, Episode 29) (2015)
- Minnie's Bow-Toons:
  - "Oh Christmas Tree" (Season 3, Episode 5) (2013)/ "Clarabelle's Christmas Sweater" (Season 1, Episode 16) (2021)
  - "Camp Minnie: Campground Christmas" (Season 8, Episode 10) (2023)
- Muppet Babies: "A Very Muppet Babies Christmas/Summer's Super Fabulous Holiday Surprise" ( Season 1, Episode 17) (2018)
- Out of the Box: "Happy Holidays" (Season 2, Episode 26) (1999)/ "Nutcracker Sweet" (Season 3, Episode 26) (2004)
- PB&J Otter: "The Ice Moose" (Season 2, Episode 18) (1999)
- PJ Masks:
  - "Gekko Saves Christmas/Gekko's Nice Ice Plan" (Season 1, Episode 12) (2015)
  - "PJ Masks Save Christmas" (Season 3, Episode 21) (2019)
- Puppy Dog Pals:
  - "A Very Pug Christmas/The Latke Kerfuffle" (Season 1, Episode 25) (2017)
  - "A Santa for Bob/Snowman Secret Service" (Season 2, Episode 12) (2018)
  - "Elves for a Day/The Dreidel Dilemma" (Season 3, Episode 5) (2019)
  - "A Christmas Mission in Toyland/Nine Lights Tonight" (Season 4, Episode 4) (2020)
  - "Wrap Party Pups/Fixing Santa’s Sleigh" (Season 5, Episode 17) (2022)
- Pupstruction:
  - "Pupstruction Saves Christmas/Pupstruction on Ice" (Season 1, Episode 16) (2023)
  - "A Very Merry Christmas/Mountain Dogs" (Season 2, Episode 10) (2024)
- The Rocketeer (2019 TV series): "The Christmas Star" (Season 1, Episode 20) (2020)
- Rolie Polie Olie:
  - "Jingle, Jangle Day's Eve/Snowie/Starry Starry Night" (Season 2, Episode 11) (1999)
  - "A Jingle Jangle Wish" (Season 5, Episode 4C) (2001)
  - "A Little Jingle Jangle Sparkler/A Gift For Klanky Klaus/All's Squared Away Day" (Season 6, Episode 3) (2003)
- Sofia the First:
  - "Holiday in Enchancia" (Season 1, Episode 24) (2013)
  - "Winter's Gift" (Season 2, Episode 20) (2014)
  - "The Mystic Isles: A Very Mystic Wassalia" (Season 4, Episode 16) (2017)
- Special Agent Oso: "The Living Holiday Lights" (Season 2, Episode 11) (2010)
- Spidey and His Amazing Friends:
  - "A Very Spidey Christmas" (Season 1, Episode 12) (2021)
  - "Merry Spidey Christmas" (Season 2, Episode 8) (2022)
  - "A Snow Day For Aunt May/Hanukkah Heist" (Season 3, Episode 26) (2024)
- Stanley: "Little Dog Lost" (Season 1, Episode 19) (2001)
- Star Wars: Young Jedi Adventures:
  - "Life Day" (Season 1, Episode 19A) (2023)
  - "The Missing Life Day Feast" (Season 2, Episode 9A) (2024)
- SuperKitties:
  - "Merry Mousemas" (Season 1, Episode 24) (2023)
  - "Runaway Sleigh/Hanukkah Rescue" (Season 2, Episode 14) (2024)
  - "Kittydale Christmas Tree/Skating Buddies"(Season 3, Episode 9) (2025)
- The Lion Guard: "Timon & Pumbaa's Christmas" (Season 2, Episode 12) (2017)
- T.O.T.S.: "Santa Baby" (Season 1, Episode 18A) (2019)
- Vampirina:
  - "Nanpire and Grandpop The Greats/There's Snow Place Like Home" (Season 1, Episode 25) (2018)
  - "A Gargoyle Carol" (Season 2, Episode 21) (2019)
  - "The Fright Before Christmas/Scared Snowman" (Season 3, Episode 17) (2020)

==== Nickelodeon/Nicktoons/Nick Jr. Channel ====
- Aaahh!!! Real Monsters: "Gone Shopp'n" (Season 1, Episode 6B) (1994)
- Abby Hatcher: "A Very Fuzzly Christmas" (Season 2, Episode 17) (2020)
- Alvin and the Chipmunks: "A Very Merry Chipmunk" (Season 4, Episode 49) (2020)
- The Adventures of Jimmy Neutron: Boy Genius: "Holly Jolly Jimmy" (Season 2, Episode 8) (2003)
- The Adventures of Paddington (2019 TV series):
  - "Paddington and the Lost Letter" (2020)
  - "Paddington Gets Locked Out on Christmas Day" (2021)
  - "Paddington's Special Visitor/Paddington Celebrates Hanukkah" (2023)
- The Angry Beavers: "Gift Hoarse" (Season 1, Episode 3A) (1997)
- As Told By Ginger: "An Even Steven Holiday Special" (Season 1, Episode 16) (2001)
- "Baby Shark's Big Fishmas Special" (2020)
- Back at the Barnyard: "It's an Udderful Life!" (Season 2, Episode 19) (2009)
- The Backyardigans: "The Action Elves Save Christmas Eve!" (Season 4, Episode 10) (2009)
- Big Nate: "The Fruitcake That Saved Christmas" (Season 3, Episode 8) (2026)
- Blaze and the Monster Machines:
  - "Monster Machine Christmas" (Season 2, Episode 6) (2015)
  - "A Blazing Amazing Christmas" (Season 6, Episode 25) (2022)
  - "Get the Letters to Santa" (Season 8, Episode 12) (2024)
- Bossy Bear: "Candle with Care/Happy Froofenfroogle!/The Winter Gift Swap" (2023)
- Breadwinners: "A Crustmas Story" (Season 2, Episode 9) (2015)
- The Busy World of Richard Scarry: "Abe and Babe's Christmas Lesson/Sally Cat's Christmas Dream/The Best Christmas Present Ever" (Season 4, Episode 10)
- Butterbean's Cafe: "The Sugar Plum Fairy!" (Season 1, Episode 12) (2018)
- CatDog: "A Very CatDog Christmas" (Season 2, Episode 17) (1999)
- ChalkZone: "When Santas Collide" (Season 3, Episode 15) (2004)
- Danny Phantom: "The Fright Before Christmas!" (Season 2, Episode 10) (2005)
- Doug: "Doug's Christmas Story" (Season 4, Episode 10) (1993)
- Face's Music Party:
  - "Face's SuperSnowtacular Holiday Special" (2022)
  - "Face's Holiday Countdown Party" (2023)
- Fanboy & Chum Chum:
  - "Night Morning" (Season 1, Episode 11) (2009)
  - "A Very Brrr-y Icemas" (Season 2, Episode 16) (2011)
- The Fresh Beat Band: "Fresh Beats in Toyland" (Season 2, Episode 7) (2010)
- Fresh Beat Band of Spies: "Christmas 2.0" (Season 1, Episode 18) (2015)
- Go, Diego, Go!: "Diego Saves Christmas!" (Season 2, Episode 7) (2006)
- Harvey Beaks: "It's Christmas You Dorks!" (Season 2, Episode 11) (2016)
- Hey Arnold: "Arnold's Christmas" (Season 1, Episode 11) (1996)
- Invader Zim: "The Most Horrible X-Mas Ever" (Season 2, Episode 1) (2002)
- It's Pony: "Christmas with The Bramleys" (Season 1, Episode 16) (2020)
- Kappa Mikey: "A Christmas Mikey" (Season 1, Episode 19) (2006)
- Kung Fu Panda: Legends of Awesomeness: "Present Tense" (Season 2, Episode 10) (2012)
- Lego City Adventures:
  - "Police Navidad" (Season 1, Episode 17) (2019)
  - " Arrest Ye Merry Gentlemen" (Season 2, Episode 10A) (2020)
- Little Bear:
  - "The Snowball Fight/Winter Solstice/Snowbound" (Season 2, Episode 5) (1996)
  - "Gingerbread Cookies (Season 3, Episode 6A) (1997)
  - "Winter Wonderland" (Season 3, Episode 13B) (1998)
- Little Bill: "Merry Christmas Little Bill" (Season 2, Episode 22) (2001)
- Little Charmers: "Santa Sparkle" (Season 1, Episode 30) (2015)
- Maisy: "Snow/Cards/Christmas Tree/Christmas" (Season 1, Episode 17) (1999)
- My Life as a Teenage Robot: "A Robot for All Seasons" (Season 2, Episode 1) (2004)
- Nella the Princess Knight: "The Knight Before Christmas" (Season 1, Episode 23) (2017)
- NFL Rush Zone:
  - "Frost and Ten" (Season 2, Episode 5) (2012)
  - "Gone Viral" (Season 3, Episode 5) (2013)
- The Penguins of Madagascar: "The All Nighter Before Christmas" (Season 2, Episode 31) (2010)
- Pig Goat Banana Cricket: "Happy Chalawunga" (Season 1, Episode 15) (2015)
- Rainbow Butterfly Unicorn Kitty: "Merry Mythmas" (Season 1, Episode 26) (2019)
- Robot and Monster: "Baconmas" (Season 1, Episode 22) (2012)
- Rocket Power: "A Rocket Xmas" (Season 4, Episode 2) (2003)
- Rock Paper Scissors:
  - "The Holiday Picture" (Season 1, Episode 11A) (2024)
  - "The Origami Robot" (Season 2, Episode 5A) (2025)
- Rocko's Modern Life: "Rocko's Modern Christmas" (Season 2, Episode 6) (1994)
- Sanjay and Craig: "Huggle Day" (Season 3, Episode 5) (2015)
- Santiago of the Seas: A Pirate Christmas (2020)
- Shimmer and Shine: "Santa's Little Genies" (Season 1, Episode 6) (2015)
- The Smurfs: A Smurfy Christmas (2023)
- Sunny Day: "Best Christmas Ever!" (Season 1, Episode 16) (2017)
- Team Umizoomi: "Santa's Little Fixers" (Season 2, Episode 4) (2010)
- The Tiny Chef Show: "Tiny Chef's Marvelous Mish Mash Special" (2023)
- The Wild Thornberrys: "Have Yourself a Thornberry Little Christmas" (Season 2, Episode 21) (1999)
- T.U.F.F. Puppy: A Doomed Christmas (Season 1, Episode 20) (2011)
- Wayside:
  - "Christmas" (Season 2, Episode 6B) (2007)
- Wallykazam!:
  - "Wally Saves the Trollidays" (Season 1, Episode 21) (2014)
- Wild Grinders:
  - "Grinder Claus/Merry Grindernukamas" (Season 1, Episode 24) (2012)
  - "Grindy the Snowman" (Season 2, Episode 23) (2014)
- Winx Club: "A Magix Christmas" (Season 5, Episode 10) (2012)

===== Blue's Clues =====
- "Blue's Big Holiday" (Season 3, Episode 22) (1999)
- "Blue's First Holiday" (Season 5, Episode 29) (2003)

===== Blue's Clues & You! =====
- "Blue's Night Before Christmas" (Season 2, Episode 8) (2020)
- "A Blue's Clues Festival of Lights" (Season 3, Episode 4) (2021)
- "Blue's Snowy Day Surprise" (Season 3, Episode 5) (2021)
- "A Blue Christmas with You!" (Season 4, Episode 6) (2022)

===== Bubble Guppies =====
- "Happy Holidays, Mr. Grumpfish!" (Season 2, Episode 2) (2011)
- "A Very Guppy Christmas" (Season 3, Episode 20) (2014)
- "The Guppies Save Christmas!" (Season 5, Episode 14) (2020)
- "Christmas is Coming!" (Season 6, Episode 3) (2021)

===== Dora the Explorer =====
- "A Present For Santa" (Season 2, Episode 15) (2002)
- "Dora's Christmas Carol Adventure" (Season 5, Episode 14) (2009)

===== The Fairly OddParents =====
- "Christmas Every Day" (Season 1, Episode 7) (2001)
- "Snow Bound" (Season 3, Episode 19B) (2003)
- "Merry Wishmas" (Season 6, Episode 12) (2008)

===== Franklin =====
- "Franklin's School Play" (Season 1, Episode 9A) (1997)
- "Franklin's Christmas Gift" (Season 1, Episode 12A) (1998)
- Franklin's Magic Christmas (2001)
- Franklin and Friends:
  - "Franklin's Christmas Spirit" (Season 1, Episode 25) (2014)

===== Max & Ruby =====
- "Max's Christmas/Ruby’s Snow Queen/Max’s Rocket Run" (Season 1, Episode 10) (2002)
- "Grandma's Present/Max and Ruby's Christmas Tree/Max's Snowplow" (Season 3, Episode 13) (2007)
- "Ruby's Gingerbread House/Max's Christmas Passed/Max's New Year" (Season 4, Episode 8) (2009)
- "Ruby's Perfect Christmas Tree/Max's Christmas Present/Max and Ruby's Christmas Carol" (Season 5, Episode 1) (2011)
- "Max Decorates" (Season 6, Episode 16A) (2017)
- "Let it Snow" (Season 7, Episode 10B) (2018)

===== PAW Patrol =====
- "Pups Save Christmas" (Season 1, Episode 11) (2013)
- "Pups Save a Bah Humdinger" (Season 7, Episode 16) (2020)
- "Charger's Christmas Adventure/Pups Save Great Uncle Smiley's Cup" (Season 10, Episode 14) (2023)
- "A Jr. Patrollers' Christmas" (Season 11, Episode 14) (2024)
- Shorts
  - "Dino Rescue: Pups Save a Dino Christmas" (Season 1, Episode 9) (2020)
- Rubble & Crew
  - "The Crew Builds a Christmas Show/The Crew Builds a Sled Ramp" (Season 1, Episode 24) (2023)
  - "The Crew Makes Christmas Magical" (Season 2, Episode 19) (2024)

===== The Ren & Stimpy Show =====
- "Son of Stimpy" (Season 2, Episode 7) (1993)
- "A Scooter for Yaksmas" (Season 5, Episode 9) (1995)

===== Rugrats =====
- "The Santa Experience" (Season 2, Episode 14) (1992)
- "The Blizzard" (Season 3, Episode 12B) (1993)
- "A Rugrats Chanukah" (Season 4, Episode 1) (1996)
- "Let it Snow" (Season 4, Episode 14B) (1997)
- "A Rugrats Kwanzaa" (Season 7, Episode 13) (2001)
- "Babies in Toyland" (Season 9, Episode 3-4) (2002)
- All Grown Up!:
  - "The Finster Who Stole Christmas" (Season 4, Episode 1) (2004)
- Rugrats (2021 TV series):
  - "Traditions" (Season 1, Episode 14) (2021)

===== SpongeBob SquarePants =====
- "Christmas Who?" (Season 2, Episode 8) (2000)
- "Survival of the Idiots" (Season 2, Episode 9A) (2001)
- "The Secret Box" (Season 2, Episode 15A) (2001)
- "Snowball Effect" (Season 3, Episode 6A) (2002)
- "Frozen Face-Off" (Season 8, Episode 4) (2011)
- "It's a SpongeBob Christmas!" (Season 8, Episode 23) (2012)
- "Goons on the Moon" (Season 11, Episode 26) (2018)
- "Plankton's Old Chum" (Season 12, Episode 11A) (2019)
- "SpongeBob's Road to Christmas" (Season 13, Episode 5) (2021)
- "Sandy's Country Christmas" (Season 14, Episode 13) (2024)
- Kamp Koral: SpongeBob's Under Years:
  - "The Ho! Ho! Horror!" (Season 1, Episode 12A) (2021)
- The Patrick Star Show:
  - "Just in Time for Christmas" (Season 1, Episode 10A) (2021)
  - "Squidina's Holidaze Special" (Season 3, Episode 15) (2024)

===== The Loud House / The Casagrandes =====
- "Snow Bored" (Season 1, Episode 24B) (2016)
- "11 Louds a Leapin'" (Season 2, Episode 1) (2016)
- "Snow Way Out/Snow Way Down (Season 2, Episode 26) (2017)
- "Season's Cheating/A Flipmas Carol" (Season 5, Episode 8A) (2020)
- "Snow Escape/Snow News Day" (Season 6, Episode 23) (2022)
- "Twas the Fight Before Christmas" (Season 7, Episode 19) (2023)
- The Casagrandes:
  - "A Very Casagrandes Christmas" (Season 2, Episode 2) (2020)

===== Wow! Wow! Wubbzy! =====
- "O' Figgity Fig Tree/Snow Day" (Season 1, Episode 22) (2007)
- "Great and Grumpy Holiday/The Super Special Gift" (Season 2, Episode 10) (2008)

===== Weekday and Saturday morning cartoons =====
- The Adventures of Teddy Ruxpin: "Winter Adventures" (Season 2, Episode 55) (1987)
- Biker Mice from Mars: "Chill Zone" (Season 1, Episode 12) (1994)
- BraveStarr: "Tex's Terrible Night" (Season 1, Episode 46) (1987)
- Count Duckula: "A Christmas Quacker" (Season 3, Episode 10) (1990)
- Dinosaucers: "There's No Such Thing as Stego-Claws" (Season 1, Episode 47) (1987)
- Extreme Dinosaurs: "Holiday on Ice" (Season 1, Episode 52) (1997)
- Gadget Boy & Heather: "A Gadget Boy Christmas Around the World" (Season 2, Episode 25) (1998)
- Gadget & the Gadgetinis: "Santa Claw" (Season 1, Episode 35) (2003)
- G.I. Joe: A Real American Hero: "COBRA Claws Are Coming to Town" (Season 3, Episode 39) (1985)
- Heathcliff:
  - "Christmas Memories" (Season 2, Episode 9b) (1985)
  - "North Pole Cat" (Season 2, Episode 21a) (1985)
- Hello Kitty's Furry Tale Theater: "The Year Scroogenip Swiped Christmas" (Season 1, Episode 12) (1987)
- It's Punky Brewster: "Christmas In July" (Season 1, Episode 5b) (1985)
- Kate & Mim-Mim:
  - "A Christmas Wish" (Season 1, Episode 26) (2014)
- Littlest Pet Shop:
  - "Do Not Solve Until Christmas" (Season 1, Episode 15a) (1995)
  - "Who Scrooged McRude?" (Season 1, Episode 39a) (1995)
- Tatu:
  - Imperfect Girl (2000)
- Paddington Bear: "The Ghost of Christmas Paddington" (Season 1, Episode 7) (1989)
- The Pink Panther: "I'm Dreaming of a Pink Christmas" (Season 1, Episode 35b) (1993)
- Pucca:
  - "'Tis the Season for REVENGE!/Northern Lights Out/Secret Santa" (Season 1, Episode 10) (2006)
- RoboCop: Alpha Commando:
  - "Oh Tannenbaum, Whoa Tannenbaum!" (Season 1, Episode 18) (1998)
- Robotech:
  - "Season's Greetings" (Season 1, Episode 35) (1985)
- Saber Rider and the Star Sheriffs: "The Monarch Supreme" (Season 1, Episode 24) (1987)
- Samurai Pizza Cats: "The Cheese who Stole Christmas" (Season 1, Episode 47) (1993)
- Thugaboo: Christmas Special (2006)

==== ABC ====
- Bump in the Night: "'Twas the Night Before Bumpy" (1995)
- Dumb and Dumber: "Santa Klutz" (Season 1, Episode 8a) (1995)
- Pac-Man: "Christmas Comes to Pac-Land" (1982)
- Popeye the Sailor: "Spinach Greetings" (Season 2) (1960)
- The Real Ghostbusters: "X-Mas Marks the Spot" (Season 1, Episode 13) (1986)
- Sabrina: The Animated Series: "Witchmas Carole" (Season 1, Episode 58) (1999)

==== CBS ====
- Ace Ventura: Pet Detective: "The Reindeer Hunter" (Season 1, Episode 1) (1995)
- The Adventures of Raggedy Ann and Andy: "The Christmas Adventure" (Season 1, Episode 9) (1988)
- Famous Classic Tales: "A Christmas Carol" (Season 1, Episode 3) (1970)
- The Fat Albert "Christmas Special" (1977)
- A Garfield Christmas Special (1987)
- Garfield and Friends: "Heatwave Holiday" (Season 2, Episode 4C) (1989)
- The Little Rascals: The Little Rascals Christmas Special (1979)
- The Mask: "Santa Mask" (Season 1, Episode 14) (1995)
- Tennessee Tuxedo and His Tales: "Tree Trimmers" (Season 3, Episode 9) (1965)
- The Tom and Jerry Comedy Show: "Snowbrawl" (Season 1, Episode 22) (1980)

==== Fox Kids ====
- The Adventures of Sam & Max: Freelance Police: "Christmas, Bloody Christmas" (Season 1, Episode 7a) (1997)
- Bobby's World: "Miracle on 34th Street & Rural Route 1" (Season 6, Episode 5) (1995)
- Eek! The Cat:
  - It's a Wonderful Nine Lives (Season 1, Episode 12) (1992)
  - It's a Very Merry Eek's-Mas (Season 2, Episode 9) (1993)
- Life with Louie:
  - "A Christmas Surprise for Mrs. Stillman" (Season 1, Episode 1) (1994)
  - Family Portrait" (Season 3, Episode 10) (1997)
- The New Woody Woodpecker Show:
  - "A Very Woody Christmas/It's A Chilly Christmas After All/Yule Get Yours" (Season 1, Episode 23) (1999)
  - "The Twelve Lies of Christmas" (Season 2, Episode 17) (2000)
- Peter Pan and the Pirates: "Hook's Christmas" (Season 1, Episode 37) (1991)
- The Spooktacular New Adventures of Casper: "A Christmas Peril/Ms. Banshee's Holiday Hits/Good Morning, Dr. Harvey/Fright Before Christmas (Season 2, Episode 13) (1996)
- Super Dave: Daredevil for Hire: Merry Christmas, Super Dave!" (Season 1, Episode 12) (1992)
- Teenage Mutant Ninja Turtles: "The Christmas Aliens" (a. k. a. "Michelangelo's Christmas Rescue) (Season 3, Episode 12) (2004)
- The Tick: "The Tick Loves Santa!" (Season 2, Episode 10) (1995)
- Where on Earth Is Carmen Sandiego?: "Just Like Old Times" (Season 3, Episode 10) (1995)
- X-Men: "Have Yourself a Morlock Little X-Mas" (Season 4, Episode 17) (1995)

==== NBC ====
- Alvin and the Chipmunks:
  - A Chipmunk Christmas (1981)
  - "Swiss Family Chipmunks/Santa Harry" (Season 1, Episode 11) (1983)
  - Merry Christmas, Mr. Carroll" ( Season 7, Episode 13) (1989)
- The Berenstain Bears' Christmas Tree (1979)
- The Bullwinkle Show: "Topsy Turvy World" (Season 3, Episode 27-33) (1962)
- Camp Candy: "Christmas in July" (Season 1, Episode 13) (1990)
- Inspector Gadget: Inspector Gadget Saves Christmas (1992)
- Pink Panther and Sons: "Insanity Claus" (Season 1, Episode 8b) (1984)
- The Space Kidettes: "The Flight Before Christmas" (Season 1, Episode 11) (1966)

==== PBS Kids ====
- Alma's Way:
  - "Alma on Ice" (Season 1, Episode 8B) (2021)
  - Alma's Nochebuena" (Season 1, Episode 14A) (2021)
- Arthur: Arthur's Perfect Christmas (2000)
- Angelina Ballerina:
  - "The Gift" (Season 1, Episode 2A) (2002)
  - Christmas in Mouseland (2002)
- Angelina Ballerina: The Next Steps: "Angelina's Holiday Treats" (Season 2, Episode 2A) (2009)
- Barney and the Backyard Gang: Waiting for Santa (1990)
- Barney & Friends:
  - Barney's Night Before Christmas (1999)
  - "Barney's Christmas Star" (2002)
  - "Gift of the Dinos/A Visit to Santa" (Season 11, Episode 19) (2007)
  - "A Very Merry Christmas" (2011)
- Boohbah:
  - "Glowing Lanterns" (2005)
- Caillou
  - Caillou's Holiday Movie (2003)
  - "Caillou's Christmas" (Season 4, Episode 17) (2007)
- The Cat in the Hat Knows a Lot About Christmas! (2012)
- Clifford's Puppy Days
  - "The Big, Big Present/Hanukah Plunder Blunder" (Season 2, Episode 7) (2005)
  - Heroes and Friends/The Cookie Crumbles (Season 2 Episode 12) (2006)
- Curious George: A Very Monkey Christmas (2009)
- Cyberchase:
  - "Starlight Night" (Season 3, episode 12) (2004)
  - "When Penguins Fly" (Season 6, episode 2) (2007)
  - "A Reboot Eve to Remember" (Season 11, episode 5) (2017)
- Daniel Tiger's Neighborhood:
  - "Snowflake Day!" (Season 1, Episode 33) (2013)
  - "Daniel's Winter Adventure/Neighborhood Nutcracker" (Season 2, Episode 7) (2014)
- Dinosaur Train:
  - "Dinosaurs in the Snow/Cretaceous Conifers" (Season 1, Episode 17) (2009)
  - "Don's Winter Wish/Festival of Lights" (Season 2, Episode 12) (2012)
- Elinor Wonders Why:
  - "The Science of Staying Warm" (Season 1, Episode 4A) (2020)
  - "Snow Friend" (Season 1, Episode 11B) (2020)
- Jay Jay the Jet Plane: "Jay Jay's Christmas Adventure" (Season 1, Episode 35-36) (1998)
- Let's Go Luna!: "Luna's Christmas Around The World!" (2018)
- Liberty's Kids: "Across the Delaware" (Season 1, Episode 19) (2002)
- Martha Speaks: "Martha's Holiday Surprise" (Season 6, Episode 8) (2014)
- Maya & Miguel: "Miguel's Wonderful Life" (Season 4, Episode 3) (2005)
- Molly of Denali: "Tooey's Hole-liday Sweater" (Season 1, Episode 32B) (2020)
- Nature Cat: "A Nature Carol" (2019)
- Odd Squad: Reindeer Games" (Season 1, Episode 5) (2014)
- Peg + Cat:
  - "The Hanukkah Problem" (Season 1, Episode 28B)
  - "The Christmas Problem" (Season 1, Episode 29) (2014)
- Pinkalicious & Peterrific: "Gingerbread House/Christmas Tree Trouble" (Season 2, Episode 13) (2020)
- Ready Jet Go!: "Holidays in Boxwood Terrace" (Season 1, Episode 38) (2017)
- Rosie's Rules: "Rosie's Christmas in Mexico" (Season 1, Episode 36) (2023)
- Sid the Science Kid: "Sid's Holiday Adventure" (Season 1, Episode 38) (2009)
- Sesame Street:
  - Christmas Eve on Sesame Street (1978)
  - Elmo Saves Christmas (1996)
  - Elmo's World: Happy Holidays! (2002)
  - Elmo's Christmas Countdown (2007)
  - Once Upon a Sesame Street Christmas (2016)
  - "Holiday at Hooper's" (Season 51, Episode 6) (2020)
- Splash and Bubbles: "Whitebeard/Coral Day" (Season 1, Episode 31) (2017)
- Super Why!:
  - "Twas the Night Before Christmas" (Season 1, Episode 38) (2008)
  - "The Nutcracker" (Season 1, Episode 56) (2009)
  - Judith's Happy Chanukah" (Season 3, Episode 10) (2015)
- Teletubbies:
  - "Christmas Tree" (Season 1, Episode 111) (1997)
  - "Making Christmas Cards" (Season 1, Episode 112) (1997)
  - "Crackers" (Season 1, Episode 113) (1997)
  - "Christmas Carols" (Season 1, Episode 114) (1997)
  - "Snowy Story" (Season 1, Episode 115) (1997)
  - "Christmas in South Africa" (Season 2, Episode 118) (1998)
  - "Christmas in Finland" (Season 2, Episode 119) (1998)
  - "Christmas in UK" (Season 2, Episode 120) (1998)
  - "Christmas in Spain" (Season 2, Episode 121) (1998)
  - "Nativity Play" (Season 2, Episode 122) (1998)
  - "The Christmas Special" (2018)
  - "Getting Ready for Christmas" (2022)
  - "Santa Po" (2022)
  - "Christmas Crackers" (2022)
  - "It's Christmas with Santa Po" (2022)
  - "Christmas Sing Along" (2022)
- The Magic School Bus: "Holiday Special" (Season 3, Episode 13) (1996)
- Wild Kratts: "A Creature Christmas" (Season 4, Episode 5) (2015)
- WordGirl: "Oh Holiday Cheese" (Season 2, Episode 19) (2009)
- WordWorld: "The Christmas Star/A Christmas Present For Dog" (Season 1, Episode 26) (2008)
- Work It Out Wombats!: "The Treeborhood Parranda/Happy New Acorn Year" (Season 1, Episode 24) (2023)

=== Showtime ===
- A Bunch of Munsch: "Thomas' Snowsuit/50 Below Zero" (Episode 1) (1991)

=== Universal Animation Studios ===
- Woody Woodpecker:
  - "Christmess Eve" (Season 1, Episode 6) (2018)

==== Universal Kids/Sprout ====
- "A Sesame Street Christmas Carol" (2006)
- Dot.:
  - "A Song for Everyone" (Season 1, Episode 13) (2016)
  - "The Holiday Tree" (Season 1, Episode 14) (2016)
- Justin Time:
  - "Yodel Odel Day" (Season 1, Episode 2A) (2011)
  - "Babushka's Bear" (Season 3, Episode 8) (2016)
- Nina's World:
  - "Nina's Very Merry Gift" (Season 1, Episode 31) (2016)
  - "Terrific Trucks Save Christmas" (2016)
- Where's Waldo:
  - "A Wanderer's Christmas" (Season 1, Episode 20) (2019)

==== Hanna-Barbera / Warner Bros. Animation / Kids' WB ====
- Batman: The Animated Series: Christmas With The Joker (1992)
- Batman: The Brave and the Bold: "Invasion of the Secret Santas!" (Season 1, Episode 4) (2008)
- Dorothy and the Wizard of Oz: "Dorothy's Christmas in Oz" (2018)
- Earthworm Jim: "For Whom The Jingle Bells Tolls" (Season 2, Episode 10) (1996)
- Freakazoid: "The Chip (Part 1)" (Season 1, Episode 6)/"The Chip (Part 2)" (Season 1, Episode 7A)/"In Arms Way" (Season 1, Episode 10A) (1995)
- Histeria: "The American Revolution (Part 1)" (Season 1, Episode 5) (1998)
- Jackie Chan Adventures: "A Jolly J-Team Xmas" (Season 3 Episode 10) (2002)
- Jellystone!: "Jailcation" (Season 1, Episode 36) (2022)
- The Jetsons: "A Jetson Christmas Carol" (Season 2, Episode 36) (1985)
- Justice League: "Comfort And Joy" (Season 2, Episode 23) (2003)
- Krypto the Superdog: "Storybook Holiday" (Season 1, Episode 26) (2005)
- MAD:
  - "Da Grinchy Code/Duck" (Season 1, Episode 12) (2010)
  - "FROST/Undercover Claus (Season 2, Episode 15) (2011)
  - "Fantastic Four Christmases/Red & White Collar" (Season 3, Episode 20) (2012)
- Men in Black: The Series: "The Black Christmas Syndrome" (Season 2, Episode 10) (1998)
- Mucha Lucha: "The Match Before Xmas" (Season 3, Episode 9) (2004)
- Static Shock: "Frozen Out" (Season 2, Episode 5) (2002)
- The New Batman Adventures: "Holiday Knights" (Season 1, Episode 1) (1997)
- ThunderCats Roar: "Mandora Saves Christmas" (Season 1, Episode 52) (2020)
- The Spectacular Spider-Man: "Reinforcement" (Season 2, Episode 3) (2009)
- Tom and Jerry:
  - "The Night Before Christmas" (1941)
  - "Mice Follies" (1954)
  - "The A-Tom-inable Snowman" (1966)
- The Tom and Jerry Show:
  - "The Plight Before Christmas" (Season 1, Episode 28) (2014)
  - "Dragon Down the Holidays" (Season 2, Episode 15) (2017)
- Tom and Jerry Tales: "Ho Ho Horrors" (Season 1, Episode 22) (2007)
- Top Cat: "The Long, Hot Winter" (Season 1, Episode 15) (1962)
- Unikitty!:
  - "No Day Like Snow Day" (Season 1, Episode 3) (2017)
  - "Top of the Naughty List" (Season 1, Episode 39) (2018)
- Wacky Races:
  - "It's a Wacky Life" (Season 1, Episode 18) (2017)
  - "Dashing Thru the Snow" (Season 1, Episode 20) (2017)
  - Signed, Sealed, and Wacky" (Season 2, Episode 24) (2018)
- X-Men: Evolution: "On Angel's Wings" (Season Two, Episode 7) * (2001)

===== Animaniacs =====
- Animaniacs
  - "Twas the Day Before Christmas/Jingle Boo/The Great Wakkorotti: The Holiday Concert/A Christmas Plotz/Little Drummer Warners" (Season 1, Episodes 49 & 50) (1993)
  - "The Twelve Days of Christmas" (Season 3, Episode 10D) (1996)
  - "Noel" (Season 4, Episode 2C) (1996)
  - "The Christmas Tree" (Season 5, Episode 8A) (1997)
- Pinky and the Brain: "A Pinky and the Brain Christmas" (Season 1, Episode 8) (1995)
- Pinky, Elmyra and the Brain: "Yule Be Sorry" (Season 1, Episode 7A) (1998)
- Animaniacs (2020): "How the Brain Thieved Christmas, Part 1 & 2/Santamaniacs" (Season 3, Episode 9) (2023)

===== The Flintstones =====
- "Christmas Flintstone" (Season 5, Episode 15) (1964/ABC)
- A Flintstone Christmas (1977/NBC)
- A Flintstone Family Christmas (1993/ABC)
- A Flintstones Christmas Carol (1994/ABC)

==== Looney Tunes ====
- Looney Tunes:
  - "Gift Wrapped" (1952)
  - "Bugs Bunny's Looney Christmas Tales" (1979/CBS)
- Tiny Toon Adventures: "It's A Wonderful Tiny Toons Christmas Special" (Season 3, Episode 20) (1992/Fox Kids)
- Taz-Mania: "No Time For Christmas" (Season 3, Episode 13) (1993/Fox Kids)
- The Sylvester & Tweety Mysteries:
  - "It Happened One Night Before Christmas" (Season 1, Episode 10) (1995/Kids' WB)
  - "Feather Christmas/A Fist Full of Lutefisk" (Season 4, Episode 41) (1998/Kids' WB)
- Baby Looney Tunes: "Christmas In July" (Season 1, Episode 12b) (2002)
- The Looney Tunes Show: "A Christmas Carol" (Season 2, Episode 10) (2012/Cartoon Network)
- New Looney Tunes:
  - "Ice Ice Bunny" (Season 1, Episode 8B) (2015)
  - "Tis the Seasoning/Winter Blunderland" (Season 1, Episode 44) (2017)
  - "The Pepe Who Came in From the Cold" (Season 3, Episode 27a) (2020)
  - "The Legend of Burrito Monday" (Season 3, Episode 52) (2020)
- Looney Tunes Cartoons:
  - "Bugs Bunny's 24-Carrot Holiday Special" (Season 1, Episode 11) (2020)
  - "Winter Hungerland" (Season 6, Episode 4c) (2023)
- Bugs Bunny Builders: "Looneyburg Lights" (Season 1, Episode 19/20) (2022)

===== Scooby-Doo =====
- Scooby-Doo, Where Are You!: "That's Snow Ghost" (Season 1, Episode 17) (1970)
- The New Scooby-Doo Mysteries: "The Nutcracker Scoob" (Season 1, Episode 13) (1984)
- What's New, Scooby-Doo?: A Scooby-Doo Christmas" (Season 1, Episode 10) (2002)
- Scooby-Doo! Haunted Holidays (2012)
- Be Cool, Scooby-Doo!
  - "Scary Christmas" (Season 1, Episode 14) (2015)
  - "Scroogey Doo" (Season 2, Episode 10) (2017)

===== The Smurfs =====
- "The Baby's First Christmas" (Season 3, Episode 42) (1983)
- The Magic Sack of Mr. Nicholas" (Season 7, Episode 25A) (1987)
- "'Tis The Season To Be Smurfy" (1987)

==== Other Animations ====
===== Angry Birds =====
Angry birds classic & series

- Angry Birds Toons
  - "Jingle Yells" (Season 1, Episode 40) (2013)
  - "Joy to the Pigs" (Season 2, Episode 10) (2014)
  - "Last Tree Standing" (Season 3, Episode 11) (2015)
- Piggy Tales
  - "Snowed Up" (Season 1, Episode 28) (2014)
  - "Light Dance" (Season 3, Episode 24) (2016)
  - "Pig Expectations" (Season 3, Episode 25) (2016)
  - "Gift Wrapped" (Season 3, Episode 26) (2016)
  - "Holiday Song" (Season 3, Episode 27) (2016)
  - "Holiday Heist" (Season 4, Episode 2) (2017)
  - "Joyful Jingle" (Season 4, Episode 16) (2017)
  - Happy New Pig (Season 4, Episode 24) (2017)
- Angry Birds: Summer Madness
  - Pigmas" (Season 3, Episode 4) (2022)

===== GoGoRiki =====
  - "Snow Daze" (Season 1, Episode 12A) (2008)
  - "Operation Santa Claus" (Season 1, Episode 12B) (2008)
  - "Happy New Year" (Season 1, Episode 12C) (2008)

===== Anime =====
- Astro Boy: "The Light Ray Robot" (Season 1, Episode 13)
- Bobobo-bo Bo-bobo: "Let's Get Wiggy With It" (Season 1, Episode 2) (2005)
- Cyborg 009: "Christmas Eve Mirage" (Season 1, Episode 11)
- Digimon: Digital Monsters "A Very Digi Christmas (Season 2, Episode 38) (2001)
- Dinosaur King: "Santa Saurus!" (Season 1, Episode 45) (2007)
- Flint the Time Detective: "Cavemen's Christmas" (Season 1, Episode 13)
- Hamtaro:
  - "Merry Christmas!" (Season 1, Episode 25) (2000)
  - "It's Santa, Merry Christmas" (Season 9 Episode 26) (2004)
  - "A Christmas Ride!" (Season 11, Episode 26) (2005)
- Love Hina: "Love Hina Christmas Special - Silent Eve" (2000)
- Ranma ½: "Tendo Family Christmas Scramble"(1993)
- Sgt. Frog: The Space Frog Who Stole Christmas!"(Season 1, Episode 39)
- Yo-Kai Watch:
  - "A Very Christmas/The Koma-Santa Clause/Yo-Kai Ol' Saint Trick" (Season 2, Episode 24) (2016)
  - "Christmas Blackout!; Time for a Yo-kai Watch Upgrade" (Season 3, Episode 18) (2018)

===== Nintendo =====
- Donkey Kong Country: The Kongo Bongo Festival of Lights (1999)
- The Super Mario Bros. Super Show!: Koopa Klaus (1989)
- The Super Mario Bros. Super Show!: Santa Claus is Coming to Flatbush (1989)
- Super Mario World: The Night Before Cave Christmas (1991)

====== Pokémon ======
- "Holiday Hi-Jynx" (Season 2, Episode 65) (1998)
- "Pikachu's Winter Vacations: Christmas Night" (1999)
- "Pikachu's Winter Vacations: Stantler's Little Helpers" (2000)
- "Pikachu's Winter Vacations: Delibird's Dilemma" (2001)
- "Pikachu's Winter Vacations: Snorlax Snowman" (2001)

===== Adventures of Sonic the Hedgehog =====
- Sonic Christmas Blast (1996)

==== Disney Sing-Along Songs ====
- Very Merry Christmas Songs (1988/2002)
- The 12 Days of Christmas (1993)

=== Pippi Longstocking ===
- "Pippi's Christmas" (Season 1, Episode 14) (1998)

=== VeggieTales ===
- "The Toy That Saved Christmas" (1996)
- "The Star of Christmas" (2002)
- "Saint Nicholas: A Story of Joyful Giving" (2009)
- "It's a Meaningful Life" (2010)
- "The Little Drummer Boy (2011)
- Merry Larry and the True Light of Christmas" (2013)

=== VeggieTales in the City ===
- "An Ichabeezer Christmas/A Christmas Play" (Season 2, Episode 6) (2017)

=== The VeggieTales Show ===
- "The Best Christmas Gift" (Season 1, Episode 1) (2019)

=== Netflix ===
- Action Pack:
  - "The Action Pack Saves Christmas" (2022)
- Angry Birds: Summer Madness:
  - "Pigmas" (Season 3, Episode 4) (2022)
- A StoryBots Christmas (2017)
- The Bad Guys: A Very Bad Holiday (2023)
- Beat Bugs:
  - "Christmas Time Is Here Again" (Season 2, Episode 5) (2016)
- The Boss Baby: Christmas Bonus (2022)
- Chico Bon Bon: Monkey with a Tool Belt:
  - "Chico Bon Bon and the Very Berry Holiday" (2020)
- The Creature Cases:
  - "The Missing Mammoth: A Holiday Mystery" (2022)
- Cupcake & Dino: General Services:
  - "Christmas is Cancelled/Ice Station Dino" (Season 1, Episode 13) (2018)
- The Cuphead Show!:
  - "Holiday Tree-dition" (Season 3, Episode 5) (2022)
  - "A Very Devil Christmas" (Season 3, Episode 6) (2022)
- Dead End: Paranormal Park:
  - "The Nightmare Before Christmas in July (Season 1, Episode 5)" (2022)
- DreamWorks Dragons: Rescue Riders:
  - "Huttsgalor Holiday" (2020)
- The Epic Tales of Captain Underpants:
  - "Mega Blissmas" (2020)
- Gabby's Dollhouse:
  - "A CAT-Tabulous Christmas" (Season 6, Episode 1) (2022)
  - "Mermaid Christmas Cruise" (Season 8, Episode 7) (2023)
- Go, Dog. Go!:
  - "Snow Dog, Snow" (Season 2, Episode 1) (2021)
- Go! Go! Cory Carson:
  - "A Go! Go! Cory Carson Christmas" (2020)
- Harvey Girls Forever!:
  - "Miracle on Harvey Street/I Know What You Did Last Stu-mmer" (Season 4, Episode 2) (2020)
- Hilda:
  - "Chapter 10: The Yule Lads" (Season 2, Episode 10) (2020)
- Home
  - "Home for the Holidays" (2017)
- Inspector Gadget (2015):
  - "The Claw Who Stole Christmas/The Thingy" (Season 2, Episode 15) (2018)
- Johnny Test:
  - "Johnny's Holiday Light Fight" (Season 1, Episode 20) (2021)
- Llama Llama:
  - "Snow Show/Secret Santa" (Season 1, Episode 6) (2018)
- Mighty Express:
  - "A Mighty Christmas" (2020)
- Miraculous Ladybug:
  - "A Special Christmas/Santa Claws (Season 2, Episode 1) (2016)
  - Christmaster" (Season 3, Episode 24) (2019)
- The Mr. Peabody & Sherman Show:
  - "Charles Dickens" (Season 2, Episode 10B) (2016)
  - "Robert Edwin Peary" (Season 3, Episode 10B) (2016)
- My Little Pony: Make Your Mark:
  - "Winter Wishday" (Season 1, Episode 10) (2022)
- Octonauts:
  - "Octonauts and the Great Christmas Rescue" (Season 1, Episode 52) (2011)
  - "Octonauts and a Very Vegimal Christmas" (Season 5/ Special) (2013)
- Oggy Oggy:
  - "The Most Wonderful Time of the Year/White Christmas/The Mysterious Gift" (Season 3, Episode 23) (2023)
- Spirit Riding Free:
  - "Lucky and the Christmas Spirit" (Season 2, Episode 5) (2017)
  - "Spirit of Christmas" (2019)
- Super Monsters:
  - "Super Monsters and the Wish Star" (2018)
  - "Super Monsters Save Christmas" (2019)
  - "Santa's Super Monster Helpers" (2020)
- Team Zenko Go:
  - "Harmony Harbor Holiday Surprise" (Season 2, Episode 5) (2022)
- Trash Truck:
  - "A Trash Truck Christmas" (2020)
- Trolls: The Beat Goes On!:
  - "Snow Day" (Season 5, Episode 5A) (2019)
- True and the Rainbow Kingdom:
  - "TRUE: Winter Wishes" (Season 4, Episode 6-7) (2019)
- Wonderoos: Holiday Holiday! (2020)

=== Amazon Prime ===
- Click, Clack, Moo: "Christmas at the Farm" (2017)
- Costume Quest: "Heroes on Holiday" (Season 1, Episode 14) (2019)
- Creative Galaxy: "Baby Georgia's First Christmas/Christmas Memories" (Season 1, Episode 13) (2014)
- If You Give a Mouse a Cookie: "If You Give a Mouse a Christmas Cookie" (2016)
- Pete the Cat: "A Very Groovy Christmas" (Season 1, Episode 3) (2018)
- The Snowy Day
- Wishenpoof: "A Wish World Christmas" (Season 2, Episode 12–13) (2017)

=== Peacock ===
- Madagascar: A Little Wild: Holiday Goose Chase (2021)
- Trolls: TrollsTopia:
  - "Merry Cloudmas" (Season 4, Episode 5B) (2021)

=== Apple TV+ ===
- Doug Unplugs: "Botty Holidays" (Season 2, Episode 7) (2021)
- Eva the Owlet: "Eva's Moon Wish" (Season 1, Episode 9) (2024)
- Frog and Toad: "Christmas Eve" (Season 1, Episode 9) (2023)
- Get Rolling with Otis: "A Winter’s Cow Tale" (Season 1, Episode 9) (2021)
- Interrupting Chicken: "A Chicken Carol" (Season 1, Episode 9) (2022)
- Pinecone & Pony: "Festival of Might" (Season 2, Episode 6A) (2023)
- Pretzel and the Puppies: "Merry Muttgomery!" (Season 1, Episode 9) (2022)
- Shape Island: "The Winter Blues" (Season 1, Episode 10) (2023)
- The Snoopy Show:
  - "Happiness Is a Snow Day" (Season 1, Episode 4) (2021)
  - "Happiness Is the Gift of Giving" (Season 2, Episode 13) (2022)
  - "Happiness is Holiday Traditions" (Season 3, Episode 13) (2023)
- Stillwater: The Way Home" (Season 1, Episode 13) (2021)

=== Sitcoms ===
- Aqua Teen Hunger Force: Season 2, Episode 21: "The Dressing" (December 14, 2003)
- Beavis and Butt-Head: Season 7, Episode Non-Canon "Beavis and Butt-Head Do Thanksgiving" (November 27, 1997)
- Dan Vs.: Season 2, Episode 1: "The Family Thanksgiving" (November 19, 2011)
- Dr. Katz, Professional Therapist: Season 5, Episode 18: "Thanksgiving" (November 23, 1998)
- Father of the Pride: Season 1, Episode 9: "The Thanksgiving Episode" (December 28, 2004)
- Son of Zorn: Season 1, Episode 7: "The Battle of Thanksgiving" (November 13, 2016)
- Solar Opposites "The Hunt for Brown October" (2024)
- Squidbillies: Season 10, Episode 9: "Thank-Taking" (November 20, 2016)

==== American Dad! ====
- Season 6, Episode 6: "There Will Be Bad Blood" (November 28, 2010)
- Season 9, Episode 5: "Kung Pao Turkey" (November 24, 2013)

==== Bless the Harts ====
- Season 1, Episode 8: "Mega-Lo-Memories" (November 24, 2019)
- Season 2, Episode 7: "Mega Lo Memories: Part Deux" (November 22, 2020)

==== Bob's Burgers ====
- Season 3, Episode 5: "An Indecent Thanksgiving Proposal" (November 18, 2012)
- Season 4, Episode 5: "Turkey in a Can" (November 24, 2013)
- Season 5, Episode 4: "Dawn of the Peck" (November 23, 2014)
- Season 6, Episode 4: "Gayle Makin' Bob Sled" (November 8, 2015)
- Season 7, Episode 6: "The Quirkducers" (November 20, 2016)
- Season 8, Episode 5: "Thanks-Hoarding" (November 19, 2017)
- Season 9, Episode 7: "I Bob Your Pardon" (November 18, 2018)
- Season 10, Episode 8: "Now We're Not Cooking with Gas" (November 24, 2019)
- Season 11, Episode 7: "Diarrhea of a Poopy Kid" (November 22, 2020)
- Season 12, Episode 8: "Stuck in the Kitchen With You" (November 21, 2021)
- Season 13, Episode 8: "Putts-giving" (November 20, 2022)

==== The Cleveland Show ====
- Season 1, Episode 7: "A Brown Thanksgiving" (November 22, 2009)
- Season 2, Episode 7: "Another Bad Thanksgiving" (November 28, 2010)
- Season 4, Episode 3: "A General Thanksgiving Episode" (November 18, 2012)
- Season 4, Episode 4: "Turkey Pot Die" (November 25, 2012)

==== Family Guy ====
- Season 10, Episode 6: "Thanksgiving" (November 20, 2011)
- Season 12, Episode 7: "Into Harmony's Way" (December 8, 2013)
- Season 13, Episode 5: "Turkey Guys" (November 16, 2014)
- Season 14, Episode 6: "Peter's Sister" (November 15, 2015)
- Season 18, Episode 8: "Shanksgiving" (November 24, 2019)

==== King of the Hill ====
- Season 3, Episode 7: "Nine Pretty Darn Angry Men" (November 17, 1998)
- Season 4, Episode 7: "Happy Hank's Giving" (November 21, 1999)
- Season 5, Episode 4: "Spin the Choice" (November 19, 2000)
- Season 7, Episode 4: "Goodbye Normal Jeans" (November 24, 2002)

==== Rick and Morty ====
- Season 5, Episode 6: "Rick and Morty's Thanksploitation Spectacular" (July 25, 2021)
- Season 6, Episode 3: "Bethic Twinstinct" (September 18, 2022)

==== The Simpsons ====
- Season 2, Episode 7: "Bart vs. Thanksgiving" (November 22, 1990)
- Season 12, Episode 5: "Homer vs. Dignity" (November 26, 2000)
- Season 13, Episode 3: "Homer the Moe" (November 18, 2001)
- Season 17, Episode 18: "The Wettest Stories Ever Told" (April 23, 2006)
- Season 31, Episode 8: "Thanksgiving of Horror" (November 24, 2019)
- Season 35, Episode 7: "It's a Blunderful Life" (November 19, 2023)

==== South Park ====
- Season 1, Episode 8: "Starvin' Marvin" (November 19, 1997)
- Season 4, Episode 13: "Helen Keller! The Musical" (November 22, 2000)
- Season 15, Episode 13: "A History Channel Thanksgiving" (November 9, 2011)
- Season 17, Episode 7: "Black Friday" (November 13, 2013)

==== Christmas-related films and specials ====
Dates and networks shown correspond to the special's first telecast.

- 5 More Sleeps ’til Christmas (November 27, 2021/NBC)
- 12 Days of Christmas (1993/NBC)
- 12 Tiny Christmas Tales (December 7, 2001, Cartoon Network)
- The Adventures of Candy Claus (December 25, 1987)
- Aliens First Christmas (1991, Disney Channel)
- Amahl and the Night Visitors (1951, NBC) (most of the 1951 cast members stayed with this production until 1963)
- Amahl and the Night Visitors (1963, NBC) (all-new production)
- Amahl and the Night Visitors (1978, NBC) (all-new production)
- An Angel for Christmas (1996)
- An Elf's Story (2011)
- Babes in Toyland (1950)
- Babes in Toyland (1954)
- Babes in Toyland (1960)
- Babes in Toyland (1986/NBC)
- The Balloonatiks: Christmas Without a Claus (December 14, 1996, FOX)
- B.C.: A Special Christmas (1981/HBO)
- The Bear Who Slept Through Christmas (December 17, 1973/NBC)
- The Bears Who Saved Christmas (1994, syndication)
- Beebo Saves Christmas (December 1, 2021, The CW)
- The Bell Telephone Hour Christmas specials (1959–1968, NBC)
- Benji's Very Own Christmas Story (1978/ABC)
- The Berenstain Bears' Christmas Tree (1979/NBC)
- The Best Christmas Pageant Ever (December 5, 1983, ABC)
- Bluetoes The Christmas Elf (1988)
- Brer Rabbit's Christmas Carol (1992)
- The Cabbage Patch Kids' First Christmas (1984/ABC)
- Charlie's Christmas Secret (December 20, 1984, syndication)
- A Chipmunk Christmas (December 14, 1981, NBC)
- A Christmas Adventure (1991, syndication)
- A Christmas Calendar (1987/PBS)
- A Christmas Carol (1954/CBS)
- A Christmas Carol (1971/ABC)
- A Christmas Carol (1984/CBS)
- A Christmas Carol (1999/TNT)
- The Christmas Dinosaur (2004)
- Christmas Elves (1995)
- Christmas Every Day (1996, The Family Channel)
- Christmas In Rockefeller Center (1998/NBC)
- Christmas in Tattertown (1988/Nickelodeon)
- Christmas Is (1970, syndication)
- The Christmas Orange (2002)
- The Christmas Raccoons (1980)
- The Christmas Tree (1991/USA Network)
- Christopher the Christmas Tree (December 24, 1993, FOX)
- The City That Forgot About Christmas (1974, syndication)
- A Claymation Christmas Celebration (1987/CBS)
- CMA Country Christmas (2009–present, ABC)
- A Cool Like That Christmas (December 23, 1993, FOX)
- A Cosmic Christmas (1977)
- Cranberry Christmas (December 8, 2008, ABC Family)
- Deck the Halls (1994, syndication)
- Deck the Halls with Wacky Walls (1983/NBC)
- Donner (2001/ABC Family)
- Ed, Edd n Eddy's Jingle Jingle Jangle (2004/Cartoon Network)
- Edith Ann's Christmas (Just Say Noël) (December 14, 1996, ABC)
- Elf: Buddy's Musical Christmas (December 16, 2014, NBC)
- The Elf Who Saved Christmas (1992/USA Network)
- The Enchanted Nutcracker (1961/ABC)
- A Family Circus Christmas (1979/NBC)
- Father Christmas and the Missing Reindeer (1998)
- Felix The Cat Saves Christmas (2004)
- A Garfield Christmas (1987/CBS)
- The Ghosts of Christmas Eve (1999, Fox Family)
- The Glo-Friends Save Christmas (1985, syndication)
- Grandma Got Run Over by a Reindeer (2000/The WB)
- The Great Christmas Light Fight (a recurring reality series) (2013–present, ABC)
- Gwen Stefani's You Make It Feel Like Christmas (2017/NBC)
- The Happy Elf (2005/NBC)
- A Hobo's Christmas (1987/CBS)
- A Hollywood Hounds Christmas (1994, syndication)
- Hoops & Yoyo Ruin Christmas (2011, CBS)
- The House Without a Christmas Tree (1972/CBS)
- How the Grinch Stole Christmas! (December 18, 1966/CBS)
- How Murray Saved Christmas (December 5, 2014, NBC)
- Ice Age: A Mammoth Christmas (November 24, 2011, FOX)
- In the Nick of Time (1991/NBC)
- It's Christmas, Dr. Joe! (2004, syndication)
- Jingle Bell Rap (1991, syndication)
- Jingle Bell Rock (1995, ABC)
- Johann's Gift to Christmas (1991)
- John Grin's Christmas (1986, ABC)
- Jolly Old St. Nicholas (1994, syndication)
- Little Orphan Annie's A Very Animated Christmas (1995)
- The Little Rascals Christmas Special (1979/NBC)
- Little Spirit: Christmas in New York (December 10, 2008, NBC)
- The Littlest Angel (1969)
- Lollipop Dragon: The Great Christmas Race (1985)
- A Merry Mirthworm Christmas (1987/Showtime)
- Milroy: Santa's Misfit Mutt (1987)
- Mister Magoo's Christmas Carol (1962/NBC)
- Mog's Christmas (2023)
- A Monster Christmas (1994)
- The Moo Family Holiday Hoe-Down (1992)
- A Mouse, a Mystery and Me (1987/NBC)
- Mr. Krueger's Christmas (1980/NBC)
- My Christmas Special (2009/PBS)
- The Nativity (1952/CBS)
- Nick & Noel (1993)
- The Night B4 Christmas (2003)
- The Night Before Christmas: A Mouse Tale (2002)
- The Night Before Christmas (1968, syndicated)
- The Night the Animals Talked (1970/ABC)
- Nine Dog Christmas (2004)
- Noël (1992, NBC)
- The Nutcracker (1958, CBS) (presented on Playhouse 90)
- The Nutcracker (1965, CBS) (German-American co-production, with changed plotline)
- The Nutcracker (Baryshnikov version) (1977, CBS)
- The Nutcracker (2011, PBS) (presented on Live from Lincoln Center)
- Nutcracker on Ice (several versions)
- The Nuttiest Nutcracker (1999, CBS)
- O Christmas Tree (1994)
- Olive, the Other Reindeer (1999, FOX)
- Online Adventures of Ozzie the Elf (1997)
- Pillow People Save Christmas (1988)
- The Pink Panther in: A Pink Christmas (1978/ABC)
- P.J.'s Unfunnybunny Christmas (1993/ABC)
- The Poky Little Puppy's First Christmas (1992)
- Popeye's Voyage: The Quest for Pappy (2004/FOX)
- The Promise (1963)
- Raggedy Ann and Andy in The Great Santa Claus Caper (1978/CBS)
- Red Boots for Christmas (1995)
- Reindeer In Here (2022, CBS)
- Roxanne's Best Christmas Ever (1998)
- Santa and the Three Bears (1970, syndication)
- Santa Claus and the Magic Drum (1996)
- The Santa Claus Brothers (December 14, 2001, Disney Channel)
- Santa Mouse and the Ratdeer (2000/Fox Family)
- Santa's Christmas Crash (1995)
- Santa's Christmas Snooze (1995)
- Santa's First Christmas (1992)
- Santa's Last Christmas (1999)
- Santa's Magic Book (1996)
- Santa's Magic Toy Bag (1983/Showtime)
- Santa's Pocket Watch (1980)
- Santabear's First Christmas (1986/ABC)
- Santabear's High Flying Adventure (1987/CBS)
- Santa vs. the Snowman (December 12, 1997, ABC)
- Simple Gifts: Six Episodes for Christmas (1977)
- Snowden's Christmas (1999)
- A Snow White Christmas (1980/CBS)
- A Solid Gold Christmas (1982, syndication)
- The Spirit of Christmas (1953)
- The Stableboy's Christmas (1979, syndication)
- A Star for Jeremy (1982)
- The Stingiest Man in Town (1956/NBC)
- The Story of Santa Claus (1996/CBS)
- The Soulmates in the Gift of Light (1991)
- Timmy's Special Delivery (1993)
- Timothy Tweedle: The First Christmas Elf (December 25, 2000, Toon Disney)
- The Tiny Tree (December 14, 1975, NBC)
- Tom and Jerry in A Cat and Mouse Christmas (1977/ABC)
- Tom and Jerry: Santa's Little Helpers (2014)
- The Trolls and the Christmas Express (1981/HBO)
- Twas the Night Before Christmas (1977/ABC)
- The Twelve Days of Christmas (1993/NBC)
- The Ugly Duckling's Christmas Wish (1996, syndication)
- Up on the Housetop (1992, syndication)
- A Very Boy Band Holiday (2021/ABC)
- A Very Merry Cricket (December 14, 1973/ABC)
- A Very Pink Christmas (December 7, 2011/ABC Family)
- A Very Retail Christmas (December 24, 1990/NBC)
- A Very Solar Holiday Opposites Special (2021/Hulu)
- We Wish You a Merry Christmas (1994, syndication)
- A Wish for Wings That Work (1991/CBS)
- The Wish That Changed Christmas (1991/CBS)
- Where's Waldo? The Merry X-mas Mix Up! (1992)
- Why the Bears Dance on Christmas Eve (December 12, 1977, ABC)
- The Wonderful World of Disney: Magical Holiday Celebration (2016, ABC)
- Yes, Virginia, There is a Santa Claus (1974/ABC)
- Ziggy's Gift (1982/ABC)
- The Zoomer Crew's First Christmas (2000)

==== Television series-related ====
Specials based on a television series but which were not a regular time-slot episode.

- Care Bears Nutcracker Suite (1988/Disney Channel; Canadian production)
- He-Man and She-Ra: A Christmas Special (1985/syndication)
- Inspector Gadget Saves Christmas (1992/NBC)
- A Pinky and the Brain Christmas (1995/The WB)
- Strawberry Shortcake's Berry Merry Christmas (2003)
- A Very Venture Christmas (2004/Cartoon Network-Adult Swim)
- The Haunted House Christmas Special: Grandma's Wish, Wheat Donggwi from North Korea (신비아파트 크리스마스 특별편: 할머니의 소원, 북에서 온 밀동귀) (2020) - South Korea

=== St. Patrick's Day film and television specials ===
- Are You Afraid Of The Dark?: "The Tale of Jake And The Leprechaun" (1990)
- American Dragon Jake Long:
  - "The Heist" (2005)
  - "Fool's Gold" (2006)
- Bob’s Burgers: "Flat-Top o' the Morning to Ya" (2020)
- Andy J: "I Will Have You" (2007)
- The Care Bears: "Grumpy's Three Wishes" (1986)
- Chicago Party Aunt: "St. Patrick's Day" (2022)
- Chip 'n Dale: Rescue Rangers: "The Last Leprechaun" (1989)
- Curious George: "Chasing Rainbows" (2009)
- Doc McStuffins: St. Patrick's Day Dilemma (2016)
- Droopy: "Droopy Leprechaun" (1958)
- DuckTales "Luck O' the Ducks" (1987)
- Extreme Ghostbusters: "The Luck of the Irish" (1997)
- The Fairly OddParents: "Crocker of Gold" (2010)
- Futurama: "The Luck of the Fryrish" (2001)
- The Garfield Show: "Lucky Charm" (2009)
- Handy Manny: "St. Patrick's Day" (2012)
- The Huckleberry Hound Show: "Huck of the Irish" (1961)
- Inspector Gadget: "Luck of the Irish" (1983)
- Kids Incorporated : "The leprechaun" (1984)
- Johnny Bravo: "Blarney Buddies" (1997)
- Jackie Chan Adventures: "Tough Luck" (2002)
- Noveltoons: "Leprechaun's Gold" (1949)
- The Leprechauns' Christmas Gold: a Rankin-Bass St. Patrick's Day/Christmas special (1981)
- Lil' Bush: "St. Patrick's Day" (2008)
- Lippy the Lion & Hardy Har Har: "Shamrocked" (1963)
- Looney Tunes Cartoons: "Lepreconned" (2021)
- The Loud House: "No Such Luck" (2017)
- Martin Mystery: Rage of the Leprechaun (2006)
- Mickey Mouse Clubhouse: Minnie's Rainbow (2009)
- Mickey Mouse Mixed-Up Adventures: "Petey O'Pete" (2020)
- Monsters vs. Aliens: "When Luck Runs Out" (2014)
- Mucha Lucha: "Shamrock and Roll" (2004)
- New Looney Tunes: "Erin Go Bugs" (2018)
- Phineas and Ferb: "Just Our Luck" (2014)
- Polly Pocket (2018): "Lepre-Can't" (2022)
- Puppy Dog Pals:
  - "Somewhere Under the Rainbow" (2020)
  - "Pups of the Dance" (2021)
  - "Find That Fiddle" (2022)
- The Ren & Stimpy Show "A Hard Day's Luck" (1994)
- The Real Ghostbusters: "The Scaring of the Green" (1987)
- Rupert Bear: "Rupert And the leprechauns" (1992)
- Rugrats/All Grown Up!:
  - "Lady Luck" (1998)
  - "Tweenage Tycoons" (2003)
  - "Lucky 13" (2004)
- The Busy World of Richard Scarry: "Patrick Pig Learns To Talk" (1994)
- The Simpsons:
  - "Homer vs. the Eighteenth Amendment" (1997)
  - "Sex, Pies and Idiot Scrapes" (2008)
- South Park: Credigree Weed St. Patrick's Day Special (TV Episode 2022)
- SpongeBob SquarePants: "What Ever Happened to SpongeBob?" (2008)
- Strawberry Shortcake: Berry in the Big City: "Lucky Berry" (2022)
- The Super Mario Bros. Super Show!: "Mighty McMario and the Pot of Gold" (1989)
- Teen Titans Go!:
  - "Beast Boy's Bad Luck, and It's Bad" (2016)
  - "The Gold Standard" (2017)
- Teletubbies: "Irish Dancing" (1998)
- The Tom and Jerry Show: "The Wearing of the Green" (2021)
- Uncle Grandpa: "The Lepre-Con" (2016)

=== Valentine's Day film and television specials ===
==== Children and family shows ====
- 6teen: "Stupid Over Cupid" (2005)
- The 7D: "For the Love of Cheese" (2014)
- 101 Dalmatians: The Series:
  - "Love 'Em and Flea 'Em" (1997)
  - "Valentine Daze" (1997)
- Abby Hatcher: Hearts and Hugs Day (2019)
- The Adventures of Jimmy Neutron, Boy Genius: "Love Potion 976/J" (2004)
- Adventures of Sonic the Hedgehog:
  - "Best Hedgehog" (1993)
  - "Lovesick Sonic" (1993)
- Adventures in Wonderland: "A Change of Heart" (1993)
- Alice's Wonderland Bakery: "A Heart-Filled Harmony" (2024)
- The Amazing World of Gumball: "The Matchmaker" (2017)
- American Dragon: Jake Long:
  - "The Ski Trip" (2005)
  - "The Love Cruise" (2007)
- Amphibia: "Dating Season" (2019)
- Angelina Ballerina: "Angelina's Valentine" / "The Royal Banquet" (2002)
- Angelina Ballerina: The Next Steps: "Angelina and the Big News" / "Angelina's Secret Valentine" (2010)
- Arthur:
  - "Love Notes for Muffy" (1998)
  - "The Long, Dull Winter" (1999)
  - "Buster's Secret Admirer" (2010)
  - "Mr. Ratburn and the Special Someone" (2019)
- The Backyardigans: "Special Delivery" (2007)
- Barney & Friends: "Be My Valentine Love, Barney" (2000)
- Bear in the Big Blue House: "Love Is All You Need" (1998)
- Big City Greens: "Valentine's Dance" (2019)
- Big Nate:
  - "Valentine's Day of Horror" (2022)
  - "Valentine's Day of Horror: Chapter II" (2023)
  - "Valentine's Day of Horror: Chapter III" (2026)
- Blue's Clues: "Love Day" (2004)
- Blue's Clues & You!: "What I Like About Blue" (2021)
- Blue's Room: "It's Hug Day" (2005)
- The Book of Pooh: "My Gloomy Valentine" (2001)
- Bunsen Is a Beast
  - "Handsome Beast" (2017)
  - "Guinea Some Lovin'!" (2017)
  - "Bromeo and Juliet" (2017)
  - "Beauty or the Beast" (2018)
- Caillou:
  - "Mystery Valentine" (2000)
  - "Caillou's Valentine" (2007)
- Camp Lazlo
  - "Valentine's Day" (2007)
  - "Lazlo's First Crush" (2007)
- Captain Flamingo: "Change of Heart" (2007)
- The Care Bears:
  - "The Care Bears Adventures in Wonderland" (1987)
  - "The Lost Gift / Lotsa Heart's Wish" (1988)
- The Cat in the Hat Knows a Lot About That!: "Pick Your Friends" (2011)
- ChalkZone: Pop Goes The Balloon (2003)
- The Charlie Brown and Snoopy Show: "Lucy Loves Schroeder" (1985)
- Clifford the Big Red Dog:
  - "T-Bone, Dog About Town" / "Clifford's Big Heart" (2001)
  - "Big Hearted T-Bone" / "Cleo's Valentine Surprise" (2002)
- Clifford the Big Red Dog (2019): "Clifford's Valentine Collection" (2021)
- Clifford's Puppy Days:
  - "Your Secret Valentine" / "Perfect Pet" (2004)
  - "Valentines Schmalentines" / "Sweetheart's Dance" (2006)
- Curious George: "Happy Valentine's Day, George" (2015)
- Cyberchase:
  - "Hugs & Witches" (2003)
  - "A Garden Grows in Botlyn" (2020)
- Daniel Tiger's Neighborhood:
  - "I Love You, Mom" (2012)
  - "It's Love Day!/Daniel's Love Day Surprise" (2015)
- Danny Phantom: "Lucky in Love" (2005)
- Darkwing Duck: "My Valentine Ghoul" (1992)
- Dinosaur Train:
  - "Erma and the Conductor" (2012)
  - "Love Day" (2020)
- Doc McStuffins: "My Huggy Valentine" (2013)
- Dora the Explorer:
  - "Te Amo" (2001)
  - "Best Friends" (2003)
  - "The Grumpy Old Troll Gets Married" (2011)
- Doug: "Doug Plays Cupid" (1999)
- Dragon Tales: "Hands Together" (2001)
- DuckTales: "A Duck Tales' Valentine" (1990)
- Ed, Edd n Eddy: "Ed, Edd n Eddy's Hanky Panky Hullabaloo" (2005)
- Elena of Avalor: "Sweetheart's Day" (2020)
- The Emperor's New School: "Everyone Loves Kuzco" (2008)
- The Fairly OddParents:
  - "Love Struck!" (2003)
  - "Love at First Height" (2005)
  - "Love Triangle" (2011)
- Fanboy & Chum Chum: "Robo-mance" (2012)
- Fancy Nancy: "Mon Amie... Grace?" (2019)
- Fish Hooks
  - "Two Clams in Love" (2011)
  - "Bea Dates Milo" (2012)
  - "Oscar's Secret Admirer" (2012)
  - "Send Me an Angel Fish" (2012)
  - "Fish Lips Sink Ships" (2012)
  - "Fish Prom" (2013)
  - "Live at the Hamsterwood Bowl" (2013)
  - "Labor of Love" (2013)
- The Flintstones:
  - "The Engagement Ring" (1960)
  - "Love Letters on the Rocks" (1960)
  - "Fred Flintstone Woos Again" (1961)
  - "Latin Lover" (1962)
  - "I Yabba-Dabba Do!" (1993)
- Franklin: "Franklin's Valentines" (1998)
- Go, Diego, Go!: "Sammy's Valentine" (2007)
- Go, Dog. Go!: "A Ball for All" (2021)
- The Grim Adventures of Billy & Mandy
  - "Love is "Evol" Spelled Backwards" (2003)
  - "The Greatest Love Story Ever Told Ever" (2007)
- Gravity Falls: "The Love God" (2014)
- Handy Manny:
  - "Valentine's Day" (2008)
  - "Valentine's Day Party" (2013)
- Harvey Beaks: "Anti-Valentine's Day" (2015)
- Hey Arnold!: "Arnold's Valentine" (1997)
- Henry Hugglemonster: "Monsterly Ever After" (2015)
- Higglytown Heroes: "A Valentine for Miss Fern; The Totally Secret Valentine" (2006)
- House of Mouse: "Goofy's Valentine Date" (2001)
- If You Give a Mouse a Cookie: "If You Give a Mouse a Valentine's Cookie" (2020)
- Jacob Two-Two: "Jacob Two Two and the Valentine's Day Disaster" (2005)
- The Jetsons: "Judy's Elopement" (1985)
- Johnny Bravo: "It's Valentine's Day Johnny Bravo" (2004)
- Kate & Mim-Mim: "Valentine Friends" (2014)
- Katie and Orbie: "Hearts!" (2002)
- Kick Buttowski: Suburban Daredevil
  - "For the Love of Gunther" (2010)
  - "Love Stinks!" (2011)
  - "Bromance" (2012)
- Kim Possible: "The Cupid Effect" (2007)
- Lilo & Stitch: The Series: "Hunkahunka" (2004)
- Little Bear: "Valentines Day" (1999)
- Little Einsteins: "Annie's Love Song" (2007)
- Llama Llama: "I Heart You!" (2018)
- Lloyd in Space: "Love Beam #9" (2002)
- Looney Tunes Cartoons: "Looney Tunes Cartoons Valentine's Extwavaganza!" (2022)
- The Loud House: "Singled Out/Brave the Last Dance" (2020)
- Madeline: "Madeline's Valentine" (2001)
- Martha Speaks: "Martha and the Thief of Hearts" (2009)
- Max & Ruby: "Max's Valentine" (2003)
- Maya & Miguel: "Cupid" (2007)
- Mickey Mouse Clubhouse: "A Surprise for Minnie" (2006)
- Mickey and the Roadster Racers/Mickey Mouse Mixed-Up Adventures:
  - "The Happiest Helpers Cruise!" (2017)
  - "Happy Valentine Helpers" (2020)
- Mickey Mouse:
  - "Goofy's First Love" (2015)
  - "Locked in Love" (2017)
- Mighty Express: "Chug-a-Love Day" (2021)
- Minnie's Bow-Toons: "My Bunny Valentine" (2024)
- Miss BG: "Miss BG’s Gets a Valentine" (2005)
- Molly of Denali: "Valentine's Day Disaster/Porcupine Slippers" (2020)
- Muppet Babies: "Happy Villain-tine's Day" (2022)
- My Friends Tigger & Pooh: "How to Say I Love Roo" (2007)
- My Little Pony: Friendship Is Magic:
  - "Hearts and Hooves Day" (2012)
  - "The Break Up Break Down" (2018)
- Nature Cat: "Happy Halentine's Day!" (2016)
- The New Adventures of Winnie the Pooh: "Un-Valentine's Day" (1989)
- The New Woody Woodpecker Show: "Date With Destiny" (2000)
- Nilus the Sandman: "Cupid's Bow" (1996)
- Ni Hao Kai-Lan : "Kai-Lan's Big Surprise" (2009)
- Oobi: "Valentine" (2005)
- PAW Patrol: "Pups Save Friendship Day" (2016)
- PB&J Otter: "Ducking Out on Valentine's Day" (2000)
- Peanuts by Schulz:
  - "A Little Love" (2016)
  - "Just for Love" (2016)
- Peg + Cat:
  - "The Romeo and Juliet Problem" (2014)
  - "The Wonderland Problem" (2015)
  - "The Valentine's Day Problem" (2017)
  - "The Mariachi Problem" (2017)
- Peppa Pig:
  - "Valentine's Day" (2020)
  - "Valentine's Pizza" (2023)
  - "Valentine's Surprise" (2023)
  - "Disco Limo" (2024)
- The Penguins of Madagascar:
  - "Monkey Love" (2009)
  - "Otter Things Have Happened" (2009)
  - "Love Takes Flightless" (2012)
  - "Tunnel of Love" (2015)
- Phineas and Ferb:
  - "That Sinking Feeling" (2009)
  - "Act Your Age" (2015)
- Pingu: "Pingi's Valentine Card" (2003)
- Pinkalicious & Peterrific:
  - "Pink Love" (2019)
  - "Cupid Calls It Quits" (2021)
- The Pink Panther: "Valentine Pink" (1993)
- Pixel Pinkie:
  - "Valentine's Day" (2009)
  - "Truth Or Dare" (2009)
- The Powerpuff Girls: "Keen On Keane" (2002)
- Puppy Dog Pals:
  - "Valentine Surprise" (2019)
  - "Valentine's Day Mix-Up" (2020)
  - "My Bobby Valentine" (2021)
  - "A Valentine's Gift for Ana" (2022)
- Pupstruction: "Valentine's Day Dogs" (2024)
- Recess : "My Funny Valentines" (2000)
- The Replacements
  - "CindeRiley" (2006)
  - "The Perfect Date" (2007)
  - "Kumquat Day" (2007)
- Robot and Monster: "J.D. Loves Gart" / "Misery Date" (2015)
- Rock Paper Scissors: "Paper's Big Lie" (2024)
- Rocko's Modern Life:
  - "Love Spanked" (1993)
  - "S.W.A.K." (1996)
- Rolie Polie Olie: "Looove Bug" (1999)
- Rugrats / All Grown Up!:
  - "Be My Valentine" (2000)
  - "It's Cupid, Stupid" (2004)
- The Save-Ums!: "Make Those Valentines!" (2005)
- Sesame Street: "Episode 4606: Valentine's Day" (2016)
- Sheriff Callie's Wild West: "The Heartless Valentine's Day" (2017)
- The Smurfs: "My Smurfy Valentine" (1983)
- The Snoopy Show: "Well, I’ll be a Brown-Eyed Beagle" (2022)
- The Spectacular Spider-Man: "Gangland" (2009)
- Spidey and His Amazing Friends: "Villaintines Day" (2024)
- Spirit Riding Free: Riding Academy: "Palentine's Day" (2020)
- SpongeBob SquarePants
  - "Valentine's Day" (2000)
  - "Krusty Love" (2002)
  - "Gary in Love" (2010)
  - "Tunnel of Glove" (2011)
  - "Love That Squid" (2011)
  - "Married to Money" (2016)
- Strawberry Shortcake: Berry in the Big City
  - "Will You Be My Lemon-tine?" (2022)
  - "Aunt Praline's Sweetie Pie" (2024)
- SuperKitties: "Vanishing Valentines" (2024)
- Super Monsters: "Monster Heart-Friend Night" (2019)
- Super Why!:
  - "Peter Rabbit" (2009)
  - "Alice in Wonderland" (2009)
  - "Cinderella: The Prince's Side of the Story" (2009)
- The Sylvester & Tweety Mysteries: "Is Paris Stinking?" (1997)
- Teacher's Pet: "Taint Valentine's Day" (2002)
- Teen Titans Go!:
  - "Be Mine" (2014)
  - "How 'Bout Some Effort" (2016)
  - "Looking for Love" (2023)
- Teletubbies: "Love Each Other Very Much" (2023)
- Timon & Pumbaa: "Timon in Love" (1999)
- Timothy Goes to School: "Be My Valentine" (2002)
- Totally Spies!:
  - "MAtchMaker" (2002),
  - "Green With N.V." (2003)
- T.O.T.S.: "The Valentine Spirit" (2020)
- Trolls: TrollsTopia: "Palentine's Day" (2021)
- T.U.F.F. Puppy:
  - "Puppy Love" (2010)
  - "Snap Dad" (2011)
  - "Love Bird" (2013)
  - "Til Doom Do Us Part" (2014)
  - "Girlfriend or Foe?" (2014)
  - "T.U.F.F. Love" (2015)
- True and the Rainbow Kingdom: "Happy Hearts Day" (2019)
- Underdog: "Simon Says, Be My Valentine" (1967)
- Unikitty!: "Perfect Moment" (2019)
- Vampirina: "Vee Is for Valentine" (2018)
- Veggietales: "Duke and the Great Pie War" (2005)
- The VeggieTales Show: "The Power of Love" (2020)
- Wallykazam!:
  - "Buddy Pal Friend Day" (2016)
  - "The Chickephant's Getting Married" (2017)
- Wander Over Yonder: "The Date" (2014)
- The Weekenders: "My Punky Valentine" / "Brain Envy" (2001)
- Welcome to Pooh Corner: "Pooh's Funny Valentine's Day" (1984)
- What's New, Scooby-Doo?: "A Scooby-Doo Valentine" (2005)
- The Wild Thornberrys: "Operation Valentine" (2001)
- Wonder Pets!: "Save the Lovebugs!" (2010)
- Woody Woodpecker: "I'm with Cupid, Stupid" (2018)
- Wordgirl: "Cherish is the Word" (2011)
- WordWorld: "My Fuzzy Valentine" / "Love, Bug" (2009)
- Wow! Wow! Wubbzy!:
  - "Mr. Valentine" (2007)
  - "Cupid's Helper" (2009)
  - "My Speedy Valentine" (2009)
- Yo Gabba Gabba: "Love" (2008)

==== Comedy & sitcoms ====
- 2 Broke Girls: "And the Broken Hearts" (2012)
- 3rd Rock from the Sun: "Dick Puts the 'ID' in Cupid" (2000)
- 8 Simple Rules: "Torn Between Two Lovers" (2005)
- 30 Rock:
  - "Up All Night" (2007)
  - "St. Valentine's Day" (2009)
  - "Anna Howard Shaw Day" (2010)
  - "Hey, Baby, What's Wrong" (2012)
- A Different World:
  - "Dr. Cupid" (1988)
  - "Breaking Up Is Hard To Do" (1989)
  - "Love, Hillman-Style" (1991)
- Abbott Elementary: "Valentine's Day" (2023)
- About a Boy: "About a Cat Party" (2015)
- According to Jim: "Blow-Up" (2002)
- The Adventures of Ozzie and Harriet: "The Valentine Show" (1953)
- Alice: "My Funny Valentine Tux' (1980)
- American Dad!: "May the Best Stan Win" (2010)
- American Housewife: "Time For Love" (2017)
- Are We There Yet?: "The Valentine's Day Episode" (2011)
- Arrested Development: "Marta Compllex" (2004)
- At Home with Amy Sedaris: "Valentine's Day" (2020)
- Becker:
  - "Love! Lies! Bleeding!" (1999)
  - "V-Day" (2002)
- Better With You: "Better With Valentine's Day" (2011)
- The Big Bang Theory:
  - "The Large Hadron Collision" (2010)
  - "The Tangible Affection Proof" (2013)
  - "The Locomotive Manipulation" (2014)
  - "The Valentino Submergence" (2016)
- Big Mouth: "My Furry Valentine" (2019)
- Black-ish / Mixed-ish:
  - "Big Night, Big Fight" (2015)
  - "The Name Game" (2017)
  - "Dreamgirls and Boys" (2019)
  - "The Gauntlet" (2020)
  - "This Charming Man" (2020)
- Bob Hearts Abishola: "Black Ice" (2020)
- Bob's Burgers:
  - "My Fuzzy Valentine" (2013)
  - "Can't Buy Me Math" (2015)
  - "The Gene and Courtney Show" (2016)
  - "Bob Actually" (2017)
  - "V for Valentine-detta" (2018)
  - "Bed, Bob & Beyond" (2019)
  - "Romancing the Beef" (2021)
- Boy Meets World:
  - "Risky Business" (1992)
  - "First Girlfriend's Club" (1998)
  - "My Baby Valentine" (1999)
- Cheers: "Sam Time Next Year" (1991)
- City Guys: "Dating Games" (2000)
- The Cleveland Show:
  - "A Short Story and a Tall Tale" (2011)
  - "Here Comes the Bribe" (2013)
- Coach: "Call Me Cupid" (1995)
- Community:
  - "Communication Studies" (2010)
  - "Early 21st Century Romanticism" (2011)
- The Conners: "Valentine's Day Treats and Credit Card Cheats" (2024)
- Cosby: "Valentine's Day" (1997)
- Cybill:
  - "Call Me Irresponsible" (1995)
  - "Valentine's Day" (1997)
- Dave's World: "Loves Me Like a Rock" (1996)
- Dr. Ken:
  - "Dave's Valentine" (2016)
  - "A Dr. Ken Valentine's Day" (2017)
- Everybody Hates Chris: "Everybody Hates Valentine's Day" (2006)
- Everybody Loves Raymond:
  - "Diamonds" (1997)
  - "Silent Partners" (2001)
- Family Guy:
  - "Valentine's Day in Quahog" (2013)
  - "Boy (Dog) Meets Girl Dog" (2018)
- Family Matters:
  - "My Broken-Hearted Valentine" (1992)
  - "Heart Strings" (1993)
  - "Le jour d'amour" (1997)
- Family Reunion: "Remember My Funny Valentine?" (2021)
- Frasier:
  - "Three Valentines" (1999)
  - "Out With Dad" (2000)
- Frasier (2023):
  - "Cyrano, Cyrano" (2024)
- Friends/Joey:
  - "The One with the Candy Hearts" (1995)
  - "The One With Unagi" (2000)
  - "The One with the Birthing Video" (2002)
  - "The One with Phoebe's Wedding" (2004)
  - "Joey and the Valentine's Date" (2005)
- The Fresh Prince of Bel Air: "Stop Will in the Name of Love" (1994)
- Full House:
  - "Little Shop of Sweaters" (1989)
  - "The Heartbreak Kid" (1993)
  - "Joey's Funny Valentine" (1994)
  - "Dateless in San Francisco" (1995)
- Futurama:
  - "Put Your Head on My Shoulders" (2000)
  - "Love and Rocket" (2002)
- George Lopez: "The Valentine's Day Massacre" (2003)
- Ghosts: "A Date to Remember" (2023)
- Gimme a Break!: "Valentine" (1984)
- The Goldbergs / Schooled:
  - "Lainey Loves Lionel" (2016)
  - "Agassi" (2017)
  - "My Valentine Boy" (2019)
  - "Preventa Mode" (2020)
  - "A Peck of Familial Love" (2022)
  - "Singled Out" (2020)
- The Golden Girls: "Valentine's Day" (1989)
- Grace Under Fire: "Valentine's Day" (1994)
- Happy Days: "Be My Valentine" (1978)
- Happy Endings: "The St. Valentine's Day Maxssacre" (2012)
- Harley Quinn: "Harley Quinn: A Very Problematic Valentine's Day Special" (2023)
- Head of the Class: "Valentine's Day" (1987)
- Herman's Head: "My Funny Valentine" (1993)
- Home Improvement:
  - "Baby, It's Cold Outside" (1992)
  - "A Funny Valentine" (1997)
- Honey, I Shrunk the Kids: The TV Show: "Honey, I'm in the Mood for Love" (1998)
- How I Met Your Father: "A Terrible, Horrible, No Good, Very Bad Valentine's Day" (2023)
- How I Met Your Mother:
  - "Rabbit or Duck" (2010)
  - "Desperation Day" (2011)
  - "The Drunk Train" (2012)
- In the House: "My Crazy Valentine" (1996)
- The Jeffersons: "I Buy the Songs" (1981)
- The King of Queens:
  - "S'Ain't Valentine's" (1999)
  - "Meet By-Product" (2000)
  - "Animal Attraction" (2003)
  - "Gorilla Warfare" (2005)
- King of the Hill:
  - "I Remember Mono" (1998)
  - "I'm With Cupid" (2002)
- Last Man Standing: "Tasers" (2014)
- Less than Perfect: "Valentine's Day" (2003)
- Letterkenny: "Valentimes Day" (2019)
- Life in Pieces:
  - "Tattoo Valentine Guitar Pregnant" (2016)
  - "Necklace Rescue Chef Negotiator" (2017)
- Life with Derek: "Rumor Mill" (2008)
- Living Single: "Singing the Blues" (1995)
- The Loretta Young Show: "The Black Lace Valentine" (1959)
- Love & War: "Valentine's Day" (1995)
- Mad About You:
  - "Love Among the Tiles" (1993)
  - "Valentine's Day" (1999)
- Major Dad: "Valentine's Day" (1991)
- Malcolm in the Middle: "If Boys Were Girls" (2003)
- Mama's Family: "My Phony Valentine" (1989)
- Man with a Plan:
  - "Valentine's Day" (2017)
  - "Adam's Turtle-y Awesome Valentine's Day" (2018)
- The Many Loves of Dobie Gillis: "Lassie Get Lost' (1963)
- Married... with Children:
  - "Peggy Loves Al - Yeah, Yeah, Yeah" (1988)
  - "Valentine's Day Massacre" (1994)
- The Middle:
  - "Valentine's Day" (2010)
  - "Valentine's Day II" (2011)
  - "Valentine's Day III" (2012)
  - "Valentine's Day IV" (2013)
  - "Valentine's Day VI" (2015)
- Mike & Molly:
  - "First Valentine's Day" (2011)
  - "Valentine's Piggyback" (2012)
- Modern Family:
  - "My Funky Valentine" (2010)
  - "Bixby's Back" (2011)
  - "Heart Broken" (2013)
  - "Valentine's Day 4: Twisted Sister" (2015)
  - "Do You Believe in Magic" (2017)
  - "Written in the Stars" (2018)
  - "Paris" (2020)
- Mom: "Sparkling Banter and a Failing Steel Town" (2019)
- Mr. Belvedere: "Valentine's Day" (1986)
- Mrs. Brown's Boys: "Mammy's Valentine" (2013)
- Murphy Brown: "Why Do Fools Fall in Love?" (1989)
- The Nanny:
  - "Love is a Many Blundered Thing" (1996)
  - "The Bank Robbery" (1997)
- Newhart: "Once I Had a Secret Love" (1985)
- New Girl:
  - "Valentine's Day" (2012)
  - "The Crawl" (2015)
  - "Operation: Bobcat" (2017)
- Night Court: "Billie's Valentine" (1985)
- Not Dead Yet: "Not a Valentine Yet" (2024)
- Andy J: "Tilt My Hat (At the Sun)" (2005)
- The Office:
  - "Valentine's Day" (2006)
  - "Blood Drive" (2009)
  - "The Manager and the Salesman" (2010)
  - "PDA" (2011)
  - "Special Project" (2012)
  - "Couples Discount" (2013)
- One Day at a Time: "One Valentine's Day at a Time" (2019)
- Parks and Recreation:
  - "Galentine's Day" (2010)
  - "Operation Ann" (2012)
  - "Galentine's Day" (2014)
- Punky Brewster: "My Aged Valentine" (1985)
- The Proud Family: "I Love You Penny Proud" (2002)
- The Proud Family: Louder and Prouder: "The End of Innocence" (2023)
- The Really Loud House: "Louds in Love" (2024)
- Reba: "Valentine's Day" (2003)
- Roseanne: "Valentine's Day" (1991)
- Sabrina the Teenage Witch:
  - "First Kiss" (1997)
  - "The Equalizer" (1998)
  - "Sabrina, the Matchmaker" (1999)
  - "Love in Bloom" (2000)
  - "Love Is a Many Complicated Thing" (2001)
  - "I Think I Love You" (2002)
- The Santa Clauses: "Chapter Eight: Floofy" (2023)
- See Dad Run: "See Dad Nail Valentine’s Day" (2014)
- The Simpsons:
  - "I Love Lisa" (1993)
  - "I'm with Cupid" (1999)
  - "Love, Springfieldian Style" (2008)
  - "The Daughter Also Rises" (2012)
  - "Specs and the City" (2014)
  - "Love Is in the N2-O2-Ar-CO2-Ne-He-CH4" (2016)
- Single Parents:
  - "A Cash-Grab Cooked Up By the Crepe Paper Industry" (2019)
  - "Chez Second Grade" (2020)
- Sister, Sister:
  - "Valentine's Day" (1996)
  - "Three the Heart Way" (1997)
  - "Ladies' Choice" (1998)
- Solar Opposites: "An Earth Shatteringly Romantic Solar Valentine's Day Opposites Special" (2024)
- Son of a Critch: "My Funny Valentine" (2024)
- South Park:
  - "Tom's Rhinoplasty" (1998)
  - "Cupid Ye" (2023)
- Speechless:
  - "V-a-l-Valentine's D-a-Day" (2017)
  - "J-i-Jimmy V-a-l-Valentine" (2019)
- Step by Step: "Love, Port Washington Style" (1993)
- Still Standing: "Still Romancing" (2003)
- Suburgatory: "Blowtox and Burlap" (2013)
- Superstore:
  - "Valentine's Day" (2017)
  - "Love Birds" (2019)
- That Girl: "The Earrings" (1969)
- Two and a Half Men:
  - "Sips, Sonnets and Sodomy" (2012)
  - "Advantage: Fat, Flying Baby" (2013)
- Two Guys, a Girl and a Pizza Place: "Two Guys, a Girl and Valentine's Day" (1999)
- Two of a Kind: "First Crush" (1998)
- Up All Night: "Day After Valentine's Day" (2012)
- Veronica's Closet: "Veronica's Candy Panties" (2000)
- Webster: "Love Papadapolis Style" (1986)
- Wendell & Vinnie: "Valentine's & the Cultural Experience" (2013)
- What I Like About You:
  - "Valentine's Day" (2003)
  - "Stupid Cupid" (2005)
- Who's The Boss?: "Jonathon Plays Cupid" (1986)
- Will & Grace: "Dance Cards & Greeting Cards" (2005)
- Wings: "Looking for Love in All the Wrong Places" (1991)
- The Wonder Years: "St. Valentine's Day Massacre" (1990)
- The Wonder Years (2021): "The Valentine's Day Dance" (2022)
- Work With Me: "Crush"
- Yes, Dear: "House of Cards" (2003)
- Young & Hungry: "Young & Valentine's Day" (2017)

=== Easter film and television specials ===
- A Chucklewood Easter (1987)
- A Claymation Easter (1992, CBS)
- A Family Circus Easter (1982)
- The Easter Chipmunk (1995)
- Andy Williams and the NBC Kids: Easter in Rome (1987)
- The Berenstain Bears' Easter Surprise (1981, NBC)
- Bob's Easter Full House (1985)
- Bugs Bunny's Easter Special (1977)
- Daffy Duck's Easter Show (1980)
- Easter Egg Mornin' (1991)
- Easter Fever (1980)
- Easter Is (1974)
- Easter Land (2019)
- Easterland 2 (2020)
- Here Comes Peter Cottontail (1971)
- Hodge Saves Easter (2020)
- Ice Age: The Great Egg-Scapade (2016, FOX)
- It's the Easter Beagle, Charlie Brown (1974, CBS)
- Jesus of Nazareth (1977)
- The Last Hangover aka Especial de Natal: Se Beber, Não Ceie (2018)
- An Easter Story (Showtime) (1983)
- Peter and the Magic Egg (1983)
- Perry Como's Easter by the Sea (1978)
- Perry Como's Easter in Guadalajara (1982)
- The Easter Bunny Is Comin' to Town (1977, ABC)
- The Easter Egg (1987)
- The First Easter Rabbit (1976, NBC)
- Tiny Toon Spring Break (1994, Fox Kids)
- Thumpkin and the Easter Bunnies (1996)
- Yogi the Easter Bear (1994)

==== Comedy & sitcoms ====
- The Simpsons:
  - "Simpsons Bible Stories" (1999)
  - "Dark Knight Court" (2013)
- South Park:
  - "Quintuplets 2000" (2000)
  - "Fantastic Easter Special" (2007)
  - "Margaritaville" (2009)
  - "Jewpacabra" (2009)

== By franchise ==
- List of 1980s Strawberry Shortcake television specials
- List of One Piece television specials
- List of Lupin III television specials
- List of Looney Tunes television specials
- List of Dr. Seuss television specials

== By OVAs ==
=== 1980s ===
==== 1983 ====
- Dallos
- Lion Books

==== 1984 ====
- Birth
- Cream Lemon
- Creamy Mami, the Magic Angel
- Ginga Hyōryū Vifam
- Lolita Anime

==== 1985 ====
- Angel's Egg
- Area 88
- Armored Trooper Votoms
- Dirty Pair
- Dream Hunter Rem
- Fight! Iczer One
- Fire Tripper
- Genesis Climber MOSPEADA
- Justy (manga)
- Leda: The Fantastic Adventure of Yohko
- Little Memole
- Magical Princess Minky Momo
- Megazone 23
- Mugen Shinshi
- Mujigen Hunter Fandora
- Urusei Yatsura (film series)
- What's Michael?

=== 2020s ===
==== 2021 ====
- The Haunted House Special: The Vampire of Light and the Child of Darkness

==== 2023 ====
- The Haunted House Special: Joseon Exorcism Annals

== See also ==
- Lists of animated films
- Lists of animated television series
