= Angela Santomero =

American television producer (born 1968)

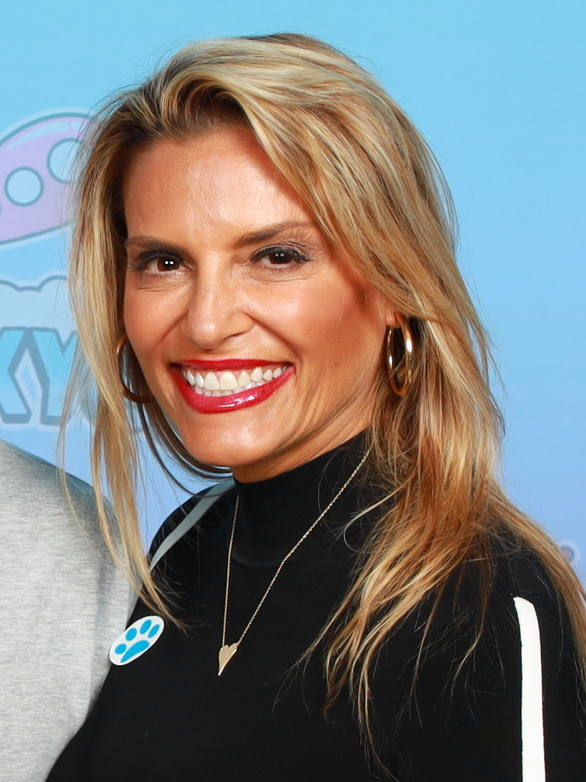
- Santomero at GalaxyCon Richmond in 2024
- Born: Angela Candace Santomero; April 26, 1968 (age 58); New York City, U.S.
- Occupation: Television producer
- Known for: Co-creator of Blue's Clues, creator of Super Why!, Daniel Tiger's Neighborhood, and Creative Galaxy
- Spouse: Greg Santomero
- Children: 2
- Website: www.angelasclues.com

Angela Candace Santomero (born April 26, 1968) is an American television producer and co-creator of the Nickelodeon children's television programs Blue's Clues, as well as its spin-off Blue's Room and reboot Blue's Clues & You!. She has also created the PBS children's shows Super Why!, & Daniel Tiger's Neighborhood, the Amazon series Creative Galaxy, Wishenpoof!, and the Netflix original series Charlie's Colorforms City. Santomero has won a Peabody Award, a 2012 Emmy Award for Daniel Tiger's Neighborhood, two Television Critics Association Awards, and the 2018 World Screen's Kids Trendsetter Award. She has been nominated for more than twenty-five Emmy Awards and numerous Parents' Choice Gold and Silver Awards.

== Early life and education ==
Santomero grew up in Harrington Park, New Jersey, where she attended Harrington Park Public School before attending and graduating from Northern Valley Regional High School at Old Tappan in 1986. She received her bachelor's degree from Catholic University, which later presented her with their Young Alumni Merit Award. She earned a master's degree in child development and psychology, with a specialty in instructional technology and media, from Columbia University. During graduate school, she was influenced by the research of Daniel R. Anderson, who studied the effects of television violence on children and later served as a researcher and consultant for Blue's Clues, and "became fascinated with the idea that if television could have a powerful negative effect on kids, it could have an equally powerful positive effect on them..." She was also influenced by Fred Rogers, host of Mister Rogers' Neighborhood and the researchers of Sesame Street.

== Career ==
Santomero worked as a researcher for Nickelodeon in the early 1990s, when the network was looking to create a new television show for preschoolers. In 1994, Santomero, along with director Todd Kessler and animator Traci Paige Johnson (a group that Nickelodeon executive Brown Johnson called a "green creative team"), created the "landmark" series Blue's Clues. According to writer Diane Tracy, Santomero, Kessler, and Johnson did not possess traditional backgrounds of most producers of children's programs, but "did possess an amazing combination of talents, backgrounds, and personal attributes." Santomero served as executive producer and head writer, and designed the show's research and curriculum. She also produced and developed other Blue's Clues projects, such as the full-length movie Blue's Big Musical Movie, educational CDs and books based on the show, two Blue's Clues theatrical productions, which toured across the U.S., and the reboot Blue's Clues & You!. She was also the founder of a company called Out of the Blue Enterprises which later was renamed to 9 Story USA. In 2007, Santomero created the PBS program Super Why!; she also served as executive producer and head writer.

In 2011, she became host of PBS's The Parent Show, an online series about parenting. In September 2012, Daniel Tiger's Neighborhood, for which Santomero is creator, executive producer and head writer, debuted on PBS. After Fred died in 2003, "Kevin Morrison (CEO-Fred Rogers Co.) reached out to Angela and asked what show she would do to honor Fred's legacy". Her idea was an animated version of Fred Rogers' Neighborhood of Make Believe. This was the birth of Daniel Tiger's Neighborhood.

On March 28, 2023, Angela C. Santomero left 9 Story Media Group as Chief Creative Officer, but she currently maintains her duties as the CEO of 9 Story USA.

She is also the creator and producer of the Amazon original series Creative Galaxy and Wishenpoof!, and the Netflix series Charlie's Colorforms City. Angela authored Preschool Clues - Raising Smart, Inspired and Engaged Kids in a Screen-Filled World (Touchstone 2018) with co-author Deborah Reber, and authored Radical Kindness - The Life-Changing Power of Giving and Receiving (HarperCollins Publishers 2019) with foreword by Deepak Chopra.

== Personal life ==
Santomero resides in Greenwich, Connecticut, with her husband Greg, an Emmy Award-winning designer/creative director, and their two daughters.

== Filmography ==
=== Television ===
Title	Role	First aired	Last aired	Co-production	Network
Blue's Clues	Co-creator	September 8, 1996	August 6, 2006	Out of the Blue Enterprises; Nickelodeon Animation Studio	Nick Jr.
Little Bill	Creative Director	November 28, 1999	February 6, 2004	Nickelodeon Animation Studio	Nick Jr.
Blue's Room	Co-creator	August 2, 2004	March 29, 2007	Out of the Blue Enterprises; Nickelodeon Animation Studio	Nick Jr.
Super Why!	Creator	September 3, 2007	May 12, 2016	Decode Entertainment (S1); DHX Studios Halifax (S2-S3); Out of the Blue Enterprises	PBS Kids
Daniel Tiger's Neighborhood	Creator	September 3, 2012	present	9 Story USA; Fred Rogers Productions	PBS Kids
Creative Galaxy	Creator	April 19, 2013	June 4, 2019	Amazon Studios; 9 Story Media Group; 9 Story USA	Amazon Video
Wishenpoof	Creator	February 5, 2014	May 9, 2019	Amazon Studios; DHX Studios Halifax; Out of the Blue Enterprises	Amazon Video
Charlie's Colorforms City	Creator	March 22, 2019	June 13, 2022	9 Story USA; DHX Studios Halifax/IoM Media Ventures	Netflix
Blue's Clues & You!	Co-creator	November 11, 2019	September 27, 2024	9 Story USA; Nickelodeon Animation Studio; Brown Bag Films	Nick Jr.
Hello Jack! The Kindness Show	Co-creator	November 5, 2021	October 7, 2022	9 Story USA; Brown Bag Films; Jax Media	Apple TV+
Rosie's Rules	Executive producer	October 3, 2022	present	9 Story Media Group; Brown Bag Films	PBS Kids (U.S.); TVOKids
Dee & Friends in Oz	Creator	February 5, 2024	February 5, 2024	9 Story Media Group; Brown Bag Films	Netflix

== Works cited ==
- Tracy, Diane. (2002). Blue's Clues for Success: The 8 Secrets Behind a Phenomenal Business. New York: Kaplan Publishing. ISBN 0-7931-5376-X.
