= Kathleen O'Rourke =

Kathleen O'Rourke may refer to:

• (The mother of child actress Heather O'Rourke)

- Kathy Kirby (born Kathleen O'Rourke, 1938–2011), English singer
- Kathy O'Rourke (Kathleen O'Rourke, born 1964), Canadian curler
- Kathleen O'Rourke, writer of 2008 animated film Granny O'Grimm's Sleeping Beauty
