= Colorforms =

Brand of toy (1951-present)

Colorforms Brand, LLC
- Formerly: Colorforms Inc. (1951-2014)
- Type: Brand
- Founded: 1951; 75 years ago
- Founder: Harry and Patricia Kislevitz
- Headquarters: United States
- Products: Toys
- Owner: Harry and Patricia Kislevitz (1951-1997); Toy Biz (1997-1998); University Games (1998-2014); Out of the Blue Enterprises (2014-2018); 9 Story Media Group (2018-present)

Colorforms is a creative toy named for the simple shapes and forms cut from colored vinyl sheeting that cling to a smooth backing surface without adhesives. These pieces are used to create picture graphics, designs, and play scenes which can then be changed countless times by repositioning the removable color forms. The name also refers to the specific registered trademark brand these products are produced under, as well as the company that manufactures the toys, Colorforms Brand, LLC.

Sets initially featured basic geometric shapes and bright primary colors on black or white backgrounds. The Colorforms line evolved to include full-color illustrated playsets, games and puzzles, interactive books, and creative activity sets for children of all ages. The licensing of media properties related to contemporary pop culture became integral to the product and company's success. Since its inception, more than a billion Colorforms playsets have been produced and sold.

== Design ==
Colorforms are sheet-thin, die-cut vinyl pieces in colorful geometric "forms" and abstract shapes (figurative or object), often with over-printed images that are to be attached to a smooth plastic-laminated paperboard background, much like placing paper dolls against a paper backdrop. The pieces stick to the background without chemical or static adhesion, and in a secure but non-permanent manner when a vacuum is created between the two polished surfaces, holding the piece in place. The Colorforms vinyl pieces can then be repositioned on the board a virtually unlimited number of times to create new designs and scenarios.

== History ==
The Colorforms concept was developed by Harry and Patricia Kislevitz in 1951, firmly rooted in the Modernist design ethos and reflecting the Color Field abstract style prevalent at the time.

The basic concept behind Colorforms is the ability to adhere and reposition abstract and geometric color form shapes on random surfaces to create art. Both recent art students, the couple discovered the idea when they acquired several rolls of flexible paper-thin colored vinyl used to manufacture plastic pocketbooks and found that it would stick to the glossy paint in their bathroom and allow them to reposition it at will without affecting either surface. Simply cutting shapes out of the material and sticking them to the wall turned out to be amusing enough that they left extra vinyl with a pair of scissors for guests to add to their creations. The positive reactions they got to the project led Harry to believe there was market potential for such a product.

The original Colorforms sets were spiral-bound booklets, hand-assembled by the husband-and-wife team in their New York City apartment. The first 1,000 sets were sold "on concept" to the FAO Schwarz toy store. Shallow boxed sets containing screen-printed, die-cut pieces, and illustrated backgrounds began appearing soon after. The company used the slogan "It's More Fun To Play The Colorforms Way!" in print ads and television commercials to promote their products. Prominent graphic designer, Paul Rand, was commissioned to create the company logo that remains in use today; he also gave input for a "signature-edition" playset.

The company rarely employed an in-house creative staff, relying instead on the Kislevitz' own artistic direction provided to top freelance illustrators for layouts and finished work. Indeed, even the company's creative director from 1965 until 1986, toy designer and inventor, Mel Birnkrant, was not a formal Colorforms employee, working instead for a royalty percentage.

The defining feature of most Colorforms playsets is their signature plastic "Stick-Ons" that can be placed and repositioned on top of graphic backgrounds to create endless scenes and scenarios at a child's whim.

== Company timeline ==
- 1951 - Harry and Patricia Kislevitz experiment with flexible vinyl sheeting material to decorate their apartment by cutting out shapes and affixing them to smooth surfaces; they realize that this could be applied to an activity toy set, thus beginning the Colorforms concept.
- 1957 - Popeye becomes Colorforms' first licensed character applied to its products.
- 1959 - Graphic designer Paul Rand creates the Colorforms logo.
- 1968 - The Outer Space Men carded action figures are released.
- 1962 - Miss Weather, a Colorforms character featuring a wardrobe that changed with the weather, makes her debut.
- 1981 - Colorforms acquires licensing rights to Shrinky Dinks kits; during its licensing period, Colorforms created and marketed more than 50 different Shrinky Dinks toy activity and creativity kits.
- 1997 - Toy Biz acquires Colorforms.
- 1998 - University Games acquires Toy Biz.
- 2000 - Colorforms listed among the Top 10 Toys of the Century by the Toy Industry of America (TIA).
- 2011 - Colorforms named one of the Top 100 Toys of All Time by Time magazine.
- 2014 - Out of the Blue Enterprises acquires Colorforms
- 2018 - 9 Story Media Group acquires Out of the Blue Enterprises

== Products ==
Original character sets focused on household themes such as Miss Weather, a girl whose wardrobe changed with the weather, and Miss Cookie's Kitchen, a woman with a variety of kitchen tools and utensils. Later sets relied on the use of licensed cartoon characters such as Mickey Mouse and Gumby. Colorforms products have expanded beyond the simple "paper doll" concept to more than 75 Colorforms toy products currently in distribution, with more added every year.

== Licensed characters ==
The first Colorforms product to utilize a licensed character property featured Popeye, the King Features Syndicate cartoon character, released as a boxed set in 1957. Since then, licensed products have remained important to the Colorforms marketing strategy, with hundreds of brands connected to Colorforms. Later, Colorforms licensed various properties, producing sets supporting varied cartoons, TV series, movie releases, and popular musical artists, like The Beatles, Peanuts, Gumby, Tarzan, The Three Stooges, Doctor Dolittle, Star Trek, Batman and Superman (along with a whole pantheon of comic-book superheroes), and Chitty Chitty Bang Bang, Michael Jackson, The Smurfs, and even Steve Urkel.

In a licensing twist, Colorforms developed their own character property, Sugar & Spice to compete with Strawberry Shortcake (1979) when master license holder, Kenner Products, would not allow wide usage of character rights throughout the toy industry. Colorforms sold their character concept to other companies that got shut out of the 'Shortcake' craze. Another property that Colorforms was never able to translate into their own form was the Star Wars franchise, again because Kenner held the toy products master license. Similarly, Colorforms licensed the Curley McDimple property from the Off-Broadway musical when Shirley Temple Black, the actress whom the McDimple parody was based on, refused to license her likeness to them.

== Other products ==
1968 saw an interesting diversion from the typical two-dimensional toy lines that Colorforms specialized in, when they released the Outer Space Men (a.k.a. Colorform Aliens) bendy action figures. This group of aliens, hailing from other planets in the Solar System, were designed to tie into the popularity of Mattel's Major Matt Mason astronaut line (1966); Colorforms nicely complemented the larger manufacturer's line due to Mattel's dearth of alien adversaries. Colorforms also offered a respectable "knockoff" of the Silly Putty concept—the pliable rubbery clay-like substance that picked up newspaper-ink images when pressed upon it, with Moon Putty and Monster Print Putty – the former packaged in a hard plastic moon container and the latter packed in a little plastic human skull for heightened "monster" effect.

The Colorforms company was the major licensee of the Plasticine brand of modeling clay in the United States from 1979 until at least 1984; Plasticine is a non-drying putty-like modeling material made from a proprietary mix of chalk and petroleum jelly. This provided Colorforms with a viable competitor to Kenner's Play-Doh.

Colorforms acquired the rights to license and distribute Shrinky Dinks in 1981, and continued creating and promoting their products until the brand was sold to Milton Bradley in 1988.

The company has also, at times, carried a wide range of children's board games, and both child-targeted and high-end jigsaw puzzles.

== Ownership changes (1997–present) ==
In 1997, Colorforms was acquired by Toy Biz. A year later, Colorforms was sold off to University Games Corporation. In September 2014, it became a new division of Out of the Blue Enterprises, as Colorforms Brand, LLC. In January 2018, Toronto-based 9 Story Media Group acquired Out of the Blue, also inheriting Colorforms. In 2019, both companies teamed up with DHX Media to make the children's television series Charlie's Colorforms City for Netflix.
