= Charlie's Colorforms City =

2019 animated children's series

- Created by: Angela C. Santomero
- Written by: Leah Gotcsik
- Directed by: Lindsay Allan; Jay Silver
- Creative director: Leah Gotcsik
- Voices of: Jacob Soley; Saara Chaudry; Tyler Barish; Zoe Hatz; Shomoy
- Theme music composer: CCC
- Opening theme: "Charlie's Colorforms City Theme"
- Ending theme: "Charlie's Colorforms City Theme"
- Countries of origin: United States; Canada
- Original language: English
- No. of seasons: 6
- No. of episodes: 34

Production
- Executive producer: Angela Santomero
- Producer: Colleen McGrath
- Production location: Canada
- Camera setup: Single-camera
- Running time: 23 minutes
- Production companies: 9 Story USA; DHX Studios Halifax/IoM Media Ventures

Original release
- Network: Netflix
- Release: March 22, 2019 – June 13, 2022

Charlie's Colorforms City is an animated children's television series created by Angela Santomero, based on Colorforms, and presented by Tyler Maxwell. The show educates children about colors, shapes, and size; the show is co-produced for Netflix by 9 Story USA and IoM Media Ventures (formerly DHX Studios Halifax). The series premiered on Netflix on March 22, 2019, with season 1 consisting of 13 episodes. Several new episodes (marketed as three additional seasons) were released on November 30, 2021. Another 11 episodes (marketed as 2 seasons) were released on June 13, 2022.

== American cast ==
- Jacob Soley - Charlie
- Saara Chaudry - Violet
- Tyler Barish - Red
- Caleb Bellavance - Red (Season 2)
- Zoe Hatz - Miss Weather
- Joseph Motiki - OctoBocto, An Athletic Silly Face, A Clumsy Silly Face
- Julie Lemieux - A Baby Silly Face, A Loud Silly Face, A Space Silly Face, Chicken
- Shoshana Sperling - A Grandma Silly Face, A Police Silly Face, A Woman Police Silly Face, Mermaid 2
- John Davie - Klunk
- Stacey DePass - Dragon, Brother Dragon, A Kid Silly Face
- Adrianna Di Liello - Star
- Bryn McAuley - Marina the Mermaid, A Yoga Instructor Silly Face
- Ethan Pugiotto - Harley
- Nissae Isen - Baby Elephant
- Deann DeGruijter - Rock Star Beach Ball Fish
- Bianca Alongi - MacGuffin
- Michela Luci - Yetilda
- Rick Miller - A Business Silly Face, A Construction Silly Face
- Wyatt White - Humpty

The series has also been dubbed into several other languages including British English, French and Polish.
