= 9 Story Media Group =

Canadian media company

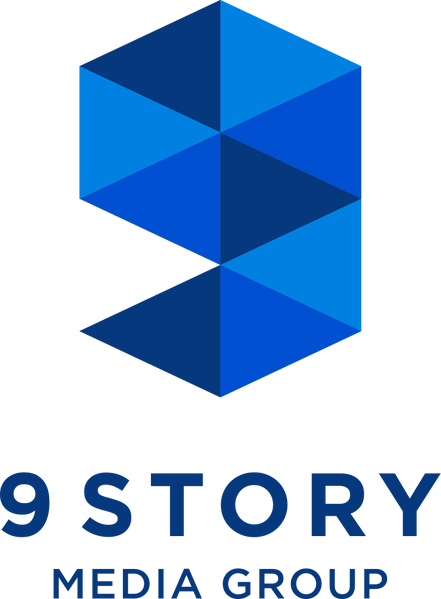
- Logo used since 2018
- Formerly: 9 Story Entertainment Inc. (2002–2014)
- Type: Subsidiary
- Industry: Media; Entertainment
- Predecessors: Out of the Blue Enterprises; Portfolio Entertainment
- Founded: September 2002; 24 years ago
- Founders: Vince Commisso; Steven Jarosz
- Headquarters: 23 Fraser Avenue, Toronto, Ontario, Canada
- Area served: Worldwide
- Key people: Vince Commisso (president, CEO)
- Number of employees: 1,100 (2019)
- Parent: Scholastic Corporation (2024–present)
- Divisions: 9 Story Brands; 9 Story Creative Affairs; 9 Story Distribution International; Brown Bag Films
- Subsidiaries: Colorforms
- Website: 9story.com

9 Story Media Group (formerly known as 9 Story Entertainment) is a Canadian media production, animation studio, and distribution company founded in September 2002 by Vince Commisso and Steven Jarosz.

== History ==
=== As 9 Story Entertainment ===
The company was founded in September 2002 as 9 Story Entertainment by Vince Commisso (an ex-Nelvana producer) and Steven Jarosz so Commisso would be able to work on Peep and the Big Wide World. On September 21, 2006, 9 Story launched an international distribution division headed by former Universal Studios executive, Natalie Osborne, known as 9 Story Enterprises.

9 Story produced its first live-action series, Survive This, from 2008 until 2010, but ran for two years. On September 20, 2011, 9 Story Entertainment became the co-producer and distributor of the animated series Arthur, replacing WildBrain's predecessor. 9 Story would produce the series from seasons 16 to 19. On April 8, 2013, 9 Story announced that it would acquire the kids & family distribution library of CCI Entertainment; the acquisition was completed on July 24.

=== As 9 Story Media Group ===
Logo used from 2014 to 2018

On October 10, 2014, 9 Story Entertainment changed its name to 9 Story Media Group with Neil Court and Zelnick Media Capital becoming majority owners of the company a few months prior. On August 18, 2015, 9 Story Media Group acquired the Dublin-based animation studio Brown Bag Films.

On October 6, 2015, 9 Story announced an agreement with U.S.-based toy manufacturer Mattel to relaunch/reboot Barney & Friends and Angelina Ballerina under license from HIT Entertainment for planned releases in 2017, but nothing was heard from them in terms of either production or release since then. On May 25, 2016, 9 Story acquired the global distribution rights to Garfield and Friends.

On October 21, 2016, 9 Story's distribution arm, 9 Story Enterprises, was rebranded as 9 Story Distribution International and moved operations from Toronto to Dublin. On October 15, 2017, 9 Story rebranded its Toronto 2D animation studio after Brown Bag Films, with the Ireland studio becoming 9 Story's production branch for both 2D and 3D animation across Dublin, Manchester, and Toronto. At the same time, Brown Bag Films became one of 9 Story's main divisions, alongside 9 Story Distribution International.

On January 12, 2018, 9 Story announced that they had acquired production company, Out of the Blue Enterprises, for an undisclosed amount and rebranded them to 9 Story USA. 9 Story also acquired the rights to the Colorforms brand as part of its purchase with its founder and CEO, Angela C. Santomero joining the company to run its New York offices prior to her promotion as chief creative officer for 9 Story on June 18th of that year. She would exit the company in 2022.. On May 13, 2018, 9 Story unveiled an updated logo and announced the launch of 9 Story Brands, a consumer products division.

On July 10, 2018, 9 Story acquired the kids & family distribution catalog and development slate of Breakthrough Entertainment. On February 4, 2019, 9 Story announced that they had acquired Bali-based animation studio BASE for an undisclosed amount, and rebranded it as Brown Bag Films. On April 1, 2019, 9 Story signed a deal with Scholastic to distribute its library, consisting of 230 half hours of programming, which would bring 9 Story's overall content library at the time to 4,000 half hours of programming. In 2022, Commisso and John Galway won the Academy of Canadian Cinema & Television's Board of Directors Tribute Award at the 10th Canadian Screen Awards.

On February 5, 2024, 9 Story acquired the assets of Portfolio Entertainment, another company in Toronto, including its distribution catalogue, development slates, and production. Portfolio co-founder and CEO Lisa Olfman became an executive producer at 9 Story, where she will report to Commisso. On March 12, 2024, Scholastic announced that they would acquire complete economic interest and minority voting rights in 9 Story for $186 million; the transaction closed on June 21, 2024.

== Original productions ==
=== Original series ===
| Title | Creator(s) / Developer(s) | Year(s) of airtime | Production partner(s) / Co-production(s) | Network | Notes |
|---|---|---|---|---|---|
| Peep and the Big Wide World | Kaj Pindal | 2004–07, 2010–11 | WGBH Boston; Eggbox LLC; National Film Board of Canada; Discovery Kids Original Productions | TVOKids (Canada); Discovery Kids/TLC (seasons 1–3); Public television syndication (seasons 4–5) (U.S.) | Owned by WGBH Educational Foundation |
| If the World Were a Village | | 2005 | | YTV (Canada) | |
| Jacob Two-Two (season 5) | Jacob Two-Two by Mordecai Richler | 2005–06 | Nelvana | YTV (Canada) | Owned by Nelvana |
| Skyland | Emmanuel Gorinstein; Alexandre de La Patellière; Mathieu Delaporte | 2005–07 | Method Films | France 2 (France); Teletoon (Canada) | |
| Postcards from Buster (seasons 2–3) | Marc Brown (original characters); Natatcha Estébanez | 2006–12 | Marc Brown Studios; WGBH Boston; Cookie Jar Entertainment | PBS Kids Go! | Owned by WGBH Educational Foundation |
| Max & Ruby (seasons 3–5) | Rosemary Wells | 2007–13 | Nelvana | Nick Jr. (U.S.); Treehouse TV (Canada) | Owned by Nelvana |
| Futz! | Vadim Kapridov | 2007–08 | | Teletoon (Canada) | |
| Best Ed | Rick Marshall (d): J.D. Smith | 2008–09 | | Teletoon (Canada); Cartoon Network (Europe) | |
| Survive This | Les Stroud | 2009–10 | | YTV (Canada) | |
| Wibbly Pig | Wibbly Pig series by Mick Inkpen | 2009–10 | Wish Films | CBeebies (Europe); TVOKids/Knowledge Kids (Canada) | |
| Spliced | Simon Racioppa; Richard Elliott | 2009–10 | Nelvana | Teletoon (Canada) | animation only |
| Pound Puppies (season 1, episodes 1–7) | David Sacks (d): Wendy Moss Klein; Nancy Steingard; Paul Germain; Joe Ansolabehere | 2010 | Hasbro Studios | The Hub/Hub Network | Owned by Hasbro Entertainment |
| Wild Kratts | Chris Kratt; Martin Kratt | 2011–present | Kratt Brothers Company | TVOKids/Knowledge Network (Canada); PBS Kids (U.S.) | |
| Almost Naked Animals | Noah Z. Jones (d): Doug Hadders; Adam Rotstein | 2011–13 | | YTV (Canada) | |
| Daniel Tiger's Neighborhood | Angela C. Santomero | 2012–present | 9 Story USA; Fred Rogers Productions | PBS Kids (U.S.); CBC Kids (Canada) | |
| Fugget About It | Nicholas Tabarrok; Willem Wennekers (d): Jeff Abugov | 2012–16 (original); 2024–25 (shorts) | Darius Films | Teletoon at Night (seasons 1–2); Adult Swim (season 3); YouTube (shorts) | First adult animated television series produced by the company. |
| Arthur (seasons 16–19) | Marc Brown (original characters) (d): Kathy Waugh; Marc Brown | 2012–16 | WGBH Boston | PBS Kids (U.S.); CBC Kids (Canada) | Owned by WGBH Educational Foundation |
| Cache Craze | | 2013–14 | | YTV (Canada) | |
| Creative Galaxy | Angela C. Santomero | 2013–19 | 9 Story USA; Amazon Studios | Amazon Video | |
| Camp Lakebottom | Eric Jacobson; Betsy McGowen (d): Meghan Davies; Shelley Hoffman; Robert Pincombe | 2013–17 | Skywriter Media; Jam Filled Entertainment (season 1) | Teletoon (Canada); Disney XD (U.S.) | |
| Peg + Cat | Jennifer Oxley; Billy Aronson | 2013–18 | 9 Ate 7 Productions; Fred Rogers Productions | PBS Kids (United States); Treehouse TV (Canada) | |
| Numb Chucks | Phil LaFrance; Jamie LeClaire | 2014–16 | Jam Filled Entertainment | YTV (Canada) | |
| Get Ace | D.J. McPherson; Jack Christian | 2014 | Galaxy Pop; Filmology Finance | Eleven (Australia) | distribution only |
| Nerds and Monsters | Josh Mepham; Kathy Antonsen Rocchio; Greg Sullivan; Vito Viscomi | 2014–16 | Slap Happy Cartoons Inc. | YTV (Canada) | |
| The Stanley Dynamic | Ken Cuperus | 2015–17 | Amaze Film + Television; Nelvana | YTV (Canada) | animation only |
| Nature Cat (seasons 1–3) | Adam Rudman; David Rudman; Todd Hannert | 2015–21 | Spiffy Pictures; WTTW Chicago | PBS Kids (U.S.) | |
| 3 Amigonauts | Kyle Marshall (d): Laurie Elliott; Terry McGurrin | 2017 | Corus Entertainment | YTV (Canada) | |
| Furze World Wonders | Jeff Copeland; Stephen Sloot | 2017 | | YouTube Red | |
| The Magic School Bus Rides Again | The Magic School Bus by Joanna Cole; Bruce Degen | 2017–20 | Scholastic Media | Netflix | |
| Top Wing | Matthew Fernandes (d): Scott Kraft | 2017–20 | Industrial Brothers | Treehouse TV (Canada) | |
| Let's Go Luna! | Joe Murray | 2018–22 | Brown Bag Films | PBS Kids (U.S.); TVOKids (Canada) | |
| Xavier Riddle and the Secret Museum | Ordinary People Change the World by Brad Meltzer | 2019–26 | Brown Bag Films | PBS Kids (U.S.) | |
| Blue's Clues & You! | Traci Paige Johnson; Todd Kessler; Angela C. Santomero (d): Traci Paige Johnson; Angela C. Santomero | 2019–24 | Brown Bag Films; Nickelodeon Animation Studio | Treehouse TV (Canada); Nickelodeon (U.S.)(seasons 1–4a); Nick Jr. (U.S.)(season 4b); YouTube (season 5) | Owned by Skydance Corporation |
| Clifford the Big Red Dog (2019) | Clifford the Big Red Dog by Deborah Forte Clifford the Big Red Dog by Norman Bridwell | 2019–21 | 100 Chickens Productions; Brown Bag Films; Scholastic Media; Amazon Studios | Amazon Prime Video; PBS Kids | |
| Get Rolling with Otis | | 2021 | Brown Bag Films | Apple TV+ | |
| Hello, Jack! The Kindness Show | Jack McBrayer; Angela C. Santomero | 2021–22 | Jax Media; Brown Bag Films | Apple TV+ | |
| Karma's World | Chris Bridges (d): Wendy Harris; Rachel Kalban; Jennie Stacey | 2021–22 | Karma's World Entertainment; Brown Bag Films; Netflix Animation Studios | Netflix | |
| Rosie's Rules | Jennifer Hamburg (d): Karen Fowler | 2022–present | Brown Bag Films | PBS Kids (U.S.); TVOKids (Canada) | |
| Lu & the Bally Bunch | Nicky Phelan (d): Sarah Lonsdale; Jennie Stacey | 2023 | Brown Bag Films; Bhean Productions Limited | Cartoonito; CBC Kids (Canada) | |
| Open Season: Call of Nature | Open Season by Steve Moore; John B. Carls; Jill Culton; Anthony Stacchi (d): Jennie Stacey; Kent Redecker | 2023–26 | Sony Pictures Animation; Brown Bag Films Toronto | Family Channel (Canada) | Owned by Sony Pictures |
| Dee & Friends in Oz | The Wonderful Wizard of Oz (d): Keion Jackson; Halcyon Person | 2024 | Brown Bag Films | Netflix | |
| Breaking Bear | Julien Nitzberg | 2026–present | Evoke Entertainment; Portfolio Entertainment; To The Stars | Tubi | Second adult animated television series produced by the company; uncredited |
| Super Why's Comic Book Adventures | Angela C. Santomero; Alex Breen; Sarah Wallendjack | 2026–present | Brown Bag Films | PBS Kids | |
Upcoming
| Clifford the Big Red Dog (2027) | | 2027 | Scholastic Entertainment; Brown Bag Films | PBS Kids | |
| Dragon Girls | | TBA | Scholastic Entertainment; Brown Bag Films | | |

=== Feature films and specials ===
| Title | Release date | Network(s) / Distributor | Notes |
|---|---|---|---|
| Harriet the Spy: Blog Wars | March 19, 2010 | Movie Central/The Movie Network (Canada); Disney Channel (U.S.) | |
| Angela's Christmas | November 30, 2018 | Netflix | co-production with Brown Bag Films |
| Angela's Christmas Wish | December 1, 2020 | Netflix | co-production with Brown Bag Films |
| Blue's Big City Adventure | November 18, 2022 | Paramount+ | co-production with Nickelodeon Movies, Nickelodeon Animation Studio, Brown Bag Films, Boxel Animation and Line by Line Media |
