= Deer in the Headlights (card game) =

- Card Game
- Designer: Front Porch Classics
- Publisher: University Games
- Players: 2+
- Skills: Math
- Age range: 8+
- Rank (high→low): 2 - 10

Deer in the Headlights is a card game published by University Games involving two or more players aged eight and up. The object of the game is to be the first player to discard their hand of cards in each round to tally the fewest points and win the game.

== Setup ==
Each game comes with two decks of custom cards, three wooden dice, scorecards, and an instruction manual. Each die includes a mix of standard numbers and specialized characters. The characters account for “special rolls” and are shown as a car, a running deer, or a deer in headlights. All three dice are used during the game.

The number of the decks dealt out is up to the players. For instance, two players may choose to only deal out one deck, if so all of the cards in a deck must be dealt out; dealing out two decks of cards will result in a longer game depending on the number of players involved. Jokers are discarded from the deck.

== Gameplay ==
Players take turns tossing the dice, starting with the dealer. Players may then play cards based on their rolls. For instance, if a player rolls two numbers and one car, they may only play cards corresponding to the numbers they rolled.

The object of the game is to be the first player to discard all of the cards in their hand to end the round. Once a round has finished, the rest of the players count their scores by adding up the total value of the remaining cards in their hand. Each player's score is recorded on the scorecard; the score of the round is recorded in the upper box and the cumulative score is tallied in the lower box. All cards are added by their associated value. Aces are worth one point. Jacks, Queens, and Kings are all worth ten points each.

The game is concluded with the first player to reach 150 points – this player loses the game. The winner of the game is the player who has tallied the fewest points by the game's end.
