= Dee & Friends in Oz =

2024 animated TV series

- Genre: Fantasy; Adventure; Musical; Comedy
- Created by: Angela C. Santomero
- Based on: The Wonderful Wizard of Oz
- Developed by: Keion Jackson; Halcyon Person
- Directed by: Declan Doyle; Dan Nosella
- Voices of: LaChanze; Tarriona "Tank" Ball; James Monroe Iglehart
- Music by: Tarriona "Tank" Ball
- Composer: A.J. Sealy
- Countries of origin: United States; Canada; Ireland
- Original language: English
- No. of seasons: 2
- No. of episodes: 17

Production
- Executive producers: Vince Commisso; Cathal Gaffney; Darragh O'Connell; Angela C. Santomero
- Producers: Fatimah Abdullah; Rory Dungan; Michael Pecoriello
- Running time: 22 minutes
- Production companies: 9 Story Media Group; Brown Bag Films

Original release
- Network: Netflix
- Release: February 5, 2024

Dee & Friends in Oz is an animated fantasy adventure musical television series re-telling the classic story of The Wonderful Wizard of Oz. It released globally on Netflix on February 5, 2024.

Produced by 9 Story Media Group and Brown Bag Films, animated by the same team who worked on Karma's World and Ada Twist, Scientist, the series is inspired by the L. Frank Baum 1900 children’s fantasy novel and has been adapted in a series format for a preschool audience for the first-time.

== Premise ==
The series follows the story of a young girl named Dee, who uses a mysterious key to discover a magical land of Oz, where she meets new friends and gets challenged on a musical journey to save magic - and become a hero.

== Characters ==
=== Main ===
- Dorothy "Dee" Davis (Layla Capers): The series' main 8-year-old (starting at 7 years old) female protagonist.
- Miss Emerald (LaChanze): The teacher at The School of Oz. She's Miss Ruby's good sister.
- Stuffley (James Monroe Inglehart): The main villain's right-hand-bear turned hero and supporting character by the end of Season 1 and the beginning of Season 2.
- Tin/Quentin (Judah Edwards): A 7-year-old boy who is kind-hearted and loyal.
- Scarecrow/Skylar (Sevien Desuyo): A 7-year-old scarecrow who's really not scary at all.
- Lion/Rohan (Sid Kamat): A 5-year-old lion who's always ready to hang with the big kids.
- Eastyn/Emília (Isabella Velasquez): An 8-year-old pink witch who's always on the go and twin sister of Westyn/Wanessa.
- Westyn/Wanessa (Lumi Pollack): An 8-year-old blue witch and twin sister of Eastyn/Emília.

=== Villains ===
- Miss Ruby (Tarriona "Tank" Ball): The series main villain. She's Miss Emerald's evil sister.
- Larry the Shrink Bug (Ravi Cabot-Conyers)

=== Supporting ===
- Grandma (LaChanze): The grandmother of Dee.
- Dee's Dad (Antoine L. Smith): The father of Dee.
- Dee's Mom (Kaitlin Becker): The mother of Dee.
- Ozzo (Matt Densky): An Ozling in the magical land of Oz.
- Ozzie (Rodney Saulsberry): An Ozling in the magical land of Oz.
- Ozelle (Olivia Sarafina Washington): An Ozling in the magical land of Oz.
- Whoop-Dee-Doo (Jim Conroy): Stuffley's assistant.
- Whoop-Dee-Don't (Jim Conroy): Miss Ruby's assistant.
- Nonny Haybert (Kay Eluvian and Christine Rose Schermerhorn): A non-binary scarecrow and the mayor of Strawland.
- Mayor Gadget (Matt Densky): A male tinperson and the mayor of Tinland.
- Bluebell (Lena Josephine Marano)
- Lavender (Stephanie Sheh)
- Baby Woohoo Bird (Ravi Cabot-Conyers)
- The Singling (Damian Thompson)
- Thwart Funigans (Benjie Randall)

=== Minor ===
- Strawperson (Olivia Sarafina Washington)
- Strawperson (Tarriona 'Tank' Ball)
- Tinperson (Kaitlin Becker)
- Tinperson (Tarriona 'Tank' Ball)
- Little Ozling (Lena Josephine Marano)
- Little Ozling 2 (Lena Josephine Marano)
- Oz Creatures (Olivia Sarafina Washington)
- Ozica (Olivia Sarafina Washington)
- Sleepy Tree (Olivia Sarafina Washington)
- Ozling Parent (Olivia Sarafina Washington)
- Singing Ozling (Rodney Saulsberry)
- Singing Ozling (Olivia Sarafina Washington)
- Golden Woohoo Bird (Olivia Sarafina Washington)
- Woohoo Birds (Jim Conroy)
- Ozlie (Jim Conroy)
- Wiggly Frog (Jim Conroy)
- Giggly Frog (Jim Conroy)
- Boat (Matt Densky)
- Grumpy Ozling (Matt Densky)
- Sleepy Tree (Matt Densky)
- Witch (Antoine L. Smith)
- Rozzo (Matt Densky)
- Baby Ozling (Matt Densky)
- Ozling Chorus Member (Matt Densky)
- Ozward (Matt Densky)
- Lilac (Stephanie Sheh)
- Widget (Matt Densky)

== Episodes ==
=== Series overview ===
The series is split into two parts: Part 1 (The Prequel) and Part 2 (The Series).

| Season | Episodes | Originally released |
|---|---|---|
| Prequel | 1 | February 5, 2024 |
| 1 | 16 | February 5, 2024 |

=== Part 1/Prequel (2024) ===
| No. overall | No. in season | Title | Directed by | Written by | Original release date |
|---|---|---|---|---|---|
| 1 | 1 | "The Movie" | Declan Doyle | Halcyon Person & Keion Jackson | February 5, 2024 |
Dee goes to Grandma's house for the summer. While there, she finds a portal to the magical world of Oz and goes on an adventure to save magic - and rewrite the story of Oz with herself as the hero.

=== Part 2/Series (2024) ===
| No. overall | No. in season | Title | Directed by | Written by | Original release date |
|---|---|---|---|---|---|
| 2 | 1 | "Dee and the Wonderful School of Oz" | Aidan McAteer | Angela C. Santomero | February 5, 2024 |
Dee returns to Oz after the prequel and starts her first day at the School of Oz. While there she meets new friends and tries to be the hero when a problem bubbles up in Witch Village.
| 3 | 2 | "Dee and the Ozling Rescue" | Ray Quigley | Jehan Madhani | February 5, 2024 |
Dee helps a baby Ozling in trouble and goes on adventure with Lion to find the Ozling's beloved Lovey.
| 4 | 3 | "Dee and the Magical Gemstone" | Ray Quigley | Keion Jackson | February 5, 2024 |
Dee discovers a magical gemstone and works with her friends to protect the gems from the villainous Stuffley.
| 5 | 4 | "Dee and the Ozberry Adventure" | Ray Quigley | Nicky Phelan | February 5, 2024 |
Dee and Tin visit Scarecrow's home of Strawland for the Ozberry Feast and help Scarecrow protect the ozberry field.
| 6 | 5 | "Dee and the Banana Gemstone" | Aidan McAteer | Caitlin Hodson | February 5, 2024 |
Dee brings Grandma's banana pudding to share with her friends in Oz. They find a yellow gemstone, but it's stolen by the villainous Stuffley while they compete over who should protect it.
| 7 | 6 | "Dee and the Do-Your-Best-Fest" | Aidan McAteer | Keion Jackson | February 5, 2024 |
Dee and her friends start practicing for the "Do-Your-Best-Fest" in Oz. Dee and Tin worry that they may not be successful.
| 8 | 7 | "Dee and the Cloud Gemstone" | Ray Quigley | Jehan Madhani | February 5, 2024 |
Dee gets separated from her friends while riding the Cloud Tower and has to work together with the villainous Stuffley to find her way back.
| 9 | 8 | "Dee and the Heart Gemstone" | Aidan McAteer | Halcyon Person | February 5, 2024 |
Dee and her friends go on a journey to find the final gemstone that will fix the Gemstone Loop and reconnect Oz.
| 10 | 9 | "Dee and the Crown of Oz" | Ray Quigley | Angela C. Santomero | February 5, 2024 |
Dee and her friends visit Ozling city to help the Ozlings. Miss Ruby searches for the first piece of the Crown of Oz.
| 11 | 10 | "Dee and the Trouble in Tinland" | Ray Quigley | Kerry Crowley | February 5, 2024 |
Dee and Tin help repair the Tinland Clocktower and put a wrench in Miss Ruby's plans to tear the tower apart.
| 12 | 11 | "Dee and the Giant Ozlings" | Aidan McAteer | Jehan Madhani | February 5, 2024 |
Dee and Eastyn help wrangle three Giant Baby Ozlings who escaped the Ozling daycare.
| 13 | 12 | "Dee and the Shrink Bug" | Aidan McAteer | Halcyon Person | February 5, 2024 |
Dee and her friends find a lost Wooho Bird egg and help return it to its nest.
| 14 | 13 | "Dee, Tin and the Golden Ozberry" | Ray Quigley | Keion Jackson | February 5, 2024 |
Dee and her friends go on an adventure to reach the only golden ozberry bush discovered in Oz.
| 15 | 14 | "Dee and the Magic Balloon" | Aidan McAteer | Kerry Crowley | February 5, 2024 |
It's Oz-tastic Day in Oz. Dee and Lion learn to accept all feelings in order to save the holiday for their friends.
| 16 | 15 | "Dee and the Oz Emergencies" | Ray Quigley | Jehan Madhani | February 5, 2024 |
Dee and her friends try to clean up the messes caused by Miss Ruby. Miss Emerald teaches Dee how to take a break.
| 17 | 16 | "Dee and the Wizard of Oz" | Aidan McAteer | Halcyon Person | February 5, 2024 |
Dee and her friends race to find the final Wizard of Oz crown piece before Miss Ruby does.

== Production ==
The series is produced by 9 Story Media Group and Brown Bag Films. Vince Commisso, Cathal Gaffney, Darragh O'Connell and Angela C. Santomero, Halcyon Person and Keion Jackson are co-executive producers for the series, while Fatimah Abdullah, Rory Dungan and Michael Pecoriello are producers. The series is directed by Declan Doyle and Dan Nosella.

On September 28, 2023, Netflix announced the greenlight of the series, alongside an order for additional episodes of Gabby's Dollhouse and a trailer for its first CoComelon original series. The vice president of Netflix animation series, John Derderian, stated the series offers an exciting, character-forward way into a new social emotional curriculum through public domain characters like The Wizard of Oz that parents and kids are familiar with.

The official trailer for the series was released on January 11, 2024.

The show's first and second seasons premiered on Netflix on February 5, 2024. All 16 episodes premiered on the same day, alongside a 44-minute prequel and released globally on Netflix.

== Music ==
The show's original music is composed by Tarriona "Tank" Ball and inspired by music genres like R&B, hip-hop, funk, gospel, country, rock and more. The lyrics include affirmations about community, confidence and friendship. The show's first official soundtrack, Dee's Journey, was released globally on February 9 on all music streaming platforms, with the lead single "Proud to be Loud".

== Reception ==
The series has been received positively. Fernanda Camargo of Common Sense Media described the series as a "vibrant musical", saying that it "encourages kids to be their best selves" and brings a fresh take on familiar characters from the world of The Wizard of Oz. Herman also argued that the music in the series is "catchy with pop energy and lyrics that stay with you" and said that it uses song and dance to "inspire creative expression" calling it an enticing show providing good fun "for the entire family".
