= The Naughty Naughty Pets =

Canadian animated children's television series

- Genre: Children
- Based on: The Naughty Naughty Pets by Wendy Ann Gardner
- Composer: Eggplant Music
- Country of origin: Canada
- Original language: English
- No. of episodes: 26

Production
- Executive producers: Steven DeNure; Neil Court; Wendy Ann Gardner
- Producers: Kim Hyde; Beth Stevenson
- Animator: C.O.R.E. Digital Pictures
- Running time: 3 minutes
- Production company: Decode Entertainment (Note: As DECODE/Shorts Productions Inc.)

Original release
- Network: CBC
- Release: February 6 – May 17, 2006

The Naughty Naughty Pets is a Canadian animated children's TV series of shorts produced by Decode Entertainment with animation production by C.O.R.E. This show is based on a series of children's books by Wendy Ann Gardner.

The series premiered on CBC Television in 2006. Both the books and the animated show star a girl named Windywoo (voiced by Alyson Court) and her group of mischievous pets.

== Cast ==
- Alyson Court as Windywoo (Note: Uncredited)
- Andrew Pifko as Henry / Jacques / Kiefer
- Robert Smith as Handsome Hook / French Bulldog / Heedley / Ivan / Artie / Marty / Sir Leo / Kiwi
- Julie Lemieux as Vicky / Daisy

== Episodes ==
| No. | Title | Directed by | Written by | Original release date |
|---|---|---|---|---|
| 1 | "Sock It to Me" | Ben Pinkney | Dennis Heaton | February 6, 2006 |
Henry falls in love with Windywoo's socks and attempts to steal them.
| 2 | "Too Much of a Good Thing" | Ben Pinkney | Dennis Heaton | February 13, 2006 |
Windywoo thinks that having Mitchell is harmless, but little does she know that Mitchell is starting to duplicate, somehow!
| 3 | "Cat Town" | Ben Pinkney | Dennis Heaton | February 20, 2006 |
Handsome Hook turns Windywoo's apartment into a skating park.
| 4 | "The Dog Who Cried Wolf" | Ben Pinkney | Dennis Heaton | February 27, 2006 |
Jacques is desperate to get into a tin of food, so when Wendy-Woo goes out to the door, he gets what he wants - but not what he thought was in the tin.
| 5 | "This Time It's Personal" | Aaron Linton | Dennis Heaton | December 28, 2006 |
Vicious picks a fight on a firn.
| 6 | "Shopping Spree" | Ben Pinkney | Dennis Heaton | June 5, 2006 |
Vicky becomes so obsessed with the shopping channel on television that she begins to buy everything!
| 7 | "Heedley Pecked Me in the Eye" | Ben Pinkney | Dennis Heaton | June 12, 2006 |
Heedley finds every way possible to poke Windywoo's eye.
| 8 | "A Friend Indeed" | Aaron Linton | Dennis Heaton | June 19, 2006 |
Jacques blames Kiefer for inviting the pets over to Kiefer's house for a party.
| 9 | "Shovel, Shovel, Who's Got the Shovel?" | Unknown | Dennis Heaton | June 26, 2006 |
Ivan's beloved shovel has gone missing and he suspects that Windywoo took it.
| 10 | "Special Delivery" | Unknown | Dennis Heaton | August 3, 2006 |
Jacques tries to impress Daisy for her birthday, not that Kiefer makes it easy.
| 11 | "I Swear to Tell the Whole Truth!" | Ben Pinkney | Dennis Heaton | August 10, 2006 |
When the pets suddenly start swearing, Windywoo wonders who started it and where they got the words.
| 12 | "Cone of Silence" | Ben Pinkney | Dennis Heaton | August 17, 2006 |
Jacques makes fun of Sir Leo Licks A Lot's recovery cone.
| 13 | "Broadway Bound and Gagged" | Ben Pinkney | Dennis Heaton | August 24, 2006 |
Windywoo stages a Broadway-style musical for Killer Kiwi.
| 14 | "Flee the Flea" | Ben Pinkney | Dennis Heaton | August 31, 2006 |
The pets fear for their life when Windywoo brings out their worst enemy... Flea Powder!
| 15 | "Ivan Digs Hamlet" | Ben Pinkney | Dennis Heaton | March 1, 2006 |
Ivan recites a Hamlet monologue to a human skull.
| 16 | "Once a Pong a Time" | Ben Pinkney | Dennis Heaton | March 8, 2006 |
Vicious gets addicted to video games, and it's not long until Windywoo does, too.
| 17 | "Best Laid Plans" | Ben Pinkney | Dennis Heaton | March 15, 2006 |
Marty and Artie get into mischief of out-pranking each other.
| 18 | "Pets Playing Poker" | Vamberto Maduro | Dennis Heaton | March 22, 2006 |
Ivan and the other pets play a game of poker.
| 19 | "Your Call is Important to Us" | Vamberto Maduro | Dennis Heaton | March 29, 2006 |
Jacques pranks Daisy to impress her, until an accidental dial backfires.
| 20 | "Surprise Package" | Vamberto Maduro | Dennis Heaton | April 5, 2006 |
Vicious is impatient to unwrap his Christmas present.
| 21 | "Land of the Lost Socks" | Ben Pinkney | Dennis Heaton | April 12, 2006 |
Henry finds himself in a pile of socks through the dryer.
| 22 | "Butter Dish Investigation" | Ben Pinkney | Dennis Heaton | April 19, 2006 |
Windywoo suspects who has been licking the butter.
| 23 | "Magical Misery Tour" | Ben Pinkney | Dennis Heaton | April 26, 2006 |
Killer Kiwi tries out some magic tricks, and attempts to make Wendywoo disappear.
| 24 | "Clean Encounters" | Ben Pinkney | Dennis Heaton | May 3, 2006 |
A case of crown polishing sees Vicky being abducted into outer space.
| 25 | "Up, Up and Away" | Ben Pinkney | Dennis Heaton | May 10, 2006 |
Jacques and Leo have fun by inhaling helium.
| 26 | "Size Matters" | Ben Pinkney | Dennis Heaton | May 17, 2006 |
Artie attempts to steal Windywoo's crispy sweet, despite his size.

== Broadcast ==
The series originally ran on CBC Television in Canada between February 6 and May 17, 2006. The Naughty Naughty Pets was part of a bid by the broadcaster to target older youth audiences in its children's programming along with other new series such as Yam Roll, The Morgan Waters Show and Mr. Meaty. The channel initially skipped the show's seventh episode, "Heedley Pecked Me In The Eye", in their first run through the show for unstated reasons. It later aired on June 12, 2006.

Internationally, The Naughty Naughty Pets has aired on Canal Once in Mexico, NHK in Japan, Kids Central in Singapore, CITV in the UK and ABC in Australia

In the US, it aired on Cartoon Network and Boomerang during 2006 and 2007.
