= John Galway =

Canadian film producer

John Galway is a Canadian film and television executive, most noted as a former president of Astral Media's Harold Greenberg Fund for project development. Prior to joining the Harold Greenberg Fund, he worked for organizations such as Telefilm Canada, the Canadian Television Fund and the Ontario Film Development Corporation.

He has also been a cofounder of various film and television festivals, including the Toronto Irish Film Festival and the Canadian International Television Festival.

In 2019 he launched his own production firm, Corrib Entertainment.

In 2022, he was named alongside Vince Commisso as a winner of the Academy of Canadian Cinema and Television's Board of Directors Tribute Award at the 10th Canadian Screen Awards.
