= Creative Galaxy =

American-Canadian children's animated TV series

- Genre: Preschool; Science fiction
- Created by: Angela C. Santomero
- Directed by: Larry Jacobs (season 1); Lynn Reist (season 2); Jennifer Sherman (season 3)
- Voices of: Christian Distefano; Meesha Contreras; Samantha Bee; Helen King; Kallan Holley; Devan Cohen; Amariah Faulkner; Lilly Bartlam; Cloris Leachman; Jason Jones; John Palmier
- Composers: Brian Pickett; James Chapple; Greame Cornies; David Kelly
- Countries of origin: United States; Canada
- Original language: English
- No. of seasons: 3
- No. of episodes: 36 (68 segments)

Production
- Executive producers: Angela C. Santomero; Samantha Freeman Alpert; Vince Commisso; Wendy Harris; Steve Jaorsz; Alice Wilder
- Producers: Shevaun Gray; Amanda Smith-Kolic; Marcy Gunther
- Running time: 27–34 minutes
- Production companies: 9 Story USA; 9 Story Media Group; Amazon Studios

Original release
- Network: Amazon Video
- Release: April 15, 2013 – June 13, 2019

Creative Galaxy is a children's animated science-fiction television series that premiered on Amazon Video on April 15, 2013, and ended on June 13, 2019.

== Production ==
In February 2015, it was renewed for a second season that premiered on September 12, 2016. The series has a holiday special called Creative Galaxy: Arty's Holiday Masterpiece, which was released on November 19, 2018. The third season was released on June 3, 2019.

== Characters ==
- Arty (voiced by Christian Distefano (season 1); Meesha Contreras (seasons 2–3) is a boy alien who explores the Creative Galaxy in his Creative Spark rocket ship. There, he collects ideas and makes a final project out of art to help out.
- Arty's Mom (voiced by Samantha Bee (seasons 1-2); Helen King (season 3) is Arty's fun-loving mother.
- Arty's Dad (voiced by Jason Jones (seasons 1-2); John Palmier (season 3) is Arty's fun-loving father.
- Epiphany (voiced by Kira Gelineau) is Arty's sidekick. She can transform into different things magically.
- Annie (voiced by Amariah Faulkner (seasons 1–2); Lilly Bartlam (season 3) is a girl alien with a friendly, excitable and happy personality. She is a very good friend of Arty's.
- Juju (voiced by Kallan Holley) is a friendly girl alien who likes taking pictures with her camera. She is another good friend of Arty's.
- Jackson (voiced by Devan Cohen) is a boy alien with a very fun-loving personality. He is friends with Arty as well.
- Pablo (voiced by Brad Adamson) is the artist on the Painting Planet.
- Builder Ben & Builder Betty (voiced by Cory Doran & Jennifer Walls) are two builders on the Building Planet.
- Fabiana (voiced by Tricia Brioux (season 1); Shoshana Sperling (seasons 2–3) is a fashion model on the Fabric Planet.
- Seraphina (voiced by Brooke Shields) is a sculptor on the Sculpting Planet.
- Captain Paper (voiced by Scott McCord) is a superhero on the Paper Planet.
- Sketch (voiced by Jason Priestley) is a creator on the Drawing Planet.
- Melody (voiced by Lisa Loeb) is a dancer on the Music Planet.
- Galleria (voiced by Cloris Leachman) is the curator of the Museum Planet.
- Chef Zesty (voiced by Donovan Patton) is the chef on the Cooking Planet.

== Planets ==
- Museo, the Museum Planet - Its Curator is Galleria, The planet's name is a reference to Museo del Prado.
- Buildora, the Building Planet - Its helpful Builders are Builder Ben & Builder Betty, The planet's name is a portmanteau of Build and Pandora.
- Fabrictopia, the Fabric Planet - Its Fashion Model is Fabiana, The planet's name is a portmanteau of Fabric and Utopia.
- Paintoria, the Painting Planet - Its Artist is Pablo, The planet's name is a portmanteau of Paint and Victoria, or a pun on Pretoria.
- Paperia, the Paper Planet - Its Hero is Captain Paper, The planet's name is a pun on Paper.
- Drawopolis, the Drawing Planet - Its Creator is Sketch, The planet's name is a portmanteau of Draw and Metropolis.
- Sculpturon, the Sculpture Planet - Its Sculptor is Seraphina, The planet's name is a portmanteau of Sculpture and Ron or a pun on Sculpture.
- Groovopolis, the Music and Dance Planet - Its Dancer is Melody, The planet's name is a portmanteau of Groove and Metropolis.
- Cooktopia, the Cooking Planet - Its Chef is Chef Zesty, The planet's name is a portmanteau of Cook and Utopia.

== Episodes ==
=== Season 1 (2013–14) ===
| No. overall | Segment no. | Title | Story by | Teleplay by | Original release date |
|---|---|---|---|---|---|
| 1 | 1 2 | Arty's Masterpiece (1a) | Angela C. Santomero & Becky Friedman | Angela C. Santomero | April 15, 2013 |
| 1 | 1 2 | A Home for Bunny (1b) | Angela C. Santomero & Becky Friedman | Angela C. Santomero | April 15, 2013 |
| 2 | 3 4 | "Mom's Birthday" (2a) | Angela C. Santomero & Becky Friedman | Angela C. Santomero | June 23, 2014 |
| 2 | 3 4 | "A Present for Baby Georgia" (2b) | Angela C. Santomero & Becky Friedman | Angela C. Santomero | June 23, 2014 |
2b: Arty flies to Fabrictopia to sew a toy for his baby sister Georgia when she becomes crying nonstop.
| 3 | 5 6 | "Jackson's Action Painting" (3a) | Angela C. Santomero & Becky Friedman | Becky Friedman | June 24, 2014 |
| 3 | 5 6 | "Arty's Play Safari" (3b) | Angela C. Santomero & Becky Friedman | Becky Friedman | June 24, 2014 |
3a: Arty and Jackson go to painting class on Paintora.
| 4 | 7 8 | "Annie's Bracelet" (4a) | Angela C. Santomero & Becky Friedman | Jennifer Hamburg | June 25, 2014 |
| 4 | 7 8 | "Arty's Team Shirt" (4b) | Angela C. Santomero & Becky Friedman | Becky Friedman | June 25, 2014 |
4a: When Annie loses her bracelet, she and Arty fly to Sculptron to make a new one.
| 5 | 9 10 | "Annie's Flower" (5a) | Angela C. Santomero & Becky Friedman | Jennifer Hamburg | June 26, 2014 |
| 5 | 9 10 | "Arty's Indoor Campout" (5b) | Angela C. Santomero & Becky Friedman | Angela C. Santomero | June 26, 2014 |
5b: When the rain ruins Arty's campout, big ideas come to the rescue.
| 6 | 11 12 | "Jackson's Dog" (6a) | Angela C. Santomero & Becky Friedman | Leah Gotcsik | June 27, 2014 |
| 6 | 11 12 | "Arty's Play" (6b) | Angela C. Santomero & Becky Friedman | Eva Steele Saccio | June 27, 2014 |
| 7 | 13 14 | "Arty's Art-y Party" (7a) | Angela C. Santomero & Becky Friedman | Becky Friedman | October 6, 2014 |
| 7 | 13 14 | "Arty's Birthday Treasure" (7b) | Angela C. Santomero & Becky Friedman | Angela C. Santomero | October 6, 2014 |
7b: When Baby Georgia ruins Arty's Treasure Box for his birthday, he flies to Buildora to create a new treasure box.
| 8 | 15 16 | "Bathtime with Arty" (8a) | Angela C. Santomero & Becky Friedman | Jill Cozza Turner | October 7, 2014 |
| 8 | 15 16 | "Dinner Time!" (8b) | Angela C. Santomero & Becky Friedman | Jennifer Hamburg | October 7, 2014 |
| 9 | 17 18 | "Family Fun Night" (9a) | Angela C. Santomero & Becky Friedman | Jennifer Hamburg | October 8, 2014 |
| 9 | 17 18 | "Game Night" (9b) | Angela C. Santomero & Becky Friedman | Becky Friedman | October 8, 2014 |
| 10 | 19 20 | "Arty's Paint with Annie" (10a) | Angela C. Santomero, Becky Friedman and Raye Lankford | Raye Lankford | October 9, 2014 |
| 10 | 19 20 | "Arty's Color" (10b) | Angela C. Santomero & Becky Friedman | Leah Gotcsik | October 9, 2014 |
| 11 | 21 22 | "Arty's Artistic Lunch" (11a) | Angela C. Santomero & Becky Friedman | Jill Cozza Turner | October 10, 2014 |
| 11 | 21 22 | "Art After Lunch" (11b) | Angela C. Santomero & Becky Friedman | Raye Lankford | October 10, 2014 |
11a: No one is buying Arty and Juju's lunch sandwiches, but they find a way to make better sandwiches. 11b: There's no room left for Arty and Juju's trash. What can they do?
| 12 | 23 24 | "Arty's Book" (12a) | Angela C. Santomero & Becky Friedman | Leah Gotcsik | October 10, 2014 |
| 12 | 23 24 | "Arty's Grumpy Day" (12b) | Angela C. Santomero & Raye Lankford | Jennifer Hamburg | October 10, 2014 |
| 13 | 25 26 | "Baby Georgia's First Christmas" (13a) | Angela C. Santomero & Becky Friedman | Angela C. Santomero | December 8, 2014 |
| 13 | 25 26 | "Christmas Memories" (13b) | Angela C. Santomero & Becky Friedman | Jennifer Hamburg | December 8, 2014 |
13a: Arty cheers up Baby Georgia by making a snowglobe from Sculpturon.

=== Season 2 (2016–17) ===
| No. overall | Segment no. | Title | Story by | Teleplay by | Original release date |
|---|---|---|---|---|---|
| 14 | 27 28 | "Dad's Breakfast Birthday" (14a) | Angela C. Santomero & Becky Friedman | Becky Friedman | September 12, 2016 |
| 14 | 27 28 | "Dad's Restaurant Birthday" (14b) | Angela C. Santomero & Becky Friedman | Becky Friedman | September 12, 2016 |
| 15 | 29 30 | "The Tooth Fairy, Part 1" (15a) | Angela C. Santomero | Angela C. Santomero | September 13, 2016 |
| 15 | 29 30 | "The Tooth Fairy, Part 2" (15b) | Angela C. Santomero | Angela C. Santomero | September 13, 2016 |
| 16 | 31 32 | "Arty's Aquarium" (16a) | Angela C. Santomero & Becky Friedman | Becky Friedman | September 14, 2016 |
| 16 | 31 32 | "Annie's Contraption" (16b) | Angela C. Santomero & Becky Friedman | Jennifer Hamburg | September 14, 2016 |
16b: Annie sprains her ankle while playing with Arty and is forced to stay on the couch. So Arty decides to build a Rube Goldberg machine to make her happy.
| 17 | 33 34 | "Birdie Ballet" (17a) | Angela C. Santomero & Becky Friedman | Jill Cozza-Turner | September 15, 2016 |
| 17 | 33 34 | "Arty's Instrument" (17b) | Angela C. Santomero & Becky Friedman | N/A | September 15, 2016 |
| 18 | 35 36 | "Arty's Art Walk" (18a) | Melinda LaRose | Melinda LaRose | September 16, 2016 |
| 18 | 35 36 | "Arty's Fort" (18b) | Kevin Monk | N/A | September 16, 2016 |
| 19 | 37 38 | "Juju's Rainbow" (19a) | Leah Gotcsik | Leah Gotcsik | September 19, 2016 |
| 19 | 37 38 | "Creative Galaxy Festival" (19b) | Wendy Harris | Wendy Harris | September 19, 2016 |
19a: A rainbow appears, Juju comes around and forgets to see it. However, a surprise rainbow comes to the rescue.
| 20 | 39 40 | "Arty's Fall Painting" (20a) | Jennifer Hamburg | Jennifer Hamburg | September 20, 2016 |
| 20 | 39 40 | "A State for the Arty Sign" (20b) | Jill Cozza-Turner | Jill Cozza-Turner | September 20, 2016 |
| 21 | 41 42 | "Arty's Outdoor Movie" (21a) | Dustin Ferrer | Dustin Ferrer | September 21, 2016 |
| 21 | 41 42 | "Silly Story for Baby Georgia" (21b) | Lucas Mills | Lucas Mills | September 21, 2016 |
21b: When Jackson's dog knocks over the Outdoor Movie Night snacks, Arty comes to the rescue.
| 22 | 43 | "Arty's Bootastic Halloween" | Angela C. Santomero | Jennifer Hamburg | September 22, 2016 |
Arty celebrates Halloween in the Creative Galaxy.
| 23 | 44 45 | "Juju's Birdhouse" (23a) | Jennifer Hamburg | Jennifer Hamburg | September 23, 2016 |
| 23 | 44 45 | "Arty's Art Car" (23b) | Leah Gotcsik | Leah Gotcsik | September 23, 2016 |
| 24 | 46 47 | "Arty's Eggcellent Adventure" (24a) | Jill Cozza-Turner | Jill Cozza-Turner | September 26, 2016 |
| 24 | 46 47 | "Hoppy Easter Dinner" (24b) | Kevin Monk | Kevin Monk | September 26, 2016 |
| 25 | 48 49 | "Epiphany's Dino Dance" (25a) | Melinda LaRose | Melinda LaRose | September 27, 2016 |
| 25 | 48 49 | "Epiphany & Eureka" (25b) | Lucas Mills | Dustin Ferrer | September 27, 2016 |
| 26 | 50 | "Heart Day" | Angela C. Santomero and Jennifer Hamburg | Angela C. Santomero and Jennifer Hamburg | February 6, 2017 |

=== Season 3 (2018–2019) ===
This is the only season to feature a crossover with Taratabong

| No. overall | Segment no. | Title | Story by | Teleplay by | Original release date |
|---|---|---|---|---|---|
| 27 | 51 | "Arty's Holiday Masterpiece" | Jennifer Hamburg | Jennifer Hamburg | November 19, 2018 |
| 28 | 52 53 | "Come Back Winter" (28a) | Pammy Salmon | Pammy Salmon | June 3, 2019 |
| 28 | 52 53 | "Arty's Arthouse" (28b) | Jennifer Hamburg | Jennifer Hamburg | June 3, 2019 |
28a: When all the snow turns to mud, Arty's creativity comes to the rescue.
| 29 | 54 55 | "Lunar New Year: Part 1" (29a) | Jon Greenberg | Jon Greenberg | June 4, 2019 |
| 29 | 54 55 | "Lunar New Year: Part 2" (29b) | Jill Cozza-Turner | Jill Cozza-Turner | June 4, 2019 |
| 30 | 56 57 | "Taking Care of Splatter" (30a) | Pammy Salmon | Pammy Salmon | June 5, 2019 |
| 30 | 56 57 | "Mom's Overnight Trip" (30b) | Jon Greenberg | Jon Greenberg | June 5, 2019 |
30a: When Splatter plans to ruin Georgia's stuffie, Arty must save the day.
| 31 | 58 | "Galaxy Day" | Jill Cozza-Turner | Jill Cozza-Turner | June 6, 2019 |
When the galaxy gets impacted by a big storm, Arty and his friends must help it with art.
| 32 | 59 60 | "Epiphany's Jungle Jar" (32a) | Susan Kim | Susan Kim | June 7, 2019 |
| 32 | 59 60 | "Playdate Adventure" (32b) | Pammy Salmon | Pammy Salmon | June 7, 2019 |
| 33 | 61 62 | "Baby Georgia's Art Dance" (33a) | Susan Kim | Susan Kim | June 10, 2019 |
| 33 | 61 62 | "The Arttacular Galaxy Magician" (33b) | Pammy Salmon | Pammy Salmon | June 10, 2019 |
| 34 | 63 64 | "Family Snack Off" (34a) | Denise Brossman | Denise Brossman | June 11, 2019 |
| 34 | 63 64 | "Family Day Picnic" (34b) | Denise Brossman | Denise Brossman | June 11, 2019 |
| 35 | 65 66 | "Sleepover on Museo: Part 1" (35a) | Jennifer Hamburg | Jennifer Hamburg | June 12, 2019 |
| 35 | 65 66 | "Sleepover on Museo: Part 2" (35b) | Susan Kim | Susan Kim | June 12, 2019 |
| 36 | 67 68 | "Arty & Juju's Movie Masterpiece" (36a) | Jill Cozza-Turner | Jill Cozza-Turner | June 13, 2019 |
| 36 | 67 68 | "Captain Blah!" (36b) | Angela C. Santomero, M.A. & Wendy Harris | Susan Kim & Patty Salmon | June 13, 2019 |
36b: When a villain steals Arty's art, he must get it back.
