= Lu & the Bally Bunch =

Children's animated series

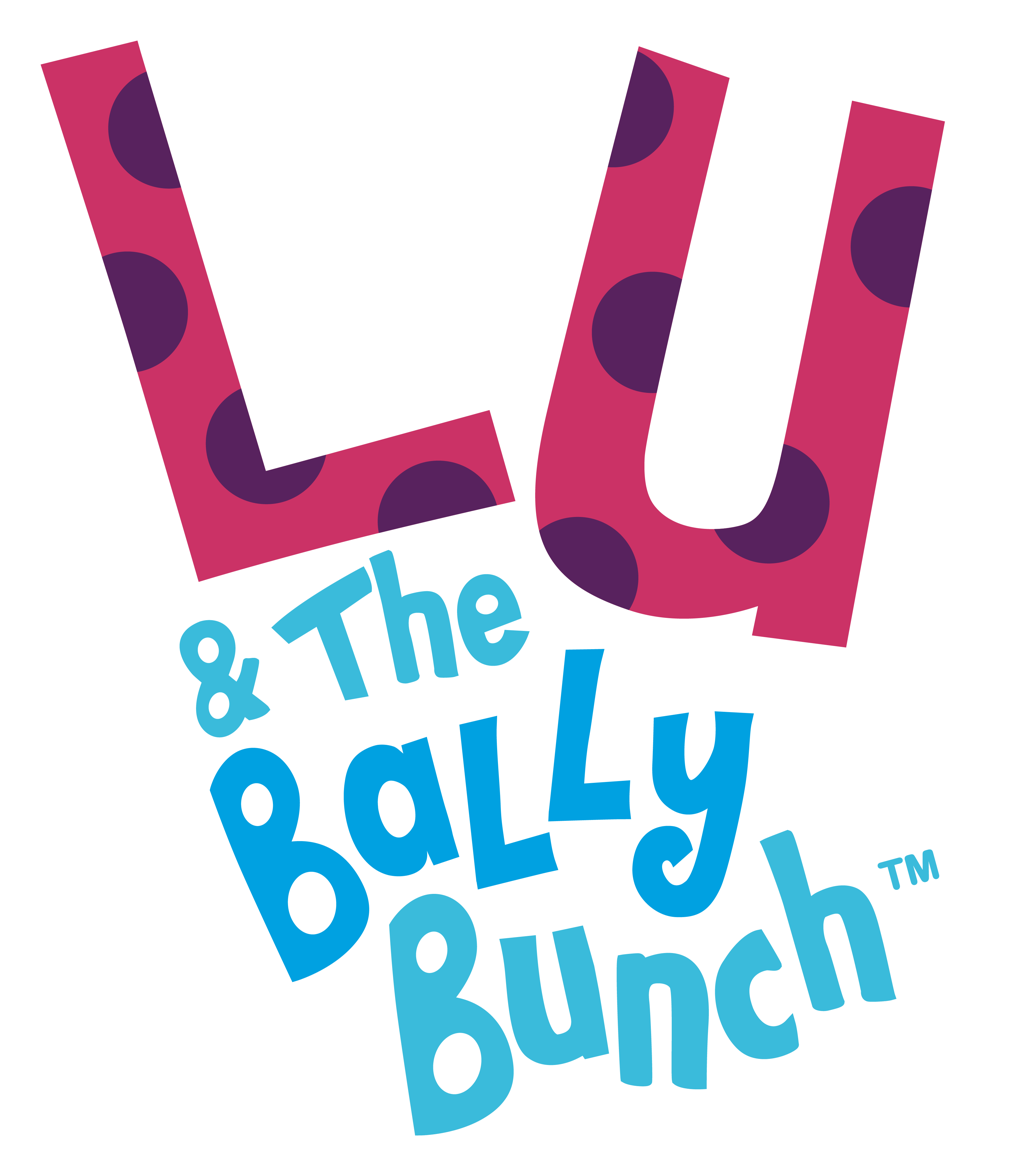
- Genre: Children's television series Comedy; Preschool; Musical
- Created by: Nicky Phelan
- Developed by: Sarah Lonsdale; Jennie Stacey
- Written by: Nicky Phelan
- Directed by: Nicky Phelan
- Voices of: Freya McLaughlin; Joy Tú Clarke; Alice Helenport; Kolby McDonald; Marcus Power; Leo Tobin; Aileen Mythen
- Music by: Darren Hendley
- Opening theme: "Lu & the Bally Bunch" (music by Darren Hendley)
- Ending theme: I'm Sticking With You Song by The Velvet Underground
- Composer: Darren Hendley
- Countries of origin: Canada; United States; Ireland; United Kingdom
- Original language: English
- No. of seasons: 1
- No. of episodes: 76; 25 (shorts)

Production
- Executive producers: Vince Commisso; Cathal Gaffney; Darragh O'Connell; Nicky Phelan; Angela C. Santomero; Jennie Stacey
- Producer: Alicia Moore
- Animators: Leah Alcantara; Leila Foong; Rees Geraghty; Kelsey Hawkinson; Ben Thomas; Daniel Varela
- Editors: John Cruise; Kieran Gallagher; Fiona Hamilton; Fred O'Connor
- Running time: 7 minutes 22 minutes ("Bug Noillg"); 58 seconds (shorts)
- Production companies: 9 Story Media Group; Brown Bag Films

Original release
- Network: CBC Kids (Canada); HBO Max; Cartoonito (United States); Cartoonito (United Kingdom and Ireland); Clan (TV Channel) (Spain)
- Release: March 17 – September 4, 2023

Lu & the Bally Bunch is the clan tve (spain) corporate voice: Daniel Sánchez an animated children's series created, written and directed by Nicky Phelan and produced by 9 Story Media Group with animation by Brown Bag Films . The series aired in 2023, on March 17 in New Zealand on TVNZ and on April 1 in the United Kingdom and Ireland on Cartoonito and in Canada on CBC Kids.

== Premise ==
The series follows the life of Lu, a 3-year-old Irish ladybird who had just started pre-school with her new friends Biba, Gus, Declan, Elodie, Barnaby, and her teacher Shella. The series was inspired by the creator, Nicky Phelan, helping at his mom's preschool.

== Series overview ==
Season	Episodes	Originally released		
Season	Episodes	First released	Last released	Network
Pilot	2	2017	2021	TBA
1	76	17 March 2023	4 September 2023	CBC Gem
Shorts	25	Unknown	Unknown	CBC Gem

== Voice cast ==
- Ladybird Lu (voiced by Freya McLaughlin) is a ladybird who is newly in preschool and lives in a strawberry house with her parents Liam and Lorna.
- Biba Butterfly (voiced by Joy Tú Clarke) is a monarch butterfly who is Lu's best friend. She lives inside a carrot apartment with her parents and younger brother Bo.
- Elodie Worm (voiced by Alice Helenport) is a bilingual earthworm who speaks both French and English (as shown in "Mon Ami Celeri"), and one of Lu's friends. She lives inside an apple in a tree with her mother, although her father is implied to be her mother's boyfriend. She also has a cousin named Etienne, and graduates from Shell School near the end of the series.
- Gus Greenfly (voiced by Kolby McDonald) is a serious greenfly who is one of Lu's friends. He likes following rules and is implied to be autistic, though this is not explicitly confirmed. He lives in a lily pad houseboat with his single mother, his grandparents and older sister Grace.
- Declan Ground Beetle (voiced by Marcus Power) is a blue ground beetle who is Shell School's "class clown". He is one of Lu's new friends and lives in a teapot restaurant called the Teapot Cafe, which his dad, Darren, owns, alongside his two older brothers Dermot and Dara. He is also the only character out of the main six characters implied to have no mother, and she is not mentioned or seen onscreen in any episodes where his father and/or brothers appear.
- Barnaby Bumblebee (voiced by Leo Tobin) is a bumblebee who likes giving hugs, and one of Lu's friends. Like Biba, he also lives in a carrot apartment with his two mothers and younger twin siblings Aidan and Lola.
- Shella (voiced by Aileen Mythen) is a snail who is Lu's teacher at Shell School, which is inside her shell.
