= Furze World Wonders =

2017 Canadian web series

- Genre: Reality-TV; Comedy
- Created by: Jeff Copeland; Stephen Sloot
- Starring: Colin Furze
- Country of origin: Canada; United States
- Original language: English

Production
- Producers: Vince Commisso; Barry Davis; Natalie Dumoulin; Tanya Green
- Running time: 22 minutes
- Production company: 9 Story Media Group

Original release
- Network: YouTube Red
- Release: September 28 – November 22, 2017

Furze World Wonders is an American-Canadian web television series starring inventor and YouTuber Colin Furze, who uses extreme skills to help others with their own creations.

Produced by Canada's 9 Story Media Group, the series was first released on YouTube Red on September 28, 2017.

== Episodes ==
No.	Title	Runtime	Original release date
1	"Flaming DIY BMX Jam"	20:56	September 28, 2017
2	"Rock Show on Wheels"	21:05	September 28, 2017
3	"Water Rocket GUINNESS WORLD RECORDS Record Breaker"	21:09	October 4, 2017
4	"Supersized Pinball"	20:24	October 11, 2017
5	"House of Horror and Hilarity"	20:20	October 18, 2017
6	"Booming Medieval Fair"	21:24	October 25, 2017
7	"Ultimate Pooch Palace"	20:46	November 1, 2017
8	"Waterfight Battle Barge"	21:07	November 8, 2017
9	"Two Story Glamping Tent"	21:06	November 15, 2017
10	"The Pyro School Bus"	20:55	November 22, 2017

== Reception ==
Common Sense Media's Melissa Camacho wrote, "tweens may still be drawn to Furze World Wonders thanks to his high energy, sense of humor, and edgy inventions. ... It's more entertaining than educational, but there's still something to be learned from it." Writing in Popular Mechanics, Avery Thompson said, "While this show is great fun with excellent pacing, it might leave something to be desired for fans of DIY builds. While there's lots of focus on planning and delivering the builds, the actual build process happens mostly behind the scenes. The best thing you'll get is a few timelapse welding shots and Furze explaining how the finished product works."
