= Angela's Christmas Wish =

Animated family film

- Film poster
- Directed by: Damein O' Connor
- Written by: Frank McCourt; Damien O' Connor
- Starring: Anya O' Connor; Ruth Negga; Mos Dunford
- Production companies: Brown Bag Films; 9 Story Media Group
- Distributed by: Netflix
- Release date: December 1, 2020
- Running time: 47 minutes
- Countries: Ireland; Canada
- Language: English

Angela's Christmas Wish is an animated family film written and directed by Damien O'Connor. It was released on Netflix on December 1, 2020. It features the voices of Lucy O'Connell, Brendan Mullins, and Ruth Negga. The main character is Angela, and she wishes to reunite her family for Christmas, particularly her father, who is working in Australia.

It is the sequel to Angela's Christmas, which was nominated for an Emmy, and is inspired by a story written by Frank McCourt.

== Plot ==
In Limerick, 1913, a young Angela watches her father leave for Australia before getting a chance to sing a song to him.

Two years later, one year after the events of the first film, on Christmas Eve, Angela tells Baby Jesus her Christmas wish, wishing it would be a doll from a toy shop. But Mother's strict house duties prevent it from happening. Back at home, Mother tells the children a story about a King and Pauper who get one wish each from a Genie, but the Pauper's wish is never fully told, with the only words being "I wish, I wish, I wish...".

While cleaning up their rooms, Angela wonders why her mother has been so strict every year. Tom explains that she misses their father, and Angela comes up with several plans to get their father back from Australia. Angela, along with her brother Pat, start by digging holes, but fail after trying to dig both theirs and their neighbor's backyard. Then they go to a library for more evidence and mistakenly believe that Australia is very close to Ireland, and they could get a train there.

After they find local Mr. McGinty, who explains that his cow is giving birth to a baby and needs money for a vet to help her, Angela tries to earn money in a bar but fails to get attention. Pat walks into the bar, and they start singing Angela's song she wanted to sing for her father, and they earn wide amounts of money.

Angela goes to a vet's house to help, and there she meets Dorothy. Her father explains that it is impossible to get a train to Australia, which causes Angela and Pat to split up, but Dorothy comes to help them both.

They arrive at a ship dock in an attempt to sail to Australia to bring Angela's father home. They narrowly escape the dock worker. Angela manages to reach the ship, but it leaves before she can get on, and the worker asks a guard to bring them home. Worried about her mother's thoughts, she returns home and explains what happened, but she does not mind and tells what the pauper had wished for: happiness from his heart, and they start telling their wishes. Angela goes to the side of the room, puts a frame of her father on her chest, and starts her wish. When she turns around, she finds her father, who has returned home, much to her shock and excitement, thinking she had wished for him.

Some time later, Angela manages to save Mr. McGinty's cow, finds out more about Australia from her father, and lives a better life. At night, her father kisses Angela goodnight, and she goes to sleep.

== Cast ==
- Lucy O'Connell as Angela
  - Anya O'Connor as Young Angela
- Brendan Mullins as Pat
- Lola Metcalfe as Dorothy
- Ruth Negga as Mother
- Oscar Butler as Tom
- Shona Hamill as Aggie
- Moe Dunford as Father
- Caitríona Balfe as Dorothy's mother
- Jared Harris as the Vet/Dorothy's father
- Pat Kinevane as Mr McGinty
- Janet Moran as Mrs Blake
- James Nolan as Dock Worker
- Don Wycherley as Accordion player
