= Wishenpoof! =

Animated television series

- Genre: Fantasy; Preschool; Comedy
- Created by: Angela Santomero
- Voices of: Addison Holley; Scott McCord
- Opening theme: "Wishenpoof" by Hope Cassandra
- Countries of origin: United States; Canada
- No. of seasons: 2
- No. of episodes: 39

Production
- Executive producer: Angela Santomero
- Running time: 24 minutes
- Production companies: Amazon Studios; DHX Studios Halifax; Out of the Blue Enterprises

Original release
- Network: Amazon Video
- Release: February 5, 2014 – May 9, 2019

Wishenpoof! is an animated preschool children's fantasy television series which aired for two seasons, from February 5, 2014 to May 9, 2019. The series was created by Angela Santomero and stars Addison Holley as Bianca, a young fairy girl who grants children's wishes. The series was produced throughout 39 episodes, and was produced by Amazon Studios and Out of the Blue Enterprises in the United States and DHX Studios Halifax in Canada.

== Characters ==
- Bartholomew, a teddy bear from the Enchanted Forest
- Beatrice, a teddy bear from the Enchanted Forest
- Ben, Bianca's younger brother
- Betty, a teddy bear from the Enchanted Forest
- Bianca, a brown-haired, blue-eyed, 6-year-old girl, who has wish magic and solves problems in addition to helping other characters throughout the series.
- Bianca's dad
- Bianca's fairy grandmother, who has wish magic
- Bianca's mom, who has wish magic
- Bob, Bianca's teddy bear and "best friend" from the Enchanted Forest.
- Bouncer, a teddy bear from the Enchanted Forest
- Bruno, an ogre who is friends with Bianca's fairy grandmother
- Charlie, one of Bianca's friends/schoolmates
- Frank, one of Bianca's friends she plays with at the willow tree (Frank also has wish magic).
- Froovle, Frank's pet
- Laurel, one of Bianca's friends she plays with at the willow tree (Laurel also has wish magic).
- Lola, a pink teddy bear from the Enchanted Forest
- Miss Bridget, Bianca's schoolteacher
- Oliver, one of Bianca's friends/schoolmates
- Penelope, one of Bianca's friends/schoolmates
- Pickles, Penelope's toy, purple domestic horse (not magically alive, at least in season 1)
- Piggie, Ben's stuffed domestic pig
- Violet, one of Bianca's friends/schoolmates

== Voices ==
- Addison Holley as Bianca (speaking voice)
- Hope Cassandra as Bianca (singing voice)
- Scott McCord as Bob
- Alyson Court as Bianca's mom (pilot)
- Katie Griffin as Bianca's mom (series), and Betty
- Jason Priestley as Bianca's dad
- Kaelyn Breitkopf as Ben
- Johnny Orlando - Oliver
- Aaron Feigenbaum as Charlie
- Adrian David Lloyd as Frank
- Allison Augustin as Penelope (pilot)
- Ava Priestly as Laurel
- Carrie Adelstein as Lola
- Devan Cohen as Charlie
- Jeff Geddis as Bouncer
- John Davis as Froovle
- Emma Davis as Miss Bridget
- Kathleen Laskey as Bianca's fairy grandma
- Kristin Fairlie as Beatrice
- Matthew MacFadzean as Bruno the Ogre, and Bartholomew
- Millie Davis as Penelope
- Saara Chaudry as Violet

== Episodes ==
=== Season 1 (2014–15) ===
No.	Title	Directed by	Written by	Original release date
1	"Welcome to Wish World"	Gilly Fogg	Angela C. Santomero	February 5, 2014
2	"Willow Tree Wishes"	Gilly Fogg	Angela C. Santomero	August 14, 2015
3	"Bianca's Passion Project"	Gilly Fogg	Angela C. Santomero	August 14, 2015
4	"Bianca and Penelope's Clubhouse"	Cam Lizotte	Becky Friedman	August 14, 2015
5	"Frank's Pet Froovle"	Cam Lizotte	Jill Cozza-Turner	August 14, 2015
6	"Bianca Gets Creative"	Cam Lizotte	Becky Friedman	August 14, 2015
7	"Bianca's Tough Kid Challenge"	Cam Lizotte	Becky Friedman	August 14, 2015
8	"Bianca's Great Cake Mistake"	Gilly Fogg	Becky Friedman	August 14, 2015
9	"Bianca's Big Idea"	Gilly Fogg	Jill Cozza-Turner	August 14, 2015
10	"Adventure to Fairy Grandma's House"	Gilly Fogg	Jill Cozza-Turner	August 14, 2015
11	"Bianca's Rainstorm Brainstorm"	Cam Lizotte	Jill Cozza-Turner	August 14, 2015
12	"Friends Forever"	Cam Lizotte	Becky Friedman	August 14, 2015
13	"Ben's Big Surprise"	Gilly Fogg	Angela C. Santomero	August 14, 2015

=== Season 2 (2017–19) ===
No. overall	Title	Directed by	Written by	Original release date
14	"Ben's Wish Magic"	Gilly Fogg	Angela C. Santomero	September 26, 2017
15	"Bianca's Museum Trip"	Cam Lizotte	Becky Friedman	September 26, 2017
16	"Fun Surprises"	Jay Silver	Jill Cozza-Turner	September 26, 2017
Bianca gets upset when a day at the park doesn't go as planned.
17	"Save That Stuffie!"	Gilly Fogg	Jill Cozza-Turner	September 26, 2017
18	"Daddy Daughter Day"	Cam Lizotte	Jennifer Hamburg	September 26, 2017
19	"Bianca's Thing"	Cam Lizotte	Angela C. Santomero	September 26, 2017
20	"Bianca's Wishenfairies"	Jay Silver	Jill Cozza-Turner	September 26, 2017
21	"Bianca's Pony"	Jay Silver	Jill Cozza-Turner	September 26, 2017
22	"Ben Saves the Day"	Gilly Fogg & Cam Lizotte	Jill Cozza-Turner	September 26, 2017
23	"The Main Street Carnival"	Gilly Fogg	Jennifer Hamburg	September 26, 2017
24	"Winter Wishes"	Jay Silver	Angela C. Santomero	September 26, 2017
25	"A Wish World Christmas - Part 1"	Cam Lizotte	Angela C. Santomero & Becky Friedman	September 26, 2017
26	"A Wish World Christmas - Part 2"	Cam Lizotte	Angela C. Santomero & Becky Friedman	September 26, 2017
27	"Save the Playground"	Gilly Fogg	Becky Friedman	September 6, 2018
When the playground closes down due to a fallen tree that broke the slide, Bianca and her friends must work together to sell lemonade for a new one.
28	"Bianca's Family Camping Trip"	Gilly Fogg	Alan Resnick	September 6, 2018
29	"Bob Gets the Sneezes"	Gilly Fogg	Alan Resnick	September 6, 2018
30	"Biancas Big Wish Magic Mistake"	Gilly Fogg	Florian Wagner	September 6, 2018
31	"Wishball with Bruno"	Gilly Fogg	Florian Wagner	September 6, 2018
32	"Bianca's Big Vote"	Gilly Fogg	Alan Resnick	September 6, 2018
33	"Dinner with Grandmas"	Gilly Fogg	Alan Resnick	September 6, 2018
34	"Bianca and Bianca"	David Feiss	Florian Wagner	May 9, 2019
35	"The Magical Wish Store"	David Feiss	Alan Resnick	May 9, 2019
36	"Grammie's Wish"	David Feiss	Alan Resnick	May 9, 2019
37	"Penelope's Show"	David Feiss	Florian Wagner	May 9, 2019
38	"Froovle and the Dollhouse"	David Feiss	Alan Resnick	May 9, 2019
39	"The Scavenger Hunt"	David Feiss	Florian Wagner	May 9, 2019
