= C.O.R.E. Digital Pictures =

Canadian animation studio

- Type: Private
- Industry: CGI animation
- Founded: March 31, 1994; 32 years ago
- Founder: William Shatner; Bob Munroe; John Mariella; Kyle Menzies
- Defunct: March 15, 2010; 16 years ago
- Fate: Suspended operations
- Headquarters: Toronto, Ontario, Canada
- Divisions: C.O.R.E. Digital Pictures; C.O.R.E. Toons; C.O.R.E. Feature Animation
- Website: www.coredp.com (archived 2007-06-24)

C.O.R.E. Digital Pictures was a Canadian film and television animation and special effects studio based in Toronto, and founded in March 1994. Its productions included fully animated television series and feature films.

C.O.R.E. signed a production collaboration agreement with Radar Pictures.

== History ==
C.O.R.E. Digital Pictures was founded in 1994 by John Mariella, Kyle Menzies, Bob Munroe, and William Shatner.

Its animated feature film, The Wild, was distributed by Walt Disney Pictures (United States). It met with unfavorable critical and commercial reaction.

As with most Canadian VFX firms, a rising exchange rate, coupled with a decline in employment due to the economic downturn, would take a negative toll on C.O.R.E. After failing to secure a loan guarantee from the provincial government of Ontario, C.O.R.E. ceased operations on March 15, 2010.

== C.O.R.E. Digital Pictures ==
- Cats & Dogs: The Revenge of Kitty Galore (Warner Bros. Pictures / Village Roadshow Pictures)
- Killshot (The Weinstein Company / FilmColony / A Band Apart / Lawrence Bender Productions)
- Firehouse Dog (New Regency Productions / Twentieth Century Fox)
- Silent Hill (Davis Films / Wander Star / TriStar Pictures)
- Lucky Number Slevin (Ascendant Pictures / The Weinstein Company)
- Hotel for Dogs (DreamWorks Pictures / Nickelodeon Movies)
- Resident Evil: Apocalypse (Screen Gems / Davis Films / Impact Pictures)
- Siblings (Canadian Film Centre)
- Duma (Warner Bros. Pictures)
- Harold & Kumar Go to White Castle (Senator Films / New Line Cinema)
- New York Minute (Warner Bros. Pictures)
- My Baby's Daddy (Miramax Films)
- Malibu's Most Wanted (Warner Bros. Pictures)
- Nothing (49th Parallel)
- Against the Ropes (Cort-Madden Productions / Paramount Pictures)
- They (Radar Pictures)
- Cypher (Pandora / Miramax Films)
- Blade II (New Line Cinema)
- The Time Machine (DreamWorks Pictures / Warner Bros. Pictures)
- Who Is Cletis Tout? (Fireworks / Paramount Classics)
- Glitter (Columbia Pictures)
- The Caveman's Valentine (Franchise Pictures / Jersey Films / Universal Studios)
- Finding Forrester (Columbia Pictures)
- Nutty Professor II: The Klumps (Universal Pictures)
- X-Men (Marvel Entertainment Group / Twentieth Century Fox)
- Thomas and the Magic Railroad (Gullane Pictures / Destination Films)
- Knockaround Guys (New Line Cinema)
- Snow Day (Paramount Pictures / Nickelodeon Movies)
- A Walk on the Moon (Punch Productions / Miramax Films)
- Dr. Dolittle (Twentieth Century Fox)
- The Big Hit (Columbia/TriStar Pictures)
- The Mighty (Alliance / Miramax)
- Flubber (Disney)
- Mimic (Dimension Films / Miramax)
- Spawn (New Line Cinema)
- Cube (Canadian Film Centre)
- Fly Away Home (Columbia Pictures)
- Johnny Mnemonic (TriStar Pictures)
- The Spine (National Film Board of Canada)

=== Television ===
Series, unless mentioned otherwise.

- The Tudors
- National Aboriginal Achievement Awards National Aboriginal Achievement Foundation
- The Blobheads - Absolute Studios/Wark Clements/Decode Entertainment
- Code Breakers – MOW Orly Adelson Productions/ESPN Original Entertainment
- Kevin Hill – Kevin Hill Prods. Inc./ABC, Inc.
- Anonymous Rex – Pilot Fox Television/ Sci-Fi
- Wonderfalls – Pilot and Series, Fox Television
- The Music Man – MOW The Disney Channel
- Spinning Boris – MOW Dufferin Gate Productions/ Showtime
- Salem Witch Trials – MOW Alliance Atlantis Communications/Spring Creek Productions
- Tru Confessions (The Disney Channel, MOW)
- The Zack Files (Decode Entertainment for Fox Family/Channel 4)
- The Rats (Cort-Madden Productions/Fox Television, MOW)
- Prancer Returns (USA Studios, MOW)
- The Feast of All Saints (Dufferin Gate/Showtime, miniseries)
- Jett Jackson: The Movie (Alliance/Atlantis & The Disney Channel, MOW)
- The Four Seasons (MOW)
- Don Giovanni: Leporello's Revenge (Rhombus Media/CBC, MOW)
- Model Behavior (Disney Telefilms/The Wonderful World of Disney, MOW)
- PSI Factor (Atlantis/Alliance/CTV, Seasons I, II, III & IV)
- Sandy Bottom Orchestra (Dufferin Gate Productions/Showtime, MOW)
- Dead Aviators (Temple Street Productions/Showtime/CBC, MOW)
- Sea People (Temple Street Productions/Showtime, MOW)
- John Woo's Once a Thief (Alliance Communications)
- LEXX (TiMe Film/Salter Street Films)
- Shock Treatment (Alliance/CBS, pilot)
- Government of Playhouse (cancelled pitch pilot)
- Tek War (Atlantis Films)

=== Games ===
- Midnight Club 3 (Rockstar Games, intro sequence)

== C.O.R.E. Toons ==
- Dudson (Decode Entertainment)
- The Naughty Naughty Pets (Decode Entertainment /CBC )
- The Save-Ums! (Decode Entertainment / Discovery Kids / CBC / The Dan Clark Company)
- Angela Anaconda (Decode Entertainment / Teletoon)
- Brats of the Lost Nebula (Decode Entertainment (pilot only) / Jim Henson Productions / Kids' WB)
- Iggy Arbuckle (Blueprint Entertainment / National Geographic Kids / Teletoon)
- Planet Sketch (Decode Entertainment / Aardman Animations / Teletoon)
- Planet Sheen (Nickelodeon / Nickelodeon Animation Studio / Omation Animation Studio)
- Chop Socky Chooks (Decode Entertainment / Aardman Animations / Cartoon Network UK / Teletoon)
- Paws & Tales (Providential Pictures)
- Franny's Feet (Decode Entertainment / Family Channel / WNET New York (PBS airings))
- Urban Vermin (Decode Entertainment)
- Super Why! (Decode Entertainment / Out of the Blue Enterprises / PBS Kids / CBC Kids)
- Titan Dogs (Tookie Wilson Productions / Augenblick Studios / Whalerock Industries / BermanBraun / Slow Genius / Bento Box Entertainment / Comedy Partners)

== C.O.R.E. Feature Animation ==
- Valiant (2005) (Vanguard Animation / Entertainment Film Distributors / Walt Disney Pictures / Odyssey Entertainment)
- The Wild (2006) (Walt Disney Pictures / Contrafilm)
- Happily N'Ever After (2007) (Lionsgate / Vanguard Animation / Odyssey Entertainment)
