= Out of the Blue Enterprises =

American television production company

Out of the Blue Enterprises LLC
- Type: Private
- Industry: Animation; Preschool
- Founded: January 31, 2005; 21 years ago
- Founders: Angela C. Santomero; Samantha Freeman Alpert
- Defunct: January 12, 2018; 8 years ago
- Fate: Acquired and folded into 9 Story Media Group
- Headquarters: New York City, New York, U.S.

Out of the Blue Enterprises was an American children's television production company based in New York City, founded by the co-creator of the Nickelodeon preschool live action/animated series Blue's Clues (hence the company's name) Angela C. Santomero and fellow ex-Nickelodeon executive Samantha Freeman Alpert. The company served as the producers (with DHX Media's Decode Entertainment unit) of the animated children's television series Super Why! that airs on most PBS stations and on CBC Kids in Canada and Blue's Room which formerly aired on Nick Jr. 9 Story USA, along with Fred Rogers Productions and 9 Story Media Group, also produces an animated spin-off of Mister Rogers' Neighborhood, entitled Daniel Tiger's Neighborhood, which debuted on PBS Kids affiliates on September 3, 2012. It also produced Wishenpoof! and Creative Galaxy with Amazon Studios for Amazon Video.

On January 12, 2018, 9 Story Media Group bought Out of the Blue Enterprises and was later absorbed into 9 Story and kept its New York offices.

== Filmography ==
Show	Creator(s)	First aired	Last aired	Production partner(s)	Network
Blue's Clues	Traci Paige Johnson; Todd Kessler; Angela C. Santomero	September 8, 1996	August 6, 2006	Nickelodeon Animation Studio	Nickelodeon
Blue's Room (season 2)	Traci Paige Johnson; Angela C. Santomero	August 6, 2006	March 29, 2007	Nickelodeon Animation Studio	Nickelodeon
Super Why!	Angela C. Santomero	September 3, 2007	May 12, 2016	Decode Entertainment; C.O.R.E. Toons	PBS (U.S.); CBC Kids (Canada)
Daniel Tiger's Neighborhood	Angela C. Santomero	September 3, 2012	present	Fred Rogers Productions; 9 Story Media Group	PBS
Creative Galaxy	Angela C. Santomero	April 19, 2013	June 4, 2019	Amazon Studios; 9 Story Media Group	Amazon Video
Wishenpoof!	Angela C. Santomero	February 5, 2014	May 9, 2019	DHX Media; Amazon Studios	Amazon Video
Charlie's Colorforms City	Angela C. Santomero	March 22, 2019	June 13, 2022	DHX Media; 9 Story Media Group	Netflix
Blue's Clues & You!	Traci Paige Johnson; Todd Kessler; Angela C. Santomero	November 11, 2019	September 27, 2024	Nickelodeon Animation Studio; Brown Bag Films; 9 Story Media Group	Nickelodeon; Nick Jr. Channel; YouTube
Hello, Jack! The Kindness Show	Jack McBrayer; Angela C. Santomero	November 5, 2021	October 7, 2022	Jax Media; 9 Story Media Group; Brown Bag Films	Apple TV+
