= WildBrain Studios =

Canadian television studio

- Logo used since 2019
- Formerly: DHX Studios (2016–2019)
- Type: Division
- Industry: Animation; Live action
- Predecessors: Wildbrain Entertainment; Studio B Productions; Nerd Corps Entertainment; Epitome Pictures
- Founded: 2016; 10 years ago
- Headquarters: Vancouver, British Columbia, Canada
- Products: Animated television series
- Number of employees: >700 (2020)
- Parent: WildBrain
- Website: www.wildbrain.com/content-creation/studios

WildBrain Studios is the in-house television studio arm of Canadian entertainment company WildBrain based in Vancouver, British Columbia, which was established in 2016 as DHX Studios.

== History ==
In January 2016, DHX Media announced that they would be building a 60,000 square-foot studio in Vancouver, British Columbia, that would focus on both animated and live-action productions. The production teams of the former Studio B Productions, which DHX Media acquired in 2007 and Nerd Corps Entertainment, which DHX acquired in 2014 were relocated to the new building later in the year.

The studio consists of two production teams: the former Nerd Corps team, which focuses on the production of CGI-animated shows, and the former Studio B team, which focuses on the production of 2D-animated shows (including those animated with Adobe Animate).

As of 2019, the Vancouver studio is the only one remaining in the division, as the other studios were either sold off or closed. In 2023, WildBrain acquired the Toronto-based pre-production animation studio House of Cool, which continues to operate under its own branding. Owing to the adoption of work from home practices, the company is set to downsize the Vancouver studio and relocate to new offices within 2026.

== Filmography ==
=== Animated series ===
Title	Creator(s) / Developer(s)	Year(s)	Network	Co-production with	Notes
as DHX Studios
Blaze and the Monster Machines	Jeff Borkin; Ellen Martin; Clark Stubbs	2014–2025	Nick Jr. Channel	Nickelodeon Animation Studio	Seasons 2 to 9. Previously produced by Nerd Corps Entertainment in season 1. Produced as DHX Studios from seasons 2 to 5.
Inspector Gadget	Michael Hirsh; Mark Gosine; Phillip Stamp; Anne Loi	2015–2018	Canada Teletoon (season 1) Family Channel (season 2); United States Netflix Universal Kids (2017–2021)	—N/a	Reboot of the 1983 animated series.
The Mr. Peabody & Sherman Show	David P. Smith	2015–2017	Netflix	Jay Ward Productions; DreamWorks Animation Television	Animation services.
Supernoobs	Scott Fellows; Rob Boutilier; Loris Kramer Lunsford	2015–2019	Canada Teletoon (season 1) Family Channel (season 2); United States Cartoon Network (season 1) Hulu (season 2)	—N/a	
The Deep	Tom Taylor; James Brouwer	2015–2022	7TWO (Australia); Family Chrgd (Canada)	Technicolor (2015–2019); Infinite Studios (2022); A Stark Production; BBC Children's Productions (2022)	Seasons 2 to 4. Previously produced by Nerd Corps Entertainment in season 1. Produced as DHX Studios from seasons 2 to 3.
Looped	Mark Thornton; Todd Kaufman	2016	Teletoon	Neptoon Studios	
Kate & Mim-Mim	Scott Stewart; Julie Stewart	2016–2018	Canada Knowledge Kids and BBC Kids; United Kingdom CBeebies	FremantleMedia Kids & Family Entertainment	Season 2 only. Previously produced by Nerd Corps Entertainment in season 1.
Cloudy with a Chance of Meatballs	Mark Evestaff; Alex Galatis	2017–2018	Canada YTV; United States Cartoon Network (season 1) Boomerang SVOD (season 2)	Corus Entertainment; Sony Pictures Animation	
Chuck's Choice	Kervin Faria	2017	YTV	Corus Entertainment	
Polly Pocket	Stephanie Betts; Shaleen Sangha	2018–2025	Canada Family Jr. and Family Channel (2018) Netflix (seasons 2–5); United States Universal Kids (2019) Netflix (seasons 2–5) Amazon Prime Video (season 6)	Mattel Television	Produced as DHX Studios in season 1.
The Adventures of Rocky and Bullwinkle	Marco Schnabel; David P. Smith	2018–2019	Amazon Prime Video	Jay Ward Productions; DreamWorks Animation Television	Animation services.
Chip and Potato	Billy Macqueen; Catherine Williams; Maddy Darrall	2018–2021	Canada Family Jr.; United States Netflix	Darrall Macqueen	Produced as DHX Studios in season 1.
Mega Man: Fully Charged	Man of Action	2018–2019	Canada Family Chrgd; United States Cartoon Network	Capcom; Dentsu Entertainment USA	
Carmen Sandiego	Duane Capizzi	2019–2021	Netflix	HMH Productions; I Can and I Will Productions	Produced as DHX Studios from seasons 1 to 2.
Ninjago	Tommy Andreasen; Michael Hegner	2019–2022	Cartoon Network	The Lego Group	Seasons 11–15 only. Previously produced by Wil Film ApS from seasons 1 to 10. Produced as DHX Studios in season 11.
Rev & Roll	Julie Stewart; Scott Stewart; Edward Kay	2019	CCTV-14	Alpha Group Co., Ltd.	
Snoopy in Space	Mark Evestaff; Betsy Walters	2019–2021	Apple TV+	Schulz Studio	Produced as DHX Studios in season 1.
as WildBrain Studios
Dorg Van Dango	Fabian Erlinghäuser; Nora Twomey; Nick V. Murphy	2020–2021	Ireland RTÉ; Canada Family Channel	Cartoon Saloon	
Go, Dog. Go!	Adam Peltzman	2021–2023	Netflix	DreamWorks Animation Television	
The Snoopy Show	Rob Boutilier; Mark Evestaff; Alex Galatis	2021–2023	Apple TV+	Schulz Studio	
Johnny Test	Scott Fellows	2021–2022	Netflix	—N/a	Revival of the 2005 animated series.
Strawberry Shortcake: Berry in the Big City	Michael Vogel	2021–2024	YouTube	—N/a	
The Proud Family: Louder and Prouder	Bruce W. Smith; Ralph Farquhar	2022–2023	Disney+	Bar Productions; Disney Television Animation	Animation services for seasons 1 and 2.
Sonic Prime	Man of Action	2022–2024	Netflix	Sega of America; Netflix Animation; Man of Action Entertainment	
Ninjago: Dragons Rising	Tommy Andreasen; Michael Hegner	2023–present	Netflix	The Lego Group	Sequel to Ninjago.
Caillou	—N/a	2024–present	Peacock	—N/a	Reboot of the 1997 animated series.
Camp Snoopy	Scott Montgomery; Rob Boutilier	2024–present	Apple TV+	Schulz Studio	
Lego Monkie Kid	Simon Lucas	2024–present	Kabillion; HappyKids	The Lego Group	Season 5 only.
Max & Maple: The Can-Do Kids	Robert Pasin; Carrie Miller; Deborah Frank; Peter Hannan	2025–present	YouTube	Radio Flyer Studios	
Upcoming
Felix the Cat	TBA	TBA	TBA	DreamWorks Animation Television	
Minecraft	TBA	TBA	Netflix	Mojang Studios; Flying Bark Productions; Netflix Animation	

=== Live-action series ===
Title	Creator(s) / Developer(s)	Year(s)	Network	Co-production with	Notes
DHX Studios
The Zoo		2017–2018	CBBC	BBC Studios	
Are You Afraid of the Dark?	D. J. MacHale; Ned Kandel	2019–2022	Nickelodeon	Yesteryear (2022); ACE Entertainment; Nickelodeon Productions	Season 8 onward. Produced as DHX Studios from seasons 8 to 9.
WildBrain Studios
Letterkenny	Jared Keeso; Jacob Tierney	2019–2023	Canada Crave; United States Hulu	New Metric Media; Bell Media; Play Fun Games Pictures	Season 8 onward. Previously produced by DHX Studios Toronto from seasons 1 to 7.
My Perfect Landing	Frank van Keeken	2020	Canada Family Channel; United Kingdom CBBC	Beachwood Canyon Productions	
Malory Towers	Sasha Hails; Rachel Flowerday	2020–2025	Canada Family Channel; United Kingdom CBBC	King Bert Productions	
Take Note	Joan Lambur	2022	Canada Family Channel; United States Peacock	Lambur Productions	
Ruby and the Well	LeeAnne H. Adams; Brian J. Adams	2022–2024	BYUtv	Shaftesbury Films	
I Woke Up a Vampire	Thomas W. Lynch	2023	Canada; Family Channel; United States; Netflix	Tom Lynch Company	
Yo Gabba GabbaLand!	Christian Jacobs; Scott Schultz	2024-present	Apple TV+	Yo Gabba Gabba LLC	Revival of Yo Gabba Gabba!.

=== Specials ===
Title	Director(s)	Year(s)	Network	Co-production with	Notes
DHX Studios
Carmen Sandiego: To Steal or Not to Steal	Jos Humphrey; Co-directors Kenny Park Mike West	2020	Netflix	HMH Productions; I Can & I Will Productions	Interactive special
WildBrain Studios
Who Are You, Charlie Brown?	Michael Bonfiglio	2021	Apple TV+	Imagine Documentaries; Schulz Studio	Documentary special.
Lego Friends: Holiday Special	William Gordon	2021	YouTube	The Lego Group	Christmas special.
Johnny Test's Ultimate Meatloaf Quest	Jim Miller; Tim Stuby	2021	Netflix		Interactive special
Snoopy Presents: For Auld Lang Syne	Clay Kaytis	2021	Apple TV+	Schulz Studio	New Year's Eve special
Snoopy Presents: It's the Small Things, Charlie Brown	Raymond S. Persi	2022	Apple TV+	Schulz Studio	Earth Day special
Snoopy Presents: To Mom (and Dad), With Love	Clay Kaytis	2022	Apple TV+	Schulz Studio	Mother's Day special
Snoopy Presents: Lucy's School	Raymond S. Persi	2022	Apple TV+	Schulz Studio	Back To School special
Caillou: Rosie the Giant	Greg Richardson	2022	Canada; Family Jr.; United States Peacock		Anti-Bullying Day special
Caillou: Adventures with Grandma and Grandpa	Greg Richardson	2022	Canada; Family Jr.; United States Peacock		Summer vacation special
Caillou: The Bravest Wolf Boy	Greg Richardson	2022	Canada; Family Jr.; United States Peacock		Halloween special
Caillou: The Silver Knight	Greg Richardson	2022	Canada; Family Jr.; United States Peacock		Family Day special
Caillou's Perfect Christmas	Greg Richardson	2022	Canada; Family Jr.; United States Peacock		Christmas special
Snoopy Presents: One-of-a-Kind Marcie	Raymond S. Persi	2023	Apple TV+	Schulz Studio	
Polly Pocket Sparkle Cove Adventure	Brent Bouchard; Thom McKenna	2023	Netflix	Mattel Television	
Strawberry Shortcake and the Beast of Berry Bog	Jim Miller	2023	Canada; Family Jr.; United States; Netflix		Halloween special
Strawberry Shortcake's Perfect Holiday	Jim Miller; Megan Russell	2023	Canada; Family Jr.; United States; Netflix		Christmas special
Strawberry Shortcake's Spring Spectacular	Jim Miller	2024	Canada; Family Jr.; United States; Netflix		
Strawberry Shortcake's Summer Vacation	Jim Miller; Megan Russell	2024	Canada; Family Jr.; United States; Netflix		
Snoopy Presents: Welcome Home, Franklin	Raymond S. Persi	2024	Apple TV+	Schulz Studio	
Snoopy Presents: A Summer Musical	Erik Wiese	2025	Apple TV+	Schulz Studio	
Snoopy Presents: There's No Place Like Home, Snoopy	Ridd Sorensen; Rob Boutilier	2026	Apple TV	Schulz Studio	
The Care Berry Switch	TBA	TBA	TBA	Cloudco Entertainment	Crossover between the Strawberry Shortcake and Care Bears franchises
Little Santa	Peter Baynton	TBA	Apple TV	House of Cool	Adaptation of the Jon Agee book of the same name, featuring music from Bret McKenzie and a script by Martin Hynes.

=== Animated shorts ===
Title	Director(s)	Year(s)	Network	Co-production with	Notes
Lake Erie	John Vassallo	2021			Screened at film festivals
The Philly Specials	Jim Miller	2024		YouTube; Family Channel	Music video and six animated shorts.

=== Feature films ===
Title	Director(s)	Year(s)	Network	Co-production with	Notes
Snoopy Unleashed	Steve Martino	2026	Apple TV	Schulz Studio	

== Former and related studios ==
=== Island of Misfits ===
Island of Misfits
- Formerly: The Halifax Film Company Limited (2004–2006); Halifax Film (2006–2010); DHX Media Halifax (2010–2018)
- Type: Subsidiary
- Industry: Television production
- Predecessor: Salter Street Films
- Founded: May 2004; 22 years ago
- Founders: Michael Donovan; Charles Bishop
- Fate: Merged with Decode Entertainment to form DHX Media; Sold to IoM Media Ventures
- Successor: DHX Media
- Headquarters: Halifax, Nova Scotia, Canada
- Parent: DHX Media (2006–2018); IoM Media Ventures (2018–present)
- Website: halifaxfilm.com (redirects to wildbrain.com) www.iom-media.com

Island of Misfits was originally known as the Halifax Film Company and was established by former Salter Street Films executives Michael Donovan and Charles Bishop in May 2004. Under the name, Halifax Film produced live-action television shows, children's stop-motion series, CGI productions and dramas. It was headed by Nova Scotia Business Inc., which expanded and helped to open up their own new markets, and bought out This Hour Has 22 Minutes from Alliance Atlantis in 2005.

On May 16, 2006, Halifax Film and Decode Entertainment announced that they would merge and thus form the holding company DHX Media. Halifax Film became a subsidiary of DHX Media in the process. It was decided that unlike its predecessor, its main goal was to be on family entertainment. In 2010 all DHX Media subsidiaries including Halifax Film were all merged to form one brand under the DHX Media name.

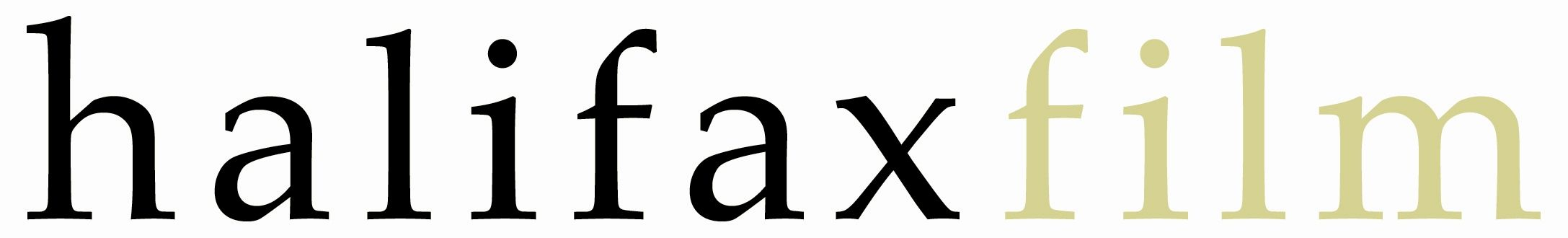
Logo used from 2004 to 2010

In 2014, the studio relocated from a location at Purdy's Wharf to the Park Lane Mall. As of 2019, with the exception of This Hour Has 22 Minutes, DHX Studios Halifax solely produces CGI-animated material.

==== IoM Media Ventures ====
In November 2018, as part of a series of restructurations within the company, DHX sold its Halifax animation studio to IoM Media Ventures, a company led by former DHX CEO Dana Landry. Despite the sale, the studio continues to provide animation for WildBrain-owned shows.

==== Live-action series ====
Title	Creator(s) / Developer(s)	Year(s)	Network	Co-production with	Notes
This Hour Has 22 Minutes	Mary Walsh	2005–present	CBC Television	DHX Media (2006–2018); Canadian Broadcasting Corporation	Seasons 12–25. Produced as Halifax Film Company in season 12, as Halifax Film in seasons 13–17 and as DHX Studios Vancouver in seasons 18–25.
North/South	Floyd Kane	2006	CBC Television		Produced as Halifax Film.
The Guard		2008–2009	Global		Produced as Halifax Film.
That's So Weird!	Jeff Copeland	2009–2012	YTV		Produced as Halifax Film in season 1 and as DHX Studios Halifax in seasons 2 and 3.

==== Animated series ====
Title	Creator(s) / Developer(s)	Years	Network	Co-production with	Notes
Lunar Jim	Alexander Bar	2006–2007	CBC Television	Alliance Atlantis	Produced as Halifax Film.
Bo on the Go!	Jeff Rosen	2007–2011	CBC Television		Produced as Halifax Film.
Animal Mechanicals	Jeff Rosen	2007–2011	CBC Television		Produced as Halifax Film.
The Mighty Jungle	Jason Hopley; Jeff Rosen	2007–2008	CBC Television	Decode Entertainment	Produced as Halifax Film.
Poko	Jeff Rosen; Cheryl Wagner; Michael Donovan	2008	CBC Television	Alliance Atlantis	Season 2. Produced as Halifax Film.
Pirates: Adventures in Art		2010–2011	CBC Television	Privateer II Productions; Decode Entertainment (distributer)	Produced as Halifax Film.
Doozers		2013–2018	Canada Kids' CBC; United States Hulu	The Jim Henson Company	
Inspector Gadget		2015–2018	Teletoon (2015); Family Channel (2017–18)	DHX Media	
Wishenpoof!	Angela Santomero	2015	Amazon Prime Video	Out of the Blue Enterprises; Amazon Studios	
Super Why!	Angela Santomero; Samantha Freeman Alpert; Wendy Harris; Traci Paige Johnson; Jennifer Twomey; Dr. Alice Wilder	2015–2016	Canada CBC Kids; United States PBS Kids	Out of the Blue Enterprises	Season 3.
Space Ranger Roger		2017			
Bob the Builder	Keith Chapman	2017–2018	Canada Family Jr.; United Kingdom Channel 5	Mattel Creations	Animation services for season 3 as IoM Media Ventures Halifax.
Fireman Sam	Rob Lee; Dave Gingell; Dave Jones	2017–present	Channel 5	Mattel Television	Season 11 onward. Produced as DHX Studios Halifax in season 11. Animation services from season 12 onward as Island of Misfits.

==== Animated shorts ====
Title	Director(s)	Year(s)	Network	Co-production with	Notes
Slugterra: Ascension	Don Urquhart	2022	Family Channel	Epic Story Media	Sequel to the NerdCorps/DHX Studios Vancouver series.

==== Films ====
Title	Year	Co-production with	Distributed by	Notes
Shake Hands with the Devil	2007	Barna-Alper Productions; Head Gear Films; Seville Productions	Seville Pictures	

=== DHX Media Los Angeles ===
On September 14, 2010, DHX acquired the Los Angeles-based WildBrain Entertainment. At an undisclosed point, the studio was renamed to DHX Media Los Angeles. In 2013, DHX moved its work for hire productions from the location to its Canadian operations. The studio was shuttered in 2017.

=== DHX Media Toronto ===
DHX Media Toronto
- Final logo as Decode Entertainment, used from 1999 to 2010
- Formerly: Decode Entertainment, Inc. (1997–2010)
- Type: In-name-only unit of WildBrain
- Industry: Television production
- Founded: February 27, 1997; 29 years ago
- Founders: Steven DeNure; Neil Court; John Delmage
- Defunct: 2010; 16 years ago (as Decode Entertainment, Inc.); October 15, 2011; 14 years ago (as DHX Media Toronto)
- Fate: Folded into DHX Media
- Successor: DHX Media
- Headquarters: Toronto, Ontario, Canada
- Parent: DHX Media (2006–2011)
- Website: decode.tv (archived 2007-05-31) decode-ent.com (archived 2011-02-28) dhxmedia.com

DHX Media Toronto was founded on February 27, 1997, and originally known as Decode Entertainment, Inc. by Steven DeNure, Neil Court, and John Delmage, and it was based in Toronto, Ontario. The company produced numerous television shows and was an international supplier of television and interactive programming for children and youth. Decode Entertainment focused on traditional animation, computer-generated animation, and live-action shows. The name "Decode" is an acronym of the combination of the names DeNure, Court, and Delmage.

On May 16, 2006, Decode Entertainment and Halifax Film announced that they would merge and thus form the holding company DHX Media. Decode Entertainment became a subsidiary of DHX Media in the process, distributing Halifax Film shows and other DHX properties. In 2010 all DHX Media subsidiaries including Decode Entertainment were rebranded under the DHX Media name.

By 2011, DHX Media ceased production on producing content at the ex-Decode offices. The company known as Epitome Pictures, which DHX acquired in 2014, assumed the name of DHX Studios Toronto in 2016, but it has no relation outside the name.

==== Live-action series ====
Title	Creator(s) / Developer(s)	Years	Network	Co-production with	Notes
Our Hero	John May; Suzanne Bolch	2000–2002	CBC Television	Heroic Film Company	
The Zack Files	Kathy Slevin	2000–2002	YTV		
The Hoobs	Jocelyn Stevenson; Brian Henson	2001–2003	Channel 4	The Jim Henson Company	
Be the Creature	Chris Kratt; Martin Kratt	2003–2004	National Geographic Channel	Kratt Brothers Company Limited	
Radio Free Roscoe	Will McRobb; Douglas McRobb	2003–2005	Canada Family Channel; United States The N		
Naturally, Sadie	Barbara Wiechmann; Suzanne Bolch; John May	2005–2007	Canada Family Channel; United States Disney Channel		
The Adrenaline Project		2007–2008	YTV	Marblemedia	Distribution only.
The Latest Buzz	Brent Piaskoski	2007–2010	Family Channel		
Grandpa in My Pocket	Mellie Buse and Jan Page	2009–2010	CBeebies	Adastra Creative Ltd.	Distribution only.
Waybuloo	Dan Good	2009–2014	Canada Treehouse TV; United Kingdom CBeebies	The Foundation	Live-action/animated series. Produced as Decode Entertainment in season 1 and as DHX Media Toronto in seasons 2–4.
How to Be Indie	Vera Santamaria; Suzanne Bolch; John May	2009–2011	YTV	Heroic Film Company; Sudden Storm Entertainment	Produced as Decode Entertainment in season 1 and as DHX Media Toronto in season 2.

==== Animated series ====
Title	Creator(s) / Developer(s)	Years	Network	Co-production with	Notes
Freaky Stories	Steve Schnier; John A. Delmage	1997–2000	Canada YTV; United States Fox Family	Funbag Animation Studios; Sound Venture Productions (seasons 2–3); Vujade Entertainment; Big Time Talking Pictures	
Angela Anaconda	Joanna Ferone; Sue Rose	1999–2001	Canada Teletoon; United States Fox Family	C.O.R.E.	
Watership Down		1999–2001	Canada YTV; United Kingdom CITV	Nepenthe Productions; Alltime Entertainment	
Weird-Ohs	Bill Campbell	1999–2000	Canada YTV; United States Fox Family	Mainframe Entertainment; EM.TV & Merchandising AG; Testors Corporation	
Rainbow Fish		2000	Canada Teletoon; Germany ZDF; United States HBO Family	Sport 1 Medien; EM.TV & Merchandising AG; Sony Wonder Television	
Undergrads	Pete Williams; Josh A. Cagan	2001	Canada Teletoon; United States MTV	MTV Animation; Funbag Animation Studios	
Olliver's Adventures	Edward Kay	2002–2005	Teletoon	Collideascope Digital Productions	
Girlstuff/Boystuff	Ruth Beni; Alan Silbering	2002–2005	YTV	Agogo Media; AE, Ltd.	
The Blobheads	Howard Busgang	2003-2004	Canada CBC Television; United Kingdom Nickelodeon UK	Wark Clements Studios; Gallus Entertainment; Absolute Studios	
King	Gordon Coulthart; Mary Crawford; Alan Templeton	2003–2005	Family Channel	Funbag Animation Studios	
The Save-Ums!	Dan Clark; Don Asher	2003–2006	Canada CBC Television; United States Discovery Kids	The Dan Clark Company; C.O.R.E.	
Franny's Feet	Cathy Moss; Susin Nielsen	2003–2010	Canada Family Channel; United Kingdom Five	WNET; C.O.R.E.	
Bromwell High	Anil Gupta; Richard Osman; Richard Pinto	2005	Canada Teletoon; United Kingdom Channel 4	Hat Trick Productions	
Delilah & Julius	Suzanne Chapman; Steven JP Comeau; Lienne Sawatsky; Daniel Williams	2005–2008	Teletoon	Collideascope Digital Productions	
Planet Sketch		2005–2007	Canada Teletoon; United Kingdom CITV	Aardman Animations	
Dudson's Modern Tales		2006			
The Naughty Naughty Pets	Wendy Ann Gardner	2006	CBC Television	C.O.R.E.	
Super Why!	Angela Santomero; Samantha Freeman Alpert; Wendy Harris; Traci Paige Johnson; Jennifer Twomey; Dr. Alice Wilder	2007–2012	Canada CBC Kids; United States PBS Kids	Out of the Blue Enterprises	Seasons 1 and 2.
Urban Vermin	Diana Arruda; Tim Thompson	2007–2008	YTV		
Chop Socky Chooks	Sergio Delfino	2007–2008	Canada; Teletoon; United Kingdom; Cartoon Network	Aardman Animations	
Clang Invasion	Seng Choon Meng; Doug Hadders; Adam Rothstein	2009–2010	YTV	Scrawl Studios; AGOGO Entertainment Ltd.	
Dirtgirlworld	Cate McQuillen; Hewey Eustace	2009–2011	Australia ABC Kids; Canada CBC Television; United Kingdom CBeebies	Mememe Productions	
PoppetsTown	Katherine Sangford	2009–2011	Knowledge Network; TVOKids	Neptuno Films	

=== DHX Studios Toronto ===
In 2016, Epitome Pictures was rebranded as DHX Studios Toronto (no relation to the animation studio of the same name). The company produced live-action shows.

In 2019, DHX sold off the building, ceasing operations at the Toronto studio in the process.

== See also ==
- WildBrain Spark
- Studio B Productions
- WildBrain Entertainment
- Cookie Jar Group
- Ragdoll Productions
- Epitome Pictures
- Nerd Corps Entertainment
- Iconix Brand Group
