= University Games Corporation =

American board game manufacturer

University Games
- Industry: Board Games, Puzzles, Crafts and learning toys]
- Founded: April 1985; 41 years ago
- Founder: Bob Moog and Cris Lehman
- Headquarters: San Francisco, California, United States
- Website: UniversityGames.com

University Games Corporation is an American game company, based in San Francisco, California.

The company was founded on April 1, 1985, by Alva Robert (Bob) Moog and Cris Lehman. It has developed and manufactured over 500 games since.

The first product released by the company was Murder Mystery Party, and it generated $385,000 in 1985. In 1986 and 1987, the company expanded its product line by adding more games including Twenty Questions. Twenty Questions (invented by Bob Moog and Scott Mednick) became the flagship game for University Games in the 1980s and early 1990s. It led to the company's first licensing deals with Pressman Toy acquiring US and Canada rights and Milton Bradley UK (a division of Hasbro) acquiring European rights to the game.

University Games has six US divisions: University Games (board games), Great Explorations (novelties/science and learning/glow in the dark products), BePuzzled (puzzles), Front Porch Classics, UCreate and Spinner Books (books that you read and play). A seventh division, Colorforms (travel, floor puzzles/vinyl stick-on play sets, board games), was sold in September 2014 to Out of the Blue Enterprises.

The company's products include:

- Murder Mystery Party
- Where in the World is Carmen Sandiego?
- Kids on Stage
- Totally Gross
- 20 Questions
- Eric Carle Learning System
- Five Little Monkey
- Super WHY!
- Front Porch Classics
- 3D Crystal Puzzles.

In 2011, University Games became the exclusive USA distributor of Hanayama co, LTD's cast metal brainteaser puzzles (Huzzle), and in 2012 became the exclusive North American distributor of the Original 3D Crystal Puzzles line.

In 2014, University Games received rights from Disney to use some of their characters on a 3D puzzle line. On December 21, 2023, University Games acquired The Learning Journey.
