= Brown Bag Films =

Irish animation studio

Brown Bag Films UC.
- Logo used since 2026
- Type: Division
- Industry: Animation
- Founded: 1994; 32 years ago
- Founders: Cathal Gaffney; Darragh O'Connell
- Headquarters: Unit 20, Block C, Smithfield Market, Smithfield, Dublin 7, D07 PV06, Ireland
- Number of locations: 4 (2020)
- Area served: Worldwide
- Key people: Darragh O'Connell (Creative Director); Gillian Higgins (Head of TV Production); Jennie Stacey (Director of Production Development)
- Parent: 9 Story Media Group (2015–present)
- Divisions: Brown Bag Films Bali; Brown Bag Films Dublin
- Website: brownbagfilms.com

Brown Bag Films UC. (BBF) is an Irish animation studio owned by Canadian media company 9 Story Media Group and based in Dublin, with 2D and 3D animation facilities in Bali, Los Angeles, Toronto, and formerly Manchester.

Founded in 1994 by Cathal Gaffney and Darragh O'Connell, the studio is well known for the production of computer-animated television series and short films, including Give Up Yer Aul Sins and Granny O'Grimm's Sleeping Beauty. The studio has garnered a number of awards, including Academy Award nominations for Give Up Yer Aul Sins (Best Animated Short Film at the 73rd Academy Awards) and Granny O'Grimm's Sleeping Beauty (Best Animated Short Film at the 83rd Academy Awards), 6 Emmy Awards for Peter Rabbit, an Emmy award for Bing and a number of BAFTA, Emmy and Annie Award nominations for their shows; Octonauts, Doc McStuffins, Henry Hugglemonster, and Vampirina.

== History ==
=== Independent era (1994–2015) ===
Brown Bag Films was established in 1994 by Cathal Gaffney and Darragh O'Connell, producing their first series Peig for RTÉ using hand-painted acetate celluloids shot on 35mm film. In 1995, the studio moved to an old Georgian house off Gardiner Street, producing a few commercials and illustrations. Wolves, Witches and Giants was created in 1996 for ITV Studios.

The studio moved to new premises in Dublin city centre in 1997, establishing Ireland's first digital ink-and-paint workstation. They worked on the Morgan Creek Productions feature film The King & I, coordinating European animation with LA via the a 56K modem. Barstool and Taxi were produced for RTÉ and they began to grow their commercials service.

In 1998, Brown Bag Films produced the series "Why?" for RTÉ which sold in over 100 countries worldwide.

In 1999, Brown Bag Films released their short film The Last Elk, directed by Alan Shannon. The film went on to win numerous international awards.

In 2002, Brown Bag Films was nominated for its first Oscar, Give Up Yer Aul Sins, directed by Gaffney and produced by O'Connell and the company grew to a staff of 22.

In July 2007, Brown Bag Films moved to a new studio in Smithfield Square, Dublin, designed by Douglas Wallace Architects, and began production on their first animated series, Olivia, for Nickelodeon. In the same year development began on Noddy in Toyland.

In 2008, the studio began working on Granny O'Grimm's Sleeping Beauty, directed by Nicky Phelan, landing a second Academy Award (Oscar) nomination.

In 2009, Brown Bag Films delivered 20 hours of animation to international broadcasters and was awarded European Producer of the Year at Cartoon Tributes, Norway. The studio has grown to more than 160 people and is equipped with a high-definition picture and 5:1 audio post production facility.

In July 2010, the company established an office in Los Angeles to produce animated feature films.

In 2011, they premiered Darragh O'Connell's short film, "23 Degrees, 5 Minutes", voiced by John Hurt. They began production on Doc McStuffins – the first show commissioned by newly re-branded Disney Junior which it would premiere on alongside Disney Channel. The Octonauts was nominated for a BAFTA award. Brown Bag Films began production on their own original series, Henry Hugglemonster, based on a book by Niamh Sharkey, for Disney Junior.

In December of that year, Brown Bag Films strike a deal with Sydney-based Australian animation & live-action production company Sticky Pictures and digital design studio Kyla May Production to jointly develop and produce a tween animated comedy series called Dream Factory created by Kyla May that follows dream-maker Tommy Winks working in the dream-making studio in the clouds called the Dream Factory with Brown Bag Films' Dublin-based animation studio and Sticky Pictures' Sydney-based animation studio would handle animation for the series.

On 23 March 2012, the premiere of Doc McStuffins broke rating records for the most watched preschool premiere ever in the United States. Brown Bag Films continue production on it as well as Henry Hugglemonster following Disney Junior's announcement of their series renewals and a second season of the Octonauts, and are joined by a very special new staff member – Toby the Studio Dog.

In 2013, Brown Bag Films began production on a short film ANYA, made to raise awareness for the charity To Russia With Love. Brown Bag Films recruit 30 new staff and expand the studio into a third premises.

In February 2014, Brown Bag Films announced a television series adaptation of the Bing book series by author and illustrator Ted Dewan. Following series renewals by the host TV networks, they continued production on a second season of Henry Hugglemonster and Peter Rabbit, a third season of Doc McStuffins and a fourth season of The Octonauts. Brown Bag Films launched Brown Bag Labs, an online space for behind-the-scenes fun and tutorials from the studio. Octonauts was awarded with an IFTA for Best Children's Programme. ANYA was released online to raise funds for To Russia With Love charity. They announce the opening of their 2D studio in Manchester. Their short film An Ode To Love is awarded Best Irish Animation at Foyle Film Festival. They release the Christmas Special episode of their new online series Trouble in Paradise.

In January 2015, their pilot episode of The Stinky and Dirty Show, based on the 'I Stink!' book series by Kate and Jim McMullan, debuted on Amazon Prime (now Amazon Prime Video) and was later greenlit for a full series. Bing is awarded for Best Writing in a Children's TV Episode by The Writer's Guild of Great Britain. Doc McStuffins received an award for Outstanding Children's Program at the 46th NAACP Image Awards and a Peabody Award at the 74th Annual Peabody Awards.

=== 9 Story Media Group subsidiary (2015–2024) ===
Brown Bag Films was bought by 9 Story Media Group on 18 August 2015 as a way of "re-introducing CGI animation to 9 Story" after "a failed first-attempt implementation", according to its president, Vincent "Vince" Commisso. On 7 March 2016, they began work on a computer-animated series for Disney Junior, Vampirina, based on the Vampirina Ballerina series of children's books written by Anne Marie Pace and illustrated by LeUyen Pham which debuted on 1 October 2017.

In October 2017, more than two years after Brown Bag was bought, it became one of 9 Story's two main divisions alongside 9 Story Distribution International, taking over all 2D and 3D animation across 9 Story's studios in Dublin, Manchester and Toronto. 9 Story also renamed its two animation studios in Bali (formerly BASE Animation Studios) and its base in Toronto after Brown Bag Films.

=== Scholastic era (2024–present) ===
In 2024, the studio alongside the rest of 9 Story, became part of American publishing company, Scholastic. In 2026, Cathal Gaffney left the studio after 32 years.

== Awards ==
At the 2014 Daytime Emmy Awards, Brown Bag Films bagged three awards and scored another five nominations for the series Peter Rabbit, earning the most nominations for an animated show that year.

== Filmography ==
=== Television ===
Title	Years	Network	Notes
Wobblyland	2007–08	Nick Jr.	co-production with HIT Entertainment; Owned by Mattel Studios
Olivia	2008–10	Nickelodeon	co-production with Chorion Limited; Owned by DreamWorks Animation
Noddy in Toyland	2009	Five	co-production with Chorion Limited; Owned by DreamWorks Animation
Octonauts	2010–present	CBeebies	co-production with Silvergate Media; Owned by Sony Pictures Television
Doc McStuffins	2012–20	Disney Jr.	
Peter Rabbit	2012–16	CBeebies; Nickelodeon (United States)	co-production with Silvergate Media; Owned by Sony Pictures Television
Henry Hugglemonster	2013–15	Disney Jr.	
The Stinky & Dirty Show	2015–19	Amazon Prime Video	co-production with Amazon Studios; Owned by Amazon MGM Studios Distribution
Bing	2014–19	CBeebies	co-production with Acamar Films and Tandem Films
Sonic Boom	2016–17	Boomerang (TV network) (United States); Canal J/Gulli (France)	co-production with Sega of America, Technicolor Animation Productions, Lagardère Thématiques and Jeunesse TV; second season only, owned by Sega
Nella the Princess Knight	2017–21	Nickelodeon/Nick Jr. Channel/Paramount+	co-production with Nickelodeon Animation Studio
Vampirina	2017–21	Disney Jr.	
Butterbean's Cafe	2018–20	Nickelodeon/Nick Jr. Channel	co-production with Nickelodeon Animation Studio
Let's Go Luna!	2018–22	PBS Kids; TVOKids (Canada)	co-production with 9 Story Media Group
Sadie Sparks	2019	Disney Channel; Disney Channel France (France)	co-production with Cyber Group Studios
Xavier Riddle and the Secret Museum	2019–26	PBS Kids	co-production with 9 Story Media Group
Blue's Clues & You!	2019–24	Nickelodeon/Nick Jr. Channel/YouTube; Treehouse TV (Canada)	co-production with 9 Story Media Group and Nickelodeon Animation Studio; Owned by Skydance Corporation
Powerbirds	2020	Universal Kids	co-production with Sprout Media Productions; Owned by NBCUniversal Global Distribution
Chico Bon Bon: Monkey with a Tool Belt	2020	Netflix	co-production with Silvergate Media; Owned by Sony Pictures Television
Ridley Jones	2021–23	Netflix	co-production with Netflix Animation Studios and Laughing Wild
Ada Twist, Scientist	2021–23	Netflix	co-production with Netflix Animation Studios, Higher Ground Productions, Laughing Wild and Wonder Worldwide
Karma's World	2021–22	Netflix	co-production with 9 Story Media Group and Karma's World Entertainment
Eureka!	2022–23	Disney Jr.	
Sago Mini Friends	2022–2024	Apple TV+	co-production with Spin Master Entertainment
Rosie's Rules	2022–present	PBS Kids; TVOKids (Canada)	co-production with 9 Story Media Group
Lu & the Bally Bunch	2023	Cartoonito; CBC Kids (Canada)	co-production with 9 Story Media Group
Eva the Owlet	2023–25	Apple TV+	co-production with Scholastic Entertainment
A Kind of Spark	2023–24	CBBC; BYU TV (United States)	season 2 onwards co-production with 9 Story Media Group and LS Productions
Dee & Friends in Oz	2024	Netflix	co-production with 9 Story Media Group
Dylan's Playtime Adventures	2024–present	Cartoonito; CBC Kids (Canada)	co-production with Scholastic Entertainment
RoboGobo	2025–present	Disney Jr.	
Dr. Seuss' Horton!	2025–present	Netflix	co-production with Dr. Seuss Enterprises and Netflix Animation Studios
Thomas & Friends: Railway Stories	2026–present	YouTube/Netflix	co-production with Mattel Studios and HIT Entertainment
Super Why's Comic Book Adventures	2026–present	PBS Kids	co-production with 9 Story Media Group
Sam Witch	2026	Disney Jr.	In development
Clifford the Big Red Dog	2027	PBS Kids	co-production with Scholastic Entertainment and 9 Story Media Group; in development
Dragon Girls	TBA	TBA	co-production with 9 Story Media Group; in development
Harry and His Bucket Full of Dinosaurs	TBA	TBA	In development

=== Film ===
Title	Release date	Distributor	Notes
Angela's Christmas	November 30, 2018	Netflix	co-production with 9 Story Media Group
Angela's Christmas Wish	December 1, 2020	Netflix	co-production with 9 Story Media Group
Blue's Big City Adventure	November 18, 2022	Paramount+	co-production with Nickelodeon Movies, Nickelodeon Animation Studio, 9 Story Media Group, Boxel Animation and Line by Line Media
The Sneetches	November 3, 2025	Netflix	co-production with Dr. Seuss Enterprises and Netflix Animation Studios

== See also ==
- List of animation studios
- Academy Award for Animated Short Film
