= Deborah Reber =

American writer

Deborah Reber is a young adult fiction and non-fiction writer. She previously worked in children's television. She is the author of several books, including the recently published In Their Shoes. She also contributes to the teen self-help series Chicken Soup for the Teenage Soul: The Real Deal. Deborah lives with her husband and son in Seattle, Washington.

== Bibliography ==
- Chill, 2008, ISBN 1-4169-5526-7
- In Their Shoes, 2007, ISBN 1-4169-2578-3
- It's My Life: The Guide to Friendship, 2007, ISBN 1-931843-58-9
- Chicken Soup for the Teenage Soul: The Real Deal Challenges: Stories about Disses, Losses, Messes, Stresses & More, 2006
- Chicken Soup for the Teenage Soul: The Real Deal Friends, 2005
- Run for Your Life: A Book for Beginning Women Runners, 2005
- Chicken Soup for the Teenage Soul : The Real Deal School, 2005
- Blue un día de lluvia (Blue's Best Rainy Day), 2005, ISBN 1-4169-0068-3
- Blue en busca de huevos (Blue's Egg Hunt), 2004, ISBN 0-689-86650-X
- Bold Ink, 2003, ISBN 0-9741251-0-5
- Blue’s Clues: Magenta Gets Glasses, 2002, ISBN 0-689-84745-9
- Blue’s Clues: ABC Detective Game, 2002, ISBN 0-689-84346-1
- Blue’s Clues: Guess Who Loves Blue!, 2002, ISBN 0-689-84870-6
- Blue’s Clues: My Pet Turtle, 2001, ISBN 0-689-84186-8
- Blue’s Clues: Blue’s Egg Hunt, 2001, ISBN 0-689-83873-5
- Blue’s Clues: My Favorite Letters, 2001, ISBN 0-689-83797-6
- Blue’s Clues: Blue’s Best Rainy Day, 2000, ISBN 0-689-83279-6
- Blue’s Clues: Magenta and Me, 2000, ISBN 0-689-83123-4
- Blue’s Clues: Blue’s Valentine’s Day, 2000, ISBN 0-689-83062-9
- Blue’s Clues: Weather Games with Blue, 1999, ISBN 0-689-82949-3
