= Granny O'Grimm's Sleeping Beauty =

- Directed by: Nicky Phelan
- Written by: Kathleen O'Rourke
- Produced by: Darragh O'Connell
- Starring: Kathleen O'Rourke
- Production company: Brown Bag Films
- Release date: 2008
- Running time: 6 minutes
- Country: Ireland

Granny O'Grimm's Sleeping Beauty is a six-minute-long animated socially satirical black comedy short film written by Kathleen O'Rourke, directed by Nicky Phelan and produced by Darragh O'Connell of Brown Bag Films in 2008. The plot centers on Granny O'Grimm, a seemingly sweet old lady, who loses the plotline as she tells her own version of Sleeping Beauty to her terrified granddaughter. In 2010, the short was nominated for the Academy Award for Best Animated Short Film at the 82nd Academy Awards but lost to Logorama.

== Production ==
Granny O'Grimm's started life as a character in a sketch in The Fallen Angels Cabaret, a comedy show in which creator Kathleen O'Rourke was involved. There it was developed and performed, development continuing later with John Walsh and Kathleen. Director Nicky Phelan saw Granny O'Grimm's potential as an animated character, and with Brown Bag Films, production began in 2008. Kathleen O'Rourke reprised her role to voice the character in the short film. The film received funding from the Irish Film Board, RTÉ, and the Arts Council through the ‘Frameworks’ scheme. It has received 11 national and international awards, including the Newport Beach Film Festival (Outstanding Achievement in Short Films), Cinegael Montreal (Audience Award, Best Short), and the Heart of Gold Film Festival, Australia (Best Comedy).

== Awards and nominations ==
In January 2010, the film's director, Nicky Phelan, and producer, Darragh O'Connell, were nominated for Academy Award for Best Animated Short Film at the 82nd Academy Awards, ending up losing to Logorama. It was also included in the Animation Show of Shows.
