= Super Why! =

Animated preschool children's television series

- Genre: Preschool; Superhero; Educational; Adventure
- Created by: Angela Santomero
- Developed by: Angela Santomero; Samantha Freeman Alpert
- Voices of: Nicholas Castel Vanderburgh; Johnny Orlando; Zachary Bloch; Samuel Faraci; Siera Florindo; T.J. McGibbon; Tajja Isen; Jo Vannicola
- Theme music composer: Steve D'Angelo; Terry Tompkins
- Opening theme: "Who's Got the Power?"
- Ending theme: "Hip Hip Hooray" (Instrumental, S1–2); "Super Readers to the Rescue" (Instrumental, S3)
- Composers: Steve D'Angelo (entire run); Terry Tompkins (entire run); Lorenzo Castelli (S3); Jeff Morrow (S3)
- Countries of origin: Canada; United States
- Original language: English
- No. of seasons: 3
- No. of episodes: 103 (list of episodes)

Production
- Executive producers: Angela C. Santomero; Samantha Freeman Alpert; Steven DeNure; Anne Loi (S2–3)
- Running time: 26 minutes
- Production companies: DHX Media Toronto (S1–S2) (Note: Known as Decode Entertainment for the first season.); DHX Media Halifax (S3); Out of the Blue Enterprises

Original release
- Network: PBS Kids (United States); PBS Kids Sprout (United States); CBC Kids (Canada)
- Release: September 3, 2007 – May 12, 2016

Super Why! is an animated superhero preschool educational children's television series created by Angela Santomero and developed by Santomero and Samantha Freeman Alpert for PBS Kids. Santomero and Alpert additionally serve as executive producers alongside Steven DeNure and Anne Loi. The series was produced by Santomero and Alpert's New York City-based production company Out of the Blue Enterprises in co-production with DHX Media Toronto for the first and second seasons and DHX Media Halifax for the third season. Animation was by Toronto-based C.O.R.E. Toons (for season 1), Gallus Entertainment (for season 2) and DHX Media (originally through its Decode Entertainment division for season 3). The opening and closing theme songs were written by composers and lyricists Steve D'Angelo and Terry Tompkins, with D'Angelo also providing lead vocals for both. The background score for seasons 2 and 3 was composed by Lorenzo Castelli and Jeff Morrow.

The show was originally created as a stop motion pilot episode in 1999 by Cuppa Coffee Animation that was pitched to Nick Jr. It was later featured at the 2000 Annecy Film Festival. Nickelodeon ultimately opted not to pick up the show. Instead, Curious Pictures pitched another pilot to PBS Kids sometime in 2006, and PBS Kids further developed the series with funds from the United States Department of Education's Ready to Learn grant and aired the premiere episode on September 3, 2007. The original run ended on May 12, 2016 with a total of 103 episodes across three seasons.

== Overview ==
The show is set in Storybrook Village, which is accessible through a panel that is represented by an invisible question mark located on a bookshelf in a library. The titular character, Whyatt Beanstalk, lives with his friends Woofster, Littlest Pig, Red Riding Hood, and Princess Pea. In each of the episodes, one of the main characters (sometimes two characters, or even all five) has a "super big problem", a "super big question", or a "super big mystery". The main characters then discuss their situation at a secret clubhouse known as the "Book Club", agreeing to transform into their superhero identities and fly into a book, randomly selected by Princess Pea, with a storyline similar to their own predicament.

The goal of the Super Readers is to follow the storyline of the book. As they progress through the events of the story, they encounter various obstacles, which can be solved by applying their literacy skills to change the story. As they overcome each of these obstacles, they are rewarded with red glittery "Super Letters" that form the "Super Story Answer", the solution to whatever scenario they are investigating.

At the conclusion of the adventure, the Super Readers fly back to the Book Club. The Super Letters are put onto the giant computer screen and are spelled out to show the Super Story Answer. Then, one of the Super Readers gives the reason why that particular word or phrase serves as the solution to their issue or mystery.

== Episodes ==
| Season | Episodes | | Originally released | |
| Season | Episodes | | First released | Last released |
|---|---|---|---|---|
| 1 | 65 | 29 | September 3, 2007 | May 22, 2008 |
| 1 | 65 | 22 | September 1, 2008 | August 24, 2009 |
| 1 | 65 | 14 | November 9, 2009 | November 15, 2010 |
| 2 | 15 | | September 12, 2011 | October 11, 2012 |
| 3 | 23 | | August 17, 2015 | May 12, 2016 |

== Characters ==
The original four Super Readers (from left to right: Alpha Pig, Princess Presto, Wonder Red, and Super Why)

- Whyatt Beanstalk/Super Why (voiced by Nicholas Castel Vanderburgh in the first season, Nicholas Kaegi in the second season, Johnny Orlando in the third season) is the leader of the Super Readers. He is the younger brother of Jack, the protagonist of the English folktale of the same name, and lives with his parents Mr. and Mrs. Beanstalk, who write and illustrate stories together, along with his baby sister, Joy. Jack is usually away at college, appearing in a handful of episodes. Whyatt has "the power to read", which focuses on writing, vocabulary, and grammar, and a "Why Writer" that "writes" words.
- Littlest Pig/Alpha Pig (voiced by Zachary Bloch in the first and second seasons, Samuel Faraci in the third season) is the youngest of the Three Little Pigs, who is usually known as simply "Pig." He enjoys pretending and dressing up like his father, who is a construction worker. Pig has "alphabet power", which focuses on the alphabet (specifically recognizing the letters by name), as well as a toolbox with various equipment in it.
- Little Red Riding Hood/Wonder Red (voiced by Siera Florindo in the first and second seasons, T.J. McGibbon in the third season) is the eponymous character of the fairy tale, though she is only referred to as "Red Riding Hood". She has "word power", which focuses on letter sounds, rhyming, and word families like "OP", "AT", "UN", "UMP", "OG", etc., and a "Wonder Words Basket" full of words.
- Princess Pea/Princess Presto (voiced by Tajja Isen) was named after the children's story "The Princess and the Pea", and her parents are the prince and princess from the story. She has "spelling power", which focuses on spelling, and a "Magic Spelling Wand" which allows her to write/spell words.
- Puppy/Woofster (voiced by Jo Vannicola) is the Beanstalk family's pet dog. He has "dictionary power", based on vocabulary, which allows him to find the meaning of any word.
- Super You is the nickname given to the television viewer, who the Super Readers refer to directly. Super You can also "help" the Super Readers in various ways. In Season 1, Super You was included in the transformation sequence, with "the power to help".

== Reception ==
Super Why! was received positively on Common Sense Media, where reviewer Emily Ashby rates the show 4/5 in the categories positive messages, positive role models, and educational value. Ashby's review additionally states while extremely mild sequences of suspense and peril do occur and how the show partnered with Post Consumer Brands for a branded cereal, there are low amounts of violence/scariness and consumerism, as well as no sexual content, profanity, or drinking, drugs, and smoking. Ashby additionally credits the merit of the show to its usage of classic children's fairy tales and the usage of characters from them, specifically the Three Little Pigs.

Susan Stewart, a reviewer for The New York Times, criticized the show for taking classic fairy tales with traditionally dark lessons, specifically The Three Little Pigs and Hansel and Gretel, and morphing them into etiquette lessons. Stewart also criticized the use of interactive questions for viewers to answer and their length, specifically questions like "what comes after the letter E?". Despite stating these flaws, Stewart agreed that the show is brilliant in educational value.

== Promotions and other media ==
=== Live show ===
In 2012, a live show was launched across the United States, titled Super Why Live: You've Got the Power. Produced by S2BN Entertainment, directed by Glenn Orsher, and written by Orsher, Angela C. Santomero, Samantha Freeman Alpert, and Becky Friedman, Super Why Live was promoted for having aerial stunts and "cutting-edge technology", and due to its high levels of audience engagement, was jokingly referred to by Santomero as "'the Rocky Horror Picture Show' for preschoolers". The show, which follows Super Why, Alpha Pig, Wonder Red, Princess Presto, and Woofster, premiered in Monroe, Louisiana on July 18, 2012, and toured into spring 2013, where the tour concluded in Albany, New York on May 10. The show featured the pre-recorded voices of Melissa Hutchison as Super Why and Woofster, Charlie Ibsen as Alpha Pig, Lisa Marie Woods as Wonder Red, and Christina Ulloa Purrelli as Princess Presto.

The live show's soundtrack was written and produced by musician and singer-songwriter Jack Antonoff, and borrows elements from the series' songs written by Santomero, Alpert, composers Steve D'Angelo and Terry Tompkins, and lyricist and staff writer Alex Breen. Antonoff, widely known for his work with the indie rock band Fun, noted that being natively skilled in indie rock, writing for the show was not very different, though the lyrics needed to be much less open to interpretation and easy to understand when composing for a young audience.

=== Spin-off series ===
A short-form 2D spin-off reboot series titled Super Why's Comic Book Adventures premiered on PBS Kids on October 18, 2023, with 20 three-minute episodes. A preview of the series was released on September 20, 2023. This series introduces a new Super Reader named Power Paige.

On October 1, 2025, it was announced that Super Why's Comic Book Adventures would be expanded into a full half-hour series. It debuted on PBS Kids on October 5, 2026.
