= List of Blue's Clues episodes =

Blue's Clues is an American live-action/animated educational children's television series that premiered on Nickelodeon on September 8, 1996. Producers Angela Santomero, Todd Kessler, and Traci Paige Johnson combined concepts from child development and early-childhood education with innovative animation and production techniques that helped their viewers learn. It was hosted originally by Steve Burns, who left in 2002 and was replaced by Donovan Patton. The show follows an animated blue-spotted dog named Blue as she leaves a treasure hunt for the host and the viewers. Blue's Clues became the highest-rated show for preschoolers on American commercial television and was critical to Nickelodeon's growth. It has been called "one of the most successful, critically acclaimed, and ground-breaking preschool television series of all time."

During the course of the series, 143 episodes of Blue's Clues aired over six seasons.

== Series overview ==
Season	Episodes	Originally released	
Season	Episodes	First released	Last released
Pilot		1994	
1	19	September 8, 1996	October 27, 1997
2	21	November 3, 1997	February 15, 1999
3	32	March 14, 1999	January 13, 2002
4	24	April 9, 2001	August 1, 2006
5	36	April 30, 2002	December 12, 2003
6	11	February 8, 2004	August 6, 2006

== Episodes ==
=== Pilot (1994) ===
Title	Recording date
"Blue Prints"	1994
A prototype version of what would later become the first episode of Blue's Clues. Steve wears a red shirt, the animation is choppier and some dialogue is missing. The pilot was leaked online onto YouTube on September 9, 2023, and was taken down by Paramount Global shortly after.

=== Season 1 (1996–97) ===
No. overall	No. in season	Title	Directed by	Written by	Original release date	Prod. code	U.S. households (in millions)
1	1	"Snack Time"	Todd Kessler	Angela C. Santomero	September 8, 1996	101	N/A
Steve has to figure out what Blue wants with her snack. Steve, Blue and the viewers also recognize colors while painting elephants, identify the shapes of four groceries, and match chicks on a farm. This episode was remade for Blue's Clues & You! as "Meet Josh!".
2	2	"What Time Is It for Blue?"	John Chiapparde	P. Kevin Strader & Angela C. Santomero	September 16, 1996	102	N/A
Steve has to figure out what comes after cleanup time. Steve, Blue and the viewers also put Tickety Tock back together, complete patterns in Steve's closet, and help the Lion Prince locate his friends visually and through sounds.
3	3	"Mailbox's Birthday"	Michael T. Holman	Angela C. Santomero	September 23, 1996	103	N/A
Steve has to figure out what Mailbox's birthday party game is. Steve, Blue and the viewers also complete sprinkle patterns on Mailbox's birthday cake and wrap a good present for him.
4	4	"Blue's Story Time"	Traci Paige Johnson	Angela C. Santomero	September 30, 1996	104	N/A
Steve has to figure out what Blue's favorite story is. Steve, Blue and the viewers also help Shovel and Pail act out "Jack and Jill", place photos in an album in order, and point the Three Bears to the correct bowl and cup for them. This episode was remade for Blue's Clues & You! as "Story Time with Blue".
5	5	"Blue's Favorite Song"	Todd Kessler	Angela C. Santomero	October 7, 1996	106	N/A
Steve has to figure out what song Blue wants to sing for song time. Steve, Blue and the viewers also match sounds with the correct instruments and help a chorus of chicks on a farm with their performance of "Row, Row, Row Your Boat". This episode was remade for Blue's Clues & You! as "Song Time with Blue".
6	6	"What Does Blue Need?"	Matt Sheridan	John Morning	October 14, 1996	105	N/A
Steve has to figure out what Blue needs. Steve, Blue and the viewers also help Mr. Salt and Mrs. Pepper find fruits to wash, put laundry away and guide a starfish through a maze to the ocean.
7	7	"Adventures in Art"	Matt Sheridan	John Morning & Angela C. Santomero	November 18, 1996	107	N/A
Steve has to figure out what else Blue wants to paint in her picture. Steve, Blue and the viewers also give Blue's wagon a fresh coat of paint, make a sailboat for the felt friends out of different shapes and arrange four pictures that tell a story in an art museum into the correct order.
8	8	"Blue Goes to the Beach"	Todd Kessler & Angela C. Santomero	Angela C. Santomero	November 25, 1996	108	N/A
Steve has to figure out what to bring to a pretend beach in the backyard. Steve and Blue also find what to wear at the beach, help Mr. Salt and Mrs. Pepper find out what sinks or floats and find the correct holes in a coral reef that a starfish, an octopus and a seahorse can fit through.
9	9	"A Snowy Day"	Matt Sheridan	Angela C. Santomero	December 23, 1996	110	N/A
Steve has to figure out what Blue wants to do outside in the snow. Steve, Blue and the viewers also help Mr. Salt and Mrs. Pepper find matching snowflakes, fix a winter calendar picture and get Blue dressed to go outside.
10	10	"The Trying Game"	Todd Kessler	John Morning & Angela C. Santomero	January 6, 1997	111	N/A
Steve has to figure out what Blue wants to try to do. Steve, Blue and the viewers also help Tickety Tock tell time, see what Baby Bear can be and help small swamp creatures find their older relatives.
11	11	"Pretend Time"	Matt Sheridan	John Morning & Angela C. Santomero	February 17, 1997	109	2.08
Steve has to figure out what Blue wants to pretend to be. Steve, Blue and the viewers also find shapes in the clouds, help Shovel and Pail pretend to be parents and find a baboon, a dragonfly and a frog in the jungle.
12	12	"Blue Wants to Play a Game!"	Matt Sheridan	Angela C. Santomero	March 16, 1997	112	N/A
Steve has to figure out what game Blue wants to play. Steve, Blue and the viewers also help Shovel and Pail put together a jigsaw puzzle and visit a gingerbread boy's house.
13	13	"The Grow Show"	Matt Sheridan	Angela C. Santomero	April 21, 1997	113	N/A
Steve has to figure out what Blue wants to do outside. Steve, Blue and the viewers also help Mr. Salt and Mrs. Pepper figure out where orange juice comes from, observe inchworms and puddles with Shovel and Pail and help the felt friends figure out where oranges, potatoes and grapes grow. This episode was remade for Blue's Clues & You! as "Growing with Blue".
14	14	"Blue Wants to Play a Song Game!"	Traci Paige Johnson	Michael Smith & Angela C. Santomero	April 28, 1997	114	1.71
Steve has to figure out what song game Blue wants to play. Steve, Blue and the viewers also help a sock monkey play "Two Little Monkeys", play "If You're Happy and You Know It" with Tickety Tock and dance with beach animals.
15	15	"Magenta Comes Over"	Todd Kessler	Michael Smith & Alice Wilder	October 6, 1997	119	N/A
Steve has to figure out what Blue wants to do when Magenta comes over. Steve, Blue and the viewers also follow footprints with Shovel and Pail, help Mr. Salt and Mrs. Pepper make race cars out of food and find costumes for the felt friends. This episode was remade for Blue's Clues & You! as "Playdate with Magenta".
16	16	"Tickety's Favorite Nursery Rhyme"	Matt Sheridan	Michael Smith & Alice Wilder	October 6, 1997	117	N/A
Steve has to figure out what Tickety Tock's favorite nursery rhyme is. Steve, Blue and the viewers also pack a special lunch with Mr. Salt and Mrs. Pepper, solve a toy crossing guard's riddles and help a black sheep make a rhyming story.
17	17	"What Does Blue Want to Make?"	Matt Sheridan	Angela C. Santomero	October 13, 1997	115	N/A
Steve has to figure out what Blue wants to make. Steve, Blue and the viewers help complete a pattern on Mr. Salt and Mrs. Pepper's macaroni picture frame, figure out what the felt friends can make out of shapes and bake a banana cake at a bakery.
18	18	"Blue's News"	Traci Paige Johnson	Angela C. Santomero	October 20, 1997	120	N/A
Steve has to figure out what news Blue has to tell. Steve, Blue and the viewers also go on a treasure hunt with Shovel and Pail, solve a felt friend's riddles and journey through a chalk world to meet Slippery Soap's friend. This episode was remade for Blue's Clues & You! as "Big News with Blue".
19	19	"What Is Blue Afraid Of?"	Matt Sheridan	Angela C. Santomero	October 27, 1997	118	N/A
Steve has to figure out what Blue is afraid of. Steve, Blue and the viewers also help Shovel and Pail find out what makes different shaped shadows, look at close-up photos with Mr. Salt and Mrs. Pepper and help a ghost named Boo find out what is making strange sounds in his haunted mansion.

=== Season 2 (1997–99) ===
No. overall	No. in season	Title	Directed by	Written by	Original release date	Prod. code
20	1	"Steve Gets the Sniffles"	Matt Sheridan	Angela C. Santomero	November 3, 1997	2x01
Steve has to figure out what will make him feel better from the sniffles. Steve, Blue and the viewers also find healthy snacks that are different from the others and skidoo into a story about a girl named Jill. This episode was remade for Blue's Clues & You! as "Getting Healthy with Blue".
21	2	"What Does Blue Want to Build?"	Traci Paige Johnson	Michael Smith & Alice Wilder	November 10, 1997	2x02
Steve has to figure out what Blue wants to build. Steve, Blue and the viewers also see what can be made out of popsicle sticks, build dribble sandcastles with Shovel and Pail and guide a gadget named Tink back to her flinging contraption.
22	3	"Blue's ABCs"	Todd Kessler	Angela C. Santomero	December 8, 1997	2x07
Steve has to figure out what book Blue wants to read. Steve, Blue and the viewers also help Mr. Salt and Mrs. Pepper find groceries and rearrange words in a storybook so the sentences make sense. This episode was remade for Blue's Clues & You! as "ABC's with Blue".
23	4	"Math!"	Daniel Silverman	Angela C. Santomero	December 15, 1997	2x08
Steve has to figure out what Blue wants to buy. Steve, Blue and the viewers also count apples with Mr. Salt and Mrs. Pepper, along with graham crackers with Shovel and Pail and buy a new crayon and a green baseball cap at the Present Store. This episode was remade for Blue's Clues & You! as "123's with Blue".
24	5	"What Experiment Does Blue Want to Try?"	Paul Zehrer	Angela C. Santomero	February 9, 1998	2x04
Steve has to figure out what experiment Blue wants to try. Steve, Blue and the viewers also look through a magnifying glass and skidoo to outer space where they sing a song about the planets. This episode was remade for Blue's Clues & You! as "Science with Blue".
25	6	"Blue's Senses"	Alan Zdinak	Michael Smith & Alice Wilder	March 23, 1998	2x03
Steve has to figure out what Blue wants to play. Steve, Blue and the viewers also use their senses to feel objects underneath a bed, play "Lights On, Lights Off" and see which toys get put away and listen to sounds in a computer game.
26	7	"What Does Blue Want to Make Out of Recycled Things?"	Alan Zdinak	Angela C. Santomero	April 27, 1998	2x05
Steve has to figure out what Blue wants to make out of recyclables. Steve, Blue and the viewers also sort recyclables, make a maraca with Tickety Tock and find what to make in a recycle town with a cup, a tire and drink holders.
27	8	"What Was Blue's Dream About?"	Paul Zehrer	Michael Smith & Alice Wilder	May 25, 1998	2x06
Steve has to figure out what Blue had a dream about. Steve, Blue and the viewers also find out what dreams Slippery Soap, a felt friend, Mr. Salt, Mrs. Pepper and Paprika were having and change Sleeping Beauty's nightmare into a dream about a party.
28	9	"Blue's Birthday"	Traci Paige Johnson	Angela C. Santomero	June 14, 1998	2x09
Steve has to figure out what Blue wants for a birthday present. Steve and the viewers also finish decorating for Blue's birthday party, find presents at the Present Store and watch Blue open presents. This episode was remade for Blue's Clues & You! as "Happy Birthday, Blue!".
29	10	"What Does Blue Want to do with Her Picture?"	Nancy Keegan	Nick Balaban, Dr. Alice Wilder & Michael Smith	June 29, 1998	2x10
Steve has to figure out what Blue wants to do with a drawing that she colored in. Steve, Blue and the viewers also follow an ice cream trail, help a felt friend get dressed and arrange recipe cards for banana muffins into the correct order.
30	11	"Blue's Sad Day"	Paul Zehrer	Angela C. Santomero	October 12, 1998	2x14
Steve has to figure out why Blue is feeling sad. Steve, Blue and the viewers also identify feelings and solve problems at Blue's school. This episode was remade for Blue's Clues & You! as "Sad Day with Blue".
31	12	"What Does Blue Want to Do on a Rainy Day?"	Daniel Silverman	Angela C. Santomero	October 12, 1998	2x11
Steve has to figure out what Blue wants to do on a rainy day. Steve, Blue and the viewers also help Mr. Salt and Mrs. Pepper make a xylophone out of glass jars filled with water and help farm animals find their partners who sing the same song.
32	13	"Blue's Surprise at Two O'Clock!"	Alan Zdinak	Adam Peltzman & Angela C. Santomero	October 19, 1998	2x12
Steve has to figure out what surprise Blue has that will be ready at two o'clock. Steve, Blue and the viewers also help Tickety Tock practice telling time and guess which pictures a grandfather clock reveals before time runs out.
33	14	"The Lost Episode!"	Daniel Silverman	Dr. Alice Wilder & Michael Smith	October 26, 1998	2x13
Steve has to figure out where Blue was when she lost her backpack. Steve, Blue and the viewers also help Shovel and Pail find their missing toys and help a boy named Felix go back to where he left three belongings that he needed for school.
34	15	"What Game Does Blue Want to Learn?"	Paul Zehrer	Angela C. Santomero & Jennifer Brackenbury	November 2, 1998	2x15
Steve has to figure out what game Blue wants to learn how to play. Steve, Blue and the viewers also play tic-tac-toe with a felt friend and play "Mother, may I?" with Shovel and Pail.
35	16	"What Story Does Blue Want to Play?"	Todd Kessler	Todd Kessler	November 9, 1998 (Note: This episode was first released in Story Time VHS on June 9, 1998.)	1x16
Steve has to figure out what story Blue wants to play. Steve, Blue and the viewers also help storybook characters find which book they belong in and act out a rabbit's story, with Steve doing an Elvis impression.
36	17	"What Did Blue See?"	Alan Zdinak	Dr. Alice Wilder & Michael Smith	December 7, 1998	2x16
Steve has to figure out what Blue saw outside. Steve, Blue and the viewers also look through a kaleidoscope and see parts of a park from the perspectives of animals calling, "Yoo-hoo!".
37	18	"Nurture!"	Nancy Keegan	Koyalee Chanda	January 5, 1999	2x17
Steve has to figure out what he and Blue need to do. Steve, Blue and the viewers also give Paprika what she needs and find the homes of young safari animals who need a bath.
38	19	"Blue Is Frustrated"	Todd Kessler	Todd Kessler	February 1, 1999	2x18
Steve has to figure out what is frustrating Blue. Steve, Blue and the viewers also help Mr. Salt and Mrs. Pepper pack for a picnic and balance a rabbit's teeter-totter.
39	20	"What Is Blue Trying to Do?"	Nancy Keegan	Wendy Harris	February 8, 1999	2x19
Steve has to figure out what Blue is trying to do. Steve, Blue and the viewers also help Slippery Soap blow bubbles, clean Baby Bear's room and put together a jigsaw puzzle of the Blue's Clues house.
40	21	"Mechanics!"	Alan Zdinak	Adam Peltzman	February 15, 1999	2x20
Steve has to figure out what needs to be fixed. Steve, Blue and the viewers also watch Shovel and Pail's toy cars roll down ramps at different speeds, learn how a tape recorder works and help a rabbit, a pig and a chipmunk in a road race game.

=== Season 3 (1999–2002) ===
No. overall	No. in season	Title	Directed by	Written by	Original release date	Prod. code
41	1	"Blue's Big Treasure Hunt"	Traci Paige Johnson	Angela C. Santomero	March 14, 1999	3x11
Steve has to figure out who set up a treasure hunt for him and Blue. Steve, Blue and the viewers also find treasure hunt hints, solve a riddle from Mr. Salt and discover a door hidden behind a bookcase that leads to a land of great discovery. The Golden Girls star Rue McClanahan guest stars
42	2	"Art Appreciation"	Nancy Keegan	Michael T. Smith	April 26, 1999	3x01
Steve has to figure out what Blue is making for an art show in the backyard. Steve, Blue and the viewers also find fishes hidden in masterpieces and help characters from paintings find where they belong.
43	3	"Weight and Balance"	Alan Zdinak	Michael T. Smith	May 10, 1999	3x02
Steve has to figure out what Blue wants to do that involves weighing. Steve, Blue and the viewers also weigh groceries and help out at a country store.
44	4	"What's That Sound?"	Koyalee Chanda	Adam Peltzman	June 7, 1999	3x04
Steve has to figure out what Blue hears. Steve, Blue and the viewers also help Shovel and Pail follow a gopher and add sounds to a silent movie.
45	5	"Animal Behavior!"	Alan Zdinak	Adam Peltzman	June 22, 1999	3x08
Steve has to figure out what animal Blue wants to learn about. Steve, Blue and the viewers also use their animal book to find out why bears go in caves, beavers collect sticks and bluebirds tweet and find camouflaged fish in a submarine ride.
46	6	"Blue's Big Pajama Party"	Lucy Walker	Adam Peltzman	October 10, 1999	3x19
Steve has to figure out what Blue wants to do at their pajama party. Steve, Blue and the viewers also find nocturnal animals in the backyard and skidoo to outer space to find out why there is night. This episode was remade for Blue's Clues & You! as "Pajama Party with Blue".
47	7	"Draw Along with Blue"	Nancy Keegan	Adam Peltzman	October 18, 1999	3x13
Steve has to figure out what Blue wants to draw. Steve, Blue and the viewers also draw pictures of friends using shapes and help a chalk girl tell a story using chalk drawings.
48	8	"Hide and Seek"	Lucy Walker	Dr. Alice Wilder & Michael T. Smith	October 25, 1999	3x07
Steve has to figure out where Blue wants to hide. Steve and the viewers also help felt friends find what they are missing and find Blue in a book all about the color blue.
49	9	"Thankful"	Marygrace O'Shea	Jennifer Brackenbury & Angela C. Santomero	November 15, 1999	3x06
Steve has to figure out what Blue is thankful for. Steve, Blue and the viewers also find out what their friends are thankful for, find foods that are salty, sour and sweet for their feast and cut foods into fractions for a felt family. This episode was remade for Blue's Clues & You! as "Thankful with Blue".
50	10	"Blue's Big Holiday"	Koyalee Chanda	Angela C. Santomero, Dr. Alice Wilder & Michael T. Smith	November 29, 1999	3x22
Steve has to figure out what memory Blue wants to add to their holiday quilt. Steve, Blue and the viewers also find toys that are different from the others and deliver them to friends who celebrate Christmas, Hanukkah and Kwanzaa.
51	11	"Pool Party"	Lucy Walker	Koyalee Chanda	April 3, 2000	3x12
Steve has to figure out who he and Blue forgot to invite to their pool party. Steve, Blue and the viewers also make ice cream sundaes and play a memory game with a joker card.
52	12	"Anatomy"	Nancy Keegan	Alison Sherman & Michael T. Smith	April 10, 2000	3x10
Steve has to figure out what Blue discovered in her anatomy. Steve, Blue and the viewers also find taste buds, an ear drum and a pupil on the computer, lift a heavy bag for Mr. Salt and Mrs. Pepper and help Sarah Scientist test her x-ray machine.
53	13	"Signs"	Nancy Keegan	Michael T. Smith	April 24, 2000	3x05
Steve has to figure out where Blue wants to eat her snack. Steve, Blue and the viewers also help Pail find shovel using signs and learn American sign language with two girls named Jane and Carly.
54	14	"Nature"	Lucy Walker	Wendy Harris	July 3, 2000	3x14
Steve has to figure out what Blue wants to play outside on a springtime day. Steve, Blue and the viewers also help Mr. Salt make a bouquet for Mrs. Pepper, find a deer, a red tulip and a waterfall on a nature walk and skidoo into a book about the four seasons to find what is out of place.
55	15	"Geography"	Nancy Keegan	Angela C. Santomero	July 10, 2000	3x03
Steve has to figure out where Blue wants to go. Steve, Blue and the viewers also help Shovel and Pail with a map of the neighborhood and take different forms of transportation to a gingerbread girl's house.
56	16	"Occupations"	Koyalee Chanda	Michael Smith	July 17, 2000	3x09
Steve has to figure out what job Blue wants to play. Steve, Blue and the viewers also find out what jobs their friends are playing and help a door find out the correct occupations for building a house.
57	17	"Blue's Big Mystery"	Koyalee Chanda	Adam Peltzman	September 25, 2000	3x21
Steve has to figure out who built a fort outside. Steve, Blue and the viewers also use the clues as evidence to find out who the mystery builder is.
58	18	"Periwinkle Misses His Friend"	Lucy Walker	Adam Peltzman	October 2, 2000	3x26
Steve needs to figure out what Periwinkle can do to feel better about missing his friend. Steve, Blue and the viewers also help a tractor find a taxicab and play backyard versions of Periwinkle's favorite city games.
59	19	"Blue's Big Musical"	Todd Kessler	Angela C. Santomero & Michael T. Smith	January 13, 2002 (Note: This movie was first released on Blue's Big Musical Movie VHS/DVD on October 3, 2000.)	3x31
Steve needs to figure out who can be Blue's singing partner for the "You Can Be Anything You Want to Be" show. Steve, Blue and the viewers also put together costumes, set up a stage and learn how to put together a song.
60	20	"What's So Funny?"	Koyalee Chanda	Adam Peltzman	October 9, 2000	3x16
Steve needs to figure out what will make Blue laugh. Steve, Blue and the viewers also follow a gopher's patterns and see what is mixed up in Silly Town. This episode was remade for Blue's Clues & You! as "Laugh with Blue".
61	21	"Blue's Big Costume Party"	Lucy Walker	Michael Smith & Alice Wilder	October 16, 2000	3x18
Steve needs to figure out what costume Magenta should wear to a costume party. Steve, Blue and the viewers also count monster bags in a monster toss game and find the Oogla-Boogla in Boo's haunted mansion. This episode was remade for Blue's Clues & You! as "Spooky Costume Party with Blue".
62	22	"Inventions"	Marygrace O'Shea	Angela Santomero & Jennifer Brackenbury	October 23, 2000	3x15
Steve needs to figure out what Blue invented. Steve, Blue and the viewers also help Shovel and Pail arrange invention cards into the correct order and skidoo to an invention workshop to find out what the inventors are building.
63	23	"Blue's Play"	Koyalee Chanda	Adam Peltzman	October 30, 2000	3x23
Steve needs to figure out how a play called, "The Funny Farm" should end. Steve, Blue and the viewers also act out different emotions and see two sides to the play's story.
64	24	"Prehistoric Blue"	Koyalee Chanda	Michael Smith	November 6, 2000	3x24
Steve needs to figure out what Blue saw in the backyard that looks like a dinosaur. Steve, Blue and the viewers also find animals in the backyard that have the same features that dinosaurs had and skidoo millions of years back in time to see what dinosaurs used those features for.
65	25	"The Wrong Shirt"	Koyalee Chanda	Michael Smith	November 13, 2000	3x29
Steve needs to figure out what opposite Blue is thinking of. Steve, Blue and the viewers also have a delivery man named Bob fix what turned opposite and help a pair of opposite sisters make their favorite places.
66	26	"Words"	Koyalee Chanda	Adam Peltzman	December 4, 2000	3x25
Steve needs to figure out what Blue wants to do with the words she brought home from school. Steve, Blue and the viewers also make a salad for Mr. Salt and Mrs. Pepper's friends and skidoo into a blank piece of paper, using the words to make anything appear.
67	27	"Shy"	Koyalee Chanda	Alice Wilder & Michael Smith	February 19, 2001	3x20
Steve needs to figure out why Blue is feeling shy. Steve, Blue and the viewers also help Shovel get to know Pail's new friend, Sifter and help Blue's classmates who are feeling shy.
68	28	"Magenta Gets Glasses"	Lucy Walker	Angela Santomero	March 6, 2001	4x01
Steve needs to figure out what Magenta can do with her new glasses. Steve, Blue and the viewers also visit the eye doctor with Magenta and Miranda and convince Magenta to wear her new glasses at the playground. This episode was remade for Blue's Clues & You! as "Getting Glasses with Magenta".
69	29	"Environments"	Alan Zdinak	Sarah Chumsky & Michael Smith	March 13, 2001	3x17
Steve needs to figure out what environment Blue wants to visit. Steve, Blue and the viewers also sing a song about environments with Mother Nature and visit the pretend environments that their friends made.
70	30	"Stormy Weather"	Alan Zdinak	Chris Nee	March 19, 2001	3x27
Steve needs to figure out what weather is coming. Steve, Blue and the viewers also observe the weather outside and learn where rain comes from.
71	31	"Blue's Collection"	Lucy Walker	Adam Peltzman	March 26, 2001	3x28
Steve needs to figure out what is missing from Blue's circle collection. Steve, Blue and the viewers also help Periwinkle find what is missing from his collections and find seashells for Shovel's collection.
72	32	"Café Blue"	Alan Zdinak	Adam Peltzman	April 2, 2001	3x30
Steve needs to figure out what dessert should be made for a pretend restaurant. Steve, Blue and the viewers also shop for spaghetti sauce ingredients and help the customers make their portions right.

=== Season 4 (2001–06) ===
No. overall	No. in season	Title	Directed by	Written by	Original release date	Prod. code
73	1	"Imagine Nation"	Lucy Walker	Angela C. Santomero	April 9, 2001	4x02
Steve needs to figure out what Blue imagines a shape made from two chairs and a blanket to be. Steve, Blue and the viewers also tell a story using pictures made with buttons and help Mr. Salt find his imagination. This episode was remade for Blue's Clues & You! as "Blue's Big Imagination".
74	2	"Adventure"	Lucy Walker	Adam Peltzman	April 9, 2001	4x04
Steve needs to figure out what to be to reach a castle in the sky. Steve, Blue and the viewers also make their way through a land of magic spells and skidoo to find a magic key.
75	3	"The Anything Box"	Koyalee Chanda	Jessica Lissy	April 16, 2001	4x03
Steve needs to figure out what Blue wants to play with a cardboard box found in the backyard. Steve, Blue and the viewers also imagine with Shovel and Pail and use their box to reach the top of a tower in a cardboard diorama.
76	4	"Superfriends"	Koyalee Chanda	Adam Peltzman & Michael T. Smith	April 23, 2001	4x05
Steve needs to figure out where a strange sound is coming from. Steve, Blue and the viewers also clean up a spill, help Mr. Salt and Paprika and help a boy named Frank figure out what his superpower is. This episode was remade for Blue's Clues & You! as "The Thinking Squad".
77	5	"What's New, Blue?"	Koyalee Chanda	Adam Peltzman	October 8, 2001	4x10
Steve needs to figure out what news Blue wants to write about. Steve, Blue and the viewers also collect more news around the house and skidoo into a newspaper.
78	6	"Blue's New Place"	Bruce Caines	Jessica Lissy	October 15, 2001	4x07
Steve needs to figure out what Blue's favorite activity is in her special place. Steve and the viewers also find what Paprika can use as she is getting older and take a tour of Blue's special place.
79	7	"Mr. Salt and Mrs. Pepper Day"	Bruce Caines	Michael T. Smith	October 22, 2001	4x09
Steve needs to figure out what Blue wants to write in her card for Mr. Salt and Mrs. Pepper. Steve, Blue and the viewers also clean up the kitchen and find out what Mr. Salt and Mrs. Pepper enjoy doing.
80	8	"The Baby's Here!"	Lucy Walker	Angela C. Santomero	October 22, 2001	4x06
Steve needs to figure out what can be done to welcome Paprika's new baby brother, Cinnamon. Steve, Blue and the viewers also look at photos of their friends as babies and meet Cinnamon at the baby hospital.
81	9	"Making Changes"	Bruce Caines	Jessica Lissy	October 29, 2001	4x13
Steve needs to figure out what else can be done to help out with Cinnamon. Steve, Blue and the viewers make adjustments around the house and meet Baby Bear's new baby sister.
82	10	"Bugs!"	Jonathan Judge	David Simpatico	November 5, 2001	4x11
Steve needs to figure out what Blue's favorite insect is. Steve, Blue and the viewers also find more insects with Periwinkle, Shovel and Pail and see the inside of an anthill.
83	11	"¡Un Día Con Plum!"	Koyalee Chanda	Adam Peltzman	November 19, 2001	4x12
Steve needs to figure out what marionette should be made for a marionette show with Periwinkle's friend Plum. Steve, Blue and the viewers also learn Spanish words while putting together a marionette and helping a puppet named Pedro find clothes to wear.
84	12	"What's Inside?"	Lucy Walker	Chris Nee	November 26, 2001	4x08
Steve needs to figure out where the key to an old trunk is. Steve, Blue and the viewers also play a grocery game with Mr. Salt, Mrs. Pepper and Paprika and skidoo into a pull-tab book.
85	13	"Blocks"	Koyalee Chanda	Adam Peltzman	December 3, 2001	4x17
Steve needs to figure out what to build with blocks to connect his playground to Blue's tower. Steve and the viewers also help make Blue's block tower stable and skidoo with her and Green Puppy to a construction site made of blocks.
86	14	"Let's Boogie!"	Koyalee Chanda	Jessica Lissy	January 28, 2002	4x16
Steve needs to figure out what Blue wants to make a dance about. Steve, Blue and the viewers also dance like a leaf, a dandelion and a seed pod in the wind and act out a choreographer's story with dance moves.
87	15	"Blue's Backyard Ballgame Bonanza"	Bruce Caines	Adam Peltzman	February 15, 2002	4x20
Steve needs to figure out what ball game Blue wants to play. Steve, Blue and the viewers also have a bounce-off in the backyard and skidoo into a sand stadium for an obstacle course.
88	16	"Let's Plant"	Alan Zdinak	Jessica Lissy	March 11, 2002	4x21
Steve needs to figure out what kind of plant that one he and Blue have named Nero is. Steve, Blue and the viewers also pretend to be aster plants with Periwinkle and observe what different plants can do.
89	17	"Rhyme Time"	Alan Zdinak	Adam Peltzman	November 24, 2003	4x19
Steve needs to figure out what Blue wants to rhyme about. Steve, Blue and the viewers also help Mr. Salt make a rhyming lullaby for Paprika and Cinnamon and skidoo into a rhyming storybook to help a bear in a chair, a king with a ring and a pig eating a fig.
90	18	"Puppets"	Bruce Caines	Jennifer Twomey Perello	November 25, 2003	4x27
Steve needs to figure out what story should be told using puppets. Steve, Blue and the viewers also help Tickety Tock and Slippery Soap tell a story with their puppets and puppeteer for a story about a dragon.
91	19	"Blue's Book Nook"	Koyalee Chanda	Adam Peltzman	November 26, 2003 (Note: This episode was first released in Reading with Blue VHS on May 7, 2002.)	4x15
Steve needs to figure out what Blue wants to read about. Steve, Blue and the viewers also help their friends find the books they need, read a story called "Helen's Hiding Place" and visit the library to find a book about elephants.
92	20	"Blue's School"	Bruce Caines	Angela C. Santomero & Jennifer Twomey Perello	August 1, 2006 (Note: This episode was first released in Classic Clues VHS/DVD on January 24, 2004.)	4x18
Steve needs to figure out where to go on a pretend school bus. Steve, Blue and the viewers also read a story called, "I'm a Yellow School Bus", mix colors and find what starts with the letters, G, A and S.
93	21	"Something To Do Blue"	Bruce Caines	Angela C. Santomero & Jennifer Twomey Perello	August 1, 2006	4x14
Blue needs to figure out what she can do with her three clues. Steve, Blue and the viewers also guess what pictures Periwinkle can make with two squares and a marker and skidoo into a cardboard diorama to figure out what the children can play.
94	22	"Joe and Tell"	Bruce Caines	Jessica Lissy	April 29, 2002	4x23
Steve needs to figure out what his brother Joe is bringing for show and tell. Steve and the viewers also add stickers to Steve's picture for Joe and arrange pictures of Blue feeding her pet turtle named Turquoise and Slippery Soap brushing his teeth into the correct order.
95	23	"Joe Gets a Clue"	Koyalee Chanda	Adam Peltzman	April 29, 2002	4x24
Steve and Joe need to figure out what present Blue has. Steve and the viewers also teach Joe how to play Blue's Clues and play hide and seek in a shape board.
96	24	"Steve Goes to College"	Koyalee Chanda	Adam Peltzman	April 29, 2002	4x25
Joe needs to figure out what his brother Steve should bring to college. Steve also gives Blue and the viewers a tour of college and Joe and their friends have a surprise "good luck at college" party before Steve's bus for college arrives.

=== Season 5 (2002–03) ===
No. overall	No. in season	Title	Directed by	Written by	Original release date	Prod. code
97	1	"Can You Help?"	Bruce Caines	Angela C. Santomero	April 30, 2002	4x30
Joe needs to figure out what Blue needs help playing. Joe and the viewers also help Mr. Salt and Mrs. Pepper make blueberry pancakes for Blue and find what Baby Bear, Cinderella and Gingerbread Boy are missing for a porridge party.
98	2	"Colors Everywhere!"	Koyalee Chanda	Jennifer Twomey Perello	May 6, 2002	5x02
Joe needs to figure out who Blue wants to add to a painting called, the "Portrait of Pals". Joe, Blue and the viewers also mix colors for the painting and help colors in a book find their friends. This episode was remade for Blue's Clues & You! as "Colors Everywhere with Blue".
99	3	"The Snack Chart"	Lucy Walker	Jessica Lissy	May 13, 2002	5x01
Joe needs to figure out what Blue's favorite snack is. Joe, Blue and the viewers also count squirrels and birds with Shovel and Pail and feed a felt farmer's pigs.
100	4	"The Big Book About Us"	Bruce Caines	Koyalee Chanda	May 20, 2002	4x22
Joe needs to figure out what to put on the front of a book of favorite things. Joe, Blue and the viewers also find stickers for everyone's pages.
101	5	"Playing Store"	Alan Zdinak	Christopher Lyboldt	May 27, 2002	5x08
Joe needs to figure out what Blue wants from a pretend store. Joe, Blue and the viewers also buy a toy sailboat, a picture frame and strawberries and help out at a furniture store.
102	6	"Patience"	Koyalee Chanda	Koyalee Chanda	June 3, 2002	5x09
Joe needs to figure out what he, Blue and Periwinkle can do while they wait for an egg to hatch. Joe, Blue and the viewers also put together a toy airplane with Periwinkle and find activities to pass time in a long line.
103	7	"100th Episode Celebration!"	Koyalee Chanda	Adam Peltzman	June 10, 2002	5x31
Joe, Blue and their friends are celebrating one hundred episodes by having a special show with montages full of clips from previous episodes and a surprise visit from Steve.
104	8	"Joe's Surprise Party"	Alan Zdinak	Adam Peltzman	August 5, 2002	5x10
The viewers need to figure out what Blue and her friends need to do in order to finish preparing for Joe's birthday party. Blue and the viewers also set a table for the party, find a candle for the birthday cake and keep Joe busy outside until it is time for him to come back inside.
105	9	"I'm So Happy!"	Alan Zdinak	Angela C. Santomero	September 2, 2002	4x28
Joe needs to figure out what makes Blue happy. Joe, Blue and the viewers also find out what makes Shovel, Periwinkle and Tickety Tock happy and solve problems for Felix and his friends.
106	10	"The Boat Float"	Alan Zdinak	Jeff Borkin	September 9, 2002	4x26
Joe needs to figure out what kind of boat Blue wants to make for a boat float in the backyard. Joe, Blue and the viewers also help Periwinkle, Shovel and Pail float their boats and learn how different boats move on the water.
107	11	"Bedtime Business"	Bruce Caines	Angela C. Santomero	September 16, 2002	5x15
Joe needs to figure out what Blue's favorite part of bedtime is. Joe, Blue and the viewers also find different parts of the body to wash and find pajamas for Tickety Tock, Shovel and Pail.
108	12	"Shape Searchers"	Bruce Caines	Adam Peltzman	September 23, 2002	5x03
Joe needs to figure out where Blue wants to search for shapes. Joe, Blue and the viewers also find shapes in the bedroom and make a stop sign, a fish and a car using felt shapes.
109	13	"Blue Goes to the Doctor"	Bruce Caines	Jessica Lissy	September 30, 2002	5x12
Joe needs to figure out what Blue wants to do after her checkup. Joe and the viewers also find what Shovel and Pail need for a pretend checkup with three stuffed animals and help out at Blue's checkup.
110	14	"Contraptions!"	Alan Zdinak	Adam Peltzman	October 7, 2002	5x05
Joe needs to figure out what Blue's contraption will do. Joe, Blue and the viewers also watch contraptions in the backyard and skidoo into a computer game to find the missing parts to different contraptions.
111	15	"A Brand New Game"	Bruce Caines	Jeff Borkin	October 21, 2002	5x06
Joe needs to figure out where Blue wants to play her new game. Joe, Blue and the viewers also play a song game with Periwinkle and pretend with a felt friend.
112	16	"A Surprise Guest"	Alan Zdinak	Jessica Lissy	January 6, 2003	5x04
Joe needs to figure out who the surprise guest visiting the yellow house is. Joe, Blue and the viewers also clean up the bedroom and find what is out of place at Blue's school.
113	17	"Dress Up Day"	Alan Zdinak	Koyalee Chanda	January 13, 2003	5x17
Joe needs to figure out what Blue wants the viewers to dress up as. Joe, Blue and the viewers also see what Shovel, Pail and Slippery Soap dress up as and find different costumes for an ostrich's play.
114	18	"Blue's Big Band"	Bruce Caines	Jennifer Twomey Perello	February 17, 2003 (Note: This episode was first released in Blue's Big Band VHS/DVD on February 4, 2003.)	5x07
Joe needs to figure out what instrument Blue wants to play in a band. Joe, Blue and the viewers also clap rhythms and act out a story with piano music.
115	19	"Up, Down, All Around!"	Jonathan Judge	Adam Peltzman	March 3, 2003	5x14
Joe needs to figure out what Blue wants to find. Joe, Blue and the viewers also guide a felt friend back to his home and look in different directions to find Little Bo Peep's sheep.
116	20	"The Story Wall"	Elizabeth Holder	Sascha Paladino	April 28, 2003	5x18
Joe needs to figure out what two rabbits in a picture story will do when they reach their grandmother's house. Joe, Blue and the viewers also find the correct pictures for the story and skidoo into three blank pieces of paper to make three new pictures for the story.
117	21	"The Alphabet Train"	Jonathan Judge	Jeff Borkin	May 5, 2003	5x11
Joe needs to figure out what Blue wants to put in the final box of a cardboard train called, the "Alphabet Train". Joe, Blue and the viewers also find other friends and objects to put in the other alphabet boxes in the backyard and on a clothesline as well as a magnet board.
118	22	"Numbers Everywhere!"	Jonathan Judge	Jennifer Twomey Perello	May 12, 2003	5x13
Joe needs to figure out what Blue's favorite number is. Joe, Blue and the viewers also help Mr. Salt and Paprika find missing number magnets and do addition and subtraction in a story about a jellybean tree.
119	23	"Blue's Predictions"	Alan Zdinak	Jeff Borkin	May 19, 2003	5x16
Joe needs to figure out what Blue predicts what will happen on the patio of the yellow house. Joe, Blue and the viewers also make predictions in the backyard as well as in a storybook with a bookmark voiced by Henry Winkler.
120	24	"Our Neighborhood Festival"	Koyalee Chanda	Sascha Paladino	June 23, 2003	5x27
Joe needs to figure out what Blue is excited about in a neighborhood festival. Joe, Blue and the viewers also play festival games with Periwinkle, Slippery Soap and Marlee the librarian. At the beginning of the credits is a dedication card to Fred Rogers, who died of stomach cancer four months before this episode aired.
121	25	"Blue Takes You to School"	Elizabeth Holder	Dr. Alice Wilder	August 11, 2003	5x29
Joe needs to figure out what Blue's favorite part of school is. Joe, Blue and the viewers also help Periwinkle throughout his first day at school.
122	26	"Meet Polka Dots!"	Jonathan Judge	Adam Peltzman	September 15, 2003	5x26
Joe needs to figure out what Blue wants to play with her stuffed toy named Polka Dots. Joe, Blue and the viewers also let Slippery Soap and Tickety Tock play with Polka Dots and guess what Periwinkle is imagining his paper plate friend to be.
123	27	"The Scavenger Hunt"	Koyalee Chanda	Angela C. Santomero	September 16, 2003	4x29
Joe needs to figure out what will be done after finishing a list for a scavenger hunt. Joe, Blue and the viewers also find ingredients for cupcakes in the kitchen along with different shapes in the felt frame.
124	28	"Let's Write!"	Alan Zdinak	Koyalee Chanda	September 17, 2003	5x20
Joe needs to figure out what Blue wants to write a label for. Joe, Blue and the viewers also make labels for boxes in the attic and paint the four letters that spell the word, "jump".
125	29	"Magenta's Messages"	Alan Zdinak	Jessica Lissy	September 18, 2003	5x19
Joe needs to figure out what Blue wants to write in her message for Magenta. Joe, Blue and the viewers also do assigned chores in Magenta's house and read an email from her.
126	30	"Body Language"	Bruce Caines	Sascha Paladino	September 19, 2003	5x21
Joe needs to figure out what feeling Blue wants to do for a feelings game. Joe, Blue and the viewers also find the correct emotion stickers for Periwinkle's book and find the correct actors for a shadow play.
127	31	"Blue's Big Car Trip"	Koyalee Chanda	Jessica Lissy	September 22, 2003	5x25
Joe needs to figure out where he and Blue are going on a car trip. Joe, Blue and the viewers also sing along to "The Backseat Boogie" (performed by Patti LaBelle, with Casey Kasem as the radio announcer), count the gallons of gasoline needed to refuel the car and find numbers while waiting at a toll booth.
128	32	"Look Carefully..."	Jonathan Judge	Jennifer Twomey Perello	September 23, 2003	5x22
Joe needs to figure out what Blue wants to look carefully at. Joe, Blue and the viewers also play "Gopher's Mystery Box" with Shovel and Pail and skidoo to a game show called, "How Observant Are You?", where they make observations while watching a short film about two children.
129	33	"I Did That!"	Bruce Caines	Alison Sherman	September 24, 2003	5x23
Joe needs to figure out what Blue wants to make the viewers do. Joe, Blue and the viewers also find solutions to problems in the backyard with Shovel and Tickety Tock as well as with Blue's friends at school.
130	34	"Animals in Our House?"	Elizabeth Holder	Jeff Borkin	September 25, 2003	5x24
Joe needs to figure out what animal Blue wants to find. Joe, Blue and the viewers also search for animals that have been wandering around the yellow house and learn how they use their special traits as each animal skidoos back into a book about animals where they belong.
131	35	"Morning Music"	Elizabeth Holder	Jeff Borkin	September 29, 2003	5x28
Joe needs to figure out what Blue wants to do outside after a morning routine. Joe, Blue and the viewers also sing songs about eating breakfast, brushing teeth, putting clothes on and tying shoes.
132	36	"Blue's First Holiday"	Koyalee Chanda	Adam Peltzman	December 12, 2003 (Note: This episode was first released in Blue's First Holiday VHS/DVD on September 30, 2003.)	5x30
Joe, Blue and their friends watch a holiday movie about Blue's first holiday. During an intermission, Joe, Blue and the viewers get a surprise phone call from Steve at college and read a holiday card from families who celebrate four different holidays. The holiday movie continues with Blue as a baby playing the first ever game of Blue's Clues in order to find baby Joe's missing duck blanket.

=== Season 6 (2004–06) ===
No. overall	No. in season	Title	Directed by	Written by	Original release date	Prod. code
133	1	"The Legend of the Blue Puppy"	Koyalee Chanda	Angela C. Santomero	February 8, 2004	6x07
After a moon fairy named Moona tells Blue a story about her birth under a blue moon, Joe, Blue and the viewers find a magic key that would unlock a special playroom for Blue.
134	2	"Love Day"	Elizabeth Holder	Jeff Borkin	February 16, 2004	6x01
Joe needs to figure out who sent him a Love Day card. Joe, Blue and the viewers also resolve misunderstandings between their friends and skidoo into a love story about a prince and a princess. When Joe and the viewers figure out that Cinderella (Mary Stuart Masterson) sent the Love Day card, she visits the yellow house as well as Blue's Room.
135	3	"Blue's Wishes"	Jonathan Judge	Jessica Lissy	February 16, 2004	6x04
Joe needs to figure out what Blue's wish will be. Joe, Blue and the viewers also grant wishes for their friends with help from a magic wand named Wish. In Blue's Room, Blue and her playroom friends celebrate Frederica's birthday.
136	4	"Joe's Clues"	Koyalee Chanda	Adam Peltzman	February 23, 2004	6x05
Blue needs to figure out what surprise Joe has for her and the viewers by playing a game of "Joe's Clues", where Joe would leave three clues instead of Blue. In Blue's Room, Blue and the viewers would play a game called, "Polka Dots' Puzzles".
137	5	"Skidoo Adventure"	Alan Zdinak	Adam Peltzman	March 15, 2004	6x03
Joe, Blue and the viewers skidoo into a pretend world called, "Wacky Wild World" and need to find their way home. In Blue's Room, Blue and her playroom friends sing a song about home being "a spectacular place".
138	6	"Playdates"	Koyalee Chanda	Jeff Borkin	March 22, 2004	6x06
Joe needs to figure out what Blue and the viewers will play together. The viewers also help Periwinkle perform a magic trick, read a letter from Mailbox and skidoo to a playdate with Joe. After Blue's Clues was figured out, Blue pretends to be a firefighter with the viewers in Blue's Room.
139	7	"The Fairy Tale Ball"	Alan Zdinak	Jeff Borkin	April 5, 2004	6x09
Joe needs to figure out who Blue wants to see at the Fairy Tale Ball. Joe, Blue and the viewers also determine which little pig's house is the strongest, grow a beanstalk with Jack and return a glass slipper to Cinderella. In Blue's Room, Blue and her playroom friends dress up as fairy tale characters.
140	8	"Soccer Practice"	Jonathan Judge	Adam Peltzman	April 26, 2004	6x08
Joe needs to figure out what Blue wants to do after soccer practice. Whenever a goal is scored, a flag with a clue pictured on it would be shown. In Blue's Room, Blue and the viewers help a boy drawn on Doodleboard score a goal.
141	9	"Bluestock"	Koyalee Chanda	Sascha Paladino	May 10, 2004	6x02
Joe needs to figure out what song Blue wants to sing in a backyard concert called, "Bluestock". The concert features special appearances of Toni Braxton, Macy Gray and India Arie, as well as a video letter from They Might Be Giants. In Blue's Room, Blue sings Twinkle, Twinkle, Little Star with the viewers. This episode was remade for Blue's Clues & You! with the same episode title.
142	10	"Behind the Clues: 10 Years of Blue"	Koyalee Chanda	Angela C. Santomero & Jeff Borkin	July 27, 2006	6x10
143	11	"Meet Blue's Baby Brother!"	Koyalee Chanda	Angela C. Santomero & Jeff Borkin	August 6, 2006	6x11
