= Beyond Our Control =

- BOC arrow designed by David Blodgett in 1967
- Created by: Dave Williams
- Starring: 350+ high school students
- Country of origin: United States
- No. of episodes: 247 (13 per year)

Production
- Production location: South Bend, Indiana
- Running time: 30 minutes
- Production company: WJA-TV

Original release
- Network: WNDU-TV
- Release: 1968 – 1986

Beyond Our Control is an American youth-produced sketch-comedy television series that aired on local NBC affiliate WNDU-TV in South Bend, Indiana, for 19 seasons from 1968 to 1986. Usually televised from late-January to mid-May of each year, the program was launched by WJA-TV, a company that was part of the local Junior Achievement program, designed to give high school students business and work experience. WNDU-TV, owned and operated by the University of Notre Dame, was the local JA sponsor.

Approximately 30 high school students from the Michiana region (Indiana and Michigan) were chosen annually through auditions to serve as company members. In 19 seasons, over 350 teenagers participated. There were also three primary adult advisors: Dave Williams, the creative leader until his death in 1977; Denny Laughlin, who was WNDU's art director; and Joe Dundon, who oversaw ad sales (though the kids actually went out and sold the commercial time to local businesses). After Williams' death, BOC alumni would return as writing advisors, including Bob Medich, Danny Lakin, Chris Webb, Steve Wyant, Laddie Ervin, and Joey Hasse.

Promoted as "a very nice TV show" and with the slogan "TV About TV," BOC sported its own distinctive style of parody, usually targeting TV genres like local news, commercials, game shows, soap operas, and sitcoms. Early seasons also featured musical numbers and experimental films. Footage from the program still exists and can be seen on YouTube and occasionally on public access television in the Michiana region.

Screenwriter Chris Webb, a student participant and adult writing adviser, wrote, "I think the thing that makes BOC really work is that it is done by high school kids, and the audience can tell that it was, and the show never hid the truth. So as an audience watches it, there is an inherent suspense as to whether the kids are going to pull off a scene. Sometimes they do, and then don't - occasionally within the same scene. Comedy relies on tension, and that suspense, that tension, can make the show very very funny. But even when it doesn't work, the show is still fascinating to watch. All because of the high school element."

== The series ==
Each season comprised twelve 30-minute episodes and a one-hour special. The program primarily featured comedy segments, although earlier seasons also included musical performances. By 1974, the show was almost exclusively satirical comedy bits, with interstitial channel switching interspersed between segments.

For a majority of seasons, the opening featured a kinestasis of hundreds of magazine and album covers, iconic photos and advertisements, and newspaper headlines from the current year over "Mickey's Son and Daughter" by The Bonzo Dog Doo-Dah Band. The closing theme song was "Remember (Christmas)" from the album Son of Schmilsson by Harry Nilsson and featured clips from familiar older TV shows and movies.

== Awards ==
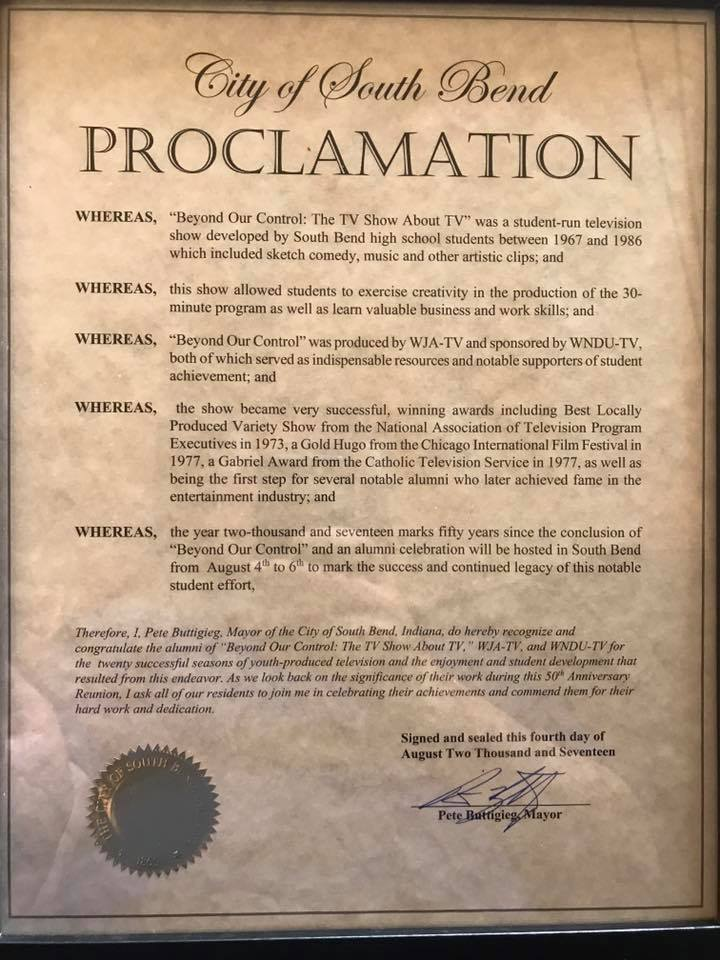
A 2017 proclamation from the City of South Bend, signed by Mayor Pete Buttigieg, celebrating and commending Beyond Our Control on its 50th anniversary

In February 1974, the National Association of Television Program Executives named Beyond Our Control the nation's best locally produced variety show. NATPE's citation described the series as "outstanding variety programming actually produced by students in South Bend, that provided a new and entertaining insight into the status of contemporary American culture as mirrored by the television Industry Itself."

In 1976, Beyond Our Control won the Chicago International Film Festival's "Gold Hugo" award for best television program in its category, competing against professional series and specials produced by major networks and local stations throughout the country.

A Gabriel Award from the Catholic Academy of Communication Professionals followed in 1977, recognizing Beyond Our Control as a top youth-oriented local television program in markets ranking smaller than number 25. The Gabriel Awards honor broadcast work that creatively treats issues concerning human values.

In 1977, the program captured one of thirty Broadcast Media Awards presented by the staff and students of San Francisco University.

Beyond Our Control also earned five awards from the Freedoms Foundation at Valley Forge for excellence in the field of Economics Education.

== History ==
According to BOC creator Dave Williams, "In 1961, the first student company took to the air with a 13-week series of half-hour shows. The students sold stock to raise operating capital, leased studio facilities from WNDU-TV, created a program format, and sold commercial advertising within the show to finance the venture. Pronounced a success, the company - known as WJA-TV - continued, largely concentrating on the production of relatively simple game shows, including local versions of charades, quiz games, and the like."

In 1966, Williams had an idea that WJA-TV could be something more, the kids agreed that making a sketch comedy show would be more fun than a quiz show, and in 1967, WJA-TV became Beyond Our Control. Over the next ten years, Williams continued to develop the framework for the show so that students would be trained and then freed to participate in all aspects of television production.

== Production ==
Writers Meetings: The show was written by high school students under the guidance of Dave Williams, who took student ideas and generated a script. Writers meetings in the mid-70s were held three evenings a week. Typed scripts were handed to company members at Wednesday night Junior Achievement meetings, at which time students had the opportunity to audition for parts or be assigned to technical positions. Actors were responsible for coming up with their own costumes and make-up.

Hands-on All-Student Production: In the early years, an adult directed the show, but by 1974, the production was entirely student-directed. Students would receive studio training, and "qualify" to run camera, audio, and studio switcher. Students ran all technical posts, including directing, floor directing, projection, and VT. Students recorded and edited the shows. Students designed and built all sets and props.

As 1981 production manager Heidi Moser recalled, "We had an amazing amount of creative freedom. I remember kids 'experimenting' with the studio switcher in ways the adults never considered. 'What happens if I do this?' We frequently pushed technology to the limit."

During the summer months, students shot and edited 16mm film using a Bolex camera. Film and animation would later be edited by student editors and sound dubbed in the studio. Students sold advertising time, and often produced commercials for local advertisers.

Technology: In the 1968 season, Beyond Our Control was black and white. Thereafter, programs were videotaped in color. Until 1982, the majority of the program was produced in the WNDU-TV studios and recorded on 2" videotape. Some bits were shot on 16mm film, cut and spliced, sound dubbed, and transferred to videotape. As news technology changed, film was no longer developed in house, and news crews used mini-cams. From 1983 to 1986, after WNDU moved into a new studio off-campus, Beyond Our Control was videotaped on location with minicams on 3/4" tape.

== Company members ==
Company members who went on to greater fame include Larry Karaszewski (Emmy Award-winning screenwriter and producer The People v. O. J. Simpson: American Crime Story), Daniel Waters (screenwriter, Heathers), David Simkins (screenwriter, Adventures in Babysitting), Diane Werts (film critic, contributor to TV Worth Watching), Dean Norris (SAG Award-winning actor, Breaking Bad), Traci Paige Johnson (animator, creator of Blue's Clues), Phil Frank (journalist, videographer, and documentary producer), Chris Webb (screenwriter, Toy Story 2), Katharine Eliska Kimbriel (fantasy novelist, Night Calls), Corrie Wynns (journalist for WMAQ radio, AP Radio Network and Sheridan Broadcasting Network), Patrick Pritchett, executive assistant for Kathryn Bigelow and James Cameron, poet and English professor, Lee Lodyga (winner of the Grammy Award for Best Historical Album in 2021), and Mary Willems Armstrong (co-author of Encyclopedia of Film Themes, Settings and Series).

An adviser from 1975 to 1977, Donald P. Borchers became a film producer, notable for the 1984 and 2009 versions of Children of the Corn.

=== Dave Williams ===
Dave Williams was born in June 1940 in South Bend. He graduated from Central High School in 1958 and briefly attended Indiana University South Bend. He joined the WNDU Stations as a production assistant in 1960 and was appointed Promotion Manager in 1964.

At age 26, he conceived the idea of Beyond Our Control as a satirical look at the world of television, and, under the auspices of Junior Achievement, produced the program for ten years.

Under Williams' guidance, the show received national acclaim with articles in many newspapers and magazines, including an extensive spread in TV Guide.

Williams died at age 37 during brain surgery for what the surgeon would diagnose as glioblastoma. In a letter written shortly before his surgery, he wrote: "I think it all has to do with working hard and smiling a lot and listening more than you talk and concentrating your effort in one area....So, remember me, please, at my best. Filming, or lecturing, or joking with you, but most of all, laughing. It was the thing we did best and the thing I was always proudest of."
