= Lost episode (disambiguation) =

A lost episode is an episode of a television or radio series which now is, or in the past was, not available for rerun or release on home video or DVD.

- Lost television broadcast, television series or their episodes that are missing

Lost episode may also refer to:

- List of Lost episodes, episodes of the television series Lost
- "The Sponge Who Could Fly", also titled "The Lost Episode", an episode of SpongeBob SquarePants
- "The Lost Episode", an episode of Blue's Clues
