= Interactive television (narrative technique) =

Pretense that television characters interact directly with viewers

Interactive television or interactive TV, sometimes also called pseudo-interactive television to distinguish it from technologically enabled interactive television, is a narrative technique used in television programs to give the viewing audience the impression that they can interact with the on-screen characters, while in actuality they cannot. This narrative technique is often used in children's television. It is a simulated form of audience participation. When employed, characters will often break the fourth wall and ask the viewers to give them advice or the solution to a problem. Characters typically provide a short period of time for the viewers to react, and then proceed as though the viewers have given them the correct answer.

== Examples and history ==
=== Winky Dink and You ===
Airing 1953 to 1957, the Winky Dink and You program was perhaps the first interactive TV show. The central gimmick of the show, praised by Microsoft mogul Bill Gates as "the first interactive TV show", was the use of a "magic drawing screen"—a piece of vinyl plastic that stuck to the television screen via static electricity. A kit containing the screen and various Winky Dink crayons could be purchased for 50 cents. At a climactic scene in every Winky Dink short film, Winky would arrive on a scene that contained a connect-the-dots picture that could be navigated only with the help of viewers. Winky Dink then would prompt the children at home to complete the picture, and the finished result would help him continue the story. Examples included drawing a bridge to cross a river, using an axe to chop down a tree, or creating a cage to trap a dangerous lion. Another use of the interactive screen was to decode messages. An image would be displayed, showing only the vertical lines of the letters of the secret message. Viewers would then quickly trace onto their magic screen, and a second image would display the horizontal lines, completing the text. A final use of the screen was to create the outline of a character with whom Jack Barry would have a conversation. It would seem meaningless to viewers without the screen, further encouraging its purchase.

=== Blue's Clues ===
Premiering in 1996, Blue's Clues was perhaps the most influential interactive TV show. It used pauses that were "long enough to give the youngest time to think, short enough for the oldest not to get bored". The length of the pauses, which was estimated from formative research, gave children enough time to process the information and solve the problem. After pausing, child voice-overs provided the answers so that they were given to children who had not come up with the solution and helped encourage viewer participation. Researcher Alisha M. Crawley and her colleagues stated that although earlier programs sometimes invited overt audience participation, Blue's Clues was "unique in making overt involvement a systematic research-based design element". In 2004, Daniel Anderson said that Blue's Clues "raised the bar" for educational television; he and Variety reported that audience participation became an important part of other educational preschool TV programs such as Dora the Explorer and Sesame Street.
