= Blue's Room =

American children's live-action puppet television series

- Genre: Educational; Puppetry
- Created by: Traci Paige Johnson; Angela C. Santomero
- Based on: Blue's Clues by Traci Paige Johnson; Todd Kessler; Angela C. Santomero
- Developed by: Wendy Harris; Dave Palmer; Jennifer Twomey; Dr. Alice Wilder
- Starring: Leslie Carrara-Rudolph; Anney McKilligan; Victoria Pontecorvo; Peter Linz; Cheryl Blaylock; Joey Mazzarino; Tim Lagasse; Tyler Bunch; Christiana Anbri; Jared Goldsmith; Brianna Gentilella; Alex Hoffman; Noel MacNeal; Marc Petrosino; Donovan Patton; Antonio Ortiz; Matt Vogel; Heather Asch; James Godwin; Polly Smith; Pam Arciero; Lance Chantiles-Wertz; Gabriella Malek
- Opening theme: "(Me and You) In Blue's Room"
- Ending theme: "Way Great Playdate (With You)"
- Composers: Nick Balaban; Michael Rubin; J. Walter Hawkes (associate composer) (season 1)
- Country of origin: United States
- Original language: English
- No. of seasons: 2
- No. of episodes: 17

Production
- Camera setup: Multi-camera
- Running time: 30 minutes
- Production companies: Out of the Blue Enterprises (season 2); Nick Jr. Productions

Original release
- Network: Nickelodeon
- Release: August 2, 2004 – March 29, 2007

Related
- Blue's Clues; Blue's Clues & You!

Blue's Room is an American puppetry children’s television series and a spin-off of Blue's Clues. It was created by Traci Paige Johnson and Angela Santomero. The show aired on Nickelodeon as part of its Nick Jr. block, and originated as short segments on Blue's Clues episodes in season 6.

In March 2015, the entire series was made available as part of the Noggin app. After Noggin removed the series in 2020, Paramount+ (at the time CBS All Access) added the series to its streaming service in January 2021.

== Premise ==
The series centers around the title character and host of the show, Blue, a happy-go-lucky female blue dog who talks and loves to sing, dance, and play with her new friends. Blue often interacts with her friends including Sprinkles, Blue's shy little brother who was introduced in the second season as the co-host; Roar E. Saurus (or simply Roary), a red-orange dinosaur who likes to practice roaring; Frederica, a purple doll who likes to pretend it's her birthday; and Polka Dots, a sea-foam plush toy who creates puzzles for others to solve. Together, they go on adventures, solve different problems, and use their imaginations.

== Characters ==
=== Main ===
- Blue (puppeteered by Leslie Carrara-Rudolph in season 1, then Noel MacNeal in season 2, and voiced by Victoria Pontecorvo) is the title character and hostess of the show. Blue is a happy-go-lucky female blue dog who is Sprinkles' older sister. She talks and loves to sing, dance, and play with her friends. She often greets others by shouting "Hi, you!" and usually asks viewers open-ended questions. Her catchphrase is "Hoop-dee-doo!"
- Polka Dots (originally puppeteered and voiced by Tim Lagasse in the pilot and shorts, then Peter Linz in season 1 and Pam Arciero in season 2) is a sea-foam dog who is Blue's best friend. He creates puzzles for others to solve.
- Frederica "Fred" (puppeteered and voiced by Cheryl Blaylock) is a purple doll who usually pretends that it is her birthday every day. She is one of Blue's good friends.
- Roar "Roary" E. Saurus (puppeteered and voiced by Joey Mazzarino) is a red-orange dinosaur doll who likes to practice roaring.
- Sprinkles (puppeteered and voiced by Joey Mazzarino) is Blue's baby brother and the co-host of the show added to the cast in the second season. Originally a plain white puppy, Sprinkles developed spots upon learning a few things. Sprinkles was created by two sisters, Ashleigh and Lacey Campion through a Nick Jr. competition.
- Doodleboard (originally puppeteered and voiced by Peter Linz in season 1 and James Godwin in season 2) is an easel who doodles and draws to tell the viewer to guess what the object is.
- Dress Up Chest (originally puppeteered and voiced by Tim Lagasse in the pilot and shorts, then Tyler Bunch in the series) is a purple treasure chest who gives the others costumes to wear. He occasionally narrates story segments.
- Boogie Woogie (puppeteered and voiced by Joey Mazzarino) is a jukebox who likes to sing and dance.
- Silly Seat (puppeteered by Marc Petrosino and voiced by Jared Goldsmith) is a polka-dotted chair who tells silly jokes, crazy riddles and other funny things.
- Joe (portrayed by Donovan Patton; guest, season 1; main, season 2) is a human and Blue and Sprinkles' caretaker who is often seen alongside Sprinkles.

=== Recurring ===
- Handy Dandy Journal (voiced by Alex Hoffman) is an animated talking notebook whose face and design resembles that of Polka Dots. Blue writes and draws various thoughts about specific aspects of episodes in his pages.
- Dictionary (voiced by Brianna Gentilella) is a yellow animated book containing many words and their meanings and definitions that Blue looks in almost every day to find out what the Word of the Day is. She has a face and has the ability to speak, similar to all other residents of Blue's Room.
- Key (voiced by Jared Goldsmith) is an animated magical key that Polka Dots keeps in his pocket. He opens Dress Up Chest's lock and is colored gold and orange.
- Moona (voiced by Christiana Anbri) is an animated green and blue-colored fairy made of crescent shapes who tells Blue it is time to go home and appears at the end of each segment and episode.
- Antonio (portrayed by Antonio Ortiz) is a young boy who sometimes visits Blue and her friends at the playroom.
- Grandma Roary (puppeteered and voiced by Heather Asch) is the elderly grandmother of Roary.
- Cookbook (voiced by Victoria Pontecorvo) is an animated red and white book full of food recipes.
- ABC Puppy (puppeteered by Matt Vogel and voiced by Jared Goldsmith) is a pink puppy who lives in Alphabet City and loves letters.
- Colors Puppy (puppeteered by Noel MacNeal and voiced by Jared Goldsmith) is an orange puppy who lives in Color Town and loves colors.
- Princess of Numbers Puppy (puppeteered by Lisa Buckley and voiced by Christiana Anbri) is a purple puppy who lives in Numbers Kingdom and loves numbers.
- Shapes Puppy (puppeteered by Pam Arciero and voiced by Lance Chantiles-Wertz) is a yellow puppy who lives in Shapes Forest and loves shapes.

== Episodes ==
=== Series overview ===
Season	Episodes	Originally released	
Season	Episodes	First released	Last released
1	6	August 2, 2004	September 17, 2005
2	11	August 6, 2006	March 29, 2007

=== Season 1 (2004–05) ===
No. overall	No. in season	Title	Directed by	Written by	Original release date
1	1	"Snacktime Playdate"	Traci Paige Johnson	Angela C. Santomero	August 2, 2004
Blue asks the viewers what they enjoy most about snacktime. Meanwhile, Dress Up Chest reads a snack-based story called "If You Give a Mouse a Cookie".
2	2	"Fred's Birthday"	Dave Palmer	Angela C. Santomero	November 24, 2004
Fred's birthday, her favorite day of the year, arrives.
3	3	"Holiday Wishes"	Koyalee Chanda	Jennifer Twomey, Nick Balaban & Michael Rubin	December 3, 2004
Blue, Polka Dots, Fred, and Roary learn about winter holidays and await a visit from Antonio and Joe.
4	4	"It's Hug Day!"	Koyalee Chanda & Jonathan Judge	Angela C. Santomero	January 25, 2005
Blue and her playroom friends celebrate "Hug Day," a holiday that resembles Valentine's Day.
5	5	"Beyond Your Wildest Dreams!"	Koyalee Chanda	Wendy Harris	April 18, 2005
Blue uses her imagination to transform the room into fantastic new worlds.
6	6	"The Power of the Alphabet"	Koyalee Chanda & Jonathan Judge	Dr. Alice Wilder	September 17, 2005 (Note: This episode was first released on Alphabet Power VHS/DVD on August 2, 2005.)
Sentient letters visit the room, inspiring Blue to learn more about them.

=== Season 2 (2006–07) ===
No. overall	No. in season	Title	Original release date
7	1	"Meet Blue's Baby Brother"	August 6, 2006
Blue's baby brother is here! Blue and Joe must play a game of "gold clues" (which follows the premise of Blue's Clues) to figure out who Blue's baby brother is. Note: This is a joint episode of Blue's Clues; as such, most of its supporting cast reprises roles. Note 2: This episode was dedicated "In Loving Memory" of Paul Beard, an animator for the last 3 seasons of Blue's Clues who died in a car accident on April 22, 2005.
8	2	"Blue's Farm Playdate"	January 26, 2007
Blue and Sprinkles take care of Old MacDonald's farm while he's gone for the day.
9	3	"Shape Detectives"	February 2, 2007
Shapes from Roary's painting scatter across the room. Note: This episode is a reference to the Blue's Clues book of the same name.
10	4	"Masterpiece Museum"	February 9, 2007
Polka Dots reads about art museums and decides to create one of his own.
11	5	"Sprinkles' Sleepover"	February 16, 2007
Sprinkles is unable to go to sleep. So Blue has to help him find a sleepy game that helps him go to sleep, on their journey, Roary had to do a bedtime story, then, they tried Doodle Doodle Dreams, and now they also try Joe's game, and then Blue's lullaby. Then, Sprinkles found a way to get his sleepy game, saying goodnight game is the key!
12	6	"World Travelers"	February 23, 2007
Blue and Sprinkles travel to exotic locations in search of three magic keys.
13	7	"Mathstronauts!"	March 2, 2007
Blue and Sprinkles search all of outer space to find three missing numbers for the princess' rocket.
14	8	"Away Great Playdate"	March 16, 2007
Blue, Sprinkles, and Joe visit real-life places around the world as they try to return a lost hat to their friend, Jalen.
15	9	"Little Red Riding Blue"	March 27, 2007
Blue and Sprinkles act out "Little Red Riding Hood" as they bring Roary some banana bread.
16	10	"Knights of the Snack Table"	March 28, 2007 (Note: This was first released on Knights of the Snack Table DVD on January 30, 2007.)
Blue and Sprinkles become knights and help King Joe locate his missing dragons.
17	11	"Music Stars"	March 29, 2007
Boogie Woogie overhears Blue and Sprinkles making music and tells them that they could become rock stars.

== See also ==
- Blue's Clues
- Blue's Clues & You!
- Nick Jr.
