= Michael Rubin (composer) =

American musician

- Also known as: Seth O'Hickory
- Born: New York City, NY
- Genres: Film score, electronic, big beat, rock, trip hop
- Occupations: Composer, producer, lyricist, singer, voice actor
- Instrument: Multi-instrumentalist
- Years active: 1993–present
- Label: Murmur Music
- Website: www.Rhumba.pro

Michael Rubin II is an American music producer, composer, voice actor and lyricist best known for his work in children’s television. Rubin has created musical pieces for shows including Bubble Guppies, Blue's Clues (in which he also voiced Mailbox), Mickey Mouse Clubhouse, and Jack's Big Music Show, among others. His songs have been performed by artists including Ray Charles, Patti LaBelle, Macy Gray, Randy Travis, India Arie, Nell Carter, Toni Braxton, Phoebe Snow, and The Persuasions.

== Career ==
Rubin began his professional career making music for advertising. He founded the music production company Murmur Music Inc. in 1993. Murmur created music and sound design for commercials and promotional pieces for American Express, AMC, AT&T, Bell South, Citibank, Coca-Cola, Fisher Price, The Food Network, General Motors, Kraft, Maxwell House, Merck, Motorola, Nabisco, Paramount Pictures, Rockport, Samsung, UPS, VH1, Viacom, Volvo and others. He founded the company Rhumba which encompasses Murmur and Dubway Studios which is run by Al Houghton.

In 1995, Rubin (with writing partner Nick Balaban) created the music and sound design for the pilot episode of Blue's Clues. Rubin and Murmur created the soundtrack for all six seasons of the show as well as music for the traveling theatrical production Blue’s Clues Live, a feature-length direct-to-video movie Blue’s Big Musical Movie, the spin-off Blue’s Room, and other media. Rubin also provided the voice of Mailbox, as well as several other characters such as the Sun, who introduced “The Planet Song” in season two.

In 2007, Murmur Music partnered with Dubway Studios to form Rhumba Recorders, an audio production company for children's media. Shortly after this partnership, Rubin began writing and producing the songs and score for all seasons of the series Bubble Guppies.

Rubin, sometimes under the stage name Seth O'Hickory, has sung and voiced several characters in shows featuring his music. He sang lead vocals as a crab henchman in his song "She's So Mean," featured in the Bubble Guppies episode "Bubble Puppy's Fin-Tastic Fairy Tale."

== Awards and nominations ==
- 2016 Daytime Emmy Award nomination for Outstanding Original Song for “Little Froggie,” from the Bubble Guppies episode "The Running of the Bullfrogs"
- 2014 Daytime Emmy Award winner for Outstanding Music Direction and Composition for the Bubble Guppies (with collaborator John Angier)
- 2012 Annie Award nomination for Outstanding Achievement: Music in an Animated Television/Broadcast Production for the Bubble Guppies episode "Bubble Puppy's Fin-tastic Fairy Tale"
- 2008 Daytime Emmy Award nomination for Outstanding Original Song - Children's & Animated for "Duck 4" on Jack’s Big Music Show
- 2004 Daytime Emmy Award nomination for Outstanding Music Direction and Composition for Blue's Clues

== Personal life ==
Rubin was born to Jewish parents Carol (née Teichman), a chemistry teacher who taught at Schreiber High School and Arnold Rubin, who co-founded RHG Electronics in Deer Park, New York as well as a founding member of Kehillath Shalom synagogue. He grew up in Huntington, New York in Long Island. He married Tamara Hanneman in 1994 and they currently live in New York City.

== Filmography ==
=== Television ===
Year	Show	Music	Network	Notes
1996–2007	Blue's Clues	Composer, lyrics, voice of Mailbox/the Sun	Nick Jr.	along with Nick Balaban
2004–2007	Blue's Room	Composer	Nick Jr.	along with Nick Balaban
2005–2008	Jack's Big Music Show	Composer, lyrics	Noggin/Nick Jr.	
2006–2016	Mickey Mouse Clubhouse	Composer, lyrics "Mousekador Song"	Disney Junior	
2011–2016, 2019–2023	Bubble Guppies	Composer, lyrics	Nick Jr.	along with Nick Balaban for Seasons 1 and 3 only.
2019–2024	Blue's Clues & You!	Composer, original songs	Nick Jr.	along with PT Walkley and Nick Balaban
2025–	Super Duper Bunny League	Composer	Nickelodeon	along with John Angier

=== Film ===
Year	Film	Music	Studio	Notes
2000	Blue's Big Musical Movie	Composer, lyrics, voice of Mailbox	Paramount Pictures, Nick Jr. Productions	along with Nick Balaban

=== Theatrical ===
Year	Show	Music	Notes
1999-2003	Blue's Clues Live!	Composer, lyrics	along with Nick Balaban
