= Traci Paige Johnson =

American animator and voice actress

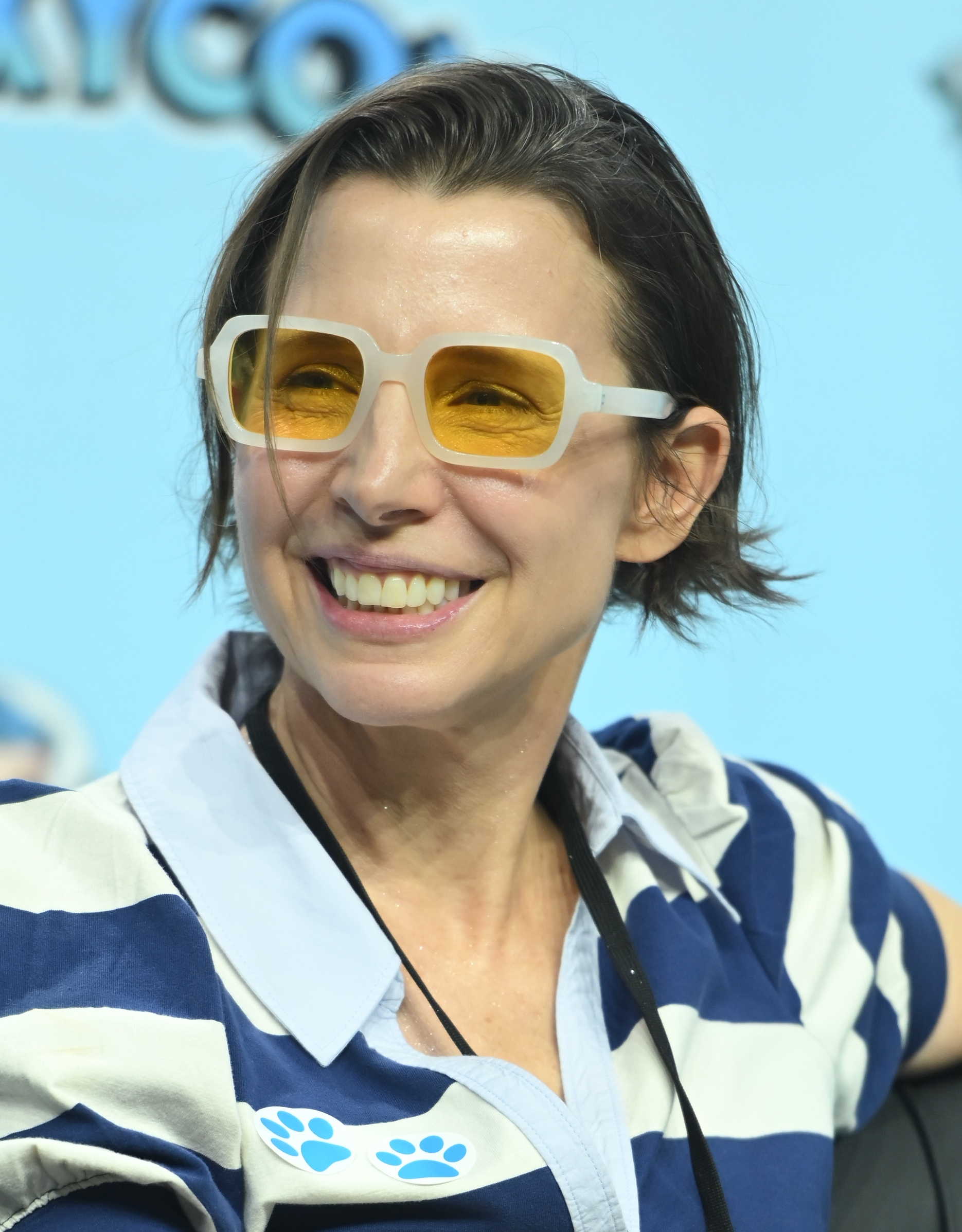
- Johnson at GalaxyCon Richmond in 2024
- Born: New York City, U.S.
- Occupations: Animator, writer, producer, director, voice actress
- Years active: 1991–present
- Spouse: Robert Mowen (m. 1995)
- Children: 3

Traci Paige Johnson is an American animator, writer, producer, director, and voice actress best known for co-creating the television series Blue's Clues (1996–2006), its spin-off Blue's Room (2004–2007), and the reboot series Blue's Clues & You! (2019–2024). She voices the title character for the original and reboot series. She also co-created the television series Gabby's Dollhouse (2021–present).

== Biography ==
While in high school, Johnson was a member of an award-winning student-produced comedy show, Beyond Our Control which ran on the local NBC affiliate, WNDU-TV, at that time owned and operated by the University of Notre Dame.

Johnson earned a degree in radio, television, and film at Northwestern University.

=== Blue's Clues ===
Johnson was a freelance animator in the early 1990s when cable television network Nickelodeon wanted to create a new television show for preschoolers. She already had experience working in children's television. In 1994, Johnson, along with producer Angela Santomero and director Todd Kessler, which Nickelodeon executive Brown Johnson called a "green creative team", created the series Blue's Clues. According to Johnson, she was cast as the voice of Blue, because out of the show's crew, she sounded the most like a dog.

== Personal life ==
She is married to Robert Mowen (another Beyond Our Control alum) and has three sons: Thomas, Oliver, and Emmet.

== Filmography ==
=== Television ===
Title	Role	First aired	Last aired	Co-production	Network	Notes
Blue's Clues	Co-creator / executive producer	September 8, 1996	August 6, 2006	Out of the Blue Enterprises (Note: Uncredited.); Nickelodeon Animation Studio	Nick Jr.	Also the vocal effects of Blue.
Blue's Room	Co-creator / executive producer	August 2, 2004	March 29, 2007	Out of the Blue Enterprises (Note: Uncredited for season 1 only.); Nickelodeon Animation Studio	Nick Jr.	Spin-off of Blue's Clues.
Blue's Clues & You!	Co-creator / executive producer	November 11, 2019	September 27, 2024	9 Story USA; Nickelodeon Animation Studio; Brown Bag Films	Nick Jr.	Also the vocal effects of Blue.
Gabby's Dollhouse	Co-creator / executive producer	January 5, 2021	present	DreamWorks Animation Television	Netflix	First production without 9 Story USA.
Doozie's Doghouse	Co-creator / executive producer	November 9, 2026	present	DreamWorks Animation Television	Netflix	Spin-off of Gabby's Dollhouse.

=== Film ===
Year	Title	Role	Co-production	Notes
2000	Blue's Big Musical Movie	Executive producer	Paramount Home Entertainment; Nickelodeon Animation Studio	Direct-to-video; also the vocal effects of Blue
2022	Blue's Big City Adventure	Producer	Nickelodeon Movies; Nickelodeon Animation Studio; 9 Story Media Group; Brown Bag Films; Boxel Animation; Line by Line Media	Paramount+ original film; also the vocal effects of Blue
2025	Gabby's Dollhouse: The Movie	Executive producer	Universal Pictures; DreamWorks Animation	Theatrical release

== Works cited ==
- Tracy, Diane. (2002). Blue's Clues for Success: The 8 Secrets Behind a Phenomenal Business. New York: Kaplan Publishing. ISBN 0-7931-5376-X.
