= Ron Carlson =

Novelist, short story writer

- Born: Logan, Utah, U.S.
- Education: University of Utah
- Occupation: Novelist
- Writing career
- Language: English
- Genre: Fiction

Ron Carlson is an American novelist, short story writer, and professor.

== Life and career ==
Ronald Carlson was born in Logan, Utah, and grew up in Salt Lake City.

He received a master's degree in English from the University of Utah.

== Career ==
=== Teaching ===
Carlson taught at The Hotchkiss School in Connecticut, where he began his first novel.

He became a professor of English at Arizona State University in 1985, teaching creative writing to undergraduates and graduates, and ultimately becoming director of its Creative Writing program. Carlson then moved to the University of California, Irvine. Carlson was the director of UCI's Creative Writing program until his resignation in 2018.

In August 2018, Carlson was named as having credible evidence of having committed sexual misconduct with a minor student in the 1970s. The report, prepared by the law firm Locke Lord, named seven teachers in all.

=== Writing ===
His short stories originally appeared in The New Yorker, Harper's Magazine, Esquire, and GQ. In addition to his fiction, Carlson has also written for The New York Times Book Review and the Los Angeles Times Book Review.

He wrote of his first "good" story: "I did not understand my story; many times you don’t. It’s not your job to understand or evaluate or edit your work when you first emerge from it. Your duty is to be in love with it, and that defies explanation." (Ron Carlson Writes A Story).

The short story "Keith", from The Hotel Eden, was adapted into a film by Todd Kessler (2008). The independent film starred Jesse McCartney and Elisabeth Harnois.

== Awards ==
He has received a number of honors and awards, including a National Endowment for the Arts Fellowship in Fiction, a National Society of Arts and Letters Award, and the 1993 Ploughshares Cohen Prize.

== Bibliography ==
=== Poetry ===
- Room Service. Red Hen Press. 2012. ISBN 978-1-59709-233-3.

=== Novels ===
- Betrayed by F. Scott Fitzgerald (1977)
- Truants (1981)
- Five Skies. Viking. 2007. ISBN 978-0-670-03850-3. "ron carlson."
- The Signal. Penguin Group. 2009. ISBN 978-0-670-02100-0.
- Return to Oakpine. Viking. 2013. ISBN 978-0-670-02507-7.

=== YA Novel ===
- The Speed of Light, HarperTempest, 2003, ISBN 978-0-380-97837-3

=== Short stories ===
- News of the World (1987)
- Plan B for the Middle Class (1992; a New York Times Best Book that year)
- The Hotel Eden. Penguin Books. 1997. ISBN 978-0-14-027389-2. (an NYT Notable Book)
- At the Jim Bridger. Macmillan. 2002. ISBN 978-0-312-30724-0. (a Los Angeles Times 2002 best book)
- A Kind of Flying. W. W. Norton & Company. 2003. ISBN 978-0-393-32479-2. "ron carlson."

=== Non-fiction ===
- Ron Carlson Writes a Story (2007), subtitled: "From the first glimmer of an idea to the final sentence."

=== Anthologies ===
- Best American Short Stories
- Sudden Fiction
- Best of the West Epoch
- In Our Lovely Deseret: Mormon Fictions
- The North American Review
- The O'Henry Prize Series
- The Pushcart Prize Anthology
- Norton Anthology of Short Fiction.
