= Blue's Clues =

American children's television show

- Genre: Educational
- Created by: Traci Paige Johnson; Todd Kessler; Angela C. Santomero
- Presented by: Steve Burns (seasons 1–4); Donovan Patton (seasons 5–6); Kevin Duala (UK)
- Voices of: Traci Paige Johnson; Nick Balaban; Michael Rubin
- Opening theme: "Blue's Clues Theme" (seasons 1–4); "Another Blue's Clues Day" performed by Donovan Patton (seasons 5–6)
- Ending theme: "So Long Song" (seasons 1–5); "Goodbye Song" (season 6)
- Composers: Nick Balaban; Michael Rubin
- Country of origin: United States
- Original language: English
- No. of seasons: 6
- No. of episodes: 143 (list of episodes)

Production
- Executive producers: Todd Kessler; Angela C. Santomero; Traci Paige Johnson; Jennifer Twomey
- Running time: 21–26 minutes
- Production companies: Nickelodeon Creative Labs (seasons 1–2); Nickelodeon Animation Studios (seasons 3–6); Nick Jr. Productions

Original release
- Network: Nickelodeon
- Release: September 8, 1996 – August 6, 2006

Related
- Blue's Room; Blue's Clues & You!

Blue's Clues is an American interactive educational children's television series created by Traci Paige Johnson, Todd Kessler, and Angela C. Santomero. It premiered on Nickelodeon through the Nick Jr. block on September 8, 1996, and concluded its run on August 6, 2006, with a total of six seasons and 143 episodes. The original host of the live-action animated show was Steve Burns, who left in 2002 and was replaced by Donovan Patton (as "Joe") for the fifth and sixth seasons. The show follows an animated blue-spotted dog named Blue as she leaves a trail of clues/paw prints for the host and the viewer to figure out her plans for the day.

The producers and creators combined concepts from child development and early-childhood education with innovative animation and production techniques that helped their viewers learn, using research conducted thirty years since the debut of Sesame Street in the United States. Unlike earlier preschool shows, Blue's Clues presented material in a narrative format instead of a magazine format, used repetition to reinforce its curriculum, structured every episode the same way, and revolutionized the genre by inviting their viewers' involvement.

Research was part of the creative and decision-making process in the production of the show, and was integrated into all aspects and stages of the creative process. Blue's Clues was the first cutout animation series for preschoolers in the United States and resembles a storybook in its use of primary colors and its simple construction paper shapes of familiar objects with varied colors and textures. Its home-based setting is familiar to American children, but has a look unlike previous children's TV shows.

Upon debuting, Blue's Clues received critical acclaim. It became the highest-rated show for preschoolers on American commercial television, and was significant to Nickelodeon's growth. The show has been syndicated in 120 countries and translated into 15 languages. Regional versions of the show featuring local hosts have been produced in other countries. By 2002, Blue's Clues had received several awards for excellence in children's programming, educational software and licensing, and had been nominated for nine Emmy Awards.

A live production of Blue's Clues, which used many of the production innovations developed by the show's creators, toured the United States. starting in 1999. As of 2002, over two million people had attended over 1,000 performances. A spin-off called Blue's Room premiered in 2004. A revival of the series titled Blue's Clues & You!, hosted by Josh Dela Cruz premiered on Nickelodeon on November 11, 2019, and ended on September 27, 2024. The show's extensive use of research in its development and production process inspired several research studies that have provided evidence for its effectiveness as a learning tool.

== History ==
=== Background ===
By 1990, parents, teachers and media experts had been criticizing "the lack of quality fare for children on commercial television" for many years. Up to that point, PBS was the only source for quality children's television; other broadcasters voluntarily set educational standards for their programming and "were expected to regulate themselves", but it led to little change in the quality of children's programs. By the time Blue's Clues premiered in 1996, there was a large number of TV shows for children, but most of them were violent and designed to sell action toys and other products; as co-creator Angela C. Santomero put it, "a vehicle for toy-based 'commercials'". According to author Diane Tracy in her 2002 book Blue's Clues for Success, "The state of children's television was pretty dismal". (Note: Tracy's book is a business guide based on Nickelodeon and the history of Blue's Clues. Publishers Weekly noted the value in Tracy's discussion of the creators' and producers' business model but found Tracy's tone "less than optimal for discerning executive readers".)

There was little incentive for producing high-quality children's television until 1990, when Congress passed the Children's Television Act (CTA), which "required that networks be held accountable for the quality of children's programming or risk losing their license". The CTA set no hourly quotas and left it to the Federal Communications Commission (FCC) to determine compliance to the law, so little positive improvements were made. In 1996, the FCC passed additional regulations, including requiring broadcasters to, in a provision called "the Three-Hour rule", air at least three hours of children's programming per week between the hours of 07:00 to 22:00, and that they be tagged with an E/I (Educational and Informational) logo so that children and their families could easily find the programs. The cable network Nickelodeon, which was recognized, along with PBS, as a leader in the creation and production of high-quality children's programming, was not required to comply with federal regulations to provide informative or educational content, but did so anyway before the CTA became law.

According to Heather L. Kirkorian and her fellow researchers Ellen Wartella and Daniel Anderson in 2008, since television appeared in homes beginning in the mid-20th century, critics have often expressed concern about its impact on viewers, especially children, who as Kirkorian argued, are "active media users" by the age of three. Researchers believed that there were links between television viewing and children's cognitive and learning skills and that what children watched may be more important than how much they watched it. She reported that up until the 1980s, researchers had only an implicit theory about how viewers watched television, and that young children were cognitively passive viewers and controlled by "salient attention-eliciting features" like sound effects and fast movement. As a result, most researchers believed that television interfered with cognition and reflection and as a result, children could not learn from and process television. In the early 1980s, however, then-new theories about how young children watch television suggested that attention in children as young as two-years old were largely guided by program content.

=== Conception ===
In the mid-1990s, Nickelodeon, looking to create programming for preschoolers, hired a team of three producers, Angela C. Santomero, Todd Kessler, and Traci Paige Johnson, to create a new television program for young children. According to The New York Times, Kessler was the first creator to be brought on board to the project. Kessler, a freelance Nickelodeon producer at the time, had previously worked on Sesame Street, but he disliked its format and thought that it was too static and not visual enough. Santomero, who named Fred Rogers as a major influence, worked at Nickelodeon as a researcher and Johnson was a freelance artist and animator. Santomero later said that they "were young, and Nickelodeon took a chance on us".

Daniel R. Anderson of the University of Massachusetts at Amherst, who Canadian author Malcolm Gladwell called one of the "pioneering television researchers", was an adviser for the new show. Nickelodeon had hired Anderson as an adviser for its Nick Jr. block of preschool programs starting in 1993, although Santomero had already been getting his input about research informally. When Nickelodeon enlisted her to co-create Blue's Clues, he came on in a more formal capacity. Anderson later said that he "jumped at the chance" to serve as an advisor for Blue's Clues because "Nickelodeon was interested in providing programs that would actually benefit preschoolers rather than merely entertain them". Anderson also stated that the choice to produce the show as overtly and clearly educational was a departure for Nickelodeon and for any commercial network. According to research conducted by Nickelodeon, parents of preschool aged children wanted the shows they watched to be educational.

Santomero, Kessler, and Johnson met in a conference room at Viacom in New York for a month to create Blue's Clues. According to Santomero, the creators of Blue's Clues wanted to create a children's television show that was "something very simple and graphic and slow", emphasized social and emotional skills, treated children like they were smart, and helped them feel empowered. The character Blue was originally conceived as a cat, and the name of the show was to be Blue Prints, but the show's name was changed and Blue became a dog because Nickelodeon was already producing a show about a cat and because, as Anderson reported, children who watched the pilot, which was used for testing, "almost universally called the show Blue's Clues". Even though most children's television shows at the time were built around male characters, Blue was female and as The New York Times put it, "never wore a bow".

Kessler handled the show's "computer-based production", Santomero the research, and Johnson the design. By 2001, the show's research team, which worked collaboratively with the show's producers and creators, consisted of director of research Alice Wilder, who joined the Blue's Clues team shortly after the show's debut, Alison Sherman, Karen Leavitt, and Koshi Dhingra. (Note: According to Tracy, Wilder, who had a doctorate in educational psychology, reinvented the role of research in children's television, and helped train the writers and animators to trust and use research. Wilder also developed the curriculum that guided the program's script development and implemented its formative research.) They were given $150,000 to produce a pilot, about a quarter of the budget for other Nickelodeon shows at the time, which was used in 1995 to test the show's interactive elements with its potential audience. The pilot was considered lost, but in 2021, Santomero announced that she owned a copy of it, and that the pilot was filmed in 1994. In September 2023, the full pilot unexpectedly surfaced online, putting an end to the nearly two-decade long search for it.

=== Premiere and later history ===
Blue's Clues premiered in the United States on September 8, 1996. The premiere was the highest-rated premiere of any Nickelodeon program, and the show became crucial to the network's growth. Scholar Norma Pecora called Blue's Clues the "cornerstone" of Nickelodeon's educational programming. By the end of 1997, it was the highest-rated show for preschoolers on commercial television, and was the third-highest rated show behind children's public television shows; Barney & Friends and Arthur. Within 18 months of its premiere, Blue's Clues was as well known among the parents of preschoolers as more established children's shows such as Sesame Street and Barney & Friends. In 2002, Tracy reported that it was one of the highest-rated shows for preschoolers, was preschool children and their parents' favorite cable preschool program, was viewed by approximately 13.7 million viewers each week, and aired in about 60 countries.

In 2000, after 75 episodes, with "no fanfare" and no announcement from Nickelodeon, co-creator and co-producer Todd Kessler left Blue's Clues and the network to pursue other projects. He told The New York Times that he had "no hard feelings" regarding his departure. Kessler continued to be listed as an executive producer for the run of the show and for any future spin-offs. Also in 2000, CBS, which was also owned by Viacom, began airing the show as part of the centerpiece of its Saturday and Sunday morning children's programming. In 2004, Blue's Clues stopped production, which Santomero called "devastating", although it continued to air on Nickelodeon, and a spin-off, Blue's Room, was launched in the same year. It featured puppets, as well as the original show's second host. Blue's Clues celebrated its 10-year anniversary in 2006 with a prime time special and the release of a DVD entitled "Blue's Biggest Stories", which consisted of eight half-hour episodes spanning the show's history.

In November 2019, a reboot of Blue's Clues premiered. The show, called Blue's Clues & You!, is hosted by Josh Dela Cruz and features many of the same characters in the original show. Steve Burns, the original show's first host, serves as a writer and director on the new show; he has also made guest appearances, along with the original show's second host Donovan Patton, and participated in the casting of Dela Cruz.

=== Casting ===
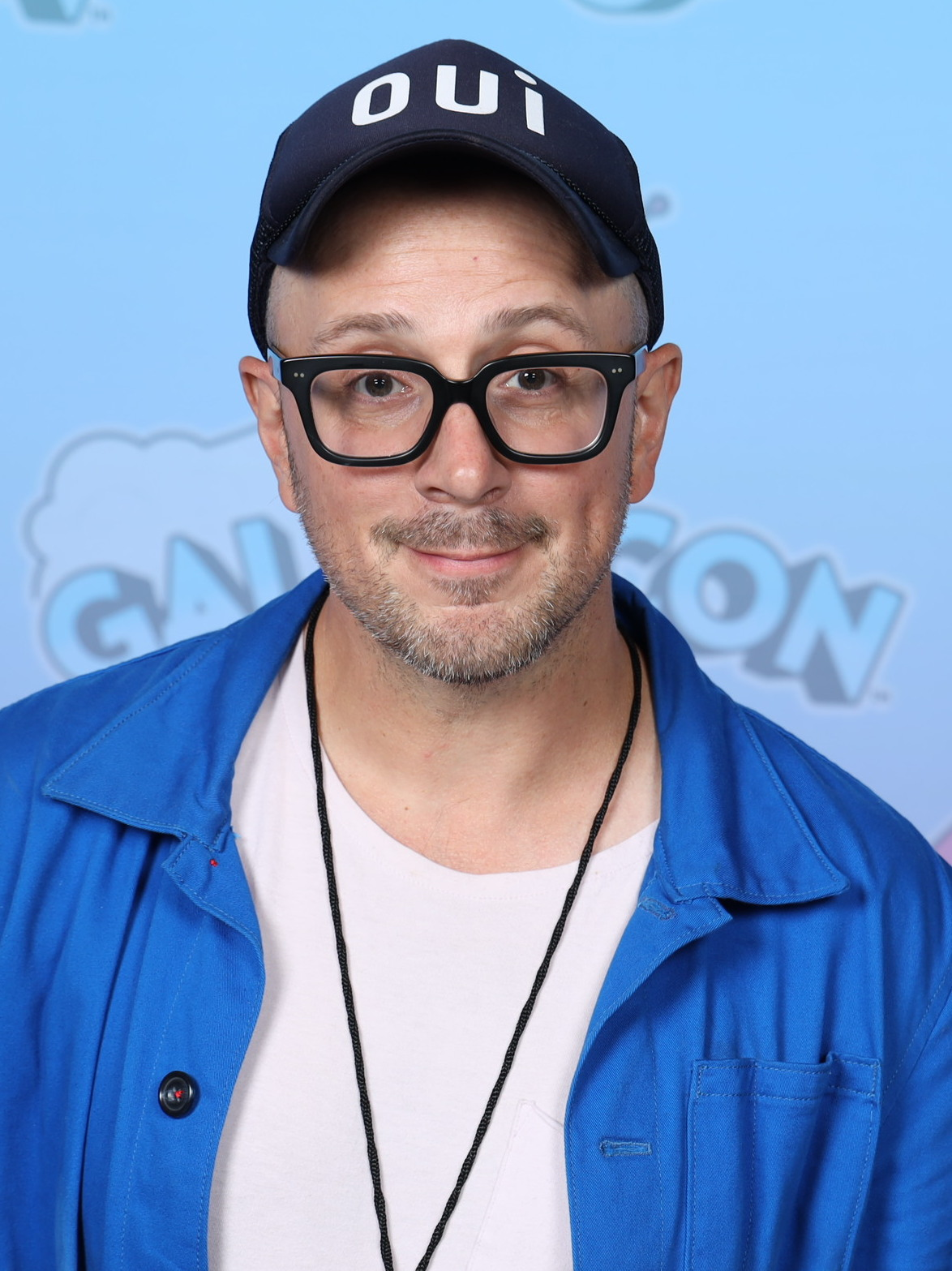
Original host Steve Burns (pictured in 2023)

The most important casting decision was that of the host, the only human character in the show. The host's role was to empower and challenge the show's young viewers, to help increase their self-esteem, and to strongly connect with them through the television screen. The producers originally wanted a female host. After months of research and over 1,000 auditions, they hired actor/performer Steve Burns based on the strength of his audition. Burns received the strongest and most enthusiastic response in tests with the young audience. Johnson said what made Burns a great children's TV host was that "he didn't want to be a children's host ... He loved kids, but he didn't want to make a career out of it". Burns decided to leave the show in the autumn of 2000, departing in January 2001. He was in over 100 episodes of Blue's Clues when his final episodes aired in April 2002. Burns himself stated, "I knew I wasn't gonna be doing children's television all my life, mostly because I refused to lose my hair on a kid's TV show, and it was happenin' – fast."

After the producers conducted 1,500 auditions, Burns was replaced by actor Donovan Patton, who played Steve's brother Joe, introduced to the audience in articles in Nickelodeon's magazine and on its webpage and an arc of three episodes. Burns' departure generated "outlandish rumors" and was featured in a Time magazine story. Patton had never seen Blue's Clues before he auditioned for the part, and like Burns, who worked with him to help him prepare for the role, was also popular with preschool test audiences. The producers later reported that finding someone who could match Burns' "deceptively simple performance" was difficult. Patton became a "household name", although as Johnson stated, his character was named Joe because "Donovan was a little too hard on a preschooler's tongue". According to The New York Times, Patton played the role more relaxed and "taller" than Burns.

Even though research demonstrated that children tend to pay less attention to adult male voices, Burns and Patton were chosen as the program's hosts because they were popular with their audience. Daniel Anderson insisted that Burns and Patton were the best actors for their roles out of the hundreds who auditioned, calling them "actors who could mime as demanded by the mixed action and animation format", and reported that there was no evidence that children paid less attention to them than to other parts of the program. He also said that Burns and Patton overcame what he called "attentional bias against men" in three ways: by behaving energetically and childlike; by breaking the fourth wall and talking directly to the audience, often by looking directly into the camera and asking their audience, "Will you help?", and like Fred Rogers, forming a direct relationship to the audience; and by "always doing something". Anderson insisted that by forming a relationship with the audience, the actors' male voice became cues to the audience to pay attention and stated that it was the hosts' style of presentation that determined child attention.

Johnson was cast as Blue's voice because, of the show's crew, she was able to sound the most like a dog. Nick Balaban, who wrote the music for the show along with Michael Rubin, was cast as the voice of Mr. Salt. Balaban initially used a Brooklyn accent for Mr. Salt before settling on a French accent. Rubin also provided the voice of Mailbox.

== Format ==
In The Tipping Point, author Gladwell, who called Blues Clues the "'stickiest'—meaning the most irresistible and involving—television show ever", described its format:

Steve, the host, presents the audience with a puzzle involving Blue, the animated dog ... To help the audience unlock the puzzle, Blue leaves behind a series of clues, which are objects marked with one of her paw prints. In between the discovery of the clues, Steve plays a series of games—mini-puzzles—with the audience that are thematically related to the overall puzzle ... As the show unfolds, Steve and Blue move from one animated set to another, jumping through magical doorways, leading viewers on a journey of discovery, until, at the end of the story, Steve returns to the living room. There, at the climax of the show, he sits down in a comfortable chair to think—a chair known, of course, in the literal world of Blue's Clues, as the Thinking Chair. He puzzles over Blue's three clues and attempts to come up with the answer.

Nickelodeon researcher Daniel R. Anderson called the structure of Blue's Clues a game that presented its viewers with increasingly challenging and developmentally appropriate problems to solve. Early episodes focused on basic subjects such as colors and numbers, whereas later programs focused on more complex topics such as math, physics, anatomy, and astronomy. The show's producers believed that comprehension and attention were strongly connected, so they wrote the episodes to encourage and increase their viewers' attention. They used content and production characteristics such as pacing which gave children time to respond, as well as "camera techniques, children's voices, musical cues, sound effects, clear transitions, repeatable dialogue, and visuals". Participation, in the form of spoken or physical response from the audience, and the mastery of thinking skills were encouraged by the use of repetition, both within the structure of individual episodes and across multiple episodes. The producers used a variety of formal features, which were auditory, and content features, which consisted of invitations given to the audience. The features were also in the form of both recurrent and unique formats and content. The purpose of the recurrent formats and content, which were similar in every episode, was to increase viewers' attention, comprehension, and participation during key educational lessons.

Nickelodeon originally aired the same episode daily for five days before showing the next one. The producers believed this telecast strategy empowered young children by giving them many opportunities to master the content and problems presented to them. Scholar Norma Pecora considered the broadcast strategy of airing the same episode for five consecutive days in a week "sound educational thinking", because children tend to watch the same episodes multiple times and learn from repetition, and "economically clever" because the network could air 2.5 hours with one episode over five days.

== Episodes ==
Season	Episodes	Originally released	
Season	Episodes	First released	Last released
Pilot		1994	
1	19	September 8, 1996	October 27, 1997
2	21	November 3, 1997	February 15, 1999
3	32	March 14, 1999	January 13, 2002
4	24	April 9, 2001	August 1, 2006
5	36	April 30, 2002	December 12, 2003
6	11	February 8, 2004	August 6, 2006

== Educational goals ==
The creators and producers' mission of Blue's Clues was to "empower, challenge, and build the self-esteem of preschoolers ... while making them laugh". According to Anderson and his colleagues, the show's curriculum was based on "inherent respect for preschoolers and their ability to think and learn while having fun". Anderson and his colleagues stated that Blue's Clues was created with the question: What does television teach young children? Kessler, Santomero, and Johnson were influenced by Mister Rogers' Neighborhood and by Sesame Street, the first children's television program to create a detailed and comprehensive educational curriculum developed from research and use developmental theory, child development, learning theory, and research. According to Anderson, it was essential that the writers and creators of Blue's Clues have background and experience in early childhood development theory and research in order to ensure that the audience understood the dialogue, game, and recurrent program elements in each episode.

Like Sesame Street, formative research was an important part of the development of each episode of Blue's Clues, which was included in the show's production budgets. "We wanted to learn from Sesame Street and take it one step further", Santomero said. The producers and creators used formative research, which the producers called their "secret sauce", during all aspects of the program's creative and decision-making process, and Nickelodeon provided the funding to support it. In addition to a curriculum that emphasized reasoning skills relevant to preschoolers' everyday lives, the producers wanted to include audience participation, called by Variety its "call and response style", that encouraged problem solving, mastery of the information presented, positive reinforcement, and prosocial messages. They believed that a strong sense of self-esteem, which they sought to develop in their viewers, was linked to independent thinking and thinking skills. Anderson stated, "Age-appropriate pacing and explicit directions give children an opportunity to have a voice". Anderson and his colleagues compared audience participation on the program with hands-on practice provided by a caregiver. The show's producers believed, despite the viewpoints of past researchers, that children were intellectually active while watching television.

Sesame Street tested a third of its episodes, but the Blue's Clues research team field tested every episode three times with children aged between two and six in a variety of preschool environments such as Head Start programs, public schools, and private day care centers, in order to ascertain their abilities, interests, and knowledge, to ensure the mission and philosophy of the program, and to ensure balanced demographic groups. There were three phases of testing: content evaluation, video evaluations, and content analysis. In their tests of the pilot, conducted throughout the New York City area with over 100 children aged from three to seven, they found that as the pilot progressed, children's attention was captured and sustained, and they became excited and actively participated, standing to get closer to the television and speaking to the host. The producers and researchers also consulted outside advisers, who were chosen based on their expertise and the needs of each script. As Anderson stated, the formative research team served "as a liaison between the feedback provided by the preschoolers and outside advisers and the production team, including writers, talent, producers, directors, element artists, and animators".

When I believed we had the best show on television that could educate preschoolers and positively impact their lives, I was relentless. I wanted so much to give kids a television show that celebrates how smart they are, because I truly believe they are brilliant. I also wanted to create a show that would help pre-schoolers feel good about themselves".

— Blue's Clues co-creator and producer Angela Santomero

Blue's Clues was designed and produced on the assumption that since children are cognitively active when they watch television, a television program could be an effective method of scientific education for young children by telling stories through pictures and by modeling behavior and learning. These learning opportunities included the use of mnemonics in the form of mantras and songs, and what Tracy called "metacognitive wrap-up" at the end of each episode, in which the lessons were summarized and rehearsed. The producers wanted to foster their audience's sense of empowerment by eliciting their assistance for the show's host and by encouraging their identification with the character Blue, who served as a stand-in for the typical preschooler.

The thinking games presented in each episode used what Anderson called "a layered approach" that took the varying capabilities of the audience into account. Santomero said that they used scaffolding and that layering was inherent in the script and design of each game. They purposely presented the problem presented in increasing levels of difficulty, to prevent children from feeling frustrated and to master concepts, experience success, and feel empowered to attempt to solve more challenging concepts presented to them. The producers' goal was that all viewers understood the problem, even if they did not know how to solve it. As a result, the child was temporary frustrated by not knowing the answer because after giving them time to come up with it, child voice-overs provided the answers for them, so that they learned the correct answers, even if they were unable to come up with them. If the child was able to come up with the answers, however, they felt "part of a larger, knowing, child audience" when their answers were confirmed by the voice-overs. The child voice-overs also helped viewers maintain high levels of attention during critical educational portions of the episode and modelled the audience involvement encouraged by the program. The audience was told how they could help problem-solve by the host explaining how, by the child voice-overs modeling verbal participation, and by giving them enough time to respond. According to Johnson, the slow pace of the program was challenging for television directors used to the fast pace of television production and for parents, who praised the pace but expressed concerns that their children would find it boring.

Sesame Street reflected the prevailing view that preschoolers had short attention spans; it featured a magazine-like format consisting of varied segments. Based on research conducted over the 30 years since the launch of Sesame Street by theorists like Anderson, the producers of Blue's Clues wanted to develop a show that took advantage of children's intellectual and behavioral activity when watching television. Previous children's television programs presented their content with little input from their viewers, but Blue's Clues was one of the first children's shows to actively invite its viewers' involvement. Its creators believed that if children were more involved in what they were viewing, they would attend to its content longer than previously expected—for up to a half hour—and learn more. They also dropped the magazine format for a more traditional narrative format. As Variety magazine stated, "The choice for Blue's Clues became to tell one story, beginning to end, camera moving left-to-right like reading a storybook, transitions from scene to scene as obvious as the turning of a page". Every episode of Blue's Clues was structured in this way.

The pace of Blue's Clues was deliberate, and its material was presented clearly. Similar to Mister Rogers' Neighborhood, this was done was in the use of pauses that were "long enough to give the youngest time to think, short enough for the oldest not to get bored". The length of the pauses, which was estimated from formative research, gave children enough time to process the information and solve the problem. After pausing, child voice-overs provided the answers so that they were given to children who had not come up with the solution and helped encourage viewer participation. Researcher Alisha M. Crawley and her colleagues stated that although earlier programs sometimes invited overt audience participation, Blue's Clues was "unique in making overt involvement a systematic research-based design element". Blue's Clues also differed from Sesame Street by not using cultural references or humor aimed at adults, as this could confuse preschoolers but, instead, made the show literal, which the producers felt would better hold the children's attention. The structure of each episode was repetitive, designed to provide preschoolers with comfort and predictability. Repetition of the same skills used in different contexts or games within and across episodes encouraged the mastery of thinking skills and the approach to content within an episode was consistent with learning theory that emphasized situated cognition and provided all viewers, no matter their age or abilities, with repeated opportunities to try to solve the problems presented.

Since preschoolers tend to have difficulty understanding transitions, especially when they involve active inferences about time, space, and characters' perspective, the program's producers minimized transitions that required inference so that their viewers' intellectual resources could be devoted to understanding the episode's content. They accomplished this goal by limiting the number of settings during an episode and with the transitions occurring only between them and signaled by dialogue and enough time and information necessary to process them. The primary settings in Blue's Clues were the host's house and backyard, and transitions between them were usually done continuously, without the use of cuts. If transitions were accompanied by cuts, it was done by the host moving to and through a door and continuing as he entered the front or backyard. The biggest transition in Blue's Clues occurred when the host "skidooed" and jumped into a picture or book, done in a magical way with plenty of warning that it was coming, and began and ended in the new environment. Anderson reported that children clearly understood and enjoyed the skidoo transition. Santomero reported that the skidoo transition was inspired by the use of the trolley in Mister Rogers' Neighborhood, which also served as a transition device.

== Production ==
The producers and writers of Blue's Clues used content and television production techniques such as camera techniques, the use of children's voices, musical cues, sound effects, repeatable dialogue, and visuals in order to encourage and increase comprehension and attention. Blue's Clues was set in the home—the environment that was most familiar and secure for preschoolers—and looked like no other children's television show. The theme and topic of each episode, which was in development, from idea development to final production, for approximately one year, was chosen by the research team. Writers created a goal sheet, which identified their objectives based on the show's curriculum and audience needs. According to show researcher Koshi Dhingra and her colleagues, the integration of writing and researching Blue's Clues was unique and involved "an extremely collaborative process". Script drafts, once developed and approved by the show's creators and research team, were tested at public and private schools, day care centers, preschools, and Head Start programs by three researchers, who would narrate the story in the form of a storybook and take notes about the children's responses. The writers and creators revised the scripts based on this feedback. A rough video, in which the host performed from the revised script in front of a blue screen with no animation, was filmed and retested. The script was revised based on the audiences' responses, tested a third time with animation and music added, and incorporated into future productions.

According to Dhingra and her colleagues, the researchers represented the preschool viewer. After coming up with an idea for an episode, the writers met with Alice Wilder, head of the research department for Blue's Clues, to discuss their idea. The research department and writers then discussed if the topic and approach to the topic was appropriate for preschoolers, and if they accepted it, the content of the episode was further developed. They would often bring in outside consultants who were experts in the subject matter and the processes in teaching it to preschoolers. Wilder considered the researchers experts in how the concepts they wanted to present would translate to the medium of television rather than in a classroom or museum, but they considered preschoolers, who evaluated each script from their perspective, to be their " true experts". The writer took the information they gathered from the research department, preschoolers, and experts and wrote a treatment, or detailed outline of the script, which included goals for the entire episode and for each game. The writers, Wilder, and the research team had a treatment meeting, which Dhingra and her colleagues described as "an organized creative brainstorm", which was rooted in the philosophy and mission of the show, the art of good storytelling, and the point of view of their viewers. The goal of the treatment meeting was to give the writers everything they needed to create a workable second draft of the episode script, and to ensure that it fit the needs of their viewers.

The researchers brought in experts, if needed, and then, at the second draft stage, interviewed preschoolers. Preschooler testing was conducted in three rounds: the concept test, and video test, and content analysis. The producers and creators of the show, during their interviews of preschoolers, created a rough version of the episode, with the host and preliminary animations and backgrounds, and showed it to preschoolers to gain further feedback and was designed to assess their reactions to the content and visuals. According to Dhingra and her colleagues, the greatest strengths of the development of all episodes of Blue's Clues were the high levels of collaboration between all departments involved in the creation of the show, the clearly defined strategies they used to effectively include their preschool viewers in the development process, and their use of the mission, philosophy, and structure of the program to create and develop each episode.

Most of the show's production was done in-house, rather than by outside companies as was customary for children's TV shows at the time. Blue's Clues was filmed in a studio in Tribeca, Manhattan, New York. The show's creators understood that the look and visual design of the show would be integral to children's attachment with it. Johnson expanded on the "cut-out" style she had created during her college years. Blue's Clues was the first animated series for preschoolers that utilized simple cut-out construction paper shapes of familiar objects with a wide variety of colors and textures, resembling a storybook. Johnson also used primary colors and organized each room of the home setting into groups. The green-striped shirt worn by the show's original host, Steve, was inspired by Fruit Stripe gum. The goals were to make the show look natural and simplistic; as Tracy put it, "freshly cut and glued together with a vivid array of textures, colors, and shadows" similar to picture book illustrations. The program's design was influenced by an understanding of the cognitive, emotional, and social capabilities of preschoolers. For example, the purpose of the notebook in Blue's Clues, which was used to record the clues presented throughout an episode, was to teach preschoolers how to overcome their poorly developed memory skills by using external mnemonic aids and lists. The music, produced by composer Michael Rubin and pianist Nick Balaban, was simple, had a natural sound, and exposed children to a wide variety of genres and instruments. Rubin and Balaban used Anderson's research about the importance of using auditory cues to increase children's attention and inserted auditory signatures to encourage the audience to pay attention to the episodes "at critical junctures for learning". According to Tracy, the music empowered children and gave the show "a sense of playfulness, a sense of joy, and a sense of the fantastic". Rubin and Balaban encouraged the musicians who performed for the show to improvise.

The host performed each episode in front of a "blue screen", with animation added later. The show's digital design department combined high-tech and low-tech methods by creating and photographing three-dimensional objects, then cutting them out and placing them into the background, which made the objects look more real and added perspective and depth. Johnson hired artist Dave Palmer and production company Big Pink to create the animation, which was at that time a new technology, from simple materials like fabric, paper, or pipe-cleaners, and scan them into a Macintosh computer so that they could be animated using inexpensive computer software such as Media 100, Ultimatte, Photoshop, and After Effects. (Note: Adobe Systems was surprised that their products were being used in the production of a children's television show. According to Tracy, "Not even the developers of the software knew it could be used to create character animation on the scale Blue's Clues was using it", Adobe later requested that the show's animators join their client development group, and made several changes and improvements to their software as a result.) instead of being repeatedly redrawn as in traditional animation. Johnson credited Kessler with the idea of using the Macintosh. The result was something that looked different from anything else on television at the time, and the producers were able to animate two episodes in eight weeks, as compared to the sixteen weeks necessary to create a single episode by traditional methods. Their process looked like traditional cut-out animation, but was faster, more flexible, and less expensive, and it allowed them to make changes based on feedback from test audiences. Unlike traditional animation environments, which tended to be highly structured, the animators were given information about the characters and goals of the scenes they would animate, and then given the freedom to work out the timing and look of each scene themselves, as long as their creations were true to the characters and to the story. By 1999, the show's animation department consisted of Palmer, twenty animators, eleven digital designers, and five art directors and model makers. By 2002, Nickelodeon had built a "state-of-the-art" $6 million digital animation studio that housed 140 people, including 70 animators.

== Reception ==
Ratings for Blue's Clues were high during its first season, and it was Nickelodeon's most popular preschool program. It has been described as the first commercial television show for preschoolers that was both educational and profitable. Its creators met regularly with businesses that developed Blue's Clues merchandise and products to ensure toys that were educational and met "the same high ... standards as the show". Products, like the show, were heavily tested prior to marketing. (Note: In order to keep the integrity of the Blue's Clues brand intact, a branding guide "bible" called Blue's Clues 101 was created that explained the show and provided examples of products that both correctly and incorrectly reflected it.) Blue's Clues had sold almost 40 million units of its 45 VHS and DVD titles by 1998 and generated over $1 billion in product licensing in 2000. More than ten million Blue's Clues books were in print by 2001 and over three million copies of six CD-ROM titles based on the show had been sold. Seven Blue's Clues titles sold at least 1 million copies each. The show's first direct-to-video production was Blue's Big Musical Movie (2000), featuring Ray Charles and The Persuasions; it received mostly positive reviews and has sold over 3 million copies since 2006. The launch of Blue's Clues products at FAO Schwarz's flagship store in New York City was the most successful product launch in the store's history and was attended by over 7,000 people. Steve Burns' final episode in 2002 was viewed by 1.9 million preschoolers and received a 47 percent share of the overall audience. By 2002, Blue's Clues had received several awards for children's programming, educational software, and licensing. It won eight consecutive Emmys between 1998 and 2005 and won a Peabody Award in 2001.

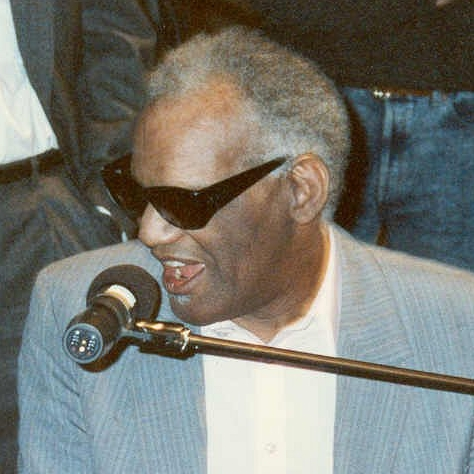
Ray Charles (pictured in 1990) appeared in the popular Blue's Clues feature-length special Blue's Big Musical Movie. It was his final film role prior to his death four years later, in 2004.

Starting in 1999, a live production of Blue's Clues toured the U.S. to positive reviews. As of 2002, over 2 million people had attended over 1,000 performances. The creators of the TV show were involved in all aspects of the live show, aiming to translate the bond between the TV show's audience and its cast to the stage. The creators chose Jonathan Hochwald as the live show's producer, Gip Hoppe as its director, and Dave Gallo as its set designer. Neither Hoppe nor Gallo had any previous experience in children's theater. Nick Balaban and Michael Rubin, who wrote the music for the TV show, composed the live show's soundtrack. The producers were concerned with children's response to the host, who was played by Tom Mizer (a different actor than the host of the TV show), but his young audience enthusiastically accepted and embraced him. Actors were encouraged to improvise and respond to the audience, which resulted in changes throughout the show's run. The show's script included humor that both children and their parents could enjoy.

Regional versions of the show, featuring native hosts, have been produced in other countries. Kevin Duala hosted the United Kingdom version and the show became part of pop culture in South Korea. In total, Blue's Clues was syndicated in 120 countries, and was translated into 15 languages. In 2000, it became one of the first preschool shows to incorporate American Sign Language into its content, with between five and ten signs used consistently in each episode. Blue's Clues won an award from the Greater Los Angeles Agency on Deafness (GLAD) for promoting deaf awareness in the media.

== Cultural influence and impact ==
The extensive use of research in the development and production process of Blue's Clues inspired several studies that provided evidence for its effectiveness as a learning tool. As Anderson and his colleagues reported, Blue's Clues had "a beneficial cognitive and social impact" the longer younger children watched it, which increased steadily over time, and that its benefits to cognitive development are both durable and cumulative. They also believed that the research conducted on the program demonstrated that when children's television programs were based on information gained from child development concepts, had a systematic curriculum, and were designed with "a research-based understanding of how children use and understand television, it can be a powerful and positive influence". As they stated, "it appears that the program is not only doing well, but it is also doing good". In 2004, Anderson said that Blue's Clues "raised the bar" for educational television; he and Variety reported that audience participation became an important part of other educational preschool TV programs such as Dora the Explorer and Sesame Street. Anderson also reported that after Blue's Clues, all of Nickelodeon's educational programming included the use of formative research.

In 2019, shortly after the premiere of Blue's Clues & You, the New York Times called Blue's Clues "something of a throwback: a leisurely paced, unflashy show with the educational bona fides of its public TV predecessors Mr. Rogers and Sesame Street". It also stated that Blue's Clues paved the way for shows like Dora the Explorer. The program was the first children's cable show built entirely around direct address, the first to invite preschoolers to play along with the characters with games and "mini-mysteries", and the first to include built-in silences designed for child participation. As The New York Times stated, "The show was interactive before interactivity became mundane".

Based on anecdotal evidence that preschoolers enjoyed repeated viewings of the programs they watched on television, including Anderson's own experience with his four-year-old daughter, who asked to watch a tape of the pilot of Blue's Clues 17 times, the producers decided to repeat each episode daily for a week. Despite no published evidence that repeated viewings resulted in increased comprehension, especially for younger viewers, and would reinforce the problem-solving skills taught in each episode, and because they did not have enough money to produce a full season of episodes, Nickelodeon agreed to their broadcast strategy, and they were the first network to experiment with the approach. In the summer of 1996, before the premiere of Blue's Clues, Santomero, Anderson, and Wilder conducted a study, funded by Nickelodeon, about the effect of repeated viewings of the pilot episode on its viewers and their ability to learn the curriculum content contained in the episode.

Anderson reported that the results of the study were "clear, striking, and to us, very interesting". They found that except for the five-year-old boys they tested, audience participation greatly increased with repetition, especially for the problem-solving portions of an episode, as did their comprehension and problem solving. Anderson stated, "As children learned how to solve the problems they would shout out the answers, talk to Steve, point to the screen, jump up with excitement, and so on". After five viewings, children had also become skilled at solving similar problems that had not been presented in the episode. Anderson reported that the repetition broadcast strategy worked during the program's first year. Nickelodeon used the same strategy for its premiere of Dora the Explorer in 2000, and Nielsen ratings for both programs indicated no change in audience size during the time the repetitions aired. The study also demonstrated that watching Blue's Clues changed how children watch television and that their problem-solving skills and interaction would transfer to other programs they watched.

In 1999, Anderson and a team of researchers, some of which were his colleagues at Nickelodeon, studied how episode repetition affected comprehension, audience participation, and visual attention. The researchers tested whether repeated viewings of the show resulted in mastery over the material presented, or whether viewers would habituate to what they watched or become bored. The study demonstrated that for the first few repetitions, children pay close attention to the educational content because it was more cognitively demanding. The researchers concluded that audience participation was lower because children were devoting more of their cognitive resources to understanding and solving the problem presented in the episode. When they mastered the problems, which the researchers suspected happened the third time the children viewed the episode, they paid the same amount of attention to the educational content as to the entertainment content, which was less demanding. Audience participation, however, increased because their cognitive resources were freed up and because they knew the answers to the questions asked by the host and other characters. Anderson and his colleagues believed that their study proved that episode repetition appeared to foster their viewers' empowerment, as demonstrated in the viewers' enthusiastic efforts to help solve problems the host and other characters posed.

The study also demonstrated that experienced viewers (those familiar with the program) looked less at the screen than inexperienced viewers. All children looked at educational content more than at entertainment content. Experienced viewers looked at content unique to the program, but inexperienced viewers did not distinguish between the two types of content, since for them, all content was new. Experienced viewers interacted with the program more and showed better comprehension of the content than inexperienced viewers, especially when they were exposed to content that was repeated across episodes. As Anderson and his colleagues put it, "These results further support the notion that when content is new and challenging, preschoolers pay greater attention, but when it is in a recurrent format and therefore readily mastered, they interact more". In other words, "Interaction in Blue's Clues to some extent thus reflects mastery". Nielsen ratings of the show's first season, when the same episode was shown daily, were flat over the five-day period, which indicated to Anderson that young children did not tire of its repetition or of its complexity over time. According to Crawley and her colleagues, the producers' repeat broadcast strategy had no negative effectives of the program's ratings and appeared to be a success.

In 2000, another team of researchers, including Anderson, Crawley, and other Nickelodeon colleagues, studied if watching Blue's Clues changed the way children watch television and if they learned "an interactive style of television viewing", meaning that they were more interactive with an episode from a different series than viewers who did not have experience watching Blue's Clues. They compared experienced and unexperienced viewers as they watched an episode of Big Bag, a "curriculum-based magazine format" series that aired on Cartoon Network, directed towards approximately the same audience as Blue's Clues. They found that although experienced Blue's Clues viewers paid less overall attention to Big Bag than inexperienced viewers, their patterns of attention across Big Bag were identical to their attention to an episode of Blue's Clues. They also demonstrated that viewers had the same amount of comprehension in both programs, but Blue's Clues viewers interacted more with Big Bag than inexperienced viewers. When the content of Big Bag was new and challenging, Blue's Clues viewers paid more attention, and when it was familiar, either from previous viewings or in a format they recognized, they interacted with it more. In short, Anderson and his colleagues found that "interaction in Blue's Clues to some extent reflects mastery" and felt that their study demonstrated that watching Blue's Clues changed how young children watch television. Researcher Shalom M. Fisch, however, stated that although the show attempted to be "participatory", it could not truly be so, because unlike interactive computer games, the viewers' responses could not change or influence what occurred on-screen.

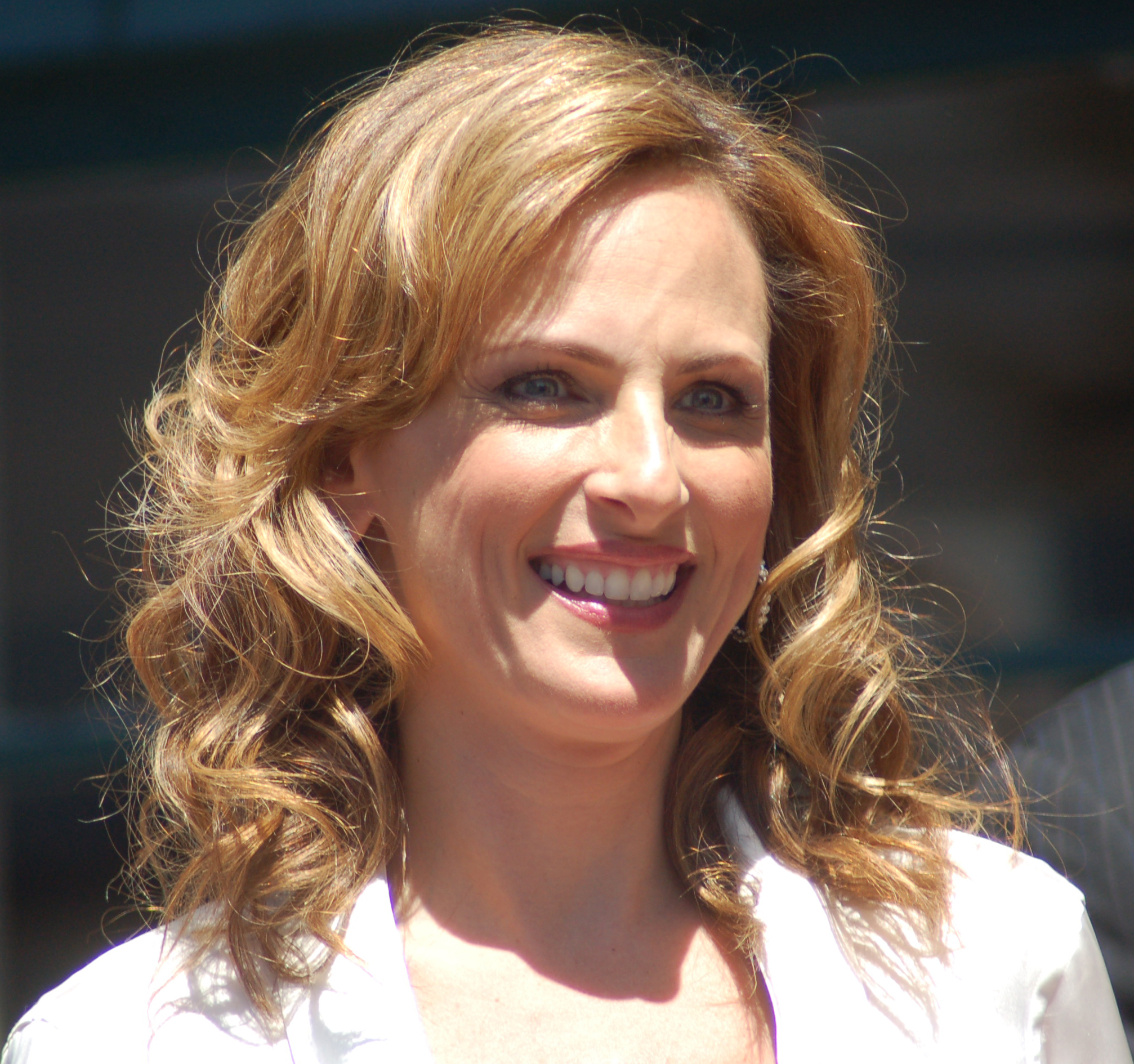
Actress Marlee Matlin (pictured in 2009) appeared in several Blue's Clues episodes introducing American Sign Language to its young viewers.

In 2002, Crawley, Anderson, and their colleagues conducted another study on the effects of Blue's Clues, this time researching whether more experienced viewers mastered the content and cognitive challenges faster and easier than first-time viewers. They surmised that experienced viewers would comprehend and interact more with the recurring and familiar segments of the show designed to aid comprehension, but they found that familiarity with the structure of an individual episode did not provide experienced viewers with an advantage over the inexperienced viewers. Crawley and Anderson also studied whether experienced viewers of Blue's Clues interacted more with other children's TV shows and whether the viewing behaviors they learned from Blue's Clues could be transferred to other shows. They found that although experienced viewers of Blue's Clues interacted with an episode of another series, they did not spend more time watching it than viewers unfamiliar with the show. The researchers stated, "It is apparent that, although preschoolers learn to enthusiastically engage in overt audience participation, they do not, by and large, have a metacognitive understanding of why they do so."

The 2002 studies demonstrated that experience with watching one TV series affects how children watch other programs, especially in the way they interact with them. They also showed that since children are selective in the material they attend to and that their interaction increases with comprehension and mastery, children tend to pay more attention to novel information and interact more with material they have seen before and mastered. According to Crawley and her colleagues, Blue's Clues demonstrated that television could empower and influence children's long-term motivation for and a love of learning. As they stated, "One need only to watch children watch Blue's Clues to realize that they respond to it with enormous enthusiasm".

Erin Ryan and her colleagues performed a 2009 study on the effect of the use of American Sign Language (ASL) in Blue's Clues episodes. They analyzed 16 episodes over two weeks for the content and frequency of the signs used and found a high incidence of ASL use by various characters, but that it was inconsistent, especially in the connection between English words and their corresponding signs. The purpose of signed communication and its connection with ASL and the Deaf community was also not clearly explained. The researchers speculated that hearing children with no previous ASL exposure would become familiar with ASL and with deaf people by these episodes, thus reducing the stigma attached to deafness and hard of hearing individuals. Based on other research about the positive effects of teaching ASL to hearing children, the researchers also speculated that it could lead to an increase of vocabulary skills and IQ, as well as improve interpersonal communication. They surmised that deaf children would feel more included and less isolated and have more opportunities to view positive models of ASL and deaf people.

Georgene L. Troseth and her colleagues at Vanderbilt University studied how toddlers used information gained from prerecorded video and from interactions with a person through closed-circuit video, and found that two-year-old children did not learn as much from prerecorded videos because the videos lacked social cues and personal references. Two-year-olds who viewed a video with instructions about how to find a toy in an adjoining room from a non-interactive researcher did not use the information, even though they smiled and responded to questions. Troseth speculated that their research had implications for interactive educational shows like Blue's Clues, which although was "on the right track" because the host invited interaction with the show's viewers, did not provide children with the social cues to solve real-world problems. Troseth stated that repetition, repeated exposure, and familiarity with the show's host may increase children's ability to learn facts and to use strategies they learn from Blue's Clues to solve new problems. Her research suggested that Blue's Clues engaged young children and elicited their active participation because they mimicked social interaction.

== 2019 revival ==
On March 6, 2018, Nickelodeon announced a revival of the series, with a new host and 20 new episodes. An open casting call for the show's new host occurred in April, and production began in the summer of 2018. On September 13, 2018, it was announced that the show would be titled Blue's Clues & You!, and Josh Dela Cruz would be the host of the revival. The show premiered on November 11, 2019. It was cancelled and ended after five years, with the last episode released on September 27, 2024.
