= Daniel R. Anderson =

American psychologist

Daniel R. Anderson (born 1944) is an American psychologist and a professor emeritus at the University of Massachusetts Amherst. Anderson specializes in developmental psychology and was involved in the creation of children's television series including Allegra's Window, Gullah Gullah Island, Bear in the Big Blue House, Blue's Clues, and Dora the Explorer. He has also acted as an advisor to Captain Kangaroo, The Wubbulous World of Dr. Seuss, Sesame Street, Fimbles, Go, Diego, Go!, It's a Big Big World, Peep and the Big Wide World and The WotWots.

In 2005, Anderson became part of the Sesame Beginnings Advisory Board, which included other "national child development and media experts". The Workshop has also awarded him a grant to study the "impact of baby videos on parent-child interaction".

Anderson received his Ph.D. from Brown University in 1971.

== Publications ==
- Instructional programming for the handicapped student, 1975
- The impact of children's education: Television's influence on cognitive development
- Instructional programs for the severely handicapped student: Field test version
- The impact on children's education : television's influence on cognitive development
- Fmri in Media Psychology Research: A Special Issue of Media Psychology, with John P. Murray, 30 January 2006
- Early Childhood Television Viewing and Adolescent Behavior: The Recontact Study (Monographs of the Society for Research in Child Development), with Aletha C. Huston, Kelly Schmitt, Deborah Linebarger, John C. Wright, March 2001, ISBN 0-631-22922-1

=== Summary of journals, encyclopedias, books, etc. ===
- Advances in applied developmental psychology (1984, with R. Smith)
- Attention and cognitive development (1979, with L. F. Alwitt, E. P. Lorch, S. R. Levin)
- AV Communication Review (1977, with S. R. Levin and E. P. Lorch)
- British Journal of Statistical and Mathematical Psychology (1972, with D. G. Kemler)
- Bulletin of the Psychonomic Society (1973, with B. E. Shepp and D. G. Kemler)
- Child Development (1976, with S. R. Levin; 1979, with E. P. Lorch, S. R. Levin; 1981, with E. P. Lorch, D. E. Field, J. Sanders; 1985, with C. Fischer, R. Smith; 1985, with D. E. Field, P. A. Collins, E. P. Lorch, J. G. Nathan; 1986, with J. Gibbons, R. N. Smith, D. E. Field, C. Fischer; 1986, with E. P. Lorch, P. A. Collins, D. E. Field, J. G. Nathan)
- Children and the formal features of television (1983 with D. E. Field)
- Children's understanding of TV: Research on attention and comprehension (1983, J. Bryant; 1983 with E. P. Lorch; 1983 with J. Bryant; 1987, with H. P. Choi, E. P. Lorch)
- Contemporary Psychology (1978)
- Developmental Psychology (1981, with E. P. Lorch, R. Smith, R. Bradford, S. R. Levin; 1999, with K. L. Schmitt, P.A. Collins)
- Encyclopedia of Communication and Information (2002, “Children’s attention to television”)
- G is for growing: Thirty years of research on Sesame Street (2001, “Sesame Street viewers as adolescents: The recontact study”, with A.C. Huston, J.C. Wright, D. Linebarger, K.L. Schmitt)
- Human Factors (1985, with J. G. Nathan, D. E. Field, P. A. Collins)
- In Contemporary Psychology (1981; 1981)
- Journal of Applied Developmental Psychology (2003)
- Journal of Communication (1976, with S. R. Levin; 2003, with K.L. Schmitt, K.D. Woolf)
- Journal of Educational Psychology (1985, with D. E. Field; 1985, with D. E. Field)
- Journal of Experimental Child Psychology (1972; 1975, with A. D. Well, G. F. Strutt; 1975, with A. D. Well; 1980, with J. M. Dowd, R. K. Clifton, W. H. Eichelman; 1980, with A. D. Well, E. P. Lorch)
- Journal of Experimental Psychology, later Journal of Experimental Psychology: Human Perception and Performance (1975, with M. A. Clement; 1984, with E. P. Lorch, A. D. Well)
- Media Psychology (2002, with K.L. Schmitt)
- Monographs of the Society for Research in Child Development (2001, with A.C. Huston, J.C. Wright, D. Linebarger, K.L. Schmitt)
- Psychological Review (1972, with B. E. Shepp and D. G. Kemler)
- Psychological processes and advertising effects: Theory, research and application (1985)
- Sex Roles (1982, with L. Ross, P. A.Wisocki)

== Notes ==
1. "Introducing Sesame Beginnings". Sesame Workshop. 2005. Archived from the original on 2005-12-25.
