= Todd Kessler =

American film and television writer, producer and director

- Born: New York City, US
- Occupation: Television producer
- Known for: Co-creator of Blue's Clues

Todd Kessler is an American film and television writer, producer and director. Among his credits are showrunner and co-creator of Nickelodeon's preschool series Blue's Clues and director and producer of the feature film Keith (2008).

== Career ==
According to Canadian author Malcolm Gladwell, who wrote about Blue's Clues in his book The Tipping Point, Kessler worked for Sesame Workshop's "Sesame Street", but found traditional children's television too static and not visual enough. In 1993–94, Kessler, who was then a freelance producer for Nickelodeon, was assigned to work with Peter Schreck on his seminal interactive television experiments in the network's Orlando studio, developing concepts which were later incorporated into Blue's Clues. Kessler was the first creator involved with the show. Angela Santomero and Traci Paige Johnson were brought later on to complete the Blue's Clues team. Blue's Clues, according to Variety, was "at the forefront of a revolution in kids TV" and was crucial to the growth of Nickelodeon. The innovative and interactive format it created changed children's programming, including its most important influence Sesame Street, which changed its format in 2002 to be more interactive.

Kessler left Nickelodeon and Blue's Clues in June 2000 after three seasons, but would continue to be credited as an executive producer for the rest of the show's run, as well as for all the show's spin-offs.

In 2008, Kessler acquired the teen romantic drama Keith, a film adapted from a short story written by Ron Carlson. The film, which starred Jesse McCartney and Elisabeth Harnois, was Kessler's directorial debut. Kessler also produced and co-wrote (with David Zabel) the film, which "concerns a 17-year-old who thinks she's got it all figured out until she falls for a guy who has nothing to lose".

Kessler is an outspoken critic of the popular belief that young children have short attention spans. In a column he penned for USA Today in its Oct. 26, 2015 edition, he referred to his own experience launching Blue's Clues and the television industry resistance to the series due to the prevailing belief that its unique long-form narrative structure would not succeed with children. He also argued that children would also be engaged with picture books that featured more prose than current publishing industry standards. He wrote similar sentiments in an op-ed he wrote for Forward Reviews, a literary review magazine.

Kessler authored the children's picture book The Good Dog in 2015 and The Good Dog and the Bad Cat in 2016. The books feature long-form narrative storytelling with complex characters and villains, following the adventures of Tako, a dog, and his owner, Ricky Lee; the second volume introduces Allie, a stray cat. Both books are published by Coralstone Press and illustrated by Jennifer Gray Olson. Howard Lavoy, executive editor at Forward Reviews, wrote The Good Dog series is "long form and engaging for kids and their grownups."

In addition, Kessler directed the romantic/musical film Bazodee, released on August 5, 2016 and starring Machel Montano, Natalie Perera, Staz Nair and Kabir Bedi. The story revolves around the complications created when Anita Panchouri (Perera) tries to sacrifice her own needs for the needs of her family. The movie, filmed on location in Trinidad and Tobago, features soca music and is praised for its authentic cast of Indians and Trinidadians and cultural accuracy, with Film Journal International's David Noh comparing it to Black Orpheus. Billboard has also compared the movie to The Harder They Come and Prince's Purple Rain because of Montano's musical performances, bringing soca to a wider audience.

== Awards and nominations ==
As producer for Blue's Clues, Kessler received a Peabody Award, two Television Critics Association Awards in 1997–1998 and 1998–1999, several Parents' Choice Awards, and a New York Film Festival CINE Golden Eagle in 1996. He has also been nominated for six Emmys.

"Keith" won first place in the teenage sections of five international film festivals: Italy's Giffoni Film Festival (in the 15–19-year-old division); the Toronto International Film Festival for Children and Youth (their Students Choice Award, decided on by high school students); Sweden's BUFF International Film Festival for Youth and Children; Germany's SCHLINGEL International Film Festival; and Quebec's Carrousel international du film de Rimouski.
