= List of The Tom and Jerry Show (2014 TV series) episodes =

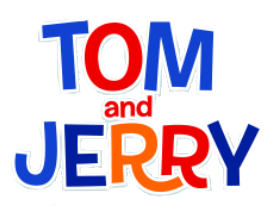

The Tom and Jerry Show is a 2014 American animated television series produced by Warner Bros. Animation and Renegade Animation, based on the Tom and Jerry characters and theatrical cartoon series created by William Hanna and Joseph Barbera in 1940. It first premiered on March 1, 2014, in Canada on Teletoon and later premiered in the United States on Cartoon Network on April 9, 2014. Beginning in 2017, new episodes premiered on Boomerang SVOD.

== Series overview ==
Season	Segments	Episodes	Originally released		
Season	Segments	Episodes	First released	Last released	Network
1	52	26	April 9, 2014	August 4, 2014	Cartoon Network
Special			October 7, 2014		Direct-to-video
2	78	26	February 6, 2016	November 29, 2018	Cartoon Network; Boomerang
3	78	26	February 1, 2019	December 2, 2019	Boomerang
4	78	26	February 1, 2021		Boomerang; Cartoon Network App
5	39	13	February 15, 2021		Boomerang; Cartoon Network App
Films	N/A	2	January 25, 2022	November 15, 2022	Direct-to-video

== Episodes ==
Every episode was directed by Darrell Van Citters.

=== Season 1 (2014) ===
No. overall	No. in season	Title	Written by	Storyboard by	Original release date
1a	1a	"Spike Gets Skooled"	Douglas Segal	Diane Kredensor; Mike Wisniewski	April 9, 2014
Tom gets Spike sent to obedience school for being naughty, and Jerry is left without a protector. When Spike returns, Tom tries hard to get Spike to revert to his old ways. Jerry fights back to make sure that Spike keeps his cool.
1b	1b	"Cat's Ruffled Fur-niture"	Darrel Campbell	Scott O'Brien	April 9, 2014
Tom is under strict orders to not wake the witch sisters, but Jerry is set on getting Tom in trouble. When Tom uses the magic spell wand and makes all of the furniture come alive, he must get the help of Newt to make everything go back as it was.
2a	2a	"Sleep Disorder"	Darrel Campbell	Diane Kredensor; Mike Wisniewski	April 16, 2014
Ginger gets a high-tech mattress and Tom is forbidden from sleeping on it, but when Butch sees it and tries it out, it results in him, Tom, and Jerry fighting over the bed.
2b	2b	"Tom's In-Tents Adventure"	Jim Praytor	Bruce Morris	April 16, 2014
When Tom and Jerry go camping in Yosemite, Jerry appears to be having fun, but Tom isn't. He tries to have as much fun as Jerry has, but ends up attracting a bear.
3a	3a	"Birthday Bashed"	Robert Zappia	Diane Kredensor; Mike Wisniewski	April 23, 2014
Spike forces Tom and Jerry to take over Tyke's birthday party after they ruin it. Note: This episode makes use of Beethoven's Symphony No 5. as Tom plays it on a piano for a few seconds and then it is used as part of the score.
3b	3b	"Feline Fatale"	Michael Daedalus Kenny	Darin McGowan	April 23, 2014
Toodles hires detectives Tom and Jerry to investigate and protect her against a threat to her tuna can inheritance. They go investigate, and a mysterious and menacing figure keeps trying to hurt them.
4a	4a	"Cat Nippy"	Douglas Segal	Robert Souza	April 30, 2014
Tom and Jerry are locked out in the snow.
4b	4b	"Ghost of a Chance"	Robert Zappia	Rich Arons	April 30, 2014
With eight of his nine lives gone, Tom uses magic in order to bring them back.
5a	5a	"Holed-Up"	Jim Praytor	Walt Holcombe	May 14, 2014
When Jerry ventures out of his hole for a late night snack, Tom has a trap set for him. Unfortunately for Tom, he falls into his own trap and gets his head stuck through the wall and into Jerry's house. Jerry tries everything he can to dislodge Tom, and almost gives up hope of ever getting his privacy back.
5b	5b	"One of a Kind"	Adam Buchalter	Scott O'Brien	May 14, 2014
Detectives Tom and Jerry are hired by Polly to get back her collar from mean Barkley at the park. After a series of incidents involving the pound "jail" and an electric fence, Barkley reforms when he meets Polly and falls in love with her.
6a	6a	"Belly Achin'"	Jim Praytor	Alec Megibben	May 21, 2014
Little Quacker enlists Jerry's help in getting his cracked favorite birdbath fixed, but they get distracted by the smell of Tom's delicious Chinese takeout. After fighting over the food, Tom steals Little Quacker's fortune cookie and gets the kind of fortune he deserves.
6b	6b	"Dog Daze"	Jim Praytor	Phil Hernandez	May 21, 2014
Spike's bright idea is to build a swimming pool for Tyke, but he finds that he cannot do it on his own, so he enlists the help of Tom and Jerry, both of whom were just kicked out of the house for being too destructive. As expected, the cat and mouse duo fail to do things the right way, complicated further by Spike trying to refrain from losing his temper in front of his son.
7a	7a	"Birds of a Feather"	Irving Belateche	Darin McGowan	July 7, 2014
Both Tom and Butch compete against to go after Ginger's mom's bird when her and Rick watch it for the weekend. Jerry also makes sure nothing happens to the bird.
7b	7b	"Vampire Mouse"	Irving Belateche	Darin McGowan	July 7, 2014
Jerry tricks Tom by pretending he has turned into a vampire mouse.
8a	8a	"Entering and Breaking"	Jim Praytor	Alec Megibben	July 8, 2014
When a burglar has been breaking in homes, Rick and Ginger leave Spike in charge, and Spike teaches Tom and Jerry how to protect their home and defend themselves.
8b	8b	"Franken Kitty"	Story by : Lissa Kapstrom; Teleplay by : Ellen Byron & Lissa Kapstrom	Alec Megibben	July 8, 2014
Jerry and his friend, Napoleon are lab mice and Tom is outside going through trash until he sees the two mice that he wants for an appetite and things go crazy when Dr. Bigby's elderly cat becomes a vicious kitten and chases the mice.
9a	9a	"Tom Foolery"	Robert Zappia	Jason Lethcoe	July 9, 2014
Butch tricks Tom into switching lifestyles while Jerry tries to endure Butch's attempts to eat him.
9b	9b	"Haunted Mouse"	Robert Zappia	Tim Hodge	July 9, 2014
Tuffy hires detectives Tom and Jerry to get rid of a ghost from a haunted house.
10a	10a	"Here's Lookin' A-Choo, Kid"	Irving Belateche	Fred Cline	July 10, 2014
Spike develops allergies and Rick thinks that Spike is likely allergic to Tom, so Rick gets a hypoallergenic kitten named Glory for Ginger; Spike, Tom, and Jerry plan to get rid of the nice kitten who is actually anything but and will do whatever it takes to be an only pet.
10b	10b	"Superfied"	Charles Carney	Richard Bazley	July 10, 2014
Dr. Bigby creates cookies that give super strength and Jerry and Napoleon eat them and they have fun terrorizing Tom. He eventually gets revenge on them, however.
11a	11a	"What a Pain!"	Adam Beechen	Otis Brayboy	July 11, 2014
Rick takes Tom and Spike to the vet for their checkup while Ginger hires an exterminator to get rid of Jerry and Tuffy.
11b	11b	"Hop to It"	Adam Rudman	Jason Lethcoe	July 11, 2014
Tom and Jerry are sent out to go retrieve an ingredient for the witch sisters by sundown before they are turned into frogs, but Tom develops a crush on Princess Toodles. Butch does too, so they compete against each other in games to win her love while Jerry tries desperately to retrieve the ingredient himself.
12a	12a	"For the Love of Ruggles"	John Edwards	Fred Cline	July 14, 2014
Tom throws Spike's beloved chew toy over the fence and has to get it back when he sees how heartbroken Spike becomes.
12b	12b	"Sleuth or Consequences"	John Edwards	Alec Megibben	July 14, 2014
Detectives Tom and Jerry discovered that Butch and a squirrel are stealing their business and later discovered that they are con artists and stealing from customers.
13a	13a	"Dinner is Swerved"	Irving Belateche	Richard Bazley	July 15, 2014
When Rick and Ginger leave the house for a trip, Tom and Jerry plan to serve a double date with their girlfriends, but things get competitive with them.
13b	13b	"Bottled-Up Emotions"	Robert Zappia	Otis Brayboy	July 15, 2014
Jerry gets affected by one of Dr. Bigby's experiments that expresses love feelings, and Tom tries to take advantage of Jerry's lovable behavior.
14a	14a	"Turn About"	Denise Downer	Tim Hodge	July 16, 2014
Tom has a date with Toodles and she warns him not to be late, but Butch tricks Tom that Toodles has a surprise in the basement for him and he leaves him down there; Toodles leaves Butch in charge of her younger, rowdy siblings; Jerry and Tuffy watches a horror movie and mistakes Tom for a monster.
14b	14b	"The Plight Before Christmas"	Charles Carney	Darin McGowan	July 16, 2014
While celebrating the holidays with Beatie and Hildie, Tom and Jerry accidentally destroyed their Christmas tree and must go out to obtain a new one. In the process, they help out Santa Claus by delivering presents for Christmas.
15a	15a	"Tuffy Love"	Jim Praytor	Jason Lethcoe	July 17, 2014
When Jerry and Tuffy are planning to go on a vacation, Jerry gets mailed away when Tuffy forgets to bring a camera along with him, so Tuffy stays home and outwits Tom, while Jerry attempts to come back home.
15b	15b	"Poof!"	Denise Downer	Tod Carter	July 17, 2014
Detectives Tom and Jerry are hired by a magician rabbit to find his pigeon partner, who has disappeared from his magic act.
16a	16a	"Top Cat"	Adam Rudman	Chris Bailey	July 21, 2014
Tom and Butch compete for the Golden Fez in the United Mouse Catchers when they both attempt to capture Jerry.
16b	16b	"Mummy Dearest"	Charles Carney	Diane Kredensor; Mike Wisniewski	July 21, 2014
The witch sisters both commemorate the passing of their mother, and Tom tries to help out by bringing her back from the grave.
17a	17a	"Domestic Kingdom"	Mark Jeffery Miller	Tim Hodge	July 22, 2014
Tom stars in a documentary that mis-characterizes his daily activities from chasing Jerry to "romancing" Toodles and messing with Spike.
17b	17b	"Molecular Break-Up"	Irving Belateche	Diane Kredensor; Mike Wisniewski	July 22, 2014
Dr. Bigby invents a transporting machine that transports Tom and Jerry to Paris where they meet a girl cat and mouse.
18a	18a	"Just Plane Nuts"	Douglas Segal	David Schwartz	July 23, 2014
Ginger and Rick decide to bring Tom and Spike along on their Hawaiian vacation, but on their plane flight, Jerry and Tuffy tag along as well. Tom and Spike get loose out of their cages, and before long, things go awry.
18b	18b	"Pets Not Welcome"	Douglas Segal	Alec Megibben	July 23, 2014
After the plane incident, Rick and Ginger sneaks Tom and Spike at a "Paradise Resort" where pets are not allowed, but when Rick and Ginger leave Tom and Spike in their room, Jerry and Tuffy cause trouble with them.
19a	19a	"Cruisin' for a Bruisin'"	Douglas Segal	Darin McGowan	July 24, 2014
Rick and Ginger's vacation continues on a cruise ship, where to make sure Tom and Spike don't cause havoc, they keep them in the carriers. Jerry and Tuffy invade their vacation again, and Meathead (the ship's cat) hunts down the mice on the ship.
19b	19b	"Road Trippin'"	Robert Zappia	Alec Megibben	July 24, 2014
Rick and Ginger go on a road trip to visit Ginger's great aunt Claire, but on the trip, Spike and Tom get lost, and Spike deals with "The Doggie of Doom" who follows them.
20a	20a	"Magic Mirror"	Robert Zappia	Tim Hodge	July 25, 2014
When Hildie gets a magic mirror that predicts the future, Tom sees predictions of himself being fed a fish, which is good, and then a bad prediction: switching heads with Beatie.
20b	20b	"Bone Dry"	Jim Praytor; Robert Zappia	Llyn Hunter	July 25, 2014
Detectives Tom and Jerry are hired by Spike to find his missing bones.
21a	21a	"My Bot-y Guard"	Charles Carney	John Sanford	July 28, 2014
Dr. Bigby upgrades his robot to be "The future of home security", but when Tom invades the lab to pursue Jerry and Napoleon, the robot has some tricks up its sleeves which will lead the robot into hysteria.
21b	21b	"Little Quacker and Mister Fuzzy Hide"	John Edwards	Will Finn	July 28, 2014
When Hildie and Beatie leaves their home, Tom and Jerry comes across Little Quacker, who turned into a big monster on and off, then he eats the stew that Tom made standing on the window.
22a	22a	"Pipeline"	Robert Zappia	John Sanford	July 29, 2014
When Ginger's wedding ring falls down the drain, Tom, Jerry, and Spike have to get it back before she finds out.
22b	22b	"No Brain, No Gain"	John Edwards	Tim Hodge	July 29, 2014
One of Dr. Bigby's inventions made Tom intelligent.
23a	23a	"Cat Napped"	Robert Zappia	Alec Megibben	July 30, 2014
When an injured Tom sees a female cat named Misty across the street get catnapped, he and Jerry seeks help from her dog friend, Scarf, to locate her.
23b	23b	"Black Cat"	Robert Zappia	Will Finn	July 30, 2014
When Tom ruins Hildie and Beatie's potions, they get fed up with him, and he overhears them wanting a black cat instead of him. He makes and drinks a potion that turns him into a black cat, and they assume he's another cat named Smokie.
24a	24a	"Hunger Strikes"	Douglas Segal	Chris Bailey	July 31, 2014
During a winter day when Rick and Ginger are out of the house, Tom, Jerry, Tuffy, Spike, and Tyke manage to get and find food around the house.
24b	24b	"Gravi-Tom"	Rob Hummel	Scott O'Brien	July 31, 2014
One of Dr. Bigby's inventions makes things float, so Jerry and Napoleon try it on themselves and then they try it out on Tom.
25a	25a	"Ghost Party"	Robert Zappia	Tim Hodge	August 1, 2014
When Hildie and Beatie go away on a vacation, Tom and Jerry has problems when their ghost nephew, Grayson, comes over and throws a large party with his friends and takes their crystal ball for bowling.
25b	25b	"Cat-Astrophe"	Robert Zappia	Diane Kredensor; Mike Wisniewski	August 1, 2014
An asteroid is heading towards Earth, and Tom and Jerry are determined to stop it; Napoleon is hungry for the vending machine food, so he tries to get the "Best Candy Bar Ever!" out of that machine by using a $1 bill from Jerry.
26a	26a	"Curse Case Scenario"	John Edwards	Alec Megibben	August 4, 2014
An unlucky dog named Dutch goes to detectives Tom and Jerry, saying that a ruby stone he has been guarding from his great grandfather's master pirate "Captain Wrongway Weston", is taken from a female dog named Roxy, who is also unlucky.
26b	26b	"Say Cheese"	Michael Daedalus Kenny; Jim Praytor	Tod Carter	August 4, 2014
When he tries out a new cheese-in-a-can that Rick and Ginger buy, Tom has a crazy day when he experiences hallucinations based on the show's other scenarios and looks like a mouse.

=== Special (2014) ===
Title	Written by	Storyboard by	Original release date
Santa's Little Helpers	Jim Praytor; Robert Zappia	Will Finn; Mike Kunkel; Darin McGowan; Alec Megibben; Scott O'Brien	October 7, 2014
Jerry and Tuffy are living the good life in Santa's workshop up until the unfortunate day on which Tom is rescued by the Claus family. With Tom in the house, merry mayhem ensues at the North Pole, but when the dust settles, the destructive trio now has to work together to save a little dog named Jingles and learn the true meaning of giving and friendship.

=== Season 2 (2016–18) ===
On February 6, 2016, the second season premiered on Cartoon Network. However, new episodes premiered internationally first starting with "Say Uncle". To match closer to the original shorts, the running time for the segments was reduced from 11 to 7 minutes each, the number of segments per half-hour show was increased from 2 to 3, and the art style was changed.

No. overall	No. in season	Title	Story by	Storyboard by	Original release date
27a	1a	"Dental Case"	Jim Praytor; Robert Zappia	Tod Carter	February 6, 2016
Spike needs Tom and Jerry's help to pull his tooth so he can avoid the vet.
27b	1b	"Picture Imperfect"	Jim Praytor; Robert Zappia	Tod Carter	February 6, 2016
Jerry and Tuffy are getting ready for Picture Day while Tom and Spike are getting clean for it.
27c	1c	"One-Way Cricket"	Jim Praytor; Robert Zappia	Diane Kredensor	February 6, 2016
After Tom accidentally lets a cricket into the house, he must get rid of it in order to avoid sleeping outside with Spike.
28a	2a	"Slinging in the Rain"	Jim Praytor; Robert Zappia	Will Finn	February 13, 2016
Tom is left outside when a rainstorm approaches. When he gets indoors and the rain is gone, Jerry and Tuffy tormenting him, and Spike & Tyke uses the water on them.
28b	2b	"Squeaky Clean"	Jim Praytor; Robert Zappia	Will Finn	February 13, 2016
Rick mail-orders a cat-hair zapping robot which causes problems around Tom and Jerry.
28c	2c	"Tough Luck Duck"	Jim Praytor; Robert Zappia	Tod Carter	February 13, 2016
Little Quacker thinks he's being bad luck around Tom, Jerry, and Spike after walking under a ladder.
29a	3a	"The Paper Airplane Chase"	Jim Praytor; Robert Zappia	Will Finn	February 20, 2016
When Tom is left in charge to watch Ginger's cake batter when she goes out to the store, Jerry and Tuffy use paper airplanes to get to the cake batter.
29b	3b	"Round Tripped"	Jim Praytor; Robert Zappia	Tod Carter	February 27, 2016
Tom is excited to go away with Rick and Ginger for a weekend getaway to an island paradise, but when he keeps getting hurt pursuing Jerry, Rick and Ginger considers keeping Tom at the pet oasis if he keeps getting hurt.
29c	3c	"Smitten with the Kitten"	Jim Praytor; Robert Zappia	Diane Kredensor	March 5, 2016
A cute kitten named Button stays over at the house until she has a new home. Everybody loves Button, except for Tom.
30a	4a	"Cheesy Ball Run"	Jim Praytor; Robert Zappia	Tod Carter	March 12, 2016
Tom, Jerry, and Butch watch a Smack-n-Cheese Cheesy Cheese Puffs commercial and when they hear "Supplies are seriously running out!", their rivalry reaches new heights as they compete to get what they imagine to be the very last bag of Smack-n-Cheese Cheesy Cheese Puffs.
30b	4b	"Say Uncle"	Jim Praytor; Robert Zappia	Alec Megibben	September 21, 2017
Jerry and his little brother Tuffy's uncle, Harry, is coming for a visit. Tuffy's excited to meet him he has heard so much about. Harry craves a respite from his life as a nomad on the party cruise ship circuit, but it doesn't take him long to realize that life on the high seas has its advantages (specifically not being holed-up with Tom).
30c	4c	"Here Comes the Bribe"	Jim Praytor; Robert Zappia	Will Finn	September 21, 2017
When Toodles tells her parents that she is married with kids, she asks Tom to be her husband.
31a	5a	"Slap Happy Birthday"	Jim Praytor; Robert Zappia	Diane Kredensor	December 21, 2017
Tom and Jerry try to give Spike a birthday to remember.
31b	5b	"Tuffy's Big Adventure"	Jim Praytor; Robert Zappia	Tod Carter	December 21, 2017
Tuffy and Tyke head out on a big adventure.
31c	5c	"Dragon Down the Holidays"	Jim Praytor; Robert Zappia	Tod Carter	December 21, 2017
Tom and Jerry befriends a baby dragon.
32a	6a	"Big Top Tom"	Jim Praytor; Robert Zappia	Diane Kredensor	December 21, 2017
Jerry enjoys the perks of circus life. Meanwhile, Tom, who thinks Jerry has been swallowed by a bear, tries to rescue him.
32b	6b	"Reward If Lost"	Jim Praytor; Robert Zappia	James Suhr	December 21, 2017
Jerry spreads signs saying to return Tom to a house that is not his, but a very stout black dog.
32c	6c	"Build-A-Beast"	Jim Praytor; Robert Zappia	Diane Kredensor	December 21, 2017
Tom and Jerry faces a cottage beast named Bog.
33a	7a	"To Kill a Mockingbird"	Jim Praytor; Robert Zappia	Alec Megibben	December 21, 2017
Tom, Jerry, and Spike go to war with a mockingbird.
33b	7b	"From Nuts to Soup"	Jim Praytor; Robert Zappia	Tod Carter	December 21, 2017
Tom and Jerry face a flying squirrel.
33c	7c	"No Fly Zone"	Jim Praytor; Robert Zappia	Tod Carter	December 21, 2017
Jerry battles a pesky fly over a cheese wedge.
34a	8a	"X Marks the Thumpin'"	Jim Praytor; Robert Zappia	Tod Carter	December 21, 2017
Tom and Jerry get a hold of a treasure map.
34b	8b	"Charity Case"	Jim Praytor; Robert Zappia	Alec Megibben	December 21, 2017
Jerry donates Tom's blanket to 'Badwill'.
34c	8c	"Duck, Duck, Loose"	Jim Praytor; Robert Zappia	Diane Kredensor	December 21, 2017
Jerry discovers that Little Quacker is a sleepwalker.
35a	9a	"Dandy Do-Gooders"	Jim Praytor; Robert Zappia	Tod Carter	December 21, 2017
Tom and Jerry have their own little scouting competition.
35b	9b	"Shadow Boxin'"	Jim Praytor; Robert Zappia	Alec Megibben	December 21, 2017
Tom gets separated from his shadow.
35c	9c	"Baby Blues"	Jim Praytor; Robert Zappia	Diane Kredensor	December 21, 2017
Spike is tasked with taking care of a baby.
36a	10a	"Life's a Beach"	Jim Praytor; Robert Zappia	Will Finn	February 8, 2018
Tom and Jerry must work together to survive on a beach day.
36b	10b	"Meanie Genie"	Earl Richey Jones; Todd R. Jones	Will Finn	February 8, 2018
Jerry is granted three wishes by a genie.
36c	10c	"Flea Bitten"	Jim Praytor; Robert Zappia	Will Finn	December 21, 2017
Butch accidentally brings an infestation of fleas into the house.
37a	11a	"I Quit"	Jim Praytor; Robert Zappia	Will Finn	February 8, 2018
Jerry gives up living with Tom and decides to live in the house of a friendlier cat.
37b	11b	"Art of the Deal"	Jim Praytor; Robert Zappia	Will Finn	August 2, 2018
Spike uses detectives Tom and Jerry to win several card game dog matches.
37c	11c	"Hiccup and Away"	Jim Praytor; Robert Zappia or Frank Kelly	James Suhr	August 2, 2018
Tom has hiccups and the witches force him into the dark forest to scare himself and free himself from hiccupping. But what he did not know was that the witches asked for Jerry's help to follow him and use their magic wand to create several scares for Tom along the way.
38a	12a	"Tom-Fu"	Jim Praytor; Robert Zappia	James Suhr	February 8, 2018
Tom hurts his head when he takes a hit from the television, making him look like a karate master and assaulting Spike, Jerry, and Tuffy all over the house.
38b	12b	"You Can't Handle the Tooth"	Jason Plapp	Alec Megibben	February 8, 2018
Tom and Jerry use a magic tooth that ends up making them destroy the house of the witches.
38c	12c	"Pain for Sale"	Jim Praytor; Robert Zappia	Diane Kredensor; Mike Wisniewski	February 8, 2018
Tom and Jerry help Spike retrieve Tyke's first lost leash.
39a	13a	"Downton Tabby"	Jim Praytor; Robert Zappia	Tod Carter	August 2, 2018
Tom and Jerry create much confusion in a fancy restaurant.
39b	13b	"Growing Pains"	Jason Plapp	Diane Kredensor; Mike Wisniewski	February 8, 2018
Tom tries to prove that he can make a better garden than Jerry's.
39c	13c	"Toodle Boom"	Jim Praytor; Robert Zappia	Tod Carter	February 8, 2018
Toodles gets excited when she tries to chase Jerry and Tuffy around the house and Tom tries to distract her at any cost.
40a	14a	"Bringing Down the House"	Jim Praytor; Robert Zappia	Diane Kredensor; Mike Wisniewski	February 8, 2018
Tom, Jerry, and Spike try to drive out a sour nanny from their house.
40b	14b	"Return to Sender"	Jim Praytor; Robert Zappia	Alec Megibben	February 8, 2018
Tom and Jerry try to discover Beatie's secret admirer.
40c	14c	"Jerry Rigged"	Tim Casto	Tod Carter	August 2, 2018
A red cat helps Tom invent plans so he can capture Jerry.
41a	15a	"The Art of War"	Jim Praytor; Robert Zappia	James Suhr	December 21, 2017
Tom tries to protect Rick's birthday frame for Ginger, while Jerry only makes things difficult for him.
41b	15b	"Pillow Case"	Jim Praytor; Robert Zappia	Will Finn	August 2, 2018
Detectives Tom and Jerry help a little dog named Stardust, find her missing cushion.
41c	15c	"Home Insecurity"	Tim Casto	Tod Carter	February 8, 2018
Rick installs a home automation system in the house controls. But, Tom and Jerry end up overusing the technology of the main system commands, which causes several disasters around the house.
42a	16a	"Tail of Two Kitties"	Earl Richey Jones; Todd R. Jones	Diane Kredensor; Mike Wisniewski	August 2, 2018
Butch pretends his tail is broken, just to settle in Tom and Jerry's house.
42b	16b	"Vanishing Creamed"	Jim Praytor; Robert Zappia	Diane Kredensor; Mike Wisniewski	August 2, 2018
Tom and Jerry use too much disappearance potion causing major accidental problems.
42c	16c	"Unhappily Harried After"	Jim Praytor; Robert Zappia	Tod Carter	August 2, 2018
Tom asks for Toodles' hand in marriage. After this, Toodles orders that Tom and Jerry do all the heavy work to take care of her small sons.
43a	17a	"Splinter of Discontent"	Jim Praytor; Robert Zappia	Alec Megibben; Mike Milo	August 2, 2018
Tom tries to pull a thorn out of Tyke's leg without Spike finding out, but for that, he must rely on Jerry and Tuffy.
43b	17b	"Forget Me Not"	Earl Richey Jones; Todd R. Jones	Will Finn	November 29, 2018
Tom tries to remember all the events that occurred while he solved a case in his detective work.
43c	17c	"In the Beginning"	Jim Praytor; Robert Zappia	Tod Carter	August 2, 2018
One back in time showing how Tom and Jerry met.
44a	18a	"Uncle Pecos Rides Again"	Jim Praytor; Robert Zappia	Will Finn	August 2, 2018
Pecos pays a visit to Jerry's house and uses Tom as his rodeo horse. Note: Tom has a flashback from the classic short Pecos Pest when Pecos visits Jerry and Pecos keeps plucking Tom's whiskers from his face.
44b	18b	"Out with the Old"	Jim Praytor; Robert Zappia	Alec Megibben	August 2, 2018
When Jerry overhears Rick and Ginger wanting to get rid of a "useless cat", he tries to keep Tom working as fully as possible.
44c	18c	"Tic-Tyke-Do'h"	Jim Praytor; Robert Zappia	Diane Kredensor; Mike Wisniewski	November 29, 2018
Tom and Jerry try to help Tyke get along in games and games.
45a	19a	"Tom and Jerry-Geddon"	Jim Praytor; Robert Zappia	Tod Carter	November 29, 2018
Tom and Jerry make a battlefield indoors.
45b	19b	"No Strings Attached"	Jim Praytor; Robert Zappia	Diane Kredensor; Mike Wisniewski	November 29, 2018
Tom uses the witch's magic wand to give life to a puppet who ends up comparing Jerry to a baby.
45c	19c	"Move It or Lose It"	Jim Praytor; Robert Zappia	Tod Carter	November 29, 2018
Spike gets fat by eating too much grilled meat, so Tom and Jerry try to hide all of it so he can't eat any more.
46a	20a	"Wing Nuts"	Jim Praytor; Robert Zappia	Will Finn	November 29, 2018
Little Quacker asks the help of the detectives Tom and Jerry to help him find his girlfriend, Fifi, who waits for him to take him on a trip to the south.
46b	20b	"Cat Dance Fever"	Jim Praytor; Robert Zappia	Will Finn	November 29, 2018
Detectives Tom and Jerry must help ballerina Toodles win a dance contest.
46c	20c	"Hunger Games"	Jim Praytor; Robert Zappia	Diane Kredensor; Mike Wisniewski	November 29, 2018
Tom tries to eat Little Quacker, and Jerry does everything to ensure his protection.
47a	21a	"Hair Today, Gone Tomorrow"	Jim Praytor; Robert Zappia	Diane Kredensor; Mike Wisniewski	November 29, 2018
Tom is losing a lot of his hair and asks Jerry and Spike for help to get his hair fur back.
47b	21b	"Missing in Traction"	Jim Praytor; Robert Zappia	Will Finn	November 29, 2018
Detectives Tom and Jerry investigate the case of a mysterious maniacal dog that is astounding every cat in town.
47c	21c	"Funnel Face"	Jim Praytor; Robert Zappia	Diane Kredensor; Mike Wisniewski	November 29, 2018
Tom becomes a joke when he's forced to use a cone for a week.
48a	22a	"Dirty Rat"	Jim Praytor; Robert Zappia	Will Finn	November 29, 2018
Frankie takes advantage of Tom and Jerry's stewardship to get food.
48b	22b	"Cat-titude Adjustment"	Jim Praytor; Robert Zappia	Tod Carter	November 29, 2018
The witches cast a spell on Tom's attitude so he could get a better understanding of Jerry.
48c	22c	"Pinch Hitter"	Jim Praytor; Robert Zappia	Will Finn	November 29, 2018
Tom enters a feline institute and tries to stop his traps from catching Meathead inside his house.
49a	23a	"Fight in the Museum"	Tim Casto	Tod Carter	November 29, 2018
Tom and Jerry fight in a museum of national antiques.
49b	23b	"Kitten Grifters"	Rob Hummel	Will Finn	November 29, 2018
Sleep-deprived detectives, Tom and Jerry, try to stop a thief kitten who has been stealing all things from the hotel's residents.
49c	23c	"School of Hard Knocks"	Jim Praytor; Robert Zappia	Tod Carter	November 29, 2018
Winston runs a small school, and Tom and Jerry help him with the most difficult tasks.
50a	24a	"Cat-a-Tonic Mouse"	Will Finn	Will Finn	November 29, 2018
Tom, Jerry, and Spike get sick and Uncle Pecos comes to rest them.
50b	24b	"Brain Food"	Jim Praytor; Robert Zappia	Will Finn	November 29, 2018
Detectives Tom and Jerry help a paranoid dog investigate aliens from another planet who show up at the home of their cat friends.
50c	24c	"Wish Bone"	Jim Praytor; Robert Zappia	Diane Kredensor; Mike Wisniewski	November 29, 2018
When Butch offers his wish bone to Tom, he's willing to make his requests a reality.
51a	25a	"Going, Going, Gone Viral"	Jim Praytor; Robert Zappia	Diane Kredensor; Mike Wisniewski	November 29, 2018
Tom is ridiculed by everyone when his hilarious video is posted on the internet.
51b	25b	"The Tortoise Don't Play Fair"	Ryan Roope	Will Finn	November 29, 2018
Detectives Tom and Jerry try to stop Tradewell Tortoise who will participate in a race with his rival, Hector Hare.
51c	25c	"Fish Out of Water"	Jim Praytor; Robert Zappia	Tod Carter	November 29, 2018
Tom and Jerry face the witches' pet piranha.
52a	26a	"Cat Match Fever"	Jim Praytor; Robert Zappia	Steve Moore	November 29, 2018
Jerry and Tuffy help Winston prepare the perfect match for Toodles, but Tom and Butch are not at all pleased with this affair.
52b	26b	"Cold Snap"	Jim Praytor; Robert Zappia	Tod Carter	November 29, 2018
Tom and Jerry use the magic of the witches to get rid of the heat.
52c	26c	"Novel Idea"	Jim Praytor; Robert Zappia	Will Finn	November 29, 2018
Detectives Tom and Jerry look for customers who need their help. In the end, it all goes well with a big surprise party, especially for the detectives.

=== Season 3 (2019) ===
On May 23, 2018, Boomerang announced the third season of The Tom and Jerry Show was slated to be released on February 1, 2019.

No. overall	No. in season	Title	Story by	Storyboard by	Original release date
53a	1a	"Someone's in the Kitchen with Mynah"	Will Finn	Dave Farber	February 1, 2019
Ginger gets a Mynah bird that causes trouble when he imitates everyone in the household.
53b	1b	"When You Leash Expect It"	Julie McNally Cahill; Tim Cahill	Tod Carter	February 1, 2019
Spike and an apathetic Tom are taken for a walk by their owners, as Jerry and Tuffy have the house to themselves.
53c	1c	"Don't Cut the Cheese"	Julie McNally Cahill; Tim Cahill	Sean Bishop	February 1, 2019
Tom is tasked with keeping the Montezuma's Lament Stilton Cheese safe from harm, including Jerry.
54a	2a	"Calamari Jerry"	Will Finn	Mark Pudleiner	February 1, 2019
Jerry bonds with a baby octopus.
54b	2b	"Cattyshack"	Julie McNally Cahill; Tim Cahill	Mark Pudleiner	February 1, 2019
Tom must set the golf course up so the lady of the house could play Croquet, but he and Jerry end up destroying the golf course in the process.
54c	2c	"Drone Sweet Drone"	Julie McNally Cahill; Tim Cahill	Tod Carter	February 1, 2019
Rick gets a new delivery drone and Tom and Jerry end up going on a joyride on it.
55a	3a	"Home Away from Home"	Julie McNally Cahill; Tim Cahill	Tod Carter	February 1, 2019
Tom finds himself in another neighborhood, after sleeping inside a rolled-up carpet.
55b	3b	"From Riches to Rags"	Tim Casto	Sean Bishop	February 1, 2019
Jerry has a dream that Tom is his servant and orders him to do whatever he wants.
55c	3c	"Chew Toy"	Charlie Richards	Dave Farber	February 1, 2019
Tom ends up in a box for a garage sale and is taken to a house where he becomes a dog's new chew toy.
56a	4a	"Live and Let Diet"	Julie McNally Cahill; Tim Cahill	Tod Carter	February 1, 2019
Tom is tasked with making Alfred, the house dog fit and ready for a dog show, but Jerry won't make it easy!
56b	4b	"Auntie Social"	Will Finn	Tod Carter	February 1, 2019
Tom spends a few days at Rick's aunt's house.
56c	4c	"A Snootful"	Julie McNally Cahill; Tim Cahill	Steve Moore	February 1, 2019
Tom is tasked with keeping Jerry from bothering a snooty cat, belonging to the Duchess' friend, but the fancy cat has her intentions on capturing Jerry.
57a	5a	"Lame Duck"	Julie McNally Cahill; Tim Cahill	Sam Niemann	February 1, 2019
When Rick and Ginger install a new birdbath, Little Quacker uses it and is adored by Ginger. Tom and Spike plot to get rid of him.
57b	5b	"It's All Relative"	Tim Casto	Steve Moore	February 1, 2019
Jerry's annoying British cousins pay him a visit, and Tom and Jerry plan to get rid of them.
57c	5c	"Vegged Out"	Charlie Richards	Sam Niemann	February 1, 2019
Jerry uses Tom's fear of cucumbers to his advantage.
58a	6a	"Faux Hunt"	Will Finn	Dave Farber	February 1, 2019
Tom gets confused for a fox by a local-fox-hunting party.
58b	6b	"Frown and Country"	Will Finn	Tod Carter	February 1, 2019
Jerry is suffering the springtime blues, but at Muscles' suggestion, Jerry just might find romance.
58c	6c	"Lost Marbles"	Denise Downer	Tod Carter	February 1, 2019
Detectives Tom and Jerry helps Meathead find his marbles for a tournament.
59a	7a	"Vocal Yokel"	Will Finn	Tod Carter	February 1, 2019
Little Quacker gets a new talent: singing opera and when he sings in Jerry's mouse hole, Rick and Ginger assumes Jerry is the one singing.
59b	7b	"Hamster Hoopla"	Julie McNally Cahill; Tim Cahill	Robert Sledge	February 1, 2019
When Ginger takes in a hamster left on the doorstep, it escapes and Tom has Jerry posing as the hamster, but soon they discover more hamsters are in the cage multiplying.
59c	7c	"Tuff Shooting"	Greg Perkins	Tom Mazzocco	February 1, 2019
On a day of clay pigeon shooting outside the manor, Tom tries to remove Tuffy and Jerry.
60a	8a	"Anger Mismanagement"	Greg Perkins	Mark Pudleiner	February 1, 2019
Jerry's cousin, Muscles, visits and teaches Tom and Spike anger management from a book he wrote.
60b	8b	"Vampire State"	Will Finn	Dave Farber	September 26, 2019
Tom becomes a vampire.
60c	8c	"It Ain't Over Until the Cat Lady Sings"	Tim Casto; Jeremy Mann	Tod Carter	February 1, 2019
Detectives Tom and Jerry are in a mystery case about the disappearance of musical diva Kitty Caterwaul.
61a	9a	"Eggstra Credit"	Charlie Richards	Len Simon	March 29, 2019
Tom and Jerry attempt to get eggs from chickens next door.
61b	9b	"Costume Party Smarty"	Will Finn	Christina Mijares	September 26, 2019
When Rick and Ginger throw a Halloween costume party, Tom, Jerry, Spike, and Tuffy want the food.
61c	9c	"Battle of the Butlers"	Stephanie Aurelio	Dan Root	March 29, 2019
Tom reads and learns from a book written by Jerry to be in the "Battle of the Butlers" competition.
62a	10a	"Kid Stuff"	Will Finn	Sean Bishop	March 29, 2019
Tom is tasked with clearing the tall grass off the mansion grounds, but when a gluttonous baby goat finds his way into the grounds, he gets help from him.
62b	10b	"Stolen Heart"	Denise Downer	Tod Carter	February 1, 2019
Matilda hires detectives Tom and Jerry to locate a heart-shaped cake containing a diamond ring.
62c	10c	"The Last Laugh"	Julie McNally Cahill; Tim Cahill	Christina Mijares	March 29, 2019
Detectives Tom and Jerry helps Red Herring find out whose laughing is driving him crazy.
63a	11a	"The Invisible Cat"	Julie McNally Cahill; Tim Cahill	Dave Farber	March 29, 2019
Tom is chased by a transparent cat inside a haunted house.
63b	11b	"Eagle Eye Jerry"	Denise Downer	Len Simon	March 29, 2019
During Ginger and Rick's camping hike, Jerry befriends and watches over three Eaglets.
63c	11c	"Catching Some Z's"	Julie McNally Cahill; Tim Cahill	Tod Carter	March 29, 2019
Tom is being chased by feline zombies, so he asks Jerry Van Mousling for help.
64a	12a	"Frenemies"	Stephanie Aurelio	Dan Root	March 29, 2019
Tom and Jerry band together to get Butch and his ex-girlfriend back together, so that Butch won't go back to Toodles.
64b	12b	"You Are What You Eat"	Will Finn	Len Simon	March 29, 2019
Rick and Ginger exchange Tom and Spike's food as they eat different kinds of dog and cat food they turn into those animals who eat that type of food.
64c	12c	"Not My Tyke"	Tim Casto	Neal Sternecky	March 29, 2019
Tom and Jerry are ordered by Spike to take care of Tyke while he is gone for a drive. Things get bad when Tyke hides in a bundle of clothes.
65a	13a	"Everyone Into the Pool"	Will Finn	Kevin Reed	March 29, 2019
Tom, Butch, and Meathead are invited by Toodles to her pool but as Toodles says that she will go on a date with whoever wins a game of billiards, Jerry calls in his seal friend from the short: "Little Runaway."
65b	13b	"A Head for Science"	Will Finn	Tod Carter	March 29, 2019
A crazed scientist assigns Tom to keep Jerry Van Mousling from sabotaging his laboratory, but it's only when a monster of Frankenstein proportions come into the fray.
65c	13c	"Cat Cop"	Julie McNally Cahill; Tim Cahill	Robert Sledge	March 29, 2019
Tom messes with Jerry by using a Rat Repellent Spray.
66a	14a	"Dis-Repair Man"	Stephanie Aurelio	Ralph Zondag	March 29, 2019
Tom tries to fix the house to avoid sleeping outside with Spike.
66b	14b	"Double Dog Trouble"	Denise Downer	Dave Farber	March 29, 2019
Spike hires detectives Tom and Jerry to resolve an identity crisis.
66c	14c	"Hockey Jockeys"	Greg Ehrbar	Dan Root	March 29, 2019
When Ginger gets a new air hockey table for Rick on his birthday, Tom, Jerry, Tuffy, and Butch uses and plays with it.
67a	15a	"Hyde and Shriek"	Julie McNally Cahill; Tim Cahill	Tod Carter	March 29, 2019
Tom, Jerry, and Tuffy meets a Dr. Jekyll and Mr. Hyde cat.
67b	15b	"Lightning Bug Blues"	Will Finn	Neal Sternecky	March 29, 2019
Jerry befriends a lightning bug. The lightning bug helps Jerry get even with Tom for leaving the TV light on.
67c	15c	"Perfume Party"	Greg Perkins	Kevin Reed	March 29, 2019
Toodles loves the new perfume Butch got her. Tom goes and makes his own perfume to win her over.
68a	16a	"The Royal Treatment"	Sam Dransfield	Shawn Keller	March 29, 2019
When the chief butler is coming over for an inspection, Jerry poses as him to get his hands on the food, but Tom sees through his disguise.
68b	16b	"The Beast from the Bayou"	Will Finn	Len Simon	March 29, 2019
Toxic waste turns Tom into a Bayou beast.
68c	16c	"Alley Oops!"	Laura Maccabee	Dan Root	March 29, 2019
Butch wants Tom, Jerry, and Spike get him back in the alley when a little tough cat moves in the alley and puts him out.
69a	17a	"All Cat Jazz"	Tim Casto	Tod Carter	March 29, 2019
Frankie manages Tom, Jerry, and Spike to perform in a Jazz trio so he wants food.
69b	17b	"Wrap Star"	Julie McNally Cahill; Tim Cahill	Tod Carter	March 29, 2019
Tom goes into a castle where he encounters a mummy cat.
69c	17c	"Magic Hat Cat"	Will Finn	Shawn Keller	March 29, 2019
When a birthday magician leaves his hat over at Rick and Ginger's house, Tom, Jerry, Spike, and Butch discover it is no ordinary hat.
70a	18a	"Charm School Dropouts"	Will Finn	Neal Sternecky	March 29, 2019
After an unsuccessful attempt by Butch and Tom to charm Toodles, she sends them to a Charm School.
70b	18b	"Driven Crazy"	Ryan Roope	Len Simon	September 26, 2019
When Tom is ordered to wash the car for the Duke and Duchess, he takes it for a spin with Jerry and Tuffy along for the ride.
70c	18c	"A Star Forlorn"	Laura Maccabee	Ralph Zondag	September 26, 2019
Tom is chosen to be a spokescat for Cat Snacks.
71a	19a	"Bird Flue"	Stephanie Aurelio	Jon McClenahan	September 26, 2019
Tom is ordered to sweep the chimney and puts up with two birds and Jerry.
71b	19b	"Tom's Tangled Web"	Stephanie Aurelio	Neal Sternecky	September 26, 2019
A bite from a spider transforms Tom into a spider.
71c	19c	"Saddle Soreheads"	Jonathan Rosenthal	Dan Root	September 26, 2019
When a show champion horse goes missing, Tom is on the lookout for it as Jerry tries to hide the horse.
72a	20a	"Rosemary's Gravy"	Tim Casto	TJ House	September 26, 2019
Ginger's mother, Rosemary, comes to care for an injured Rick. When she throws away the unhealthy food, Rick, Tom, Jerry, and Spike look for unhealthy food since they can't stand her cooking style.
72b	20b	"Eggs on a Train"	Ryan Roope	Tod Carter	September 26, 2019
Detectives Tom and Jerry are hired by a dog to escort his precious egg, but Butch and Meathead try to steal it.
72c	20c	"Truffle Trouble"	Stephanie Aurelio	Jon McClenahan	September 26, 2019
Tom is assigned to bring Truffles for a pig down at a farm.
73a	21a	"Bars and Stripes"	Will Finn	Shawn Keller	September 26, 2019
Tom is wrongfully accused of robbing a jewelry store and he ends up at the Animal Shelter. Jerry helps out by clearing his name.
73b	21b	"Cuckoo Clock"	Amanda Jaros	Neal Sternecky	September 26, 2019
Ginger warns Tom not to break her family heirloom cuckoo clock, and he does it by accident. He attempts to fix it before Ginger comes back from a game of golf.
73c	21c	"Plant Food"	Stephanie Aurelio	Len Simon	September 26, 2019
Tom goes to a castle that has a greenhouse that has man-eating plants.
74a	22a	"Whack a Gopher"	Stephanie Aurelio	Tod Carter	September 26, 2019
Tom must get rid of the gopher that's been eating the garden food.
74b	22b	"Hula Whoops"	Tim Casto	Shawn Keller	September 26, 2019
Detectives Tom and Jerry travel with Toodles to Hawaii for a case.
74c	22c	"A Game of Bones"	Will Finn	TJ House	September 26, 2019
When Spike thinks a black bone that Tom has found is cursed, Spike becomes nice to Tom.
75a	23a	"Bull Fight"	Will Finn	Ed Baker	December 2, 2019
Detectives Tom and Jerry try to stop a 40-year-old turtle from fighting against a bull in the boxing ring.
75b	23b	"No Contest"	Jonathan Rosenthal	Tod Carter	December 2, 2019
When Spike enters Tyke in the Puppy Olympics, he gets Tom to help train Tyke.
75c	23c	"Calorie Count"	Jonathan Rosenthal	Dan Root	December 2, 2019
Jerry's uncle, Count DeCalorie, visits and shows that he's not overweight anymore, but all the delicious food he eats, puts the weight back on him.
76a	24a	"Fortune Hunters"	Stephanie Aurelio	Shawn Keller	December 2, 2019
Detectives Tom and Jerry are on the case to bring back a smelly dog's fortune.
76b	24b	"Game Changer"	Will Finn	TJ House	December 2, 2019
Tom walks into a castle to discover a checkerboard game has come to life.
76c	24c	"Kiss and Makeup"	Stephanie Aurelio	Neal Sternecky	December 2, 2019
New neighbor Misty Makeup Mavin is selling beauty makeup and wants a kiss from Tom. Jerry and Tuffy attempt to stop the kiss from happening.
77a	25a	"Suitable for Framing"	Amanda Jaros	Tammy Zeitler	December 2, 2019
Life really does imitate art for Tom when a ghost artist paints a nice picture of him and the picture seems to change whenever Tom has a different thing happen to him.
77b	25b	"Springtime for Spike"	Jim Finn	Tod Carter	December 2, 2019
Spike falls in love with a French poodle named Sabrina who takes more of a liking to Tom than him.
77c	25c	"Knighty Knight Knight"	Stephanie Aurelio	Jon McClenahan	December 2, 2019
Tom, Jerry, and Tuffy discover that a knight suit has 3 kittens inside of it.
78a	26a	"Phan-Tom of the Oompah"	Sam Dransfield	Tammy Zeitler	December 2, 2019
It's up to Jerry Van Mousling to stop Tom as "The Phantom of the Oompah."
78b	26b	"Ballad of the Catnip Kid"	Tim Casto; Jeremy Mann	Will Finn; Len Simon	December 2, 2019
Tom dreams that he is the Catnip Kid up against Sheriff Jerry.
78c	26c	"Mirror Image"	Sam Dransfield	Jon McClenahan	December 2, 2019
When the mirrors break in the castle, Tom, Jerry, and Tuffy are cursed with bad luck when they stumble upon a mirror that has mischievous versions of Tom in it.

=== Season 4 (2021) ===
No. overall	No. in season	Title	Story by	Storyboard by	Original release date
79a	1a	"Gym Rat"	Wade Randolph	Steve Horrocks	February 1, 2021
Tom can't sleep because the new body-building Jerry is disturbing him. So he starts lifting weights, which sets up an epic battle royale between him and Jerry.
79b	1b	"Scrunch Time"	Julie McNally Cahill; Tim Cahill	Tammy Zeitler	February 1, 2021
Tom becomes obsessed with his new crinkle ball and drives the rest of the household crazy, chasing it around.
79c	1c	"Mice from Mars"	Will Finn	Sean Bishop	February 1, 2021
A team of Martian mice visitors arrive, form an alliance with Jerry, and force Tom to change how he treats Jerry.
80a	2a	"The Maltese Pigeon"	Will Finn	Robert Sledge	February 1, 2021
Detectives Tom and Jerry are hired to find a missing priceless Maltese Pigeon.
80b	2b	"Loch Ness Mess"	Amanda Jaros	Len Simon	February 1, 2021
Tom enlists the help of the lake monster to help terrorize the Catsylvania town. The German mice complain to Jerry the Commander about this Lake Monster. Can anyone stop the monster from destroying the Catsylvanian mouse army?
80c	2c	"Werewolf of Catsylvania"	Will Finn	Tod Carter	February 1, 2021
There is a little puppy in Catsylvania who turns to a werewolf if sunlight struck him. Tom, who gets afraid of the puppy, tries to complain to the German mice and Jerry, but they don't see anything such as a werewolf.
81a	3a	"The Great Catsby"	John Edwards	Robert Sledge	February 1, 2021
Tom must compete with his American cousin, Catsby, for the right to remain a butler at Postlewaite Manor.
81b	3b	"A Class of Their Own"	Sam Dransfield	Scott O'Brien	February 1, 2021
When Tom and Jerry's detective licence expires, they go to the police station to train yet some "familiar" classmates come as they want to "change sides".
81c	3c	"Yeti, Set, Go"	Amanda Jaros	Neal Sternecky	February 1, 2021
When Tom inadvertently sets a yeti loose on the town, Jerry Van Mousling must subdue the beast.
82a	4a	"Ghoul's Gold"	Easton Gage	Len Simon	February 1, 2021
Tom serves as an evil pirate determined to steal treasure belonging to the village mice.
82b	4b	"What About Blob?"	John Edwards	Shawn Keller	February 1, 2021
Tom turns into a blob monster and proceeds to eat everything in sight, including the village mice.
82c	4c	"Mouse Party"	Jordan Gershowitz	Tod Carter	February 1, 2021
Tom and Jerry have a house party, but things turn messy. Can they clean up the mess before Rick and Ginger come home?
83a	5a	"Maust"	Mimi Hess	Neal Sternecky	February 1, 2021
Tom is tricked into helping an evil magician capture all of the mice in the village, but Jerry Van Mousling foils the magician's plans.
83b	5b	"Tom Prix"	Stephanie Aurelio	Scott O'Brien	February 1, 2021
Tom, forced into driving a race car created by evil Dr. Otto, terrorizes the village mice until Jerry Van Mousling comes to their rescue.
83c	5c	"Hip Replacement"	Luke Giordano	Tod Carter	February 1, 2021
The neighbor's cat turns out to be a hipster whose laid-back attitudes and behaviors are soon adopted by Tom and the other alley cats.
84a	6a	"Cat-a-Combs"	Mimi Hess	Tammy Zeitler; Tod Carter	February 1, 2021
When Tom falls into a manhole, he finds a magic cloak that transforms him into the King of the Catacombs.
84b	6b	"Cat-astrophic Failure"	John Edwards	Todd Cronin	February 1, 2021
After Spike leaves Tom in charge of keeping an eye on Tyke, Tyke starts to behave more like a cat and less like a dog.
84c	6c	"Un-Welcome Home"	Tim Casto; Jeremy Mann	Neal Sternecky	February 1, 2021
Sick of taking the heat for Jerry's shenanigans, Tom packs his bags and goes home to his birth family.
85a	7a	"Downton Crabby"	Ryan Roope	Shawn Keller	February 1, 2021
Tom is tasked by the maid to cook a crab for the lord's dinner, but Jerry helps the crab escape only to have it go against him when he tries to save Tom from the crab's friends.
85b	7b	"The Devil You Know"	Jim Praytor; Robert Zappia	TJ House	February 1, 2021
A guilty conscience causes Butch to change his ways. But Tom, Jerry, Spike, and Tuffy quickly decide they like the old Butch better.
85c	7c	"Duck Sitting"	Ryan Roope	TJ House	February 1, 2021
Tom and Jerry must keep Little Quacker safe from the imminent danger of Butch and Meathead so he can testify in court.
86a	8a	"A Clown Without Pity"	Will Finn	Tod Carter	February 1, 2021
Trouble ensues for everyone when Tom is recruited by an evil ringmaster to help him snare the Catsylvania mice.
86b	8b	"Three Heads Are Better Than One"	Ryan Roope	Tammy Zeitler	February 1, 2021
Tom, Jerry Van Mousling, and a group of the village mice deal with a three-headed dog that Tom accidentally awakens.
86c	8c	"Dam Busters"	Mark Fellows	Jon Hooper	February 1, 2021
Tom is forced to cut all the required firewood for the manor fireplaces in the town while Jerry harasses him.
87a	9a	"Counting Sheep"	Mimi Hess	Scott O'Brien	February 1, 2021
Tom and Jerry set out to investigate the case of a missing sheep, but exhaustion threatens to throw their entire investigation off track.
87b	9b	"The Old Gray Hair"	Tim Casto	Len Simon	February 1, 2021
After discovering a gray hair, Spike decides he's too old to be the alpha of the house, which sends Tom into full bully mode.
87c	9c	"Chutes and Tatters"	Ryan Roope	Jon McClenahan	February 1, 2021
Tom is tasked with doing the laundry, but Jerry's antics make his job far more difficult than he could ever have anticipated.
88a	10a	"(Not) Your Father's Mouse-Stache"	Will Finn	Robert Sledge	February 1, 2021
Tom drinks a hair growing juice that grows him a mustache that instantly makes him popular with the ladies, but it doesn't take long for Butch and Jerry to interfere.
88b	10b	"Balloonatics"	Will Finn	Neal Sternecky	February 1, 2021
Tom and Jerry fight each other with the balloons that Rick has placed all over the house to surprise Ginger on their anniversary.
88c	10c	"Ball of Fame"	Stephanie Aurelio	Todd Cronin	February 1, 2021
When Tom and Jerry's antics unearth an autographed baseball, a childhood souvenir of Rick's, he warns Tom to keep his paws off it, or else.
89a	11a	"Mega Tom"	Jordan Gershowitz	Tod Carter	February 1, 2021
Frankenstein turns Tom into a colossus, and Tom ends up terrorizing the village mice, until Jerry Van Mousling saves the day.
89b	11b	"Jabberwock"	Will Finn	Dave Farber	February 1, 2021
Jerry Van Mousling is at a campfire reading a jabberwock poem story: "Beware the jabberwock."
89c	11c	"My Buddy Guard"	Will Finn	Shawn Keller	February 1, 2021
Tuffy fixes up a toy robot that befriends him, but it doesn’t take long for things to get out of control.
90a	12a	"Hangin' Tough"	Jordan Gershowitz	Len Simon	February 1, 2021
Tom decides to battle against Butch in order to prove to Toodles that he's more of a gentleman than him.
90b	12b	"Shadow of a Doubt"	Will Finn	Robert Sledge	February 1, 2021
Detectives Tom and Jerry desperately try to help George and Junior find a black panther that has gone missing from the zoo.
90c	12c	"It's the Little Things"	Jordan Gershowitz	Scott O'Brien	February 1, 2021
When Tom drinks a potion given to him by a gypsy woman and shrinks to the size of an insect, he must beg Jerry Van Mouseling for help in finding a cure.
91a	13a	"Always Say Never Again"	John Edwards	Neal Sternecky	February 1, 2021
Tom and Jerry are hired by a British super spy to help guard the queen's precious objects while they are on display in the city.
91b	13b	"Into the Woods"	Stephanie Aurelio	Len Simon	February 1, 2021
When an accident leaves Jerry wrapped in bandages and unable to take his scout troop camping, Tom, who felt sorry for what he did, decides to lead the troop into the woods.
91c	13c	"Mice Fair Ladies"	Tim Casto; Jeremy Mann	Jon McClenahan	February 1, 2021
Jerry's British cousins, Oliver and Alistair, come for a visit because they forget their wives' birthdays. It doesn’t take long for Tom and Jerry to get annoyed.
92a	14a	"Hot Wings"	Ryan Roope	Todd Cronin	February 1, 2021
A lemur belonging to the duchess' adventurous cousin puts Tom's job as an under-butler in jeopardy.
92b	14b	"Wild Goose Chase"	Will Finn	Robert Sledge	February 1, 2021
Detectives Tom and Jerry try to escort a goofy Canadian goose back across the border before duck season begins.
92c	14c	"Play Date with Destiny"	Stephanie Aurelio	Neal Sternecky	February 1, 2021
Tom is jealous that Jerry is having fun on his play date with Emily and tries to ruin it.
93a	15a	"Mind Your Royal Manners"	Denise Downer	Hank Tucker	February 1, 2021
Tom adopts the attitude of a member of the Royal Guard to keep the mice from wreaking havoc.
93b	15b	"A Rare Breed"	Will Finn	Celia Kendrick	February 1, 2021
Jerry is mistaken for a rare breed of guinea pig by Duchess' friend, Professor Dimple, then uses his protected elevated status to create problems for Tom.
93c	15c	"Oh, Brother"	Eric Jorgensen	Tod Carter	February 1, 2021
Spike's big brother, Max, shows up on the run from some bad guys and Spike must enlist the help of Tuffy, Tom, and Jerry to get rid of him.
94a	16a	"Who Sled the Dogs Out?"	John Edwards	Shawn Keller	February 1, 2021
Detectives Tom and Jerry try to help a team of huskies find the villain determined to sabotage their dog sled race.
94b	16b	"Tick, Tick, Tick"	Mimi Hess	Celia Kendrick	February 1, 2021
A tick takes up residence in Tom's fur and Jerry decides to torment him.
94c	16c	"The Butterfly Effect"	Will Finn	TJ House	February 1, 2021
Jerry and his nappy-wearing friend, Tuffy, craft butterfly wings that they use to fly around and steal food with. However, it doesn't take long for Tom to interfere.
95a	17a	"Curiosity Thrilled the Cat"	Will Finn	Hank Tucker	February 1, 2021
Rick and Ginger tell Tom to stay away from their wrapped present, but it doesn't take long for Tom and Jerry’s curiosity to get the better of them.
95b	17b	"The Wearing of the Green"	Ryan Roope	Neal Sternecky	February 1, 2021
Jerry helps a leprechaun retrieve the emerald green rose that he's lost to Cates.
95c	17c	"Ball of Fire"	Will Finn	Tod Carter	February 1, 2021
The hot dog relish that crooked Eddie brings to detectives Tom and Jerry turns to be an explosive device that they must return to the lab before it blows up the entire city.
96a	18a	"The Masked Mouse"	Rob Janas; Kevin Fleming	Matthew Bates	February 1, 2021
Tuffy surprises Jerry with a visit from the actor who plays his favorite TV show character, "The Masked Mouse". It turns out the actor is a prima donna who makes everyone's lives miserable.
96b	18b	"Flower Power"	Rob Janas; Kevin Fleming	Tod Carter	February 1, 2021
Tom and Jerry try to replace the flowers Rick had brought for Ginger after they accidentally ruin them.
96c	18c	"Polar Excess"	Rob Janas; Kevin Fleming	Celia Kendrick	February 1, 2021
Tom and Jerry have to contend with a baby polar bear that has been mistakenly delivered to Rick and Ginger's house.
97a	19a	"Un-Easy Chair"	Amanda Jaros	Hank Tucker	February 1, 2021
Tom, Jerry, and Rick try to relax in an automatic chair. However, it doesn't take long for them to cause mayhem.
97b	19b	"Something to Crow About"	Jordan Gershowitz	Shawn Keller	February 1, 2021
Jerry Van Mousling helps Tom escape a living scarecrow that is terrorizing Catsylvania.
97c	19c	"Hush Puppy"	Eric Jorgensen	Darin McGowan	February 1, 2021
Rosemary drops off her giant dog Goliath at Ginger's house. While he is sleeping, Tom, Jerry, and Tuffy take utmost care to stay very quiet in order not to wake up Goliath.
98a	20a	"Dog Star Spike"	Will Finn	Dave Farber	February 1, 2021
The Mice from Mars return and make mischief between Spike and Tom.
98b	20b	"Donut Daze"	Will Finn	Celia Kendrick	February 1, 2021
Tom is tasked to take care of the donuts.
98c	20c	"Tom's Cruise"	Will Finn	Jordan Koch	February 1, 2021
Tom and Jerry take an unexpected trip on a cruise to France.
99a	21a	"Ten Toms the Trouble"	Eric Jorgensen	Tod Carter	February 1, 2021
Tom uses a machine to make copies of himself to get all of his work done, but Jerry also does the same.
99b	21b	"Turkey Tom"	Ryan Roope	Neal Sternecky	February 1, 2021
Tom and Jerry work together to save a live turkey from becoming the centerpiece of a holiday feast.
99c	21c	"Tom Save the Queen"	Mike Berman	Celia Kendrick	February 1, 2021
The queen is making a royal visit to the mansion. Cates insists Tom to do chores to get ready for the queen.
100a	22a	"Party Animals"	Will Finn	Jordan Koch	February 1, 2021
Tom must organize a grand birthday party for the Duke's nephew, but a puppy gets in his way.
100b	22b	"Tap Cat"	Will Finn	Celia Kendrick	February 1, 2021
An old pair of Ginger's tap shoes turns Tom into a dancing fanatic.
100c	22c	"The Ol' Switcheroo"	Eric Jorgensen	Darin McGowan	February 1, 2021
Tuffy's wish to be as strong as Spike comes true, which causes him and Spike to switch strength.
101a	23a	"How to Be a Dog"	Ryan Roope	TJ House	February 1, 2021
Spike demonstrates how to be a dog.
101b	23b	"See Ya Gator"	Will Finn	Matthew Bates	February 1, 2021
An alligator hatchling causes chaos in the house.
101c	23c	"All That Glitters"	Rob Janas; Kevin Fleming	Neal Sternecky	February 1, 2021
Detectives Tom and Jerry chase a jewel thief.
102a	24a	"Junkyard Pup"	Eric Jorgensen	Tod Carter	February 1, 2021
Tyke goes to a junkyard.
102b	24b	"The French Mistake"	Stephanie Aurelio	Hank Tucker	February 1, 2021
Tom must groom a prize-winning poodle.
102c	24c	"A Kick in the Tail"	Rob Janas; Kevin Fleming	Tobias Schwarz	February 1, 2021
Tuffy wants to learn how to play soccer, so Jerry teaches him to play.
103a	25a	"Broom for Improvement"	Will Finn	Marc Camelbeke	February 1, 2021
One night, the witch replaced her broom with a new one. In the morning, Tom finds the broom and uses it for his chores.
103b	25b	"Puppy Guard"	Rob Janas; Kevin Fleming	Tod Carter	February 1, 2021
Spike attempts to protect tyke.
103c	25c	"Bones of Contention"	Tim Casto	Hank Tucker	February 1, 2021
Spike's bones are missing and Frankie is the culprit. Now all they have to do is catch in the dirty rat in the act.
104a	26a	"Farmed and Dangerous"	Will Finn	Dave Farber	February 1, 2021
Tom must retrieve a stolen egg.
104b	26b	"Slam Dunk"	Rob Janas; Kevin Fleming	Neal Sternecky	February 1, 2021
Detectives Tom and Jerry search for a basketball player's lucky shoes.
104c	26c	"Attachment Disorder"	Eric Jorgensen	TJ House	February 1, 2021
Rick finishes his model airplane just in time for Father's Day and lets it dry after applying extra strong glue; Tom, Jerry, and Spike fidget with the super strong glue after breaking the model during a chase.

=== Season 5 (2021) ===
No. overall	No. in season	Title	Story by	Storyboard by	Original release date
105a	1a	"Giant Problems"	Will Finn	Tod Carter	February 15, 2021
Papa tells the fractured version of Jack and the Beanstalk to the German mice.
105b	1b	"Eight Legs, No Waiting"	Bob Perkins; Ryan Self	Celia Kendrick	February 15, 2021
Tom tries to get rid of a spider that Rick and Ginger are afraid of.
105c	1c	"Ape for Tom and Jerry"	Kevin Fleming; Rob Janas	Bob Scott	February 15, 2021
Tom leaves his house after he thinks his owners forgotten his birthday, and leaves his house but he accidentally fell in a barrel and ends up getting sent to an ape.
106a	2a	"Hold the Cheese"	Michael Dan Berman	Hank Tucker	February 15, 2021
After going on a diet, Rick sleepwalks and is helped by Tom and Jerry to get food at Freaky Frankie's.
106b	2b	"Cave Cat"	Eric Jorgensen	Marc Camelbeke	February 15, 2021
A prehistoric cave cat, who looks like Tom, escapes from a laboratory after getting unfrozen.
106c	2c	"Not So Grand Canyon"	Michael Dan Berman	Shawn Keller	February 15, 2021
Tom and Jerry take the scouts camping.
107a	3a	"The Three Little Mice"	Will Finn	Tod Carter	February 15, 2021
Papa recounts the Three Little Pigs as Tom tries to knock down the mices' houses.
107b	3b	"A Kick in the Butler"	Tim Casto	Neal Sternecky	February 15, 2021
After Cates gets an injury, Tom has to fill for the wrestle for Postlewaite Manor honor.
107c	3c	"Tom Thumblestein"	Will Finn	Tod Carter	February 15, 2021
Papa tells the version of the Tom Thumb story.
108a	4a	"Sock It to Me"	Analisa Labianco; Jeff Spencer	Bob Scott	February 15, 2021
Pontius Pig hires detectives Tom and Jerry to investigate a Rash-O-Socks theft doing his laundromat business.
108b	4b	"Pumpkin Punks"	Ryan Roope	Celia Kendrick	February 15, 2021
Tom tries to take care of the pumpkin to be the winner while Jerry tries to destroy it.
108c	4c	"Para-Abnormal Activities"	Kevin Fleming; Rob Janas	Bob Scott	February 15, 2021
Jerry pretends to be a ghost to terrorize Tom after Rick and Ginger watch a scary movie. Jerry scares him until he gets a fright of his own.
109a	5a	"I Dream of Jerry"	Eric Jorgensen	TJ House	February 15, 2021
Jerry, and his nappy-wearing friend, Tuffy, find a genie and he asks them for three wishes. Tom and Butch use the genie for their own wishes.
109b	5b	"Piñata Yadda Yadda"	Will Finn	Dave Farber	February 15, 2021
It takes place in the western desert where Tom is in charge of keeping a pinata.
109c	5c	"Mr. Nobody"	Will Finn	Neal Sternecky	February 15, 2021
Tuffy hires detectives Tom and Jerry to investigate stuff his imaginary friend Mr. Nobody is doing that Tuffy didn't do.
110a	6a	"Me and My Big Foot"	Will Finn	Hank Tucker	February 15, 2021
Tom tries to take a picture of Bigfoot. Jerry befriends him for a picnic food grub.
110b	6b	"Little Red Katzen Hood"	Will Finn	Tod Carter	February 15, 2021
Papa recount the story "Little Red Riding Hood".
110c	6c	"Professor Meathead"	Analisa Labianco; Jeff Spencer	Bob Scott	February 15, 2021
Meathead turns into a genius when he gulps down a bottle of specially formulated water which raises his IQ.
111a	7a	"Pranks for Nothing"	Spen Jarvis	Celia Kendrick	February 15, 2021
It's the battle of the soldier angels when pranks amok on April Fools Day.
111b	7b	"Dry Hard"	Michael Dan Berman	Bob Scott	February 15, 2021
A stranger with a divining rod promises to find water for the farm.
111c	7c	"Tom Quixote"	Bob Perkins; Ryan Self	Tod Carter	February 15, 2021
A knock on the head turns Tom into Quixote and leads him into battle with Butch over Toodles' affections.
112a	8a	"Top Dog"	Kevin Fleming; Rob Janas	TJ House	February 15, 2021
The gang get more than they bargained for when the dog next door shows up.
112b	8b	"Rikki Tikki Tabby"	Steven Darancette	Hank Tucker	February 15, 2021
The Duke returns from India with some ferocious wild animals, which escape their cages and begin to terrorize the manor, so Tom is tasked with putting everything back in order.
112c	8c	"Day of the Jackalope"	Will Finn	Shawn Keller	February 15, 2021
The mother coyote tells her three baby coyotes about the story of the Jackalope.
113a	9a	"Diamonds Are for Never"	Kevin Fleming; Rob Janas	Neal Sternecky	February 15, 2021
The Cat and Mouse Detectives are hired to find a missing rare diamond.
113b	9b	"Camelot Cat"	Will Finn	Bob Scott	February 15, 2021
Tom and Jerry save King Arthur's kingdom from an evil sorcerer, Morgan.
113c	9c	"Big Pig"	Bob Perkins; Ryan Self	Jon McClenahan	February 15, 2021
A bet between two farmers over who can raise the biggest pig goes haywire for the farm hands.
114a	10a	"Millennium Mouse"	Zach Mekelburg	Hank Tucker	February 15, 2021
An ancient flying machine is discovered in Postlewaite Manor.
114b	10b	"Grumpelstiltskin"	Zach Mekelburg	Tod Carter	February 15, 2021
An oompah land retelling of the Rumplestiltskin story.
114c	10c	"Tuxedo Junction"	Sam Kwasman	Dave Farber	February 15, 2021
Quacker's penguin cousin, Tuxedo, comes for a visit.
115a	11a	"A Treehouse Divided"	Bob Perkins; Ryan Self	TJ House	February 15, 2021
From the security of his treehouse, Tom wages battle with Spike and Jerry.
115b	11b	"Crazy for Ewe"	Eric Jorgensen	Shawn Keller	February 15, 2021
A lost little lamb appears at Maude's farm.
115c	11c	"Tommy Appleseed"	Zach Mekelburg	Bob Scott	February 15, 2021
Tom and Jerry take on the Johnny Appleseed story.
116a	12a	"Doghouse Rock"	Tim Casto; Jeremy Mann	Tod Carter	February 15, 2021
Tom is accidentally placed in an animal shelter, then gets out and starts a rock band.
116b	12b	"Downsizing"	Kevin Fleming; Rob Janas	Bob Scott	February 15, 2021
The gang becomes determined to make Rick and Ginger change their mind about downsizing and moving to the big city by making it impossible to sell the house.
116c	12c	"Lord Spike"	Kevin Fleming; Rob Janas	Marc Camelbeke; Dave Farber	February 15, 2021
A lineage check determines that Spike is descended from British aristocracy.
117a	13a	"Disappearing Tom"	Kevin Fleming; Rob Janas	Hank Tucker	February 15, 2021
Tom is tricked into believing he is invisible.
117b	13b	"Officer Tyke"	Bob Perkins; Ryan Self	Jon McClenahan	February 15, 2021
Tyke undergoes a personality change after watching too many cop shows on TV.
117c	13c	"The Not So Ugly Duckling"	Will Finn	Tod Carter	February 15, 2021
A couple of tricksters use Little Quacker as their "magnificent" side show act in order to bilk the locals out of their cash.

=== Films (2022) ===
Title	Story by	Storyboard by	Original release date
"Cowboy Up!"	Story by : Will Finn; Teleplay by : William Waldner	Jared Bookstrand; Mark Camelbeke; Alfredo Cassano; Joanna Davidovich; Brad Goodchild; TJ House; Jose Pepe Mansuy; Alec Megibben; Patrick Reyntens; Randy Young	January 25, 2022
The Wild, Wild West just got wilder with Tom and Jerry on the ranch! This time, the rivals team up to help a cowgirl and her brother save their homestead from a greedy land-grabber, and they're going to need some help! Jerry's three precocious nephews are all ready for action, and Tom is rounding up a posse of prairie dogs. But can a ragtag band of varmints defeat a deceitful desperado determined to deceive a damsel-in-distress? No matter what happens, with Tom and Jerry in the saddle, it'll be a rootin-tootin' good time!
"Snowman's Land"	Story by : Will Finn; Jase Ricci; Teleplay by : Jase Ricci	Dave Álvarez; Mark Camelbeke; Will Finn; Richard Gaines; Kevin Harkey; Dan Jeup; Jose Pepe Mansuy; Alec Megibben; Bob Scott; Hank Tucker	November 15, 2022
It's time to chase that holiday spirit with Tom and Jerry! With magic in the air, Jerry and his nephew, Tuffy, make a snow mouse that miraculously comes to life! To keep their new friend, Larry the snow mouse, from melting, Tuffy and Jerry must race him to the fabled Snowman's Village. In hot pursuit, Tom and devious Dr. Doublevay have their own plans for Larry's magic. Get ready to go dashing through this epic tale filled with songs, snow, thrills, laughs and even a bit of holiday magic!
