= Planet Sketch =

- Title card for the second season
- Genre: Animated series Sketch comedy Slapstick
- Written by: Nicholas Barber; Annie Caulfield; Marc Haynes; Jono Howard
- Directed by: Andy Wyatt; Vamberto Maduro
- Voices of: Morwenna Banks; Paul Bazely; Clare Corbett; Johnny Daukes; Mark Evans; Teresa Gallagher; Lucy Jules; Kate Harbour; Gordon Kennedy; Burt Kwouk; Adam Longworth; Alan Marriott; Felicity Montagu; Lucy Montgomery; Tom Parkinson; Rob Rackstraw; Maria Darling; Paul Shearer; Alistair McGowan; John Sparkes; Lizzie Stables; Emma Tate; Tabitha Wady; Keith Wickham; Jo Wyatt; Janet Brown
- Composers: Eggplant LF, Inc. (Note: A team of music composers consisting of Steve D'Angelo and Terry Tompkins)
- Countries of origin: United Kingdom; Canada
- Original language: English
- No. of seasons: 2
- No. of episodes: 39

Production
- Executive producers: Miles Bullough; Peter Lord; David Sproxton; Neil Court; Steven DeNure; Beth Stevenson
- Producers: Sarah Fell (S2); Elana Adair (S2); Series Producer: Helen Brunsdon
- Editors: Andrew Blyskokz; Nikk Fielden; Clem Hobbs
- Running time: 11 minutes
- Production companies: Aardman Animations; Decode Entertainment (Note: As Decode/Sketch Productions Inc. or Decode/Sketch Productions 2 Inc.)

Original release
- Network: CITV (U.K.)
- Release: 10 September 2005 – 30 December 2007
- Network: Teletoon (Canada)
- Release: 19 November 2005 – 30 December 2007

Planet Sketch is an animated television series co-produced by Aardman Animations and Decode Entertainment, with animation production provided by C.O.R.E. Toons. The series was first aired on CITV on 10 September 2005, and later began airing on the Canadian network Teletoon on 19 November 2005. Planet Sketch, mainly its second season, is also featured in Shorts in a Bunch on Nicktoons Network. The series ended its run on 30 December 2007. 39 episodes were produced.

== Overview ==
Planet Sketch is basically a variety series; every episode features an assortment of sketches. What happens in the first one that appears is where the episode title comes from, that being Nose Picker. From then on, several sketches are played out to fill the remainder of the show, culminating with June Spume and Melville, in which a girl named June Spume re-shapes part of her body into a musical instrument and plays said instrument while the credits roll.

Typically only one of each different sketch appears per episode, but sometimes a sketch appear twice or doesn't appear at all. Most sketches are 3-D, but in the first season there were 2-D sketches, which were more rare and often have multiple segments. These segments play between 3-D sketches, which are treated as regular ones, and tend to be slightly shorter in runtime. Some 2-D sketches even appear only once throughout the series.

Planet Sketch received a fairly large overhaul with the second season. Nose Picker stays as one of the sketches that can appear first in an episode, but is now joined by Ninja Handyman and once even Parping Ponies. This season adds a few new 3-D sketches to the mix, but most of the original sketches, including all 2-D ones, were completely scrapped. There are now transitions between sketches; Some show characters dancing or gesturing, others show the logo sign playing a short clip of a sketch from another episode of this season. Additionally, the graphic and animation quallity were decently improved and the artstyle was revamped to akin to that of Nick Park (a major animator at Aardman).

== Sketches ==
=== Original 3D sketches ===
- Nose Picker: A girl named Olivia picks unexpected items from out her nose, such as food, toys, and sometimes even other characters. This can, but usually doesn't cause trouble.
- Ninja Handyman: A family resorts to the help of a ninja to solve everyday mundane problems (such as using a rolling pin to squeeze the last few dollops of toothpaste from its tube). In the first season, the family liked Ninja Handyman, but in the second season, it gets really annoyed and irritated more often than not when he appears. In the first season, Ninja Handyman works very hard in anything he does, but in the second season, he is rather lazy, a bit careless, somewhat insane, and accident-prone.
- Japanese Fighting Fish: Three fish named Robby (orange), Billy (green or teal) and Mac (pink) claim to be "real hard" Japanese fighting fish. Their usual adventure includes bullying another (typically much larger) fish that is cohabiting in the same tank, or another sea creature or an item, only for the said fish/sea creature/item to retaliate in kind. Billy and Mac ended their days of bullying in Season 2, but Robby kept on with it.
- Parping Ponies: Two horses, Horace and his aunt Hortense, try to avoid the embarrassment that usually results from Horace's flatulence problem. Sometimes, but rarely, Hortense also has flatulence. The two keep getting fired from jobs and ruining events due to said flatulence.
- Mr. Hives and Timbo: A boy named Timbo tries to avoid his teddy bear Mr. Hives, which he claims to have outgrown. Mr. Hives inevitably reappears with his ominous catchphrase "Huggy huggy!". He appears in all manner of places, including in a ketchup bottle, behind the Gnaughty Gnomes and on television.
- Napkin Squirrel: A storyteller tells the story of a paper (origami) squirrel and what it considers fun in various situations and locations — the things that harm the squirrel in any way, shape, or form are said to be "no fun at all".
- Dr. Inosaur: A dinosaur doctor tries to eat his patients, but usually fails. In the first season, he works in the doctor's office at a clinic. But in the second season, he works at a hospital and tries to eat his patients anyway he can without being interrupted by the speaker (as seen in "Yoga").
- Captain Gagtastic: The namesake supervillain terrorizes a blonde couple, and by extension their family, at different points in their life (such as when they proposed to get married, or their son's seventh birthday) by telling anti-jokes and humiliates them instead of making them laugh.
- Rude Limerick Boy: A boy is booted up on stage to perform a limerick, in which one word is typically unsuitable for the audience, so he is interrupted before saying it, usually by an object from his limerick.
- Mad Dad Scientist: A father pretends to be a mad scientist about to finish an invention, only to be interrupted by his son Kirk, which at the same time reveals that the father was simply repairing a common household item, or doing a household task, such as getting a spider out of the bathtub.
- The Gnaughty Gnomes: An elderly lady (or occasionally a member of the Ninja Handyman family) is enamoured by a set of lawn gnomes, only to faint in shock when discovering that the three or four gnomes are alive and acting in a typically destructive manner.
- News Casters: News anchors Mike Today and Sally Van have gender wars by taking shots at the opposite gender. It is suggested they were dating with complementing each other at the end of each sketch, and they kiss in the first-season finale. In the second season, the romance aspect was completely removed.
- Street Rappers: A group of three Roadman street rappers do something in a manner that is completely different from their image (mostly immature things or even girly), only to be caught by an innocent bystander, who is one of the members of the Ninja Handyman family. In the second season, they would rap like normal, one of them would say something dumb, and the other two would exclaim.
- Why the Dinosaurs Died Out: A humorous take on why dinosaurs became extinct "60 million years ago last Tuesday". Often listed with inconvenient numbers such as 1G or 7.5.
- June Spume and Melville: A girl shapes parts of her body into various instruments and then plays them while her cat dances. Culminates all Season 1 Episodes.

=== Season 1 (2005) ===
==== Recurring 2-D sketches ====
- My Mother the Armchair: A teenage girl consistently becomes embarrassed by her mother: a yellow armchair with a purse.
- Swapsy: A girl tries to swap an array of miscellaneous objects for an item that she sees with a random person (ex. the mother of a small boy).
- Only Joking: A young boy asks his father why something is or why it happens, such why bees collect honey, and his father jokingly replies with fictional comments (ex. Only honey bees collect honey, it's the brain bees you should look out for) which usually results with the boy running away screaming and the father saying "Only joking, son! Dear, oh dear". However, the father's "joke" turns out to be true during the last sketch shown in each episode, and it backfires on him.
- Ira and Lyra: Two girls tell their mother a goofy fake story to get each other in trouble about why one of them, for example, poured water on the other, only to be caught out for a small detail such as where the bus they get on stops.
- Okay Coach, I'm Ready: A boy named Nathan dresses up to be prepared for a sport, only to find he's ready for the wrong sport as indicated by his coach.

==== One-off 2-D sketches ====
- Bill and Phil: Two boys reveal themselves to be disguised in successive costumes of characters from outer space, such as an alien.
- Talent Show: A talent show featuring an assortment of unusual characters with unique abilities.
- Alien Game Show: An extraterrestrial game show featuring aliens that talk gibberish alien language. The host gives a question to the four alien contestants, and when they got the answer right, they get a point. If they got it wrong, they lose a point and get punished.
- Dragon Burping Contest: Another game show, where two dragons must overpower each other and gain points by burping.

=== Season 2 (2006–2007) ===
==== New 3-D sketches ====
- The Useless Starship Computer: Two spacemen named Jake and Captain are always in the cockpit of their spaceship and have problems with their computer (stylized as a metallic silver head with pink hair and baby blue eyes) who acts like a human or acts stupidly. Jake has an English accent, whereas Captain has a Canadian one.
- Mesmo Mutt: A poodle always gets what he wants because he hypnotizes people, mostly his owners, into doing bizarre things, including things household animals do.
- Super Ninja Handyman: Ninja Handyman's once-occurring counterpart, white-dressed and really more helpful than the normal Ninja Handyman (in this season).
- Melville: Replacing "June Spume and Melville", now he works janitor that breaks into dance when the lights turn on. The music always differs each episode. Culminates all Season 2 episodes.

== Production ==
Development for Planet Sketch was announced on 6 October 2004 when Bristol-based stop-motion animation company Aardman Animations had joined forces with Toronto-based Canadian entertainment & animation studio Decode Entertainment to develop and produce a CGI/Flash animated hybrid television series for Teletoon and CITV entitled The Sketch Show, thus Aardman's first international co-produced series and its first CGI-animated series (which predated its first CGI film Flushed Away (which real life water would ruin its stop-motion models) released two years later in 2006, and Lloyd of the Flies, its first CGI-animated production without the involvement of another company released seventeen years later), with Aardman's co-founders Peter Lord and David Sproxton alongside its head of broadcast Miles Bullough serving as executive producers alongside Decode Entertainment's co-founders Steven DeNure and Neil Court alongside Beth Stevenson. One year later on 31 March 2005, the series was renamed to Planet Sketch when CITV commissioned the series to broadcast the programme on its channel with Toronto-based animation studio C.O.R.E. Toons providing animation services for the series.

== Episodes ==
The series has been aired in both full-episode and short form. The following information is for the full-length episodes only.

The first 10 episodes were shown on Teletoon in three blocks on 19 November 2005, as part of a special event on the channel called "Nonsense Day".

=== Season 1 (2005) ===
No. overall	No. in season	Title	Directed by	Written by	Original air date (Teletoon)
1	1	"Toothbrush"	Andy Wyatt and Vamberto Maduro	Lee Pressman	19 November 2005
Nose Picker; Mad Dad Scientist; The Gnaughty Gnomes; Rude Limerick Boy; Street Rappers; Dr. Inosaur; Bill and Phil (1); Parping Ponies; Bill and Phil (2); Japanese Fighting Fish; Bill and Phil (3); News Casters; Mad Dad Scientist; Napkin Squirrel; Captain Gagtastic; Rude Limerick Boy; Why the Dinosaurs Died Out; June Spume and Melville
2	2	"Remote"	Nicholas Barber and Jono Howard	Mike Fasolo	19 November 2005
Nose Picker; Ninja Handyman; Why the Dinosaurs Died Out; Captain Gagtastic; Street Rappers; Ira and Lyra (1); Japanese Fighting Fish; Ira and Lyra (2); Parping Ponies; Ira and Lyra (3); Street Rappers; Okay, Coach I'm Ready; News Casters; Okay, Coach I'm Ready; Ninja Handyman; Dr. Inosaur; The Gnaughty Gnomes; Napkin Squirrel: June Spume and Melville
3	3	"Cake"	Dale Schott	Ian Carney	19 November 2005
Nose Picker; Ninja Handyman; Mr. Hives & Timbo; The Gnaughty Gnomes; Rude Limerick Boy; News Casters; Japanese Fighting Fish; Mad Dad Scientist; Swapsy (1); Captain Gagtastic; Swapsy (2); Dr. Inosaur; Swapsy (3); Street Rappers; Rude Limerick Boy; Mr. Hives & Timbo; Napkin Squirrel; Parping Ponies; Why the Dinosaurs Died Out; June Spume and Melville
4	4	"Hamster"	Richard Bazley	Rob Walton	19 November 2005
Nose Picker; The Gnaughty Gnomes; Napkin Squirrel; My Mother the Armchair; Captain Gagtastic; Ira and Lyra (1); Japanese Fighting Fish; Ira and Lyra (2); Why the Dinosaurs Died Out; Ira and Lyra (3); News Casters; Mr. Hives & Timbo; Dr. Inosaur; Street Rappers; Parping Ponies; My Mother the Armchair; Ninja Handyman; June Spume and Melville
5	5	"Magic Wand"	Richard Eliott and Simon Racioppa	Eric Robles	19 November 2005
Nose Picker; Captain Gagtastic; Rude Limerick Boy; Ninja Handyman; The Gnaughty Gnomes; Dr. Inosaur; Street Rappers; Swapsy (1); News Casters; Swapsy (2); Japanese Fighting Fish; Swapsy (3); Mad Dad Scientist; Okay Coach, I'm Ready; Napkin Squirrel; Ninja Handyman; Mr. Hives & Timbo; Why the Dinosaurs Died Out; Okay Coach, I'm Ready; Parping Ponies; June Spume and Melville
6	6	"Broomstick"	Dale Schott	Chris Labonte and Les Solis	19 November 2005
Nose Picker; Mad Dad Scientist; The Gnaughty Gnomes; Rude Limerick Boy; My Mother the Armchair; Captain Gagtastic; Ira and Lyra (1); Japanese Fighting Fish; Ira and Lyra (2); Why the Dinosaurs Died Out; Ira and Lyra (3); News Casters; Dr. Inosaur; Napkin Squirrel; Mr. Hives & Timbo; My Mother the Armchair; Parping Ponies; June Spume and Melville
7	7	"Earphones"	Rob Walton	Steve Beaumont	19 November 2005
Nose Picker; The Gnaughty Gnomes; Ninja Handyman; Dr. Inosaur; Captain Gagtastic; Street Rappers; Only Joking (1); Mr. Hives & Timbo; Only Joking (2); Parping Ponies; Only Joking (3); Napkin Squirrel; Japanese Fighting Fish; Okay Coach, I'm Ready; News Casters; Okay Coach, I'm Ready; Why the Dinosaurs Died Out; Ninja Handyman; June Spume and Melville
8	8	"Tune"	Mike Reagan	Ian Carney	19 November 2005
Nose Picker; Mad Dad Scientist; Japanese Fighting Fish; Street Rappers; Rude Limerick Boy; Captain Gagtastic; Mr. Hives & Timbo; Dr. Inosaur; Rude Limerick Boy; The Gnaughty Gnomes; Swapsy (1); News Casters; Swapsy (2); Napkin Squirrel; Swapsy (3); Mad Dad Scientist; Parping Ponies; Why the Dinosaurs Died Out; June Spume and Melville
9	9	"Phone"	Sergio Delfino	Derek Simpson	19 November 2005
Nose Picker; Ninja Handyman; The Gnaughty Gnomes; Dr. Inosaur; My Mother the Armchair; Why the Dinosaurs Died Out; Only Joking (1); Mr. Hives & Timbo; Only Joking (2); Street Rappers; Only Joking (3); Japanese Fighting Fish; News Casters; Captain Gagtastic; Napkin Squirrel; Parping Ponies; June Spume and Melville
10	10	"Sandwich"	Sean Jara	Derek Seaborn	19 November 2005
Nose Picker; Mad Dad Scientist; The Gnaughty Gnomes; Street Rappers; Dr. Inosaur; Ninja Handyman; Only Joking (1); Napkin Squirrel; Only Joking (2); Japanese Fighting Fish; Only Joking (3); News Casters; Captain Gagtastic; Parping Ponies; Mr. Hives & Timbo; Why the Dinosaurs Died Out; June Spume and Melville
11	11	"Mousetrap"	Richard Eliott and Simon Racioppa	John T. Fisher	3 December 2005
Nose Picker; Captain Gagtastic; The Gnaughty Gnomes; Dr. Inosaur; Street Rappers; Mad Dad Scientist; Rude Limerick Boy; Japanese Fighting Fish; Mr. Hives & Timbo; Talent Show (1); News Casters; Talent Show (2); Napkin Squirrel; Ninja Handyman; Parping Ponies; Why the Dinosaurs Died Out; June Spume and Melville
12	12	"Spaghetti"	Richard Eliott and Simon Racioppa	Romain Van Liemt	26 December 2005
Nose Picker; Ninja Handyman; Rude Limerick Boy; The Gnaughty Gnomes; Captain Gagtastic; Street Rappers; Rude Limerick Boy; Mad Dad Scientist; Dragon Burping Contest (1); News Casters; Dragon Burping Contest (2); Japanese Fighting Fish; Mr. Hives & Timbo; Napkin Squirrel; Why the Dinosaurs Died Out; Street Rappers; Parping Ponies; June Spume and Melville
13	13	"Baby Bottle"	Dale Schott	Chris "Doc" Wyatt	26 December 2005
Nose Picker; Captain Gagtastic; The Gnaughty Gnomes; Mad Dad Scientist; Street Rappers; Japanese Fighting Fish; Napkin Squirrel; Alien Game Show (1); Mr. Hives & Timbo; Alien Game Show (2); News Casters; My Mother the Armchair; Why the Dinosaurs Died Out; Street Rappers; Rude Limerick Boy; Parping Ponies; Ninja Handyman; June Spume and Melville

=== Season 2 (2006–2007) ===
No. overall	No. in season	Title	Directed by	Written by	Original air date (Teletoon)
14	1	"Pepper"	Andy Wyatt and Vamberto Maduro	Eugene Son	24 August 2006
Ninja Handyman; Nose Picker; Japanese Fighting Fish; Mesmo Mutt; Street Rappers; The Useless Starship Computer; Dr. Inosaur; Napkin Squirrel; The Useless Starship Computer; Melville
15	2	"Rubbish/Garbage"	Dale Schott	Mike Fasolo	24 August 2006
Ninja Handyman; Nose Picker; Mesmo Mutt; Why the Dinosaurs Died Out; Dr. Inosaur; News Casters; The Useless Starship Computer; Parping Ponies; Melville
16	3	"Dog Lead"	Dale Schott	Ian Carney	10 September 2006
Nose Picker; Japanese Fighting Fish; Parping Ponies; Street Rappers; Dr. Inosaur; Why the Dinosaurs Died Out; Nose Picker; News Casters; The Useless Starship Computer; Napkin Squirrel; Melville
17	4	"Yoga"	Dale Schott	Richard Bazley	10 September 2006
Parping Ponies; Ninja Handyman; Nose Picker; Street Rappers; Dr. Inosaur; News Casters; Why the Dinosaurs Died Out; Napkin Squirrel; The Useless Starship Computer; Melville
18	5	"Fridge"	Eric Robles	Sean Jara	17 October 2006
Ninja Handyman; Nose Picker; Dr. Inosaur; News Casters; Street Rappers; The Useless Starship Computer; Parping Ponies; Why the Dinosaurs Died Out; Napkin Squirrel; Melville
19	6	"Floor Work"	Unknown	Unknown	17 October 2006
Ninja Handyman; Napkin Squirrel; Mesmo Mutt; The Useless Starship Computer; Why the Dinosaurs Died Out; Street Rappers (intro only); Parping Ponies; Dr. Inosaur; Melville
20	7	"Mouse"	Unknown	Unknown	28 December 2006
Super Ninja Handyman; Mesmo Mutt; Japanese Fighting Fish; Why the Dinosaurs Died Out; The Useless Starship Computer; Dr. Inosaur; Parping Ponies; Napkin Squirrel; Melville
21	8	"Samurai Rubbish"	Unknown	Unknown	28 December 2006
Ninja Handyman; Japanese Fighting Fish; Nose Picker; The Useless Starship Computer; Street Rappers; Parping Ponies; News Casters; Dr. Inosaur; Napkin Squirrel; Dr. Inosaur; Melville
22	9	"Kitchen Sink"	Unknown	Unknown	16 January 2007
Ninja Handyman; Nose Picker; Why the Dinosaurs Died Out (1); Mesmo Mutt; Street Rappers; Nose Picker; Why the Dinosaurs Died Out (2); The Useless Starship Computer; Dr. Inosaur; Why the Dinosaurs Died Out; Napkin Squirrel; Melville
23	10	"Light Switch"	Unknown	Unknown	16 January 2007
Ninja Handyman; Mesmo Mutt; Why the Dinosaurs Died Out; Parping Ponies; The Useless Starship Computer; Japanese Fighting Fish (1); Japanese Fighting Fish (2); News Casters; Dr. Inosaur; Napkin Squirrel; Melville
24	11	"Wrinkly Shirt"	Unknown	Unknown	27 December 2006
Ninja Handyman; Japanese Fighting Fish; Nose Picker; News Casters; Dr. Inosaur; The Useless Starship Computer; Why the Dinosaurs Died Out; Parping Ponies; Melville
25	12	"Mama Mia"	Unknown	Unknown	27 December 2006
Ninja Handyman; Japanese Fighting Fish; News Casters; Street Rappers; Japanese Fighting Fish; Mesmo Mutt; Why the Dinosaurs Died Out; The Useless Starship Computer; Napkin Squirrel; Parping Ponies; Melville
26	13	"Pogo"	Unknown	Unknown	21 September 2007
Nose Picker; Ninja Handyman; Japanese Fighting Fish; Napkin Squirrel; Why the Dinosaurs Died Out; Parping Ponies; The Useless Starship Computer; Nose Picker (1); Dr. Inosaur; Nose Picker (2); The Useless Starship Computer; Napkin Squirrel; Melville
27	14	"Tennis"	Unknown	Unknown	30 September 2007
Nose Picker; Ninja Handyman; Mesmo Mutt; Why the Dinosaurs Died Out; Street Rappers; Napkin Squirrel; Dr. Inosaur; Parping Ponies; The Useless Starship Computer; Why the Dinosaurs Died Out; Parping Ponies; Melville
28	15	"To Tell The Tooth"	Unknown	Unknown	8 October 2007
Ninja Handyman; Nose Picker; Japanese Fighting Fish; Mesmo Mutt; Street Rappers; Napkin Squirrel; Why the Dinosaurs Died Out; Dr. Inosaur; The Useless Starship Computer; Parping Ponies; Melville
29	16	"Drums"	Unknown	Unknown	14 October 2007
Nose Picker; Japanese Fighting Fish; News Casters; Street Rappers; Why the Dinosaurs Died Out; Dr. Inosaur; The Useless Starship Computer; Parping Ponies; Napkin Squirrel; The Useless Starship Computer; Melville
30	17	"Let Them Eat Cake"	Unknown	Unknown	24 October 2007
Ninja Handyman; Nose Picker; Why the Dinosaurs Died Out; The Useless Starship Computer; News Casters; Street Rappers; Napkin Squirrel; Parping Ponies; Dr. Inosaur; Why the Dinosaurs Died Out; The Useless Starship Computer; Melville
31	18	"Locksmith"	Unknown	Unknown	30 October 2007
Ninja Handyman; Nose Picker; Why the Dinosaurs Died Out; The Useless Starship Computer; Mesmo Mutt; Street Rappers; Napkin Squirrel; Dr. Inosaur; Parping Ponies; The Useless Starship Computer; Melville
32	19	"Shoe"	Unknown	Unknown	8 November 2007
Nose Picker; Ninja Handyman; Mesmo Mutt; Why the Dinosaurs Died Out; Street Rappers; Napkin Squirrel; Dr. Inosaur; Parping Ponies; The Useless Starship Computer; Why the Dinosaurs Died Out; Parping Ponies; Melville
33	20	"Gerbil"	Unknown	Unknown	18 November 2007
Ninja Handyman; Nose Picker; Why the Dinosaurs Died Out; Japanese Fighting Fish; Dr. Inosaur; Why the Dinosaurs Died Out (alternate version); Street Rappers; Napkin Squirrel; Dr. Inosaur; Parping Ponies; The Useless Starship Computer; Melville
34	21	"Lost"	Unknown	Unknown	24 November 2007
Ninja Handyman; Nose Picker; News Casters; Mesmo Mutt; The Useless Starship Computer; Street Rappers; Napkin Squirrel; Parping Ponies (1) Why the Dinosaurs Died Out; Parping Ponies; Dr. Inosaur; Melville
35	22	"Practicing"	Unknown	Unknown	2 December 2007
Nose Picker; Ninja Handyman; Why the Dinosaurs Died Out; Napkin Squirrel; The Useless Starship Computer; Japanese Fighting Fish; Street Rappers; Why the Dinosaurs Died Out; Dr. Inosaur; Parping Ponies; The Useless Starship Computer; Melville
36	23	"Cowgirl"	Unknown	Unknown	8 December 2007
Nose Picker Girl; Ninja Handyman; Dr. Inosaur; The Useless Starship Computer; Street Rappers; Napkin Squirrel; Why the Dinosaurs Died Out; Japanese Fighting Fish; Parping Ponies; The Useless Starship Computer; Melville
37	24	"Feeding Kitty"	Unknown	Unknown	15 December 2007
Ninja Handyman; News Casters; Japanese Fighting Fish; The Useless Starship Computer; Why the Dinosaurs Died Out; Napkin Squirrel; Mesmo Mutt; Japanese Fighting Fish; Parping Ponies; The Useless Starship Computer; Dr. Inosaur; Melville
38	25	"Washing Up"	Unknown	Unknown	21 December 2007
Ninja Handyman; Nose Picker; Why the Dinosaurs Died Out; Mesmo Mutt; The Useless Starship Computer; Street Rappers; Why the Dinosaurs Died Out; Dr. Inosaur; The Useless Starship Computer; Parping Ponies; Melville
39	26	"Hide and Seek"	Unknown	Unknown	30 December 2007
Nose Picker; Ninja Handyman; News Casters; Street Rappers; The Useless Starship Computer; Japanese Fighting Fish; Why the Dinosaurs Died Out; Nose Picker; Dr. Inosaur; Parping Ponies; Napkin Squirrel; The Useless Starship Computer; Melville
