= Richard Bazley =

British animator

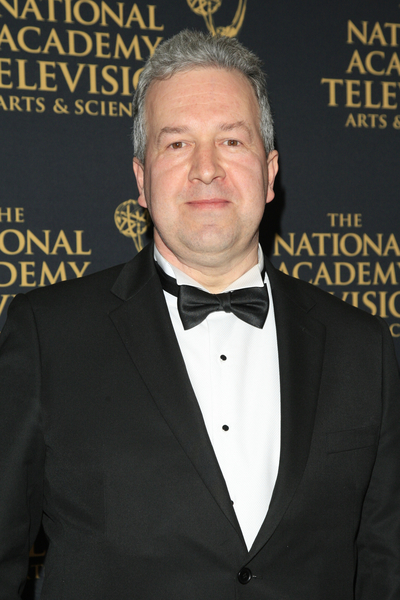
Director Richard Bazley.

Richard Bazley (born 28 November 1962 in Devon, England) is an Emmy-nominated film director and a storyboard artist. Although now a Director of Live Action and animation his background is in animation and his credits include Disney's Pocahontas, Hercules, Tarzan and a lead animator and sequence director on the Warner Bros. film The Iron Giant. Bazley started his career on Who Framed Roger Rabbit.

== Work ==
Bazley who works on both sides of the Atlantic set up Bazley Films in the US and UK and produced the animated short The Journal of Edwin Carp narrated by Hugh Laurie (House). It was the first animated short created in Flash to be released theatrically. Bazley also cowrote flash cartoons and games with James Robertson and Bill Turner.

Bazley moved into directing on commercials and series with popular commercials for Sky and Go Compare. In 2012 he Directed two Episodes of Full English at Rough Draft Studios (USA), a TV show made for the UK's Channel Four (2012). On this Bazley teamed up with Alex Scarfe, the son of Gerald Scarfe with whom he had worked closely on Disney's Hercules.

Through Argosy Film Group Bazley directed the Lost Treasure Hunt, an animated half-hour pilot for a proposed TV series. Lost Treasure Hunt was created by the animators behind Shrek, The Iron Giant, and Frozen.

Bazley developed several feature films and is attached as director. In 2011 Bazley teamed up with Gary Kurtz (prod. Star Wars, The Dark Crystal) and Paul Goodenough to set up the film production company, based in London and Los Angeles. GBK Hybrid's first short Centurion Resurrection filmed in Bath has played at numerous film festivals and won numerous awards.

The Chimeran, a live action/animation hybrid is the first film in development. Described as somewhere between Planet of the Apes and District 9 this is clearly not just another creature movie. With Gary Kurtz's involvement it ensures that the film has depth and character with many sociological issues that take it out of the realms of regular science fiction.

In 2022 Bazley directed the multi-award-winning film Censure featuring Tom Conti. To date the film has won over 40 awards.

Richard's grandfather, George Bazley, was a famous Cornish wrestler in the 1920s.

== Filmography ==
Year	Film title	Credited with	Comments
1988	Who Framed Roger Rabbit	Inbetweener	
1995	Pocahontas	Animator	
1997	Hercules	Lead Animator	
1999	The Iron Giant	Lead Animator	
2000	The Journal of Edwin Carp	Producer, director	Featured in the Flash 5 Bible
2001	Osmosis Jones	Supervising Animator	CGI, Drix Voiced By David Hyde Pierce
2004	Harry Potter and the Prisoner of Azkaban	Animator	
2005	The Lion, the Witch and the Wardrobe	Animator (Uncredited)	
2006	Barnyard	Supervising Animator	

== TV commercials ==
Year	Title	Credited with
2007	Sky's Carbon Neutral Film	Director
2012	Go Compare's Big bad Wolf	Director

== TV shows ==
Year	Title	Credited with	Comments
2012	Full English	Director	Working title 'Happy Families' – 2 episodes
2014	Lost Treasure Hunt	Director	Half hour animated pilot

== Short films ==
Year	Title	Credited with	Comments
2014	Centurion Resurrection	Director	Live action short film
2022	Censure	Director	Live action short film
2023	Confines	Director	Live Action Short

== Bibliography ==
Year	Book title	Credited with
2000	Flash-Cartoons and Games	Co-Author
2001	Flash 5 Cartoons and Games f/x and Design	Co-Author
2002	Flash X Cartoons f/x and Design	Co-Author
2006	Macromedia Flash 8 Bible	Contributor
