= Max Avery Lichtenstein =

Max Avery Lichtenstein is an American record producer, composer and songwriter based in North Salem, New York. He's produced records with such artists as Mercury Rev, Hopewell and The Silent League. He composed the soundtrack for Jonathan Caouette's movie Tarnation and for the 2005 James Bai film Puzzlehead.

== Works ==
Films
Year	Title	Role	Co-worker
2009	Loot	Composition	
2012	Mighty Fine	Composition	
2013	Mondays at Racine	Composition	
2013	Code of the West	Composition	
TV shows
Year	Title	Role	Co-worker
