= Perl Wolfe =

American Hasidic singer and songwriter (born 1986)

- Born: Perl Wolfe; Chicago, Illinois
- Origin: Brooklyn, New York
- Genres: Jewish rock, alternative rock
- Occupations: Singer, songwriter
- Instruments: Vocals, piano
- Years active: 2011–present
- Member of: PERL
- Formerly of: Bulletproof Stockings
- Website: perlmusic.com

Perl Wolfe is an American Hasidic singer and songwriter. She is best known as the lead vocalist and keyboardist of the now-defunct alternative rock band Bulletproof Stockings, which received media attention for performing at several major music venues for all-female audiences, in accordance with kol isha. In 2015, she was included in The Jewish Week's "36 Under 36", an annual list of influential Jews under age 36. She currently leads the band PERL.

== Early life ==
Wolfe grew up in Chicago, Illinois in a Chabad family. Her parents are baalei teshuva; her father was a Jewish atheist and her mother was raised Catholic before they respectively. She studied classical piano from the age of six. Wolfe's parents, having not been raised Orthodox, exposed her to secular rock artists like The Beatles, Jimi Hendrix, and The Rolling Stones. Her father, a jazz pianist, introduced her to Ella Fitzgerald, Louis Armstrong, and Etta James. Growing up, she listened to classical music, oldies and classic rock radio, R&B and hip hop, and alternative rock and punk bands like Red Hot Chili Peppers, No Doubt, and Green Day.

She attended a religious high school, where she often got in trouble for "rebellious" behavior such as wearing heavy eye liner. She studied psychology at Northwestern University.

== Career ==
=== Bulletproof Stockings ===
In 2011, Wolfe was introduced through a mutual friend to drummer Dalia Shusterman, who had played for the band Hopewell before becoming religious. Bonding over music, they formed Bulletproof Stockings in December of that year. They released the EP Down to the Top in 2012 and subsequently added violinist Dana Pestun and cellist Elisheva Maister, the latter of whom Wolfe had known since 2009, to their lineup. Wolfe was also featured in the 2013 Canadian documentary Shekinah Rising. The band received considerable media attention for their uniqueness as an all-female Hasidic rock band, as well as a 2014 women-only concert at Arlene's Grocery that was filmed for the Oxygen miniseries Living Different. In April 2016, the band announced via Facebook that they were splitting up to pursue other projects, cancelling a planned debut album called Homeland Call Stomp.

=== PERL ===
In the summer of 2016, Wolfe announced a new band called PERL, featuring fellow Bulletproof Stockings members Dana Pestun and Elisheva Maister. They debuted with a July 14 concert on the roof of the Jewish Community Center in Manhattan. Wolfe said of the new material, "I’m finding more of my voice and I’m a lot more pulled back, and vulnerable. The songs have less drama, more honesty. It’s been really exciting working on new stuff. Since we’re starting with piano, violin, and cello, there’s a lot of room for layering and harmonizing. We’re also playing with loop pedals and drum machine, as well as working on incorporating other instruments like guitar, saxophone, and trumpet. We’re having a lot of fun with it."

In 2017, Wolfe performed an acoustic piano version of a new song, "Say It Again", as an exclusive for the website Hevria. The following year, PERL contributed the song "Piha Pascha" to the soundtrack of the documentary 93Queen. In 2020, they released three singles - "Say It Again", "It's A Party!", and "Everything Was Flowers" - followed by a full-length debut album, Late Bloomer.

In 2022, Perl released a new single, "Can't Believe", featuring producer Stanny Suavvv.

== Discography ==
=== As PERL ===
==== Albums ====
- Late Bloomer (2020)

==== Singles ====
- 2018: "Piha Pascha" (from the 93Queen soundtrack)
- 2020: "Everything Was Flowers" (Late Bloomer)
- 2020: "It's A Party!" (Late Bloomer)
- 2020: "Say It Again" (Late Bloomer)

=== With Bulletproof Stockings ===
- Down to the Top EP (2012)
- Homeland Call Stop (2016)
