= Bill Whitten =

American songwriter and musician

- Origin: Windsor Locks, Connecticut, United States
- Genres: Alternative rock
- Occupations: Singer, songwriter, musician
- Instruments: Guitar, keyboard, vocals, whistling
- Years active: 1989–present
- Labels: Ajax Records (Chicago), Rough Trade Records, Caroline Records, DGC Records, No.6 Records, Slash/London Records, Arena Rock Recording Co.
- Member of: Grand Mal, St. Johnny

Bill Whitten is an American musician and writer. He was the founding member, principal songwriter and singer/guitarist for St. Johnny He was also the singer/songwriter/guitarist for Grand Mal.

In 2018 he released "Burn My Letters", his first solo album, via I Heart Noise.

St. Johnny formed in 1989 in Hartford, Connecticut and made three full-length albums, two for DGC Records, before disbanding in 1995. Rolling Stone described St. Johnny as "a Connecticut band that likes their music loud and hard, are intent on a punk-edged sound that has more in common with the Ramones or Sonic Youth than with the latest Sub Pop release. In addition, St. Johnny possess a flair for songcraft, hooks and…hummable melodies".

Grand Mal was formed in New York City in 1995 and has recorded for No.6 Records, Slash/London Records, Arena Rock Recording Co., New York Night Train and Groover Recordings. According to the New York Times: "Grand Mal mixes three parts Rolling Stones, one part Velvet Underground … rock with an unabashed swagger."

He has worked regularly with producer Dave Fridmann and has collaborated on recordings with members of Mercury Rev, Joan as Police Woman, The Flaming Lips, Antony and the Johnsons, Favourite Sons, Home, Shady, The Silent League, Hopewell, The Jealous Girlfriends, The Mooney Suzuki, VietNam, Mike Bones and others.

== Discography ==
=== St. Johnny Discography ===
Singles

- “Go To Sleep” (7″) (Ajax Records) 1992
- “A Car or A Boy” (7″) (Geffen) 1993
- “Gilligan/Live at the Sports Page Cafe…” (7″) (Twisted Village) 1994
- “I Give Up/One Of The Boys” (7″) (Love Kit) 1994
- “Scuba Diving/Welcome Back Kotter” (7″) (Geffen)

EPS

- Four Songs (EP7) (Asthma) 1992
- Go to Sleep (EP7) (Ajax) 1992
- Early Live Recordings (Twisted Village) 1994

Full-Length

- High as a Kite (Rough Trade [UK]/Caroline [US]) 1993
- Speed Is Dreaming (DGC) 1994
- Let It Come Down (DGC) 1995

Tracks Appear On:

- “Ashes and Slashes” My Companion Turn of the Century (LP) 1990
- “Wild Goose Chasing” DGC Rarities: Vol.1 (CD) (Geffen Records) 1994
- “Scuba Diving” Buy-Product (CD, Comp) (Geffen Records) 1995
- “Scuba Diving” CMJ New Music April – Volume 20 (CD, Promo) (College Music Journal) 1995
- Incredible Son of Swag (CD) (Geffen/DGC) 1995

=== Grand Mal Discography ===
EP’s

- Grand Mal (No. 6) 1996

Full-Length

- Pleasure Is No Fun (CD/LP) (No. 6) 1997
- Maledictions (CD) (Slash/London) 1999
- Bad Timing (CD) (Arena Rock) 2003
- Love Is The Best Con in Town (New York Night Train) 2006
- Congratulations You’ve Re-joined the Human Race (Groover Recordings) 2007
- Clandestine Songs (Groover Recordings) TBR April 7, 2010

Tracks Appear On:

- “Stay in Bed” Jawbreaker (film): Music from the Motion Picture (London) 1999
- "Hey Man" This is Next Year: A Brooklyn-Based Compilation (Arena Rock) 2001
- Jean and Cover: A Compilation (Groover Recordings) 2005
- The World Turns all Around Him: A Compilation (Groover Recordings) 2006
- 50 Minutes: A Compilation (Exercise1 Recordings) 2006
