= Common Prayer (band) =

American indie rock band

- Origin: Brooklyn, New York
- Genres: Indie rock Americana
- Years active: 2010–present
- Label: Big Potato Records
- Members: Jason Sebastian Russo; Tara Autovino; Danny Lockwood; Sara Press
- Past members: Justin Russo; Joe Bennett; Robin Bennett; Mike Monaghan; Alexandra Marvar; Karen Codd; John Anderson
- Website: www.common-prayer.com

Common Prayer are an American, Brooklyn-based indie rock band, led by Jason Sebastian Russo. They released their debut full-length album, "There Is A Mountain," in 2010 on England's Big Potato Records (founded by Neil Halstead) in the UK, and on Russo's own South Cherry Entropy imprint of Virtual Label digitally in North America.

"There Is A Mountain" was recorded in a cow barn at Hill Farm in Steventon, Oxfordshire, at the site of the Truck Festival, with significant musical contributions from Joe and Robin Bennett of Goldrush. Other players include Alexandra Marvar, as well as Justin Russo of The Silent League. The record was well received in the UK; the BBC called it "one of the year-so-far’s most recommended under-the-radar releases."

In October 2013, Common Prayer released their second LP "Frame The River" with the help of the O+Festival. The album began in Neil Halstead's Cornwall studio while the band was on tour in support of "There Is A Mountain," and was completed in Brooklyn, NY nearly 2 years later. It was produced by Damon Whittemore and Jeff Mercel at Valvetone Studios.

== Discography ==
Year	Title	Label
2010	There Is A Mountain	Big Potato Records (UK), South Cherry Entropy (US)
2013	Frame The River	O+ (Vinyl), South Cherry Entropy (Digital)
