= Philippe Vartan Khazarian =

French-Armenian film director, screenwriter and producer (born 1965)

Philippe Vartan Khazarian (born March 1, 1965) was a French-Armenian film director, screenwriter and producer. He was known for directing I Love the Sound of the Kalachnikov It Reminds Me of Tchaikovsky (2001) and Picnic in Gaza (2016).

== Early years ==
Born in Villeurbanne-Lyon, France, in 1965, Khazarian is a French film-maker of Armenian descent. His parents, first generation Armenians born in France, met in Lyon and married. Fascinated by Bertolt Brecht, Khazarian directed his first play: “Fear and Misery of the Third Reich” at 16, performing at the Lycée National du Parc in Lyon; and in doing so he was very first of his generation to receive funding from this secular French institution in over twenty years. Khazarian left high school a year earlier to study in the United States, combining theatre, art and languages in Norway High School Community, Iowa.

== Education ==
During his first three graduate years of studying in both France and Spain - in Seville at facultad de ciencas economicas y empressariales -, Khazarian combined art and languages. Gaining academic recognition both inland and abroad, he entered a top- ranking higher education establishment - Grande Ecole: School of Higher Studies in Information and Communication Sciences at the Pantheon – CELSA - at the Sorbonne, and graduated two years later receiving Summa cum Laude (first class honours) for his postgraduate work at 25.

== Breaking into documentaries ==
Despite his desire that his son should pursue a career in international corporate media consulting, his evangelist father introduced him to an Armenian shelter foundation, in the hopes of helping Khazarian junior to become a director. Soon commissioned by a French NGO, ‘S.E.L’, he directed and produced his first documentary series and promotional video, introduced by Jean-Marc Barr, for the Armenian orphans of post-earthquake survival of 1989.

== First feature project ==
The following year, Khazarian was commissioned by the Bullukian Foundation to accompany a humanitarian initiative to the war zone of Nagorno-Karabakh. Although commissioned as a war correspondent, Khazarian obtained additional funding to produce the first part of a feature film, shot in Super 16, which six years later became his first feature achievement: I Love the Sound of the Kalachnikov It Reminds Me of Tchaikovsky. Upon returning from the region, Khazarian's perception of investigative journalism began to shift. Until 1997, Khazarian combined personal visual archive research and experimental filmmaking alongside, the distribution and promotion of Point du Jour press agency documentary catalogue. Becoming more fascinated by 80's and 90's English filmmakers – Frears, Scott, Greenaway, Loach, Ivory, Gillian, Leigh, Boyle, Winterbottom... - he soon chose to continue his work in London where he completes his film in 1999. Between 1998 and 2002, Khazarian first worked as media consultant for The New York Times’ TV and film office, then following his boss, nomination in New York, he was appointed International Director of the New York Times TV and Film until September 11, when he resigned his position and decided to become independent.

== The world stage ==
Beginning in 2003, Khazarian created PVK-Pictures, a fully self-funded independent film production company, and dedicated himself to developing new projects and filming techniques, spending four years experimenting. The resulting scripts, video installations, short films, performances and production efforts inexorably lead to his writing, producing and directing the feature Picnic in Gaza (2013). A Film spanning three continents, across nine countries, it marks a bridge between his art-house roots and experimental fiction, with a tale of four westerners embarking unknowingly on a course to oblivion.

== Nominations ==
His first film, I Love the Sound of the Kalachnikov It Reminds Me of Tchaikovsky, was selected in the 2001 Rotterdam Film Festival. and was soon nominated in 19 international film festivals, receiving 4 international awards, 12 international selections and 6 international competitions including :

- Festival Centre Piece, MIX NYC, NYC Lesbian and Gay Experimental Film Festival 2003
- Special Mention of the Jury, Toronto Image Film Festival 2003 where it was personally introduced by Canadian director Atom Egoyan
- Opening Night Film, East/West International Film Festival 2001
- International Competition Nominee, Sunnyside of the doc 2001
- Official Selection, San Francisco Armenian Film Festival 2006
- Official Selection, Lisboa International Documentary Film Festival 2002
- International Selection, Lisboa ‘In the closet’ Film Festival 2004
- Representing Contemporary British Cinema, Febio Fest Prague International Film Festival 2004
- Special Mention of the Jury, Dei Popoli Film Festival 2002
- Guardian Award First Film Competition Nominee, Edinburgh Film Festival 2001
- International Selection, Tursak International Selection 2002
- International Selection, Haifa International Film Festival 2001
- International Selection, Beirut International Film Festival 2002
- International Selection, Mostra Internazionale del Nuovo Cinema 2001
- International Selection Finalist London Lesbian&Gay Film Festival
- International selection, Lisboa L&G International Film Festival 2003

The film remained self-sustaining on the festival circuit for over six years thereafter till 2006.

== Filmography ==
- Picnic in Gaza - 88 ' fiction - 2016
- Deviation – 15 ‘ fiction – 2009
- Vive la Mariée – 3’ installation – 2005
- Kennedy didn't die in Dallas – 45’ x 2 installation – 2003
- I Love The Sound of The Kalashnikov, It Reminds Me of Tchaikovsky – 80’ – 2001
- The Last Phoenix – 21’ series – 1999
- Tomorrow, Another Day - 3’ Clip – 1993
