= Frilot =

Frilot is a surname, a variant spelling of Friloux. Notable people with the name include:

- Maurice Frilot (1940–2021), American boxer
- Shari Frilot (born 1965), American film director
