= Dalia Shusterman =

Canadian-American musician

- Born: Dalia Garih Shusterman; Montreal, Quebec, Canada
- Origin: Crown Heights, New York
- Genres: Alternative rock
- Occupation: Drummer
- Instruments: Drums, vocals
- Labels: Priapus, Burnt Hair

Dalia Garih Shusterman is a Canadian-American musician, best known as the drummer and backing vocalist for the bands Hopewell, Bulletproof Stockings, and the New Moon All Stars Party Band.

== Biography ==
=== Early life ===
Dalia Shusterman was born in Montreal, Quebec, Canada to a French Modern Orthodox Jewish family. She grew up in Potomac, Maryland. She played piano as a child, but discovered her talent for drums at an Earth First New Year's Eve party when she was 16, after playing the hired band's hand drums while they were on break and getting a positive response from the people in attendance. Inspired by this, she soon started busking in Washington, and then after hitchhiking across the country, in New Orleans. The street playing there got her access to several local stages, Mardi Gras parades, and even onstage at the New Orleans Jazz Festival.

Shusterman briefly attended the State University of New York at Purchase, where she studied philosophy and literature. While still an undergraduate, a friend convinced her to play a full-on drum kit in the opening act for the band Boss Hog.

=== Hopewell ===
In 1993, Shusterman and bassist Jason "Whip" Merrit joined brothers Jason and Justin Russo of Mercury Rev to form the psychedelic rock band Hopewell. The group recorded a series of 7" singles before releasing their 1998 debut album Contact on Burnt Hair Records. The record was promoted by a small string of shows until the band went on hiatus, during which time the Russos toured with Mercury Rev and Merrit recorded a solo album, Song Song.

The band regrouped in 1999 to record their second album, The Curved Glass, which was released in October 2000 by Priapus Records. The album received critical acclaim and was promoted by a performance at the English Reading and Leeds Festivals, as well as an extensive European tour.

=== Return to Judaism and retirement ===
In September 2001, Shusterman, while in Manhattan, received a flyer for a Sukkot event in the Crown Heights neighborhood of Brooklyn and decided to attend. Her experience there motivated her to join Chabad, marry a young Hasidic rabbi she had met at the event, and quit Hopewell. She subsequently moved with her new husband to Los Angeles, where their four sons were born.

=== Bulletproof Stockings ===
After her husband's death in the spring of 2011, Shusterman and her children moved back to New York. There, a friend introduced her to Perl Wolfe, a singer-songwriter and fellow Lubavitcher, and the two formed the all-female Hasidic alternative rock group Bulletproof Stockings in December of that year. The group released their debut EP, Down to the Top, on April 1, 2012. The quartet Bulletproof Stockings (Wolfe, Shusterman, Elisheva Maister, and Dana Pestun) toured throughout New York and Los Angeles with plans to expand their lineup and release a full-length album.

On April 8, 2016, Shusterman announced that Bulletproof Stockings had disbanded and that the four band members were heading off to individual music pursuits.

=== New Moon All Stars Party Band ===
In 2017, Shusterman and former Bulletproof Stockings bandmate Dana Pestun debuted a new Hasidic all-female jazz/klezmer/cabaret group, The New Moon All Stars Party Band.

== Discography ==
=== With Hopewell ===
- Contact (1998, Burnt Hair)
- The Curved Glass (2000, Priapus)

=== With Bulletproof Stockings ===
- Down to the Top EP (2012)
- Homeland Call Stomp (2015)
