= All Tomorrow's Parties (2009 film) =

2009 documentary film

- Directed by: Jonathan Caouette
- Produced by: Luke Morris
- Cinematography: Vincent Moon, Jason Banker, Marc Swadel
- Edited by: Nick Fenton
- Production company: Warp X
- Distributed by: Warp Films
- Release date: 14 March 2009 (SXSW)
- Running time: 82 minutes
- Country: United Kingdom
- Language: English

All Tomorrow's Parties is a 2009 documentary film directed by All Tomorrow's People and Jonathan Caouette covering the history of the long running All Tomorrow's Parties music festival. Described as a "post-punk DIY bricolage", the film was created using footage generated by the fans and musicians attending the events themselves, on a multitude of formats including Super8, camcorder and mobile phone. All Tomorrow's People is a name representing the contributions of these attendees.

The film features music and performances from Belle And Sebastian, Grizzly Bear, Sonic Youth, Battles, Boards of Canada, Portishead, Daniel Johnston, Grinderman, Lightning Bolt, David Cross, Animal Collective, The Boredoms, Les Savy Fav, Mogwai, Octopus Project, Slint, Dirty Three, Yeah Yeah Yeahs, the Gossip, GZA, Roscoe Mitchell, Seasick Steve, Iggy and the Stooges, A Hawk and a Hacksaw, Fuck Buttons, Micah P Hinson, Two Gallants, The Mars Volta, Akron/Family, Jah Shaka, Saul Williams, Shellac, Patti Smith and John Cooper Clarke.

== Release ==
The film debuted at SXSW 2009 and has gone on to play at a number of other film festivals and other screenings. The UK premiere took place at the Edinburgh Picturehouse in June as part of a unique live cinema event at the Edinburgh International Film Festival. The film was screened and brought to life in an immersive and 360 degree musical experience including a full live performance from Mogwai. The film was also screened at Sheffield Doc/Fest in November 2009.

It was announced that in October 2009 the film would be screened at a number of 'one night only' theatrical screenings in the UK, also featuring live music, with the main act performing to be Les Savy Fav, who feature in the film and have long been mainstays of ATP line-ups.

In November/December 2009 the film was released in the US. The film screened in, amongst other cinemas, The IFC center (New York), Alamo Drafthouse (Austin), Cinefamily (L.A).

In June 2011, the film was released theatrically in Australia by Warp Films. It is currently on release in Adelaide, Sydney, Melbourne, and Brisbane. This is due to be followed by the Australian DVD release on 22 July 2011.

== Reception ==
Reviews have been positive, with LA Weekly making it their Critics Pick and calling it "Part concert film, part rebel manifesto ... [it] pleasurably embodies the interactive generosity of talents whose confluence it describes." Drew McWeeney (Moriarty) of Hitfix.com wrote that it was "A cascade of sound and fury ... the range of what this movie covers exhausts me ... The highest compliment I can pay the film is that it made me want to attend the festival for real ... not just your average concert film, [it's] in a class by itself ... One of the singular film experiences i’ve had so far this year."
