= Jason Sebastian Russo =

American rock musician (born 1973)

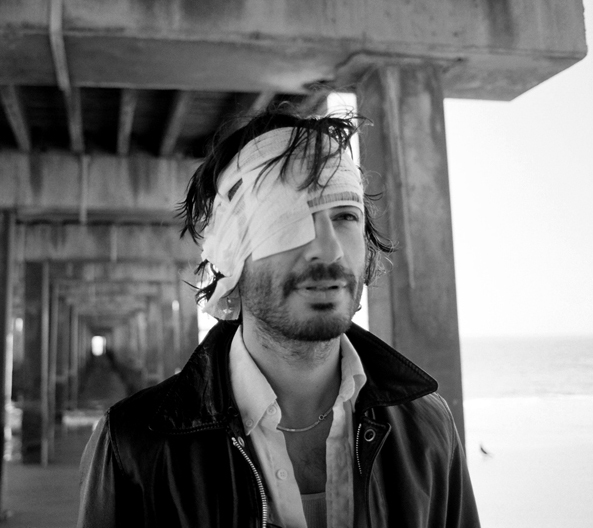
- Jason Sebastian Russo at Coney Island, Brooklyn, New York, during the video shoot for Hopewell's "Island", directed by Art Boonparn.
- Born: August 16, 1973 (age 52)
- Occupation: Musician

Jason Sebastian Russo (born August 16, 1973, in Yonkers, New York) is an American rock musician and writer, currently a MFA student at Bennington Writing Seminars in Bennington, Vermont and a published poet and short story writer. He was a member of Mercury Rev from 1994 to 2001, and rejoined in 2011 for the Don't Look Back concert series Deserter's Songs reunion tour. He founded the psychedelic rock band Hopewell in high school. Hopewell has since gone on hiatus. They released their fifth album, Good Good Desperation, on Tee Pee Records in 2009. He is also leader of the band Common Prayer.

Common Prayer's debut record There Is A Mountain was released in the UK by Big Potato Records, a label founded in part by Slowdive's Neil Halstead. It was recorded on the site of the Truck Festival in Steventon, Oxfordshire, by Joe and Robin Bennett of Goldrush. Other players include Russo's brother, Justin Russo.

In 2014, he began a new band called Guiding Light with the musician/filmmaker Tara Autovino. Their debut LP was released by Bleeding Gold Records (US) and Eggs In Aspic Records (UK) in late 2017.

In 2018, while simultaneously recording their sophomore album, Guiding Light became one half of the band Pete International Airport, recording and touring the album Safer With The Wolves... (A Recordings). They also contributed, separately, remixes for the band's remix LP SFR WTH TH WLVS...RMX.

== Childhood ==
"Jason Russo grew up in a religious household with two brothers, a sister and no TV. The son of a psychiatrist, he spent the better part of his youth in graveyards, woods and strip malls in upstate New York before music consumed much of his life. At the age of 19, Russo found himself touring alongside his brother Justin as bassist for critically acclaimed Mercury Rev during the band's peak, before moving on to focus entirely on his own eclectic psychedelic rock band Hopewell. - NY Post".

== Discography ==
=== Albums ===
- Harmony Rockets Paralyzed Mind of the Archangel Void (Big Cat, 1995)
- Hopewell Contact (Burnt Hair Records, 1997)
- Grasshopper and the Golden Crickets The Orbit of Eternal Grace (Beggars Banquet, 1998)
- Mercury Rev All is Dream (V2 Records, 2001)
- Hopewell The Curved Glass (Priapus, PIAS, 2001)
- Grand Mal Bad Timing (Arena Rock Recording Company, 2003)
- The Silent League The Orchestra, Sadly, Has Refused (File-13, Something in Construction, 2004)
- Hopewell Hopewell & The Birds Of Appetite (Tee Pee Records, Star Mole Records (Japan), 2005)
- Hopewell Hopewell and the Birds of Appetite (TeePee Records, 2005)
- Mercury Rev The Essential Mercury Rev: Stillness Breathes 1991-2006 (V2 Records, 2006)
- Grand Mal Love Is The Best Con In Town (New York Night Train, 2006)
- Hopewell Beautiful Targets (TeePee Records / Star Mole (Japan), 2007)
- Grand Mal Congratulations You've Re-joined the Human Race ( Groover Recordings, 2007)
- The Silent League Of Stars and Other Somebodies (Something in Construction, Rallye/Klee, 2007)
- Camphor Drawn To Dust (Friendly Fire Recordings, 2008)
- Hopewell Good Good Desperation (TeePee Records, 2009)
- Grand Mal Clandestine Songs (Groover Recordings, 2010)
- Common Prayer There Is A Mountain (Big Potato Records / South Cherry Entropy, 2010)
- Hopewell Live Volume 1 (Virtual Label / South Cherry Entropy, 2010)
- Common Prayer Frame The River (O+ / South Cherry Entropy, 2013)
- Kevin Devine Instigator (Procrastinate! Music Traitors, 2016)
- Pete International Airport Safer With The Wolves... (A Recordings, 2017)
- Guiding Light Guide the Lightning (Eggs in Aspic / Bleeding Gold, 2017)
- Pete International Airport SFR WTH TH WLVS...RMX (Little Cloud Records, 2019)

=== Soundtracks ===
- Jesus' Son Soundtrack (1999)
- Tarnation Soundtrack (as Hopewell) (2003)
- Alphonso Bow Soundtrack (2009)
- Psycho Guru Soundtrack (2010)
- Lapse: Confessions of a Slot Machine Junkie Soundtrack (2013)
- River Of Bears Soundtrack (2013)

=== EPs and singles ===
- Hopewell "Windy & Carl" / "Hopewell" (Burnt Hair Records, 1996 7" Single)
- Hopewell "Stranger" (Priapus Records, 1997 7" Single)
- Hopewell "Purple Balloon" (Priapus Records, 1998 EP)
- Mercury Rev "Goddess on a Hiway" (V2 Records, 1998 Single)
- Mercury Rev "Delta Sun Bottleneck Stomp" (V2 Records, 1998 Single)
- Mercury Rev "Opus 40" (V2 Records, 1999 Single)
- Mercury Rev "Holes" (V2 Records, 1999 Single)
- Hopewell "Planetarium" / "Hopewell" (Burnt Hair Records, 1998 12" S/Sided, Ltd)
- Hopewell "Small Places" (Zeal Records, 2000 7" Single)
- Hopewell "Safe As Milk" (Cutty Shark, 2001 CD/ 7" Single)
- Hopewell "The Angel Is My Watermark" (Cutty Shark, 2001 CD/ 7" Single)
- Hopewell "The Notbirds EP" (Sunnylane / South Cherry Entropy, 2006 EP)
- Hopewell "Hopewell" / "Lions & Tigers Keep - Mother Vol 3" (Fire Records, 2006 10" Ltd)
- Hopewell "Good Good Good Desperation" / "Opus Part 2" (TeePee Records, 2009 7" Single)
- Hopewell "Another Music" (TeePee Records, 2012 CD/7" Single)

=== Compilations ===
- Hopewell Clooney Tunes (Fierce Panda Records, 2000)
- Hopewell Psychedelica Vol: 2 (Northern Star Records, 2007)
- Hopewell Psychedelica Vol: 4 (Northern Star Records, 2011)
- Hopewell Songs From A Sonic Land (Reverb Records, 2011)
- Half feat. Jason Sebastian Russo Blue Thunder, a Tribute to Galaxie 500 (TBTCI, 2016)
