= Let It Come Down =

Let It Come Down may refer to:

- Let It Come Down (novel), a 1952 novel by Paul Bowles
- Let It Come Down (James Iha album)
- Let It Come Down (Spiritualized album)
- Let It Come Down (St. Johnny album)

== See also ==
- "Let it come down" is a line from Shakespeare's play Macbeth, Act III, Scene 3
