= Supercollider (disambiguation) =

A supercollider is a high energy particle accelerator.

Supercollider may also refer to:

== Music ==
- Super Collider (band), an electronic and soul-revivalist musical group formed in 1998
- "Supercollider" (song), a 2011 song by Radiohead
- Super Collider (album), a 2013 album by the band Megadeth, and the album's title track
- "Supercollider", a song by Fountains of Wayne from Welcome Interstate Managers
- "Supercollider", a 1993 single by Tribe
- Super Collider, 2010 musical piece by Christine Southworth written for the Kronos Quartet and Gamelan Elektrika

== Other media ==
- Supercollider, a video game character in Freedom Force
- Supercollider, 2002 show by Keith Tyson at the South London Gallery, England
- "Supercollider", a series of 35mm digital animations by Marc Swadel and Paul Swadel
- Supercollider (film), a 2013 film directed by Jeffery Scott Lando starring Enzo Cilenti
- SuperCollider, software for audio synthesis and algorithmic music composition

== See also ==
- Collider
- List of accelerators in particle physics
