= Grand Mal =

Grand Mal may refer to:

- Grand Mal (New York City band), an alternative rock band
- Grand Mal (San Francisco band), a punk rock band
- Grand mal seizure, a seizure that affects the entire brain
- Grand Mal, Grenada
