= St. Johnny =

American rock band (active 1989–1995)

- Origin: Hartford, Connecticut, United States
- Genres: Alternative rock
- Years active: 1989–1995
- Labels: Ajax Records (Chicago), Rough Trade Records, Caroline Records, DGC Records, Geffen
- Members: Bill Whitten; Jim Roberto; Jim Elliot; Tom Goss; Tom Leonard; Wayne Letitia

St. Johnny were a Connecticut-based rock band, formed in 1989 and split c.1995. They were signed to DGC Records.

== Members ==
- Bill Whitten 1989–1995 (vocals, guitar)
- Tom Leonard 1989–1993 (guitar)
- Jim Elliot 1989–1995 (bass) Died 2016
- Wayne Letitia 1989–1994 (drums)
- Sean Mackowiak 1989–1990 (guitar)
- "Lucky" Jim Roberto 1993–1995 (guitar)
- Tom Goss 1994–1995 (drums)

== Discography ==
St. Johnny releases include:

=== Singles & EPs ===
- Four Songs (7") (Asthma Record) 1992
- "Go to Sleep" (7″) (Ajax Records) 1992
- "A Car or a Boy" (7″) (DGC) 1993
- "Gilligan"/"Live at the Sports Page Cafe…" (7″) (Twisted Village) 1994
- "I Give Up"/"One of the Boys" (7″) (Love Kit) 1994
- "Scuba Diving"/"Welcome Back Kotter" (7″) (DGC)

=== Albums ===
- High as a Kite (Rough Trade [UK]/Caroline [US]) 1993
- Speed Is Dreaming (DGC) 1994
- Let It Come Down (DGC) 1995

=== Tracks Appear On ===
- “Ashes and Slashes” My Companion Turn of the Century (LP) 1990
- “Wild Goose Chasing” DGC Rarities: Vol. 1 (CD) (Geffen Records) 1994
- “Scuba Diving” Buy-Product (CD, Comp) (Geffen Records) 1995
- “Scuba Diving” CMJ New Music April – Volume 20 (CD, Promo) (College Music Journal) 1995
- Incredible Son of Swag (CD) (Geffen/DGC) 1995
