= All Flowers in Time =

- Official poster
- Directed by: Jonathan Caouette
- Written by: Jonathan Couette; Jessica Brunetto
- Produced by: Jonathan Caouette; Stephen Winter
- Starring: Chloë Sevigny; Joshua Caouette; Chandler Frantz; David Logan Rankin
- Cinematography: Sean Kirby; Jonathan Caouette; Jason Banker
- Edited by: Jessica Brunetto
- Distributed by: PHI Film; Quintessence Films; Tarnation Films
- Release date: May 2010 (Cannes)
- Running time: 13 minutes
- Country: United States
- Language: English

All Flowers in Time is a 2010 short surrealist horror film directed by Jonathan Caouette. The plot centers on a television signal that possesses young children, making them believe they can transform into other people or monsters. The film stars Chloë Sevigny and has been screened at several film festivals as of Fall 2010. Although it shares a similar name, the film's title is not directly connected to the Jeff Buckley song, "All Flowers in Time Bend Towards the Sun".

== Release ==
The film premiered at Cannes Film Festival in Cannes, France in May 2010 and has since been screened at several festivals, including: New York Film Fest, BFI London Film Festival, ZeroFilm Fest, Sundance, and the Portland International Film Festival. The film was also shown before Darren Aronofsky's Black Swan (2010) at Cinema du Parc in December 2010.
