= Stars Like Fleas =

- Origin: Brooklyn, New York, USA
- Genres: Experimental rock Indie rock
- Years active: 1998–present
- Labels: Hometapes, Praemedia, Talitres
- Members: Shannon Fields; Montgomery Knott; Ryan Smith; Tianna Kennedy; Ryan Sawyer; Matt Lavelle; Shayna Dulberger; Laura Ortman; Sam Amidon; Jon Natchez; Shelley Burgon
- Website: Official website

Stars Like Fleas is a Brooklyn-based band formed by multi-instrumentalist Shannon Fields and vocalist Montgomery Knott in the winter of 1998. Frequently compared to later Talk Talk and Robert Wyatt, their music blends avant-jazz and free improvisation with electronic textures and several overdubbed murmured vocal lines.

== History ==
The band started in 1998. On their albums and in live performances, Fields and Knott have recruited a host of other musicians, including members and ex-members of Other Dimensions in Music, TEST, No-Neck Blues Band, Papa M, Out Hud, Gold Sparkle Band, At the Drive-In, Beirut, Tall Firs, TV on the Radio, Celebration, Fiery Furnaces, The Silent League, and Mercury Rev.

Pitchfork critic Grayson Currin described Stars Like Fleas' music as being "rife with references and influences", ranging "from Orchestral Manoeuvres in the Dark and David Byrne to Gary Numan and Bill Laswell".

== Members ==
- Shannon Fields - producer
- Montgomery Knott - vocals
- Ryan Smith - piano, synthesizers, laptop, many other things
- Ryan Sawyer - drums, percussion
- Matt Lavelle - bass clarinet, flugelhorn, trumpet, cuica
- Sam Amidon - fiddle, banjo, voice
- Jon Natchez - reeds, brass, strings, keys, etc.
- Gerald Menke - pedal steel, dobro resonator, guitars
- Shelley Burgon - harp, laptop, baritone guitar
- Tianna Kennedy - cello
- Shayna Dulberger - bass
- Laura Ortman - violin

== Discography ==
- Took the Ass for a Drive (1999; digitally re-released by File 13 2007, downloadable at iTunes)
- Sun Lights Down on the Fence (2003, Praemedia)
- The Ken Burns Effect (2007, Talitres Records in Europe) (May 20, 2008 Hometapes, distribution via Absolutely Kosher/Misra)
