= MIX NYC =

Experimental LGBT film festival in New York City

MIX NYC is a nonprofit organization based in New York City dedicated to queer experimental film. MIX has supported filmmaking workshops, queer history programs such as the ACT UP Oral History Project (on video) and film restorations of work by important queer filmmakers such as Jack Smith. It is also known as the "MIX festival" for its most visible program, the annual week-long New York Queer Experimental Film Festival (NYQEFF), a highly-influential cultural event since 1987, which has supported curators such as Shari Frilot and featured early works by filmmakers such as Christine Vachon, Todd Haynes, Isaac Julien, Thomas Allen Harris, Barbara Hammer, Juan Carlos Zaldivar, Jonathan Caouette, Jennie Livingston, Gus Van Sant, and Matthew Mishory. The festival has held a critical role in both promoting experimental work by queer filmmakers, and in the evolution of radical queer culture via the "organisational mediation of collective identity".

== History ==
=== 1980s-1990s ===
==== 1987 - 1992 ====
MIX was founded in 1987 by Sarah Schulman and Jim Hubbard, who felt the newly emerging Gay Film Festivals weren't including formally inventive work, while the vibrant experimental film venues of the time marginalized gay and lesbian work. They were aided by curators Jack Waters and Peter Cramer from Naked Eye Cinema, and Ela Troyano who programmed The New York Film Festival Downtown. The first festival, titled A Queer Sort of Film, screened at Millennium film Workshop in the East Village, and featured the world premiere of Su Friedrich's Damned If You Don't, and Juan Carlos Zaldivar's Palingenesis.

The festival was a showcase for emerging artists, new works by established artists, and archival masters. Notable early screenings included Barbara Rubin's Christmas on Earth and Andy Warhol's Blow Job, the latter of which was attended by Kitty Carlisle Hart in a gown with a tuxedo'd escort.

The New York Lesbian & Gay Experimental Film Festival (NYLGEFF), in concert with the emerging AIDS activist and Queer activist movement of the day, became a mass cultural event in the LGBTQ underground. The festival screened work by several filmmakers including Barbara Hammer, Michelle Handelman, Nisha Ganatra, Teri Rice, Juan Carlos Zaldivar and Isaac Julien, and found ways of screening works by makers like Chantal Akerman, who otherwise considered it "reductive" to screen in gay and lesbian film festivals.

A counter-culture of new interest in filmmaking and video production emerged around the festival community, which soon became influential on other programming venues, often contributing significant work to The Whitney Biennial, Berlin International Film Festival and other important screens. MIX exhibited the first films of major lesbian, gay and bisexual filmmakers including Christine Vachon's first film, Todd Haynes' college thesis film Assassins: A Film Concerning Rimbaud (which got him his first review, ever), Maria Maggenti's Name Day, and the first screening of Jennie Livingston's Paris Is Burning, when it was still on a dual system.

MIX programmed work marginalized from other festivals, including transgender work from the very first year, with Marguerite Paris's film All Women Are Equal (29mins, 1978), which would be restored by the festival in later years. MIX curated the first programme of films by and about black gay men, in any film festival, and screened gay experimental film from other countries. Hubbard and Schulman also toured films to international venues around the US, Brazil, Europe and Japan.

Schulman and Hubbard labored to gain press review coverage for gay experimental work, often holding individual press screenings at the critics' convenience. They hand wheat-pasted posters on buildings around the city, and leafleted areas where gay people hung out, like the piers and bars.

Hubbard and Schulman prioritized artists' fees, paying all makers equally regardless of the length of their work, since in experimental film, labor intensity was not always determined by length. MIX received no funding, running as a community event from 1987-1991, yet managed to break even on enthusiastic box office support. Friday nights were guaranteed sold-out "Lesbian Date Nights". However, Schulman and Hubbard ensured no one was ever turned away from MIX, if unable to pay for a ticket.

As filmmakers began to die of HIV/AIDS, in this era, Hubbard became active in film preservation, beginning with the film Avocada by the late Bill Vehr of the Ridiculous Theatrical Company. Hubbard preserved over 2,000 hours of AIDS Film and Video, now available for free viewing at the New York Public Library.

The 1992 festival was organized by Hubbard and filmmakers Marguerite Paris and Jerry Tartaglia, as Schulman left to devote more time to her writing. That year introduced programs by guest curators, who brought new perspectives to the line-up. Notable shows included Our Fanzine Friends, which drew upon the hot trend of queer zines, featuring work by Glenn Belverio and Bruce LaBruce. Fire, a program of work from the African diaspora, featured work by Dawn Suggs, Shari Frilot, Thomas Allen Harris and others.

==== 1993 - 1996 ====
In 1993, the festival became known as MIX: The New York Lesbian and Gay Experimental Film Festival, and Shari Frilot and Karim Aïnouz became co-directors, introducing many changes, including a new venue at The Kitchen (instead of Anthology Film Archives), production of a formal catalog, and a commitment to multicultural queer film and installation art. A standout program was The 1000 Dreams of Desire, curated by Jim Lyons. The show was staged at the Ann Street Bookstore in Lower Manhattan, where the peep booths were reprogrammed with experimental video, and 16 mm film was projected in a separate room, such as Teri Rice's The Kindling Point and Les Affaires. Ainouz and Frilot helped initiate satellite festivals MIX Brasil (1993) and MIX Mexico (1996).

From 1994, Frilot became the definitive voice of MIX, as Ainouz began to scale back his involvement. Frilot made the organization a home for emerging filmmakers and makers of color. This was signaled by 1994's opening film Brincando El Charco, and more powerfully still when 1995's opening and closing events were from makers of color. These films, Thomas Allen Harris's Vintage: Families of Value, and Frilot's own documentary Black Nations/Queer Nations, brought important new audiences to MIX. MIX returned to Anthology, and merged with Downtown Community Television Center (DCTV)'s Lookout Lesbian & Gay Video Festival, as DCTV's building was under renovation.

The 1995 festival saw ongoing debate as to the festival's name, Ainouz commenting it needed to be rethought, "almost epistemologically". given the range of perspectives the festival included at this time, that stemmed from more mutable visions of queer subjectivity and collectivity than a "gay and lesbian" label suggested, and which was an element of the festival's significance, in contrast to the largely representational politics of other LGBT festivals at the time.

Frilot's other legacy in this era was a commitment to installation work and the nascent digital realm. Installations had previously been on view in 1993 on the upper floor of The Kitchen, but from 1994, MIX NYC staff began devoting substantial space and resources to installations. Shu Lea Cheang and Beth Stryker curated the first formal installation program Cyberqueer, in the basement galleries of Anthology. Frilot went on to become a senior programmer at the Sundance Film Festival and curator of the New Frontier program.

==== 1996: 10th Anniversary of MIX ====
1996, in honor of the festival's 10th anniversary, presented queer work from the African diaspora at the Victoria Theater in Harlem (the first queer cultural festival held there), including work by Marlon Riggs, Cheryl Dunye and Isaac Julien, alongside Ballroom events hosted by House of Latex, in addition to programs at NYU's Cantor Film Center and the Knitting Factory downtown.

==== 1997-2000 ====
From 1997, Rajendra Roy was in charge, and the festival moved to Cinema Village, when it was a single-screen theater on E. 12th Street. Roy brought on Anie Stanley as artistic director in 1998, and as a team they propelled MIX to greater visibility, with greater support from corporate sponsors and less emphasis on the identity politics of the early 1990s. Roy went on to be the Celeste Bartos Chief Curator of Film at the Museum of Modern Art.

Ernesto Foronda and Maïa Cybelle Carpenter were programming coordinators in 1997, with Carpenter staying on in this role until 1999, and curating individual programs in years to follow. 1998 also saw a sidebar of 8mm film curated by Stephen Kent Jusick, featuring work by Jack Smith, Juan Carlos Zaldivar' The Story of the Red Rose and Andy Warhol's Polavision home movies.

=== Early 2000s ===
==== 2001 - 2002 ====
Ioannis Mookas assumed the title of Executive Director in 2001, as Roy & Stanley stepped down. The festival suffered after 9/11, as the organization's offices had been in the financial district. Mookas departed after overseeing the 2001 and 2002 festivals.

==== 2003 - 2005 ====
From 2003, Larry Shea and Stephen Winter took the film festival's helm. MIX also took a new direction as an organization in 2003, when Hubbard and Schulman initiated the ACT UP Oral History Project, funded by the Ford Foundation, widening the scope of MIX as an organisation beyond the festival itself.

A large-scale installation about garment workers, Cake, by Mary Ellen Strom & Ann Carlson, debuted at South Street Seaport as a 2003 festival centerpiece. Shea and Winter also reimagined 1993's 1000 Dreams of Desire program, re-staging it after 10 years, with differences, yet at its original Ann Street location. In addition to the video booths, and screening room on the upper floor, the basement was also cleared out, setting up MIX's first immersive space to feature a dance floor and DJs, and ambient 16mm & 8mm film projections.

Jonathan Caouette's collagist, multimedia independent documentary Tarnation: which was about his life with a mother who survived sexual assault and mental illness, was shepherded into being under Stephen Winter's supervision as Producer, after being handed an early cut by John Cameron Mitchell, became a standout indie feature of 2005. MIX's 2003 premiere of Caouette's “beautiful, cubist act of self-exploration,” was the beginning of a path, with support from Executive Producers Mitchell and Gus Van Sant, to Cannes and a numerous screenings and awards at international film festivals, and distribution deal with Wellspring.

MIX failed to capitalize financially on the success of Tarnation, with money troubles leading Shea to skip 2004's festival and move the next iteration to April 2005. Meanwhile, however, MIX expanded its work as an organisation, with the 2004 introduction of MIXtv, airing weekly on Manhattan Neighborhood Network.

2004's opening night "happening" was held in Manhattan's NoMad district in the Beaux-Arts Gershwin Hotel, with regular screenings back at Anthology Film Archives. The festival featured t-shirts for the first time since 1996, created by artist Jim Morrison.

MIX 2005 began a community screening program, taking screenings to various neighborhoods and communities around New York, beginning in February with The Bronx. 2005 would also be Larry Shea's last MIX festival as a director, as he departed to devote time to his video art practice.

=== 2006 - 2015: Warehouse Era ===
Executive Director Stephen Kent Jusick was appointed along Co-Directors Andre Hereford, Szu Burgess, and Kate Huh, as a new team in fall of 2005, in an era of renewed queer sexual liberation, John Cameron Mitchell's Shortbus (featuring Jusick as an on-screen character, and itself based on New York's contemporary queer art, dance and sex parties organised by Jusick, Mitchell and others), as well as flourishing Radical Faeries, radical queer rural land communes and anti-assimilationist queer social movements such as Gay Shame, each of which were key elements of MIX in this period.

==== 2006: MIX 19 ====
Moving MIX back to its traditional November time-slot was the first decision of the new staff. In May 2006, MIX initiated new fundraising activities with the Naked Eye Celebrity Camera benefit, auctioning off disposable cameras exposed by artists and celebrities including Laurie Anderson, Gus Van Sant, B.D. Wong, Alec Soth and over 100 others.

The 19th MIX festival was held in 2006 at the new 3LD Art & Technology Center in Lower Manhattan. The space featured two screening rooms, window installations, and an installations lounge with an interactive exhibition of nude Polaroids entitled Blind Trust by Cuban-American filmmaker Juan Carlos Zaldivar.

==== 2007: MIX 20 ====
The 20th MIX festival began in 2007 with a name change, to MIX NYC: The New York Queer Experimental Film Festival, after requests from the public for a more inclusive name than "Lesbian and Gay", that would embrace contemporary terminology.

Held in an empty storefront in SoHo, marking a shift away from traditional theater venues, installations filled the space, and led back to a makeshift screening room. Additional installations were in the mezzanine, overlooking the entire space.

Several shows were packed, including the Butt magazine show, and the Homoccult and other Esoterotica program, guest curated by Daniel McKernan and Richie Rennt. Another highlight was a screening of a rare 16mm print of footage of the 1971 gay pride march in New York, filmed by Women's Liberation Cinema (Kate Millett and Susan Kleckner, among others), featuring a live audio accompaniment by artistt Sharon Hayes Hayes continued working with this material, which was included in Hayes's 2012 show at the Whitney Museum.

==== 2008: MIX 21 ====
In 2008 MIX took over a former Liz Claiborne department store in the South Street Seaport, filling every nook and cranny with installations, decorations and performances. The festival took place in October, earlier than its traditional mid-November dates, because the space, donated free of charge by the landlord, was only available at that time. MIX NYC initiated a new program of festival T-shirts designed by artists Diego Montoya and Nickolas Bullock, Carlo Quispe and Ethan Shoshan, PolyVestedRelics, Kate Huh and Ginger Brooks Takahashi, each available in a limited edition.

The festival included installations from artists such as the perennial Peter Cramer, Jessica Dellacave, Kate Huh, feminist art punk band Chicks on Speed, Desireena Almoradie, Atif Toor and a work featuring analog televisions and several sculptures by Effie Asili.

Film restorations from the MIX Memorization project included All Women Are Equal (15mins, 1971) an historically significant early work on 16mm about transgender experience by transgender filmmaker, Marguerite Paris. Influential experimental filmmaker Jack Smith's Sailors of Sinbad (29mins, 1978), filmed at Coney Island's Sahara, was presented by filmmaker / academic Jeremy Tartaglia.

The program Hollyweird: Queered Movies curated by filmmaker Kristen Anchor, evoked the culture-jamming spirit of the time, in which "artists, scholars, fans and critics claim cultural and political agency by interrupting, re-visioning, and queering texts." Other programs focused on war, collaborative film projects across boundaries between "bioboys and tranny boys, dykes and fags, girls and ladies, sissies and butches", films created in MIX NYC workshops, sex and relationships, comedic parodies of cis-heterosexism, dance film, queer embodiment and queer subjectivity. Karen Hines' My Name is Pochsy (7mins, 2008) was a standout short.

==== 2009: MIX 22 ====
The 2009 festival took place in Chelsea for the first time since 1993, this time in an 7,000-square-foot (650 m^{2}) empty storefront of a newly constructed condo building. The festival suffered some noise complaints from condo residents above, who felt that festival-goers were too loud.

Ceiling to floor glass windows gave MIX unprecedented street visibility, including projections by Lori Hiris and Kadet Kuhne. Installations were prominent again, most notably a large geodesic dome that was Wildflowers of Manitoba, by Luis Jacob and Noam Gonick. A live actor inhabited the dome, silently lying there, listening to records, lighting incense and ruminating, while 3 projections illuminated some of the panels with scenes of a same-sex love and commitment.

The closing night feature Maggots & Men, a celebrated short film and trans reimagining of the Kronstadt rebellion by Cary Cronenwett was sold out, as were several other programmes.

==== 2010: MIX 23 ====
The 23rd MIX festival was held at Theater for the New City, back in the East Village. Using three theater spaces in the TNC complex, MIX emphasized an immersive environment with a string art design in the venue by Diego Montoya. One smaller theater contained a performative installation by Daniel Pillis. Another theater was turned into an installation lounge, anchored by Blaise Garber-Paul's Queer Fruit Tree, which grew and changed throughout the week, and under which visitors could sit on astroturf, or on conical black cushions. The sold out closing night film was Bruce LaBruce's L.A. Zombie, with a second screening added.

==== 2011: MIX 24 ====
In 2011 MIX took over a disused theater on Bleecker Street. The festival trailer, made on 16mm film by Gina Carducci, was projected on a continuous loop onto the building across the street, above the subway entrance. The venue design told a story of sorts. The lobby was dark with back-lit curtains that gave the impression of being in outer space. From there visitors could enter the screening room, or venture through lush psychedelic forest, and down steps to a subterranean space cave made of pink paper mache and pointy pink pillows. This downstairs space was a lounge, had a second stage used for performances, and contained most of the installations, including work by Adriana Varella, Szu Burgess, Coco Rico and others.

The Occupy Wall Street movement was surging at this time, and the NYPD raided Zuccotti Park just before the festival opened. MIX made the decision to open the venue as a sanctuary for queer Occupiers, who became embedded within the festival for years to come.

==== 2012: MIX 25 ====
The 25th MIX Festival took place during the aftermath of Hurricane Sandy, in November 2012, in a two-story 20,000 sq/f former nut roasting factory in the Gowanus section of Brooklyn, the first time the festival had been held outside Manhattan. Despite challenges due to the weather, the festival was a success.

The first floor was a wide-open space that contained all of the many installations, as well as a small performance stage and many lounging areas. An interior design of spandex "explosions" filled the space, often running from ceiling to floor. The second floor, accessible only by a steep staircase, held the screening room, as well as 2 restrooms and administrative space.

Bradford Nordeen, creative director of Los Angeles queer film collective Dirty Looks curated a historical program including Barbara Hammer's 1974 foundational experimental lesbian film Dyketactics, Jeremy Tartaglia's AIDS era Ecce Homo (1989) and Tom Kalin's Confirmed Bachelor (1991). Queer temporal art in the internet age was interrogated by program The Coming Disturbance, featuring work by Zach Blas and others.

The festival screened features such as She Male Snails (2012) by Ester Martin Bergsmark, who spoke after the screening of the (perhaps unexpected) influence of radical feminists on their creative evolution. The closing night feature was She Said Boom (2012), about the highly-influential Toronto Queercore punk band Fifth Column, with band member Caroline Azar in attendance.

==== 2013: MIX 26 ====
After the success of the festival in Brooklyn, the festival returned to Gowanus in 2013, taking over a 25,000 sf warehouse, which gave over about 15,000 sf to installation work, and 3600 sf screening room. The festival's visual theme was body parts, and a giant inflatable lung, which breathed slightly, greeted festival-goers as they entered. There were other inflatables, including Rachel Shannon's Breastival Vestibules, and other plastics that resembled veins.

The festival was once again well-attended, with an audience which MIX 26 programmer Charlie Corbett describes as "a radical, articulate, dont-fuck-with-me crowd that can be difficult to wrangle and impossible to spoon feed... They have to hit hard because these images and the language we use to describe them are a matter of life and death – together they dictate the kind of personhood that’s possible."

The cinephiles are the ones who buy tickets to screenings while the radical dreamers are chilling in our lounge. But when the screenings are out, and the film geeks join forces and mingle and become apart of the radical dreamer crowd – it’s like Nietzsche’s Apollo and Dionysus coming together – they fuse and bring about the Birth of Tragedy. In 2010 I saw it for the first time and I still haven’t left.

— Charlie Corbett, Indiewire

Guest curators Gina Carducci & Andrew Lampert presented an all-Super8mm program featuring the work of japanese experimental filmmaker Stom Stogo along with numerous other works shot on popular amateur formats such as SuperVHS. It also featured two programs "Exploding Lineages" of "Asian avant-garde. Genderqueer love. Anarchy. Ancestral trauma." by QPOC filmmakers, curated by KB Boyce and Celeste Chan of Queer Rebel Productions.

The festival opened with new work from Jonathan Caouette in his return to the festival with a new film that he finished hours before the screening at MIX NYC along with "12 of the best short queer experimental films received by the MIX Programming Committee":

Welcome, lover-army of fringe-dwelling geniuses! Queers building community! Welcome destroyers of mainstream mediocrity! Whatever you are, let’s come together to reflect and enjoy immersive bodily experiences.

— MIX NYC, MIX NYC

The festival screened new work from returning filmmaker Cary Cronenwett, and new feature Valencia the Movie (2013) "filmed by 20 different lesbian, queer, and trans directors... (including Cheryl Dunye, Silas Howard, and recent Sundance award-winner [Joey] Soloway)" and based on the novel by Michelle Tea.

Silas Howard also premiered his documentary about legendary transgender performer Bambi Lake, her life in, and influence on, queer punk, and the queer and counter-cultural golden days of 1970s San Francisco.

==== 2014: MIX 27 ====
With MIX 27, in November 2014, the festival reached its apotheosis of this era. Given a "Hive" theme, hundreds of volunteers from all over the USA and beyond returned to a giant warehouse in Brooklyn to create a "giant queer art build". Taking "weeks and weeks, as tons of volunteers clean, paint, build and create" it was designed once again by Diego Montoya, with much of the recycled art material donated by Materials for the Arts. One of the main design features was a gigantic mass of thousands of hand-folded and hand-painted flowers, created by MIX regular Bizzy Barefoot and countless radical queers who worked, slept and ate together in the warehouse for up to two weeks prior to the event.

We are building an opulent beehive cathedral... our lounge area is centered around pollination. We’re building a suspended geodesic dome with a million hand-made flowers. We’re painting the ceiling the on the floor like a reverse Sistine Chapel -- and lots of cloud pillows.

— Diego Montoya, HuffPost

Caitlin Rose Sweet and Andre Azevado co-curated installation work from 13 artists from around the world including Aeon Helme's installation, which festival-goers experienced as they entered the front door, consisting of a nearly life-sized trailer caravan projected with the work of several artists from Australia including Justin Shoulder and Bhenji Ra, Jackson Stacey and Nina Buchanan, alongside poetry written by author Vincent Silk.

Screenings and after-parties on the weekend brought unprecedented crowds to MIX NYC, made up of queers, yet also a wider scope of audience members and party-goers from New York's art world, who managed to pack out the expansive warehouse spaces and spill out onto the street, with some from the festival wondering if it had grown too big, or for whom.

==== 2015: MIX 28 ====
In 2015 the festival, facing financial pressures from the previous year's maximalist iteration, was a smaller though still substantial event held at a former clothing factory in Sunset Park, Brooklyn. The event included films by "Lasse Långström (Sweden), Stephanie Winter (Germany), Nataly Lebouleux (UK), Tzuan Wu (Taiwan), Sonya Reynolds and Lauren Hortie (Canada), Soyoon Kim (South Korea), and Kemar Jewel and Andrew Paszkiewicz (US) on the opening night alone".

It also featured a film program curated by members of XFR Collective, an archiving group which offered to digitize attendees' home videos and other film for free.

It once more featured a dozen moving image and interactive installations, such as citational abject feminist work from returning artist Aeon Helme and a crew of Sydney-based creative collaborators, and the work of artists including JD Samson (of Le Tigre) and Drew Denny.

The festival continued in the same hedonistic, exhibitionist and sex-positive vein that had flourished for several years under the festival's Executive Director Stephen Kent Jusick.

There's something about being in a fairly unfettered space in a non-commercial context that is liberating. Not everything has to be transactional, or so stringently rule-bound as so may parts of our other lives are, and the MIX NYC's festival allows for that. It's been an evolving place where people can be themselves.

— Stephen Kent Jusick, HuffPost

This was last festival under Jusick's direction. It was described by MIX's President Sloan Lesbowitz as "art that upends normalcy and challenges us".

Queers watch experimental film together to remind ourselves who we are, to reflect on our differences and consider what we share. Our embodied experiences are honored through radical expression, and at MIX we facilitate this expression in film, in shared immersive space, installations and performances.

— Sloan Lesbowitz, HuffPost

== 2024 Revitalization ==
After a pause, MIX was revived following the COVID-19 pandemic by Blake Pruitt and Alex Smith, with the support of former directors Stephen Winter and Jim Hubbard. One Night Stands, a series of experimental screenings, lead up to the festival's full-scale return.

=== 2024 ===
November 2024 saw the first Mix festival since 2018, as Mix Fest 2024, three nights of films at the Quad Cinema in Manhattan.

=== 2025 ===
2025's Museum of Mix event was curated by filmmaker/artist Jessica Dunn Rovinelli in collaboration with the Museum of Modern Art (MoMA) and organized by Aster Ryan (aka "angelray"). Held at a secret location in Brooklyn, the event featured 16mm prints from MoMA archives including work by José Rodriguez Soltero, Tom Chomont, Peggy Ahwesh and others. In addition to film programming, the "Museum" included installations such as: My Body is an Object, The Camera Is A Gun by Cr4ckrock, Surveillance Photobooth by Day Lane and Janie Jaffe, Eyeball Palace by Nica Ross, and Sweet Nothing by Gabriel Lee.

== MIX Festival spin-offs ==
1993 marked the founding of MIX Brasil in São Paulo, the first branch of MIX outside of the USA, with support from the New York organizers and Brazilian leadership, forming a long-running connection between MIX NYC and Brazilian queer culture. MIX Mexico, Hispanic America's longest-running LGBTQ+ film festival, was founded in 1996 by the late filmmaker Arturo Castelan. MIX Milano and MIX Copenhagen were founded in 2008 and 2011 respectively.

== See also ==
- LGBT culture in New York City
- List of LGBTQ film festivals
