= High as a Kite =

Studio album by St. Johnny
- Released: 1993
- Genre: Alternative rock
- Length: 45:27
- Language: English
- Label: Caroline; Rough Trade
- Producer: St. Johnny

St. Johnny chronology
High as a Kite (1993)	Speed Is Dreaming (1994)

High as a Kite is the debut studio album by American alternative rock band St. Johnny.

== Reception ==
Editors at AllMusic Guide rated this album three out of five stars, with critic Nitsuh Abebe noting the lack of production and polish on the album, which could be an asset for listeners who prefer that sound, but the quality is still as high as their other releases and will be interesting for fans of their later releases. Andrew Earles highlighted this album in Gimme Indie Rock: 500 Essential American Underground Rock Albums 1981-1996, calling this "straight-ahead but excellent Sonic-Youth-meets-Pavement-meets-Dinosaur, Jr. indie mope-rock". In an overview of the band's career for Trouser Press, Deborah Sprague considers the band's early recordings "less nihilistic than they are just plain bored" and notes that the band's sound improved after signing to DGC.

== Track listing ==
All songs written by Jim Elliott, Tom Leonard, Wayne Letitia, and Bill Whitten

1. "Go to Sleep – 3:44
2. "God in My Head – 3:55
3. "Highway – 3:45
4. "Velocity – 3:40
5. "My Father's Father – 3:36
6. "Matador – 3:29
7. "Black – 3:46
8. "Stupid – 3:16
9. "High as a Kite – 3:53
10. "Ashes/Slashes – 3:18
11. "Unclean" – 9:00

== Personnel ==
St. Johnny

- Jim Elliott – bass guitar, production
- Tom Leonard – guitar, production
- Wayne Letitia – drums, production
- Bill Whitten – guitar, vocals, production

Additional personnel

- Mike Deming – engineering, saxophone
- Joe Elliott – photography
- Grasshopper – guitar
- Steve Wytas – engineering

== See also ==
- List of 1993 albums
