= Walk Away Renee (film) =

- Directed by: Jonathan Caouette
- Written by: Jonathan Caouette
- Produced by: Jonathan Caouette; Gérard Lacroix; Pierre-Paul Puljiz
- Starring: Jonathan Caouette; Renee Leblanc; Adolph Davis; David Sanin; Joshua Caouette
- Cinematography: Noam Roubah; Andres Peyrot; Jason Banker; Jorge Torres
- Edited by: Brian Mc Allister
- Music by: Simon Raymonde
- Distributed by: Sundance Selects (2012, USA); UFO Distribution (2012, France)
- Release date: May 14, 2011 (Cannes)
- Running time: 90 min.
- Country: United States
- Language: English

Walk Away Renee is a 2011 American documentary film directed by Jonathan Caouette. It is the third full-length feature in Caouette's filmography.

== Summary ==
Intended as a companion to Caouette's first film, Tarnation, Walk Away Renee documents Caouette's cross-country journey with his mother, Renee Leblanc. Leblanc, diagnosed with acute bipolar and schizoaffective disorder, is to enter an assisted living facility close to Caouette's home, therefore necessitating a move from Houston to New York City.

== Production ==
The film was screened as a "work in progress" at the 2011 Festival de Cannes Critics Week. In July, 2011 distributor Sundance Selects acquired the distribution rights to the film.

== Cast ==
- Jonathan Caouette, Himself
- Joshua Caouette, Himself
- Zoe Emre Dahan, Young Mother
- Adolph Davis, Himself
- Gavin Octavien, Dr. Ubiddia
- Eva Dorrepaal, Cloudbuster Member
- Renee Leblanc, Herself
