= Jessica Dunn Rovinelli =

American filmmaker and editor

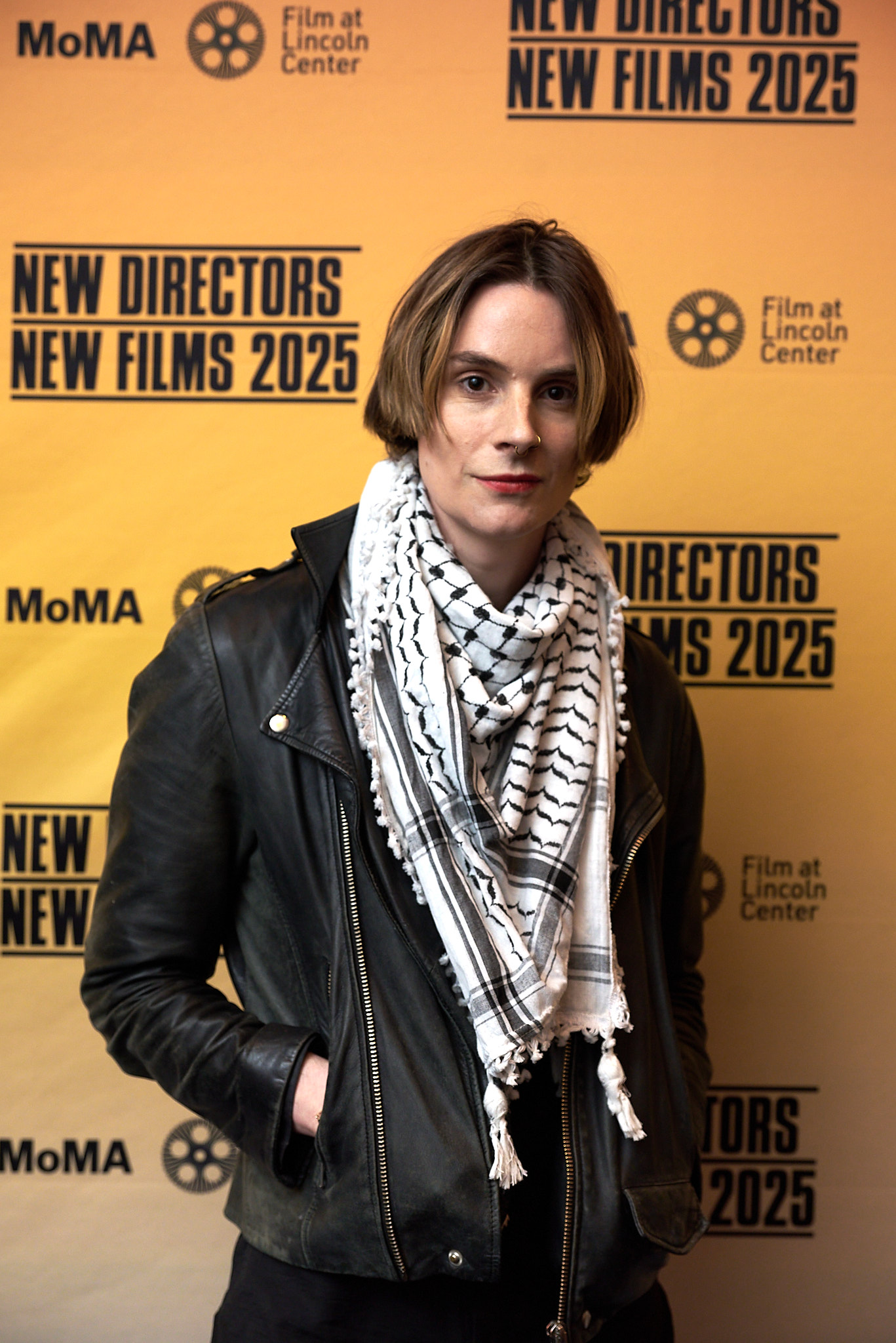
Jessica Dunn Rovinelli in 2025

Jessica Dunn Rovinelli (born March 16, 1988) is an American filmmaker, editor, colorist, critic and photographer. Rovinelli is known for her 2016 and 2019 feature films titled So Pretty and Empathy which explore sexuality and queerness. She is a Lesbian

== Background ==
Jessica Dunn Rovinelli was born on March 16, 1988. She studied film at Wesleyan University in Connecticut but states that her film education were the New York movie theatres.

She lives in New York where she edits commercials and branded content, and writes for magazines such as The Guardian and Filmmaker.

== Art ==
Dunn Rovinelli worked as a film critic. She directed two short films: We’ve Loved You So Much (2012) and Fuck Work (2014). Her first feature documentary film titled Empathy (2016) focus on a heroin-addicted sex worker. In her Brooklyn Magazine interview, the filmmakers states her interest in the subjects of sex and work.

Her second feature film, So Pretty (2019), focuses on a group of queer young people who form a community inside a Brooklyn apartment. It premiered at the Berlinale, earning awards at international festivals.

In 2019, Filmmaker Magazine featured her as one of the 25 New Faces of Independent Film.

In 2025, she curated the Museum of MIX Spring Exhibition in collaboration with the Museum of Modern Art for the revival of the MIX NYC Film Festival.

== Filmography ==
| Year | Film | Type |
|---|---|---|
| 2012 | We've Loved You So Much | Short film |
| 2014 | Fuck Work | Short film |
| 2016 | Empathy | Feature film |
| 2019 | So Pretty | Feature film |
| 2020 | Marriage Story | Short film |
| 2024 | Life Story | Short film |
