= Jonathan Toubin =

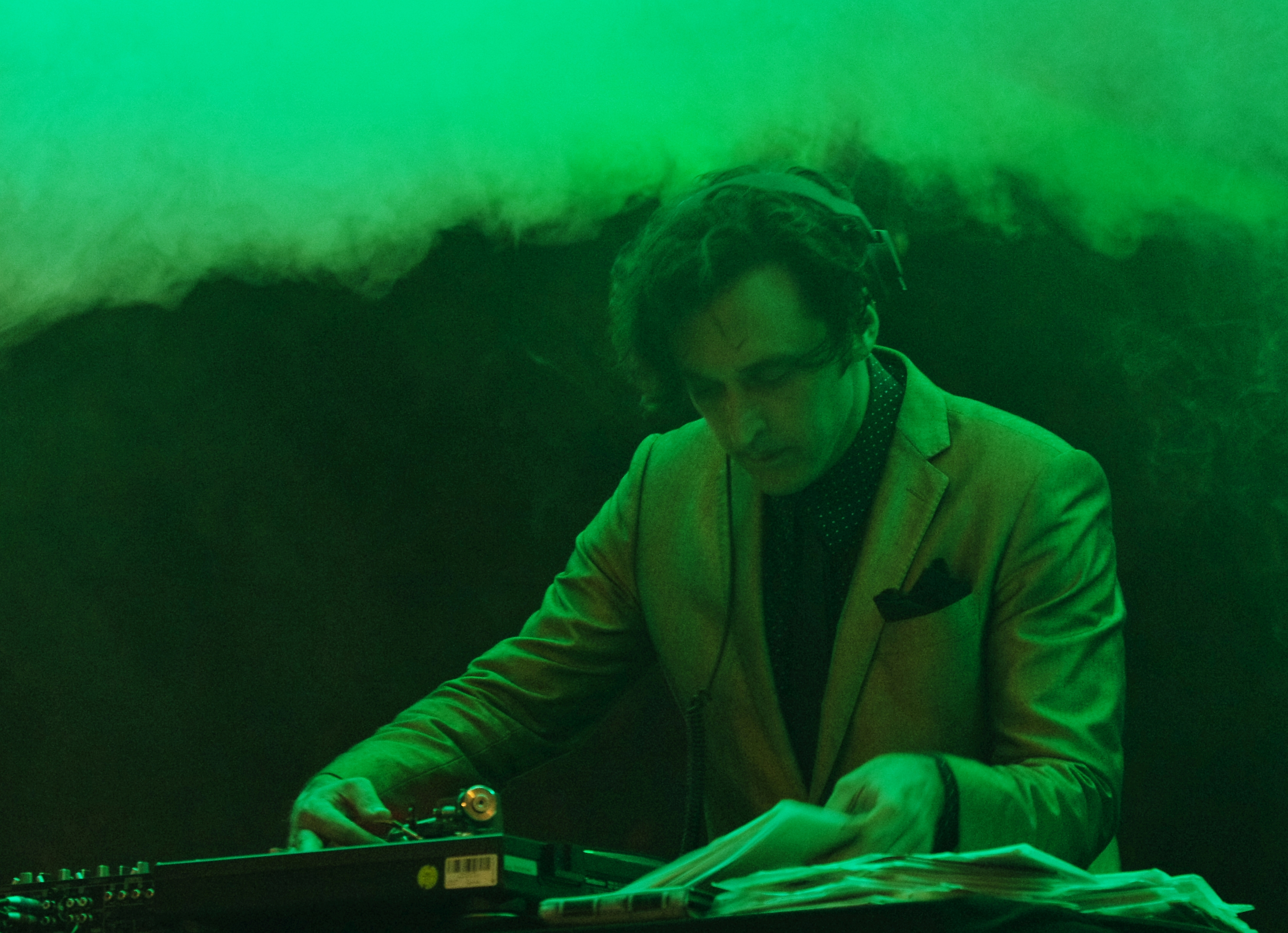
- Jonathan Toubin performing at Haldern Pop 2014

Background information
- Born: Jonathan Toubin; July 29, 1971 (age 54)
- Origin: Austin, Texas, United States
- Genres: R&B, soul, rock and roll
- Occupations: DJ, event producer, record producer
- Years active: 1991–present
- Labels: New York Night Train, Burger Records
- Website: www.newyorknighttrain.com/

Jonathan Toubin (born July 29, 1971) is an American DJ, record producer, musician, writer, and historian. He is the founder and proprietor of the New York Night Train event production company. Heralded "The most-liked man in the soul music scene" by Rolling Stone and "New York's best DJ" and "the only DJ we actually like" by VICE, Toubin is best known for his energetic dance party sets consisting of tightly juxtaposed obscure 1950s and 1960s Rhythm and blues, rock and roll, and soul 45s. New York Times describes the DJ's fare as "cleaner and more appreciative of American pop music history than much of the rest.". He is also known for his New York Night Train parties and their role in "revamping the entire landscape of New York and Brooklyn from midnight till the after hours" in what the Village Voice describes as "his own kind of dance revolution". His best known event is the New York Night Train Soul Clap and Dance-Off, which has been called "the most popular soul dance party in the world" by SXSW. It is the only soul dance party to have had an entire night dedicated to it at Lincoln Center Midsummer Night Swing and at SXSW, and plays in dozens of international markets and major festivals annually plus monthly at the Brooklyn Bowl. In over 1600 gigs since 2007, Toubin has appeared in hundreds of night clubs. In 2014, Toubin was voted Best New York DJ in the Village Voice Reader's Choice Contest. He currently has DJ compilations available on Burger Records and Norton Records.

== Early years and education ==
Born in 1971, Toubin grew up in Houston, Texas. As a child, he was obsessed with rock and roll. At age fifteen, he "put on punk shows...for anti-nuclear causes in the hardcore era." He moved to Austin in 1989 to attend the University of Texas where he received a B.A. in English. He also deejayed on their station KTSB, which later became KVRX. In 1998, he moved to New York where he subsequently joined the band Grand Mal. After the band lost their record deal with Slash Records and the shock of September 11 (he had worked in both of the Twin Towers), he quit music and entered the graduate program in American Studies at City University of New York. During this time, he published an academic paper for Institute for Studies in American Music titled "Uptown-Downtown: Hip Hop Music in Downtown Manhattan in the Early 1980s", which appeared in the anthology Critical Minded: New Approaches to Hip Hop Studies. He directly links this research to his approach to creating noteworthy events within the current music landscape stating, ""It definitely made me wonder what was going wrong with culture and if anybody could possibly do anything cool in terms of parties, unique music, public social culture, etc. in this day and age." He abandoned his thesis in 2005 and moved to Williamsburg in order to return to his music career.

== Career ==
=== Austin ===
Toubin's first professional DJ gig was The Dictators and Lunachicks show at The Back Room in Austin, TX in 1991 while he was still on student radio. Although he accepted a few more paid club gigs between bands at The Back Room, he was not interested in being a nightclub DJ and never pursued it any further. He played guitar in the band Cheezus from 1991 to 1992 and then in the band Noodle from 1992 to 1995 – with whom he toured the US and appeared on the ep's "I Sold Out to Fat Ass" (Rise Records) and "I Had A Wet Dream About the Girls from 90210" (Little Deputy) plus tracks on the compilations Live at Emo's Vol 1 (Rise), Penis Cowboy (Bunkhouse) and World War III (Bunkhouse). He then joined the band The Hamicks, with whom he would regularly record and tour with until 1998. His lead guitar can be found on the singles "Oxymorons"/”Networks" (Scooch Pooch 1996), "X-Ray Eyes"/”Dot to Dot" (Big Jerk 1996), "I Don't Believe in Valentines Day" split with the Primadonnas (Big Jerk 1996), the EP Ventriloquist Con-Artist (Framed 1997) the LP The Hamicks (Creepy Drifter 1999) and the compilations Lone Star Showdown II (Little Deputy 1997), Scooch Pooch Plays Their Original Sins (Scooch Pooch 1997) Toubin was also active in crafting the bands' aesthetics by creating their flyers and booking shows. He has appeared on a total of sixteen records as either a guitarist, bassist, organist, or vocalist.

=== New York ===
Not long after Toubin moved to New York in 1998, he joined the band Grand Mal – a band with a record deal on Slash in the U.S. and on London in the UK and a distribution deal on Polygram. [4] He plays bass on their Bad Timing LP (Arena Rock Recording Company, 2003) and guitar and organ on their song "Hey Man" on This Is Next Year: A Brooklyn Based Compilation (Arena Rock Recording Company 2001). In 2005, Toubin returned to music and joined post-punk band Cause For Applause. You can also hear Toubin's backing vocals on the track "I Don't Think So" on Psychic TV's Hell Is Invisible... Heaven Is Her/e.

==== 2005/2006: The Genesis of New York Night Train ====
On October 31, 2005, Toubin launched the New York Night Train webzine and record label to focus on the life and work of his friend ex-Cramps/The Gun Club/ Nick Cave and the Bad Seeds guitarist Kid Congo Powers and his new band Kid Congo and the Pink Monkeybirds and other underground music by his friends. His first New York Night Train party was held on March 3, 2006 at Lower East Side venue Tonic, and was a double-record release event for the label's first two LPs Kid Congo's compilation Solo Cholo (NYNT 001) and Kid Congo and the Pink Monkeybirds' debut Philosophy and Underwear (NYNT 003). That night also involved Julee Cruise, Ian Svenonius, Thalia Zedek, and Gibby Haynes, among others. Later that month, New York Night Train produced an official South by Southwest showcase at The Velvet Spade (currently the Mohawk) featuring Kid Congo and the Pink Monkeybirds, Viva l'American Death Ray Music, and Toubin's band at the time Cause for Applause. Toubin also presented two unofficial daytime showcases that weekend featuring a number of bands. On March 30, 2006, New York Night Train threw a release party for Grand Mal's "Love is the Best Con in Town" (NYNT 002) also at Tonic.

Around this time, Butthole Surfers' Gibby Haynes brought Toubin along to DJ with him at a gig on the South Williamsburg waterfront. He was also approached by Nation of Ulysses'/Make-Up/Chain and the Gang frontman Ian Svenonius and Beat Happening's Calvin Johnson to organize and promote two DJ gigs for them based on the success Kid Congo's Record Release party. These events, one in Williamsburg at Monkeytown August 21, 2006 and the other in Manhattan at Sub-Tonic August 22, 2006 were the first two exclusive New York Night Train dance parties. Soon, Toubin was asked to put together a DJ party for a Wednesday night he bartended at the Lower East Side's Motor City Bar. His first nights included guest Dj's, such as Gibby Haynes and Bob Bert from Sonic Youth. Over time, Toubin began doing most of the nights alone and wound up doing a weekly residency that lasted until ending with his accident in 2011.On these early New York Night Train nights, Toubin played primarily punk, 1960s garage, psychedelic rock, noise rock, girl groups, surf, Blues, Rockabilly, and country. Gradually, he began incorporating the soul and r&b records that he would later become known for.

Building off of the success of the New York Night Train Wednesdays, Toubin started holding larger dance parties at Glasslands in Williamsburg. These included Happenings at the Live With Animals gallery, a multi-media art project/party, and his Soul Clap And Dance-Off. In 2007, he made the decision to use 45 rpm exclusively in order to elevate the quality of his parties and concentrate more on unique record curation. He went on to produce events all over New York City including Thursday Thump at Enid's, Boogaloo Shampoo at Beauty Bar, Land of a Thousand Dances, the Ya-Ya Yacht parties, and Shaking all Over Sideways and Down at Home Sweet Home.

== Car accident ==
On December 7, 2011, Jonathan arrived in Portland, where he was booked to play the fifth anniversary party of the "I've Got A Hole in my Soul" dance party at club "Rotture". The next morning at approximately 11:00am, a cab driver was struck with a diabetic seizure and drove her taxi through the windowed wall of Toubin's hotel room, landing atop of him as he lay in bed. Four men lifted the stuck car over what was left of the smashed wall to allow a hotel employee to back the car off of Toubin and he was rushed to the Oregon Health & Science University Hospital. He suffered from crushed lungs, twelve broken ribs, a smashed scapula, a broken pelvis, severed tendons in his right arm and hand, a punctured spleen, a damaged pancreas, and loss of hearing in his left ear. While in an induced coma, Toubin went through five surgeries and developed pneumonia the following week. Toubin made a full recovery and was released on January 13, 2012 into a rehabilitation center, where he considered the probability of the end of his life as a DJ.

While in the hospital, a benefit was held for Toubin at the Brooklyn Bowl, where a host of major label acts performed including the Yeah Yeah Yeahs, Gibby Haynes of the Butthole Surfers, and John Spencer's Heavy Trash.

== Return to music ==
In early April, Toubin attempted to DJ again between music sets a Portland club and found himself struggling with his ability to slide records out of their sleeves and with his hearing loss as his hearing aids reduced his ability to mix records. However, as he practiced, he found himself able to mix by focusing on his right ear. He soon found himself back to full capacity and quickly went on to gigs such as opening for Jack White at Webster Hall and in his residency at Home Sweet Home in NYC.

In 2013, Toubin was the first DJ to ever be given an entire evening to himself at Lincoln Center's Midsummer's Night Swing. In the same year, Toubin was the first DJ to be given an official SXSW showcase.

To accommodate his increasing popularity his monthly Soul Clap moved from Glasslands to the larger Brooklyn Bowl. As of 2009, Toubin has partnered with Panache Booking and tours internationally, bringing his Soul Clap to Europe and Australia.

== Sound ==
Toubin's sound emphasizes an aesthetic based on quality vintage sounds that he asserts can only be found on 45" pressings. This leads him to take advantage of the veins of obscure hits, which perhaps may be unknown, yet possess the same dynamics that can energize the dancefloor. This leads him to search for regional obscurities that may not have seen a larger stage in their heyday. In a Rolling Stone interview "The Rust Belt has the best record stores...Cleveland, Toledo, Pittsburgh – Detroit is like a record mecca." Toubin's eschewal of hits and his focus on obscure tracks is also due to his theory that playing more popular songs introduces individual associations to the dance floor and takes away from the newly shared experience that unifies a Soul Clap. Seeing shows at the legendary blues club Antone's contributed to Toubin's understanding and taste in music. In an interview with Greg Beets in the Austin Chronicle, he says:

"Those Antone's blues shows were important for me in high school and college...Particularly the Albert Collins shows and anniversaries with Muddy Waters' band and all of the blues/R&B superstars. Paul Ray's 'Twine Time' show on KUT also hipped me not only to this type of music but the general aesthetic."

Jonathan describes his music as "Rock and Soul 45s of the 1950s and 1960s" Despite the era's tendency for music to have long fade-outs, Toubin aggressively beat-matches his 45s without the assistance of ubiquitous DJ software such as Serato in order to maintain the energy level of his music sets.

Toubin's primary use of the 45 rpm single is not one that he attributes to novelty, telling the Wall Street Journal, ""I used to DJ records, CDs, mp3s and it never sounded good...And then I found a box of great 45s on the street, so I started playing more of them. And I loved the way the 45s sounded. They were so much louder, like a punch in the face."

"Sixties and Seventies 7-inches are recorded, mastered, and pressed unlike anything before or since," Toubin asserts. "Even on one beaten to hell, the tone is so much richer than later reproductions of the same records. On the good ones, the drums resonate as if they're in the room with you." "They learned how to make drums sound huge. They haven't repeated that drum sound much since."

He tells Digital Journal: "You...have to create an atmosphere and a rhythm through a sequence of juxtaposed 2-minute bursts of sound."

To maximize the focus on the party aspect of the music, many of the songs Toubin spins reference a trend in the 1950s and 1960s to highlight a particular dance move named after an animal, such as "The Monkey" or "The Dog."

== New York Night Train ==
New York Night Train initially started off as a record label in 2006 releasing albums until 2009 when Toubin decided to focus his energies on nightlife.

Year	Artist	Album
2006	Kid Congo Powers	Solo Cholo
2006	Grand Mal	Love is the Best Con in Town
2006	Kid Congo Powers and the Pink Monkey Birds	Philosophy and Underwear
2006	Viva l'American Death Ray Music	In the Meantime...
2007	MC Trachiotomy featuring Mr. Quintron	Rowdy Life 12"
2007	S–S-S-Spectres	Sea Potentia Divina
2007	Dimestore Ensemble	Dimestore Ensemble
2008	Witch Hat	Hell Hole
2009	The Stalkers	In Your Streets Today/Feral Children 7″

== Soul Clap and Dance Off ==
In 2007, at one of Toubin's parties, two dancers got into an argument over who was the better dancer. They settled it in front of all on the dancefloor, leading Toubin to dedicate one night a month to a dance contest, while playing exclusively soul music. A prize of $100 goes to each night's winner.

At approximately 1:00am, fifty contestants are chosen and given a number, which is pinned to their back. Five (often celebrity) judges are chosen and sit on the stage and watch as the dancers perform in any style that they please. Judging is non-standardized and is based upon the own individual values of each judge. "Pro dancers rarely win. They're always very disgruntled when they don't. But it's more about style."

Toubin attributes the success of his parties to the fact that they offer a unique musical experience to a broad audience of sub-cultures. Rock and rollers, while familiar with the music, may not be familiar with dance parties. Likewise, club kids and downtown art scenesters, who may be more interested in the dance aspect of the Soul Clap and Dance Off, are introduced to a subjectively new experience. Toubin consciously looks to build a bridge between music scenes through events like Soul Clap, remarking "...art girls and Brooklyn rock boys make a great mix if you can get 'em on the same dance floor."

On February 22, 2014, the first ever National Soul Clap Dance-Off was at Brooklyn Bowl. First-place winners were flown in from around the US to compete for a grand prize of 1,000 dollars with Andrew WK as the contest selector. The Soul Clap party has been the official closer of SXSW in Austin for both 2013 and 2014.

== Mix releases ==
Year	Label	Title
2013	Burger Records	New York Night Train's Ruff Love
2013	Burger Records	New York Night Train's Haunted Hop Halloween Mix Cassette
2014	Norton Records	"Souvenirs of the Soul Clap Vol. 1"
2014	Norton Records	"Souvenirs of the Soul Clap Vol. 2"
2015	Norton Records	"Souvenirs of the Soul Clap Vol. 3"
2015	Norton Records	"Souvenirs of the Soul Clap Vol. 4"
