= Soldiers Pay =

- Directed by: David O. Russell; Tricia Regan; Juan Carlos Zaldívar
- Release date: 2004
- Running time: 35 minutes
- Country: United States
- Language: English

Soldiers Pay is a 2004 documentary short film directed by David O. Russell, Tricia Regan, and Juan Carlos Zaldívar. It takes its name from Soldiers' Pay, a novel by William Faulkner.

In 2004, Warner Bros., feeling that Russell's 1999 film Three Kings, about a gold heist that takes place during the 1991 Iraqi uprising against Saddam Hussein following the end of the Gulf War, had become relevant again due to the Iraq War, decided to re-release it in theaters and on DVD. Having no additional footage to add, Russell instead shot Soldiers Pay, a short documentary about the Iraq War, to accompany the film. Taking its name from William Faulkner's first novel of the same name about an airman's return home in World War I's aftermath, Russell said the documentary examined "both sides of the war, people who feel good about the war, who believe in the mission, people who feel bad."

While making the documentary, Russell spoke with both Iraqis and U.S. troops. Asked how the Iraqis he had interviewed felt about the war, Russell said:

Every Iraqi I know is glad that Saddam is gone. I would completely disagree with Michael Moore about that. I think it's good that Saddam is gone. And I think basically the movie takes the position of, is Iraq better off without Saddam? Yes. Is the world better off with this war? Not sure, don't think so.

Although Russell had planned to release the film before November 2004, hoping to "perhaps make a difference before the election," Warner Bros. abandoned the project at the last minute, citing "controversy surrounding the documentary, combined with a later-than-expected arrival of the bonus footage". Russell disputed the time-crunch excuse, saying "I think if they really wanted to they could make it happen." Eventually, the documentary was purchased by the Independent Film Channel, where it was aired in its entirety the night before the 2004 U.S. presidential election.
