= Speed Is Dreaming =

Studio album by St. Johnny
- Released: 1994
- Studio: Oz Recording Studios, Baltimore, Maryland, United States
- Genre: Alternative rock
- Length: 45:49
- Language: English
- Label: DGC
- Producer: St. Johnny

St. Johnny chronology
| High as a Kite (1993) | Speed Is Dreaming (1994) | Let It Come Down (1995) |

Speed Is Dreaming is the sophomore studio album by American alternative rock band St. Johnny and their first release for DGC Records.

== Reception ==
Editors at AllMusic Guide rated this album four out of five stars, with critic Nitsuh Abebe opining that the band retained their characteristic melodic compositions, but having a major record label "cleans up some of the band's sound and tightens their songwriting". Andrew Earles highlighted the band's previous debut album High as a Kite in Gimme Indie Rock: 500 Essential American Underground Rock Albums 1981-1996 and also called this album "near-excellent". A review in Billboard, noting that the "D.I.Y. spirit" is still present in the band's major-label debut. In an overview of the band's career for Trouser Press, Deborah Sprague notes that Speed Is Dreaming improves on the band's independent work and praises the interplay of Tom Leonard's layered guitar along with Bill Whitten's vocals.

== Track listing ==
1. "A Car or a Boy" (Jim Elliott, Wayne Letitia, and Bill Whitten) – 4:00
2. "I Hate Rock & Roll" (Elliott, Tom Leonard, Letitia, and Whitten) – 3:13
3. "Down the Drain" (Elliott, Leonard, Letitia, and Whitten) – 3:11
4. "I Give Up" (Elliott, Letitia, and Whitten) – 3:19
5. "What Was I Supposed to See" (Elliott, Leonard, and Whitten) – 2:54
6. "The Devil's Last Stand" (Elliott, Letitia, and Whitten) – 5:07
7. "You're Not My Friend" (Elliott, Letitia, and Whitten) – 0:16
8. "You Can't Win" (Elliott, Letitia, and Whitten) – 4:29
9. "Gran Mal" (Elliott, Letitia, and Whitten) – 3:00
10. "Everything Is Beautiful" (Leonard and Whitten) – 3:23
11. "Black Eye" (Elliott, Letitia, and Whitten) – 4:42
12. "Turbine" (Elliott, Letitia, and Whitten) – 4:58
13. "Stupid" (Elliott, Tom Leonard, Letitia, and Whitten) – 3:17

== Personnel ==
St. Johnny

- Jim Elliott – bass guitar, guitar, piano, production
- Tom Leonard – guitar, Moog synthesizer, vocals, production
- Wayne Letitia – drums, cymbals, bass drum, snare drum, percussion, production
- Bill Whitten – guitar, sound effects, vocals, production

Additional personnel

- John Agnello – mixing
- Steve Palmieri – engineering

== See also ==
- List of 1994 albums
