= Puzzlehead =

- Theatrical release poster
- Directed by: James Bai
- Written by: James Bai
- Produced by: James Bai; Stephen Bai; Jason Kraut
- Starring: Stephen Galaida; Robbie Shapiro; Mark Janis
- Cinematography: Jeffery Scott Lando
- Edited by: Miranda Devin
- Music by: Max Avery Lichtenstein
- Release dates: April 21, 2005 (Tribeca Film Festival); March 23, 2006 (United States)
- Running time: 81 minutes
- Country: United States
- Language: English

Puzzlehead is a 2005 American science fiction thriller film starring Stephen Galaida, Robbie Shapiro, and Mark Janis. It was written and directed by James Bai and the film debuted at the Tribeca Film Festival on April 21, 2005 before opening in limited release in New York City on March 23, 2006.

== Plot ==
Walter, a scientist living in a dark world where technology has been outlawed, secretly works to create a self-aware android in his own likeness. This android, named Puzzlehead by Walter, acts as the scientist's companion and his connection to the outside world; all the time developing his own personality and self-awareness in the manner of a learning child. The android and his maker turn against one another when Puzzlehead pursues Julia, a woman who does not know Walter has feelings for her.

== Awards and nominations ==
- ‘Puzzlehead’ Won the Jury Award for Best Special Effects at the Austin Fantastic Festival.

== Cast ==
- Stephen Galaida - Puzzlehead/Walter
- Robbie Shapiro - Julia
- Mark Janis

== Filming locations ==
- Brooklyn, New York

== Reception ==
The film has a 100% rating on Rotten Tomatoes based on 7 reviews.
