= Shari Frilot =

American film director (born 1965)

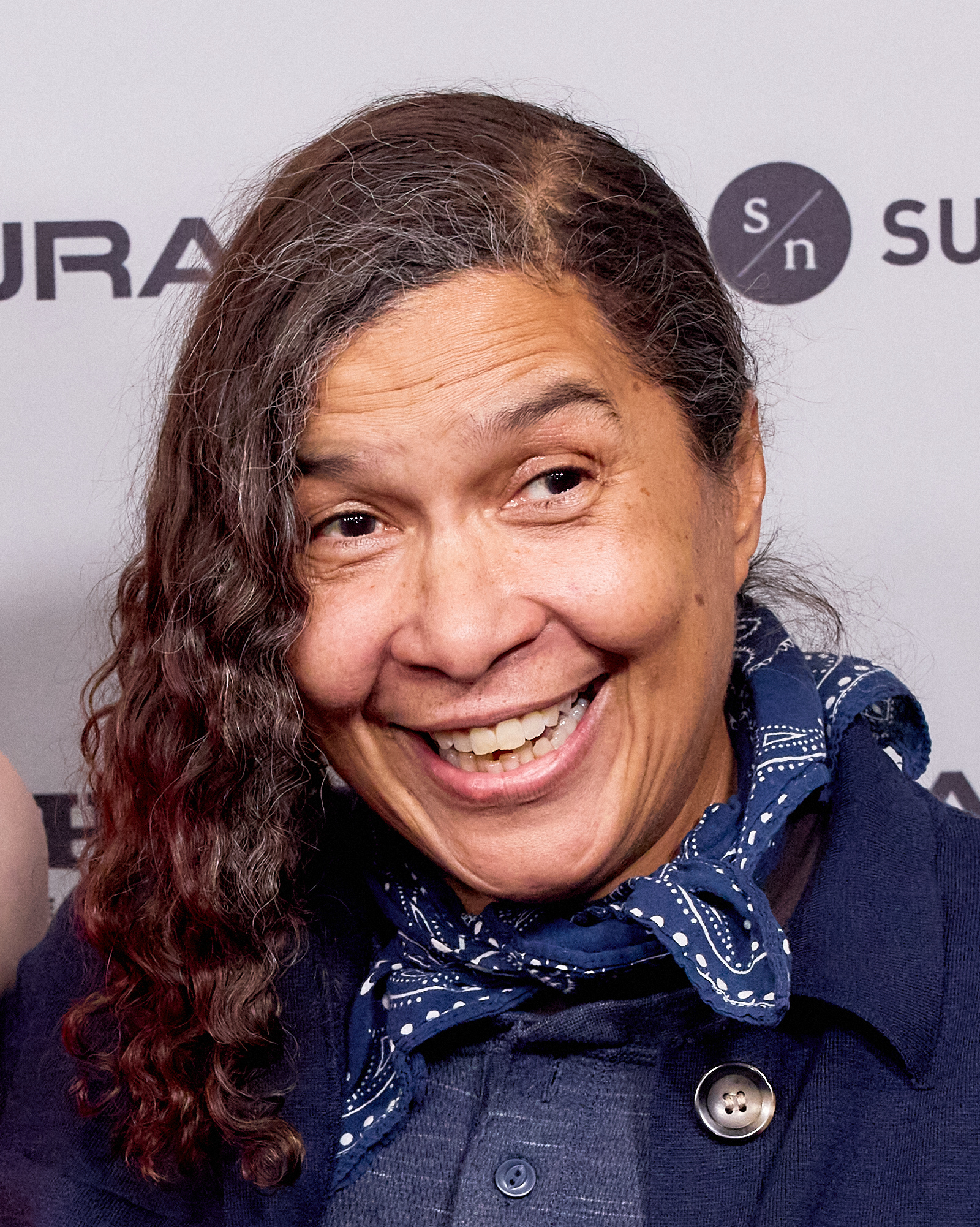
- Frilot in 2026
- Born: June 18, 1965 (age 61)
- Occupations: Artist; filmmaker
- Awards: Peabody Award (2022)

Shari Frilot (born June 18, 1965) is an artist, filmmaker, and chief curator of the New Frontier program at the Sundance Film Festival. She is the director of two short films (Fly Boy, 1989 and Strange & Charmed, 2003), and one documentary feature (Black Nations/Queer Nations?, 1995). Frilot has been chief curator of the New Frontier program since 2007, where she leads programming of new experimental American film and has developed an exhibition space at the Sundance Film Festival which hosts "digital artworks, media installations, and multimedia performance," including cinematic and artistic projects that make use of virtual reality technology. In her role as chief curator of New Frontier, the integration of new technologies has included an international open call for VR-based projects, integration of haptic technologies, and the platforming of projects that made use of artificial intelligence in their creation. Frilot has described the work of New Frontier by saying, "We wanted to cultivate an artistic and social environment to disarm people when they entered the space. It was a way of unlocking inhibitions and encouraging audiences to think about opening themselves up to the new rules and cinematic suggestions which the New Frontier artists are inviting you to consider."

Her interests as a curator and a filmmaker are informed by her early experiences within a creative community of queer artists of color. Alongside documentary filmmakers like Marlon Riggs, Cheryl Dunye, and Isaac Julien, Frilot was part of a generation of African-American directors whose work explicitly addressed issues of racial and sexual identity in the last two decades of twentieth century. From 1992 to 1996, she served as Director of the gay and lesbian experimental film festival MIX festival in New York City, where she also co-founded the first gay Latin American subsidiary film festivals, MIX BRASIL and MIX MEXICO. She also served as co-director of Programming for OUTFEST from 1998 to 2001, where she founded the festival's Platinum Oasis, which introduced cinematic performance installation and performance to the festival for the first time. In 2010, she was a featured speaker at the University of California, Berkeley's Art, Technology, and Culture Colloquium, where she presented a talk entitled "The Power of the Erotic: Curatorial Strategies at Sundance's New Frontier."

== Accolades ==
- 2022: Peabody Award - Visionary Award within the Immersive & Interactive category.
