= Marc Swadel =

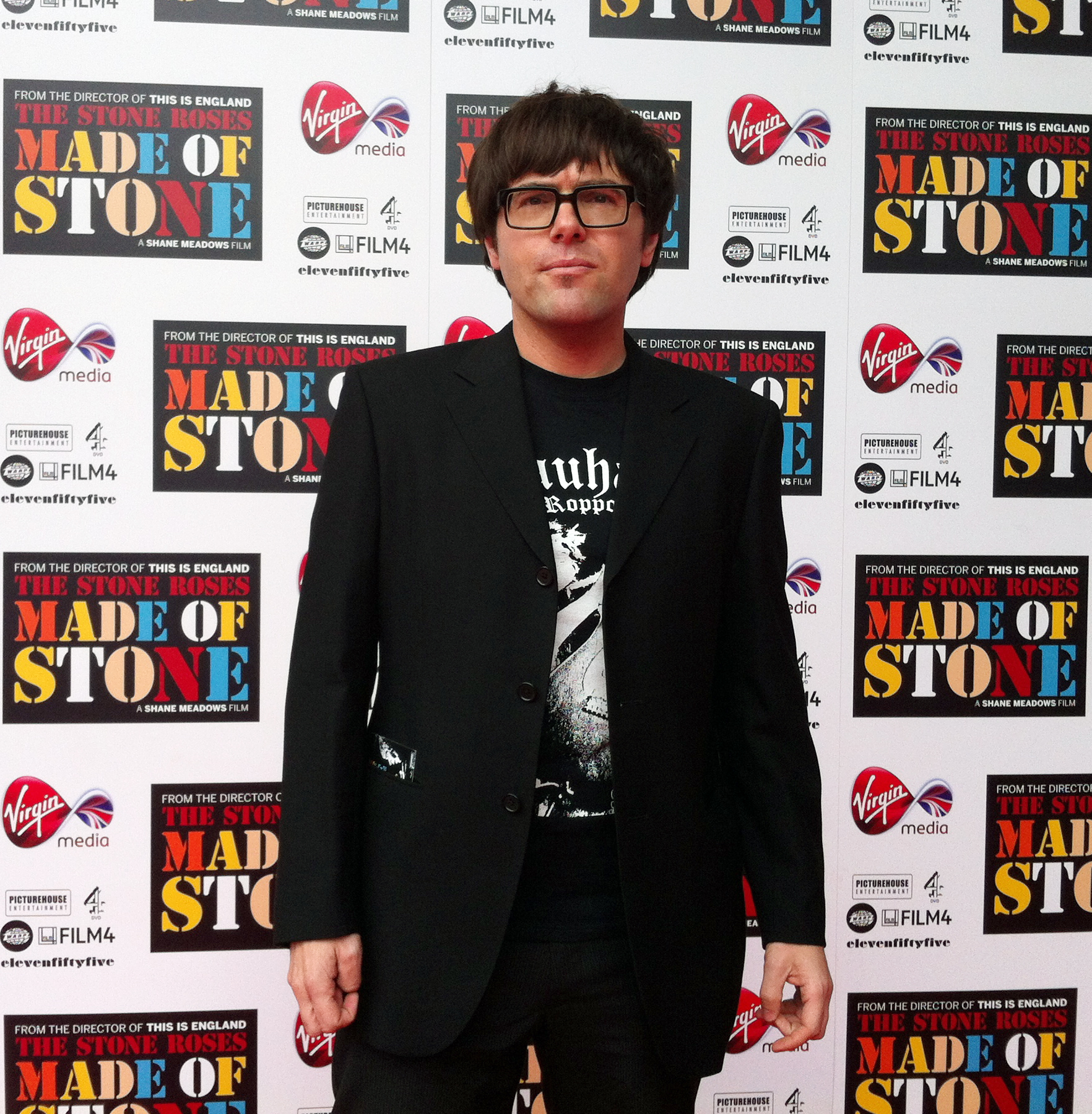
Marc Swadel at world premiere of The Stone Roses:Made of Stone, Manchester May 2013.

Marc Swadel is a New Zealand film director, cinematographer, writer and producer. He is most well known for his music based output, spanning TV, music promo and feature film. As a feature film cinematographer, Marc has shot many features including:

The Stone Roses: Made of Stone 2013 (Dir. Shane Meadows / Warp Films). Marc was DOP for the Japan shoot for this rock and roll doco-feature. (Key Cinematographer Laurie Rose)

The Chemical Brothers Grammy nominated Japanese concert film Don't Think 2012 (Dir. Adam Smith RSA Films / Black Dog) which was the first film recorded in 7.1 Audio, and was seen on the big screen in 30 countries. The film also won for 'Best Live Music Coverage' at the 2012 UK Music Video Awards.

Korean language drama Desert (Dir. Stephen Kang, Severe Features/Curious Films) 2010 which was the first completed HDSLR feature in the southern hemisphere, had its debut at 'A' list festival Busan, Korea, and had a theatrical run in New Zealand.

English rock concert bricolage All Tomorrows Parties 2009, (Dir. Jonathan Caouette / Warp Films / Found Films) had a cinema release in both the UK and Australia, and was shown at over 50 festivals.

Marc also lensed (along with Key Cinematographer Ginny Loane ) Stephen Kang's short film Blue which won the Grand Prix, Semaine De La Critique at Cannes in 2011.

In Television Marc has produced, directed and shot two series of Rockfeedback TV for MTV networks Europe and Channel 4 UK (2005/6) which aired in 18 territories. Marc has also toured with the Foo Fighters, Frank Black, Ed Harcourt, Serafin, Eagles of Deathmetal, Liam Finn and The Drones.

Marc has directed live shoots and/or music videos for over 300 bands, including Gary Numan, Portishead, Liars, Gossip, Einstürzende Neubauten, Devo, Sonic Youth, Gang of Four, The Fall, Teenage Fanclub, Grinderman, Dirty Three, Nick Cave, Iggy and the Stooges, Libertines, Battles, The Residents, Clint Ruin, Silver Apples, Rowland S. Howard, The 3Ds, The Clean, Connan Mockasin, Bailterspace, Mudhoney, Dinosaur Jr, Sebadoh, Yeah Yeah Yeahs, Pavement, Liam Finn, and The Cramps.

His directorial output also includes commercials and short film - Marc was chosen for the Saatchi & Saatchi New Directors Showcase at Cannes in 2003 with the Visa Dirty Money cinema commercial, and the Supercollider series of 35mm digital animations made with brother Paul Swadel were selected for the Clermont Ferrand, Berlin, and Video Brasil festivals, and won the Premio Ultravisoni Award at the Ostia Film Festival in 2010.
