= Juan Carlos Zaldívar =

Cuban-American film maker

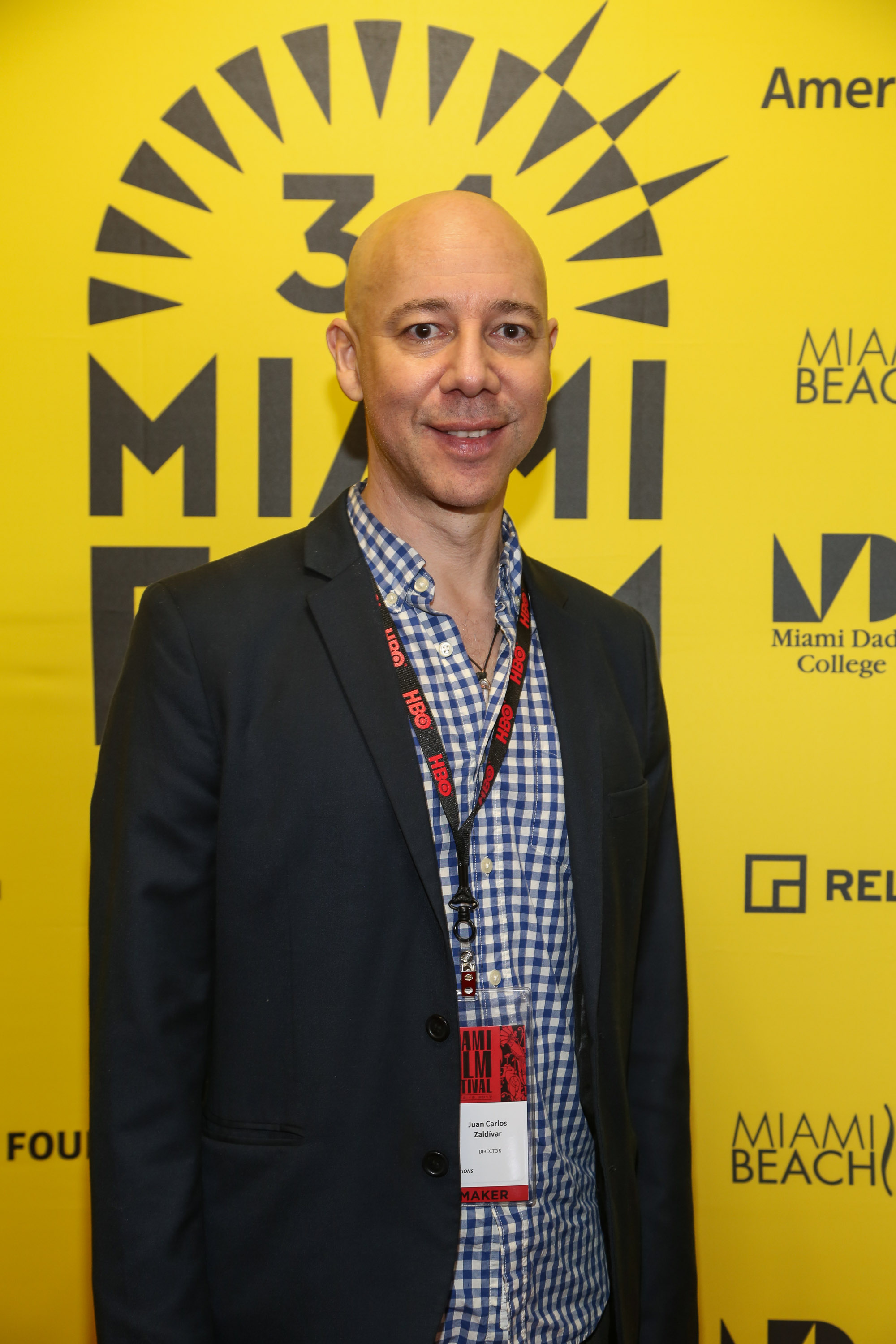
Zaldivar at the 2017 Miami International Film Festival showing of Alterations (Love is the Answer Vol. 1 - Shorts Program)

Juan Carlos Zaldívar is a filmmaker and video artist who was born in Cuba. Zaldivar has lived in the United States of America since 1980 with directing credits including "90 Miles", which aired nationally on PBS/"P.O.V.", and was featured in the book Mining the Home Movie: Excavations in Histories and Memories.

Zaldivar also co-directed "Soldiers Pay" with Tricia Regan and "David O. Russell" as well as several award-winning short films, including the trailers for the "Sundance International Film Festival". Zaldivar has taught as an adjunct faculty member at New York University, Miami International University of Art & Design, The New York Film Academy, Miami Dade College, and is a Professor at State University of New York at Buffalo. Zaldivar completed both his BFA and a Masters of Fine Arts at New York University's Tisch School of the Arts, and also taught as adjunct faculty there.

Zaldivar started a film career as a sound editor and designer, and worked in Academy Nominated films such as Ang Lee's "Sense and Sensibility;" "On the ropes" and on HBO’s America Undercover, which garnered an Emmy nomination for Zaldivar.

Zaldivar has had video art works screened at many festivals worldwide and broadcast on PBS, ABC, IFC, Showtime and WE and has received numerous grants and awards; served as a Juror for several mayor film festivals including the Sundance International Film Festival and is a Sundance Film Institute alumnus.

Zaldivar recently tenured with Doc Society (previously Britdoc Foundation) as the Outreach Director for Good Pitch Miami 2017; associate produced the theatrical feature doc "Buena Vista Social Club, Adios"; co-produced the VR film "A history of Cuban dance" (Sundance & SXSW 2016); is directing a second VR doc entitled "SwampScapes" with Elizabeth Miller and Kim Grinfeder and is producing Phonograph Films' first fiction feature film with development support from "La Biennale di Venezia College Cinema" at the Venice Film Festival.
