= Grand Mal (New York City band) =

American rock band (active 1995–2010)

- Origin: New York City, New York, United States
- Genres: Alternative rock
- Years active: 1995-2010
- Labels: No.6 Records, Slash/London Records, Arena Rock Recording Co., New York Night Train and Groover Recordings
- Members: Bill Whitten; Parker Kindred; Dave Sherman; Tom Goss; Phil Schuster; John deVries; J Bryan Bowden; Steve Borgerding; Jonathan Toubin; Michael Gerner; Aaron Romanello; Chris Isom; Nate Brown; Steven Mertens; Mark Ephraim; Sara Press; Mike Fadem; Kevin Thaxton; Justin Russo; Mike Robertson; Jeff Bailey

Grand Mal was an American rock band, formed by Bill Whitten in New York City in 1995 and has recorded for No.6 Records, Slash/London Records, Arena Rock Recording Co., New York Night Train and Groover Recordings.

== Members ==
- Bill Whitten-guitar, vocals, keyboards 1995–2010
- Tom Goss - drums 1995-1997
- Phil Schuster-bass 1995-1997
- John deVries-lead guitar 1995-1999
- J Bryan Bowden-drums 1997-1998
- Steve Borgerding-bass, lead guitar 1997-2003
- Parker Kindred-drums 1998-2010
- Jonathan Toubin-keyboards, bass 1998-2004
- Michael Gerner-bass 1999-2002
- Aaron Romanello-lead guitar 2003-2004
- Chris Isom-lead guitar 2003-2006
- Nate Brown-keyboards 2003-2005
- Dave Sherman-keyboards 2004-2010
- Steven Mertens-bass 2004-2006
- Mark Ephraim-lead guitar 2004-2005
- Sara Press-bass 2004-2005
- Mike Fadem-drums 2006-2009
- Kevin Thaxton-bass 2006-2009
- Justin Russo-keyboards 2004-2005
- Jason Russo-guitars 2003–2010
- Mike Robertson-lead guitar 2006-2009
- Jeff Bailey-bass 2006-2009

== Discography ==
=== EP’s ===
- Grand Mal (No. 6) 1996

=== Full-Length ===
- Pleasure Is No Fun (CD/LP) (No. 6) 1997
- Maledictions (CD) (Slash/London) 1999
- Bad Timing (CD) (Arena Rock) 2003
- Love Is The Best Con in Town (New York Night Train) 2006
- Congratulations You’ve Re-joined the Human Race (Groover Recordings) 2007
- Clandestine Songs (Groover Recordings) TBR April 7, 2010

=== Tracks Appear On ===
- “Stay in Bed” Jawbreaker (film): Music from the Motion Picture (London) 1999
- “Hey Man” This is Next Year: A Brooklyn-Based Compilation (Arena Rock) 2001
- Jean and Cover: A Compilation (Groover Recordings) 2005
- The World Turns all Around Him: A Compilation (Groover Recordings) 2006
- 50 Minutes: A Compilation (Exercise1 Recordings) 2006
