= Let It Come Down (St. Johnny album) =

Studio album by St. Johnny
- Released: 1995
- Studios: Sweetfish Studios, Argyle, New York, United States
- Genre: Alternative rock
- Length: 50:38
- Language: English
- Label: DGC
- Producers: Dave Fridmann; Bill Whitten

St. Johnny chronology
Speed is Dreaming (1994)	Let It Come Down (1995)

Let It Come Down is the third and final studio album by American alternative rock band St. Johnny.

== Reception ==
Editors at AllMusic Guide rated this album four out of five stars, with critic Tim DiGravina comparing this music unfavorably to Mercury Rev and Pavement, claiming that there is "not much innovation or improvement when the songs are compared to the band's peers". In an overview of the band's career for Trouser Press, Deborah Sprague considers the change from Tom Leonard to Jim Roberts a step down for the band's sound and considers Let It Come Down "the aural equivalent of trying to cross the Atlantic in a Volvo". Cherly Botchick of CMJ New Music Monthly noted the band's unique style and sound, opining that they had been underappreciated, but now have an opportunity to get a larger audience with this release.

== Track listing ==
1. "Scuba Diving" (Jim Elliott, Dave Fridmann, Tom Goss, Jim Roberts, and Bill Whitten) – 3:36
2. "Just When I Had It Under Control" (Whitten) – 4:54
3. "Bluebird" (Elliott, Goss, Roberts, and Whitten) – 3:02
4. "Pin the Tail on the Donkey" (Whitten) – 6:16
5. "Hey Teenager!" (Whitten) – 3:52
6. "Rip Off" (Roberts and Whitten) – 1:37
7. "Deliver Me" (Roberts and Whitten) – 4:14
8. "Fast, Cheap and Out of Control" (Roberts and Whitten) – 4:00
9. "After Dark" (Whitten) – 2:41
10. "Wild Goose Chasing" (Whitten) – 3:03
11. "Do You Wanna Go Out?" (Roberts and Whitten) – 5:04
12. "Million Dollar Bet" (Whitten) – 4:23
13. "Salvation Arm" (Whitten) – 3:56

== Personnel ==
St. Johnny

- Jim Elliott – bass guitar, organ, piano, backing vocals
- Tommy Goss – drums, percussion, backing vocals
- Jim Roberts – acoustic guitar, electric guitar, vocals
- Bill Whitten – guitar, whistling, vocals, production

Additional personnel

- Julie Baker – violin, backing vocals
- Dave Fridmann – castanets, choir/chorus, clavinet, engineering, Fender Rhodes, mastering, Mellotron, piano, production, vocals
- Grasshopper – glass, oboe, sampling, saxophone, vocals, backing vocals, assistant engineering
- Micky Mercurio – vocals
- Frank Olinsky – design
- Joe Roberts – harmonica, slide guitar
- Billy Schmidt – assistant engineering, vocals
- Nitin Vadukul – photography

== See also ==
- List of 1995 albums
