= Arlene's Grocery =

Bar and music venue in Manhattan, New York

Coordinates: 40°43′16.5″N 73°59′18″W

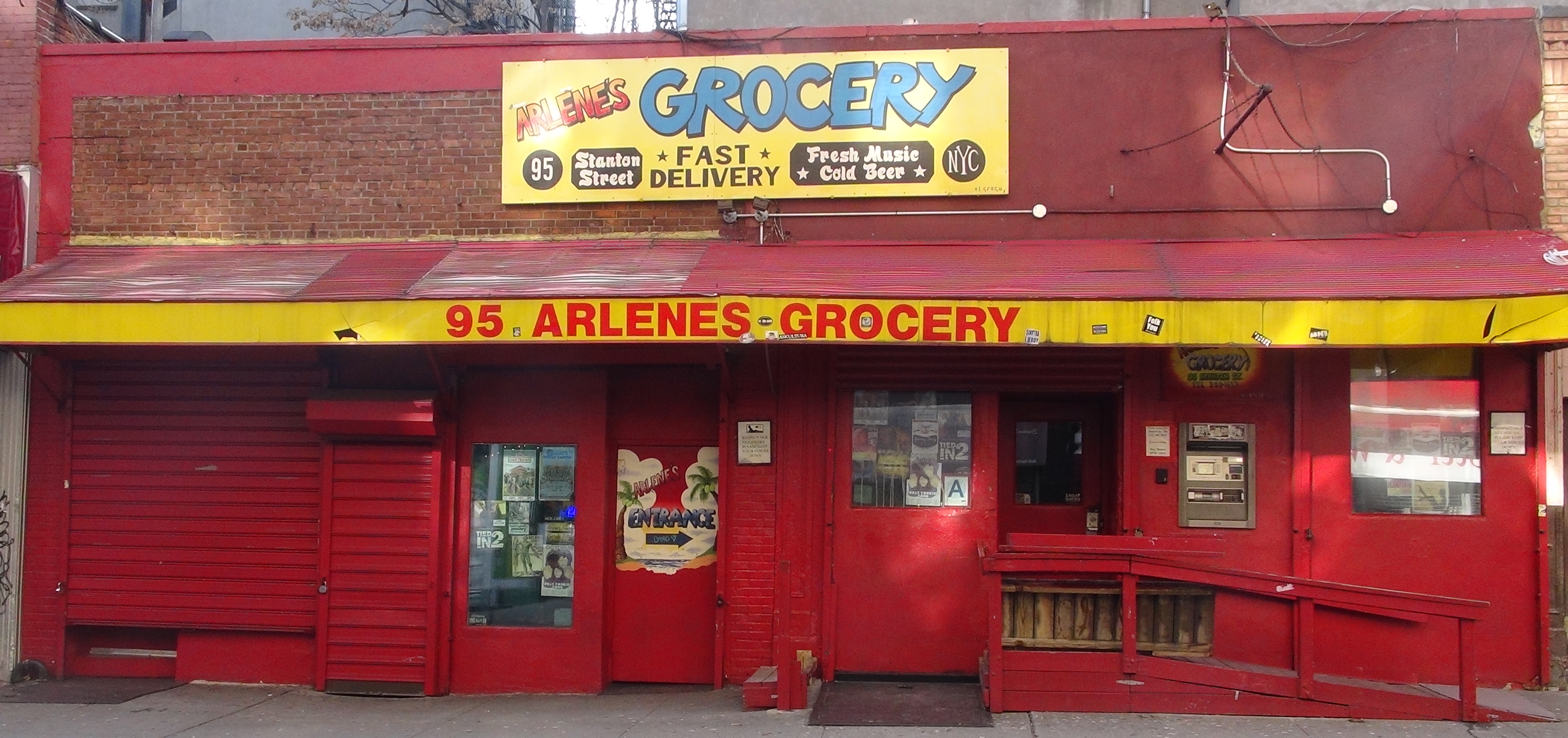
- Arlene's Grocery in 2011
- Interactive map of Arlene's Grocery
- Address: 95 Stanton Street
- Location: Lower East Side, Manhattan, New York 10001
- Seating type: Standing
- Capacity: 150

Construction
- Opened: 1995

Website
- www.arlenesgrocerynyc.com

Arlene's Grocery is a bar and music venue located on the Lower East Side of Manhattan. It is located at 95 Stanton Street between Orchard St and Ludlow St. The venue was opened by Shane Doyle and two partners in 1995. Shane Doyle was also owner and founder of Sin-é. While Shane was bought out early on, the two remaining partners run the club.

== History ==
The former Puerto Rican bodega (the facade of which remains) and neighboring butcher shop were converted into a bar in 1995. It hosts a variety of musical acts, although punk and hard rock bands tend to be most common. Local acts usually play at the venue, while their slightly "hipster" clientele often stay within the confines of the separate bar area.

In the early 2000s, the venue hosted a popular all-ages matinee on Saturday afternoons, which was created and hosted by Lower East Side glam-punk band The Act.
