= The Silent League =

American post-rock, chamber pop band

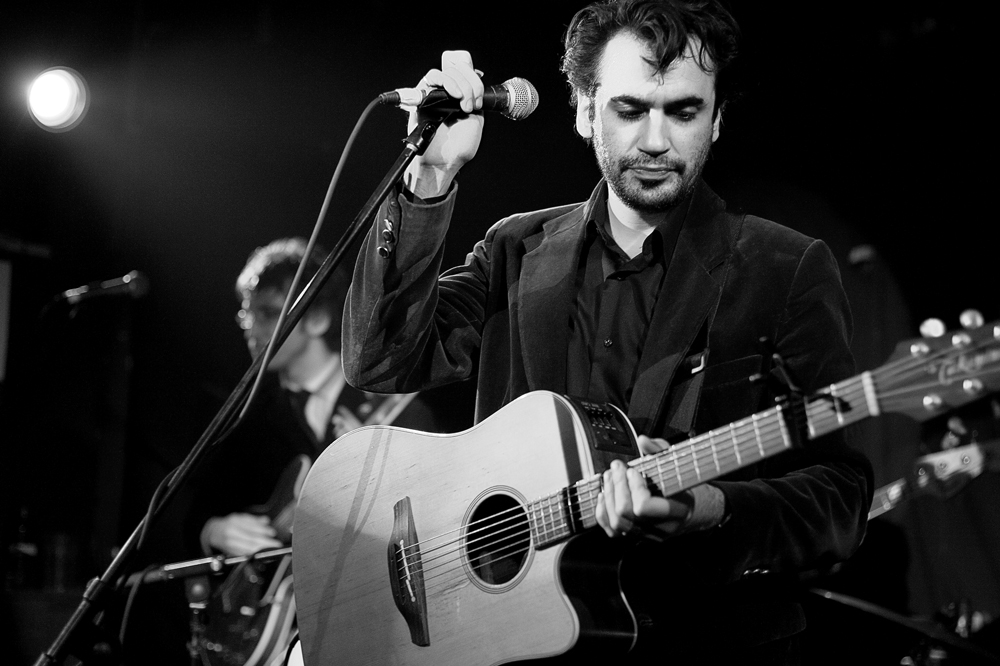
- The Silent League at The Barfly Club, Camden, London, UK. February 2005.

Background information
- Origin: Brooklyn, New York, U.S.
- Genres: Post rock, Chamber pop, Indie
- Labels: File-13, Something in Construction, Rallye/Klee
- Members: Justin Russo, Shannon Fields, Kevin Thaxton, Jesse Blum, and Danny Lockwood.
- Past members: Ryan Smith, Phil Williams, Reno Bo, Jason Russo, Sam Fogerino, Sean Mackowiak, Gene Park, Kelly Pratt, Jon Natchez, Evan Pazner, James Duncan.
- Website: http://www.silentleague.com

The Silent League is an American post-rock, chamber pop band from Brooklyn, New York, founded by Justin Russo, formerly of Mercury Rev. Their 2004 debut, The Orchestra, Sadly, Has Refused, featuring Sam from Interpol, Grasshopper from the Rev and a cast of dozens, was released in the US on Chicago's File-13 label, and in the UK in late 2005, on Something In Construction.

== Career ==
The band's debut release, led to quick success and sales, abetted by a number of high-profile shows with Interpol, Bloc Party, Echo & The Bunnymen, Keane, Brendan Benson, Rufus Wainwright, Sufjan Stevens. The newly boosted profile of such an orchestral band led to members being "borrowed" to collaborate on records by (and play on tours with) Beirut, Arcade Fire, Bishop Allen, Harlem Shakes, Stars Like Fleas, Antony & the Johnsons, Calexico.

Their follow-up album entitled Of Stars And Other Somebodies was released in 2007. Tracks include Victim of Aeroplane, Kings & Queens and Let It Roll. The band (now touring as a six-piece—a lither, synthier, explosive-er live band) embarked on their fourth UK tour, a 15+ date promo trip, performing across the UK and at festivals including Godiva (mainstage with Super Furry Animals, The Cribs, The Enemy ), Latitude Festival (with Arcade Fire, Jarvis Cocker, The National, and Final Fantasy), the DrownedInSound and Truck Festivals, as well as doing BBC radio sessions and much press. Late 2007 saw Japanese release on Rallye/Klee label (Au Revoir Simone, Yacht, Klaxons, Matt & Kim)

The band's third album But You've Always Been the Caretaker was released January 2010 on Something In Construction records. With producer, and band-member, Shannon Fields at the helm, the band spent time at various upstate farmhouse studios with recording and mixing engineer D. James Goodwin crafting somewhat of a stylistic departure from their previous albums.

In May 2011, The Silent League released a new remix album, We Go Forward, a collection of Silent League tracks remixed electronic artists. The compilation includes remixes by Neon Indian, Memory Tapes, ARMS, and also includes a live fan favourite – a cover of Broken Social Scene's "Texico Bitches".

After eight years without any new releases, in 2020, they released a new single, "Some Things Go Missing", along with the B-side, "First Train".

== Discography ==
=== Albums ===
- The Orchestra, Sadly, Has Refused (File-13, Something in Construction, 2004)
- Of Stars and Other Somebodies (Something in Construction, Rallye/Klee, 2007)
- But You’ve Always Been The Caretaker (Something in Construction, 2010)
- We Go Forward (Something in Construction, 2011)

=== Compilations and soundtracks ===
- Soak Your Shoes in Red Wine (Grand Theft Autumn, 2003)

=== EPs and singles ===
- "The Catbird Seat" / "How?" (Desolation Records, 2004 Single)
- "The Catbird Seat" / "69CORP Dubmix "(Something in Construction, 2005 Single)
- "Goliath" (Something in Construction, 2005 Single)
- "Live at the Seaside Lounge, Volume One" (Tin Drum Records, 2006 EP)
- "Some Things Go Missing" / "First Train" (Something In Construction, 2020 Single)
