= Justin Russo =

American singer-songwriter

Justin Russo (born June 30, 1976) is an American singer-songwriter from Upstate New York. He began his career as a musician at the age of 18 by joining his older brother's band Hopewell, which focused mainly on psychedelic rock balladry and lengthy "shoegazing" soundscapes. After releasing their first record Contact on Burnt Hair Records, both brothers took a break from their own project and joined indie/experimental band Mercury Rev.

After leaving Mercury Rev in 2001, Russo continued with his brother in the making of several more Hopewell records before leaving to form his own band The Silent League in 2003. During that time he also played and recorded with two New York based bands Timesbold and Grand Mal.

He continues to make records with The Silent League at this time.

== Discography ==
=== Albums ===
- Hopewell Contact (Burnt Hair Records, 1996)
- Grasshopper and the Golden Crickets The Orbit of Eternal Grace (Beggars Banquet, 1998)
- Hopewell The Purple Balloon EP (Priapus, 1999)
- Mercury Rev All is Dream (V2 Records, 2001)
- Hopewell The Curved Glass (Priapus, 2001)
- Grand Mal Bad Timing (Arena Rock, 2003)
- The Silent League The Orchestra, Sadly, Has Refused (File-13, Something in Construction, 2004)
- Hopewell Hopewell & The Birds of Appetite (Tee Pee Records, 2005)
- Grand Mal Love is the Best Con in Town (New York Night Train, 2006)
- The Silent League Of Stars and Other Somebodies (Something in Construction, Rallye/Klee, 2007)
- The Silent League But You've Always Been the Caretaker (Something in Construction, 2010)
- The Silent League We Go Forward (Something in Construction, 2011)
