= Jonathan Caouette =

American film director

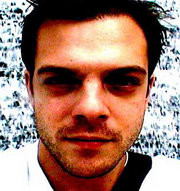
- Born: Houston, Texas, U.S.
- Occupations: Director, producer, film editor, writer

Jonathan Caouette is an American film director, writer, editor and actor.

== Early life and education ==
Caouette's mother was mentally ill and frequently institutionalized. He never knew his father, being raised between his mother, grandparents and foster homes. He was raised as a reformed Jew. He attended Westbury High School in Houston, Texas from 1987 to 1990 where he was bullied regularly for his effeminacy.

== Career ==
=== Directing ===
Caouette is best known as the director and editor of Tarnation (2003), an autobiographical essay documentary that premiered at the Sundance and Cannes film festivals in 2003, and the director of All Tomorrow's Parties about the cult music festival. Caouette has also directed the experimental short film All Flowers in Time and the feature documentary Walk Away Renee. The latter was produced by Agnes B and premiered at the 2011 Cannes Film Festival. In 2009, Caouette served as a creative advisor for director Matthew Mishory's film, Delphinium: A Childhood Portrait of Derek Jarman.

He has described Tarnation as an attempt to give his disorder filmic form. Of the film, he said:

It was a completely organic process based on these unusual, psychological experiences I've had in my adult life—these strange, trancelike experiences, similar to sensations I remember from childhood when I had a very high fever. Where I'm half asleep and half awake, just on the cusp of dreamland. And right as I'm about to conk out, this whole plethora of information comes from my own awareness and rushes into my mind's eye. It's like a story, or a poem, or a series of images...It only makes sense for a moment and then it dissipates. It's like this weird waking dream. I wanted to lucidly mimic that in the form of a film and transpose it cinematically. Soon after I met John [ Cameron Mitchell ] and I had auditioned for his film Shortbus. I had to break away from everything in New York to go rescue my mother in Texas where my grandfather was, one could say, inadvertently allowing her to overdose on lithium. I had to go out there to be their saving grace. After I nursed her to health. I brought her back to New York with me, documenting everything. When I came back, I met this guy who was an intern at the MIX Film Festival. I showed him about 45 minutes of the film I had been making, which had three working titles at the time. "Lucid," "The Day I Disappeared" and "Tarnation," and he said, "Whatever this is, you should finish it because there's a deadline for this film festival coming up in three weeks." So I took my vacation from Mikimotos, where I was working as a door-man, and I went on this crazy editing marathon and got the film in right in the nick of time. I got it into the hands of the then festival director, Stephen Winter, who is also really good friends with John Cameron Mitchell, and that's how everything exploded.

=== Acting ===
Caouette had a major role in the 2006 film Fat Girls and the film Portland, scheduled for pre-production in 2012. He also appeared in Shortbus, directed by John Cameron Mitchell and in the German documentary Wie ich lernte die Zahlen zu lieben/ How I Learned to Love the Numbers about OCD by Oliver Sechting & Max Taubert.

== Personal life ==
Caouette has a son, Josh, who was featured in the 2008 documentary Bi the Way. Caouette is gay and lives with his husband David in New York City.

== Films ==
Films directed by Caouette:

- Tarnation (2003)
- All Tomorrow's Parties (2009)
- All Flowers in Time (2010, short)
- Walk Away Renee (2011)
