= Hopewell (band) =

American rock band

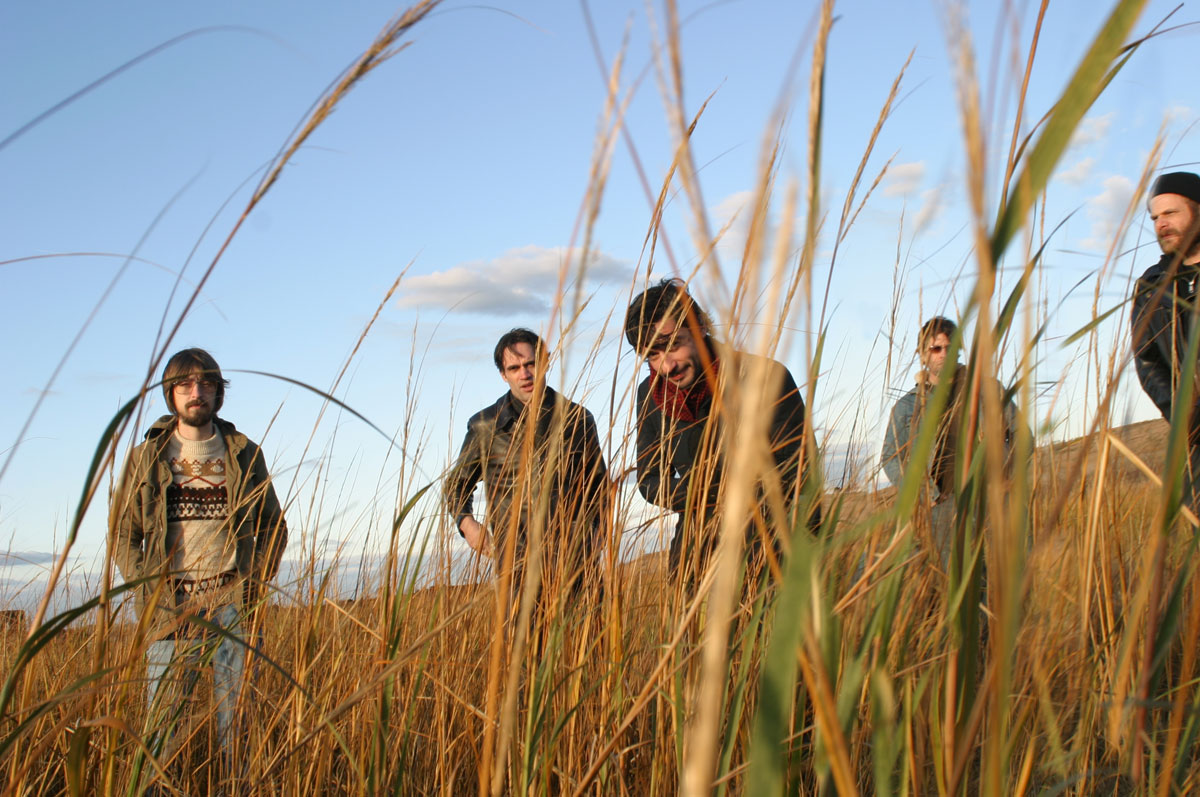
- Hopewell, in Staten Island, New York in 2008

Background information
- Origin: Hopewell Junction, New York; Brooklyn, New York, United States
- Genre: Psychedelic rock
- Labels: Tee Pee Records, Star Mole (Japan), Burnt Hair, Priapus, Sunnylane
- Members: Jason Russo; Jay Green; Rich Meyer; Tyson Lewis; Lyndon Roeller
- Past members: Justin Russo; Dalia Garih; Reno Bo; Phil Williams; Marc Boudria
- Website: Official Website

Hopewell is an American rock band. The band was founded by Jason Sebastian Russo, of Hopewell Junction, New York. At 19, Russo joined Mercury Rev, and then struck out on his own with a band named after his hometown.

== Career ==
=== History ===
In 1995, seminal Detroit-based space rock label Burnt Hair Records released the band's first single, a split with Michigan-based drone-ambient group Windy & Carl. Hopewell's first full-length, Contact, came out on Burnt Hair in 1997. Their second release, 2001's The Curved Glass, led to European distribution, festival appearances and a John Peel session. What followed was a transition period of line-up and stylistic changes. Most notable was the loss of Dalia Garih as drummer. After regrouping, the band signed to Tee Pee Records and released Hopewell & The Birds Of Appetite, produced by Dave Fridmann of Flaming Lips fame at Tarbox Road Studios. Its follow-up, Beautiful Targets, produced by Fridmann protégé Bill Racine, was released in 2007 and its symphonic rock leanings were often compared to Mercury Rev and the Flaming Lips.

The band's 2009 release, Good Good Desperation, took them in a heavier direction, aligned by critics with Pink Floyd's Meddle and Can's Tago Mago.

A selective list of bands Hopewell has performed or toured with: My Bloody Valentine, Sonic Youth, Brian Jonestown Massacre, The Dandy Warhols, Nicole Atkins, The Sleepy Jackson, British Sea Power, The Comas, The Black Angels, Goldrush, Mark Gardener, Mike Watt, The Posies, The Lovetones, Garth Hudson, Adam Franklin, The Joy Formidable, Black Rebel Motorcycle Club and others.

In 2009, Hopewell was tapped to perform at All Tomorrow's Parties, curated by psych-rock superstars, The Flaming Lips. Performers on the bill included The Flaming Lips, Sufjan Stevens, The Jesus Lizard, No Age with Bob Mould performing Hüsker Dü, Super Furry Animals, Animal Collective, Iron & Wine, Panda Bear, Dirty Three with Nick Cave, Suicide, The Feelies, The Drones, David Cross, Deerhunter, Melvins, Boss Hog, El-P, Dead Meadow, Akron/Family, Sleepy Sun, Black Dice, Antipop Consortium, Autolux, Atlas Sound, Bridezilla, Shellac, Grouper and Circulatory System, Boredoms, Caribou Vibration Ensemble, Deerhoof with Martha Colburn, Crystal Castles, Boris, The Low Lows, Oneida, Black Moth Super Rainbow, Menomena and Birds of Avalon.

=== Film and TV ===
Hopewell's music has appeared on the soundtracks for films including Tarnation and PsychoGuru (Tribeca Film Festival selection 2011), and television shows including One Tree Hill and Greek. Other notable appearances include skate videos by Viceland, Thrasher magazine and Converse, as well as the seminal Birdhouse Skateboards film The Beginning.

=== Recent work ===
On November 2, 2010, Hopewell released the first volume of a two-part live album, Hopewell Live, recorded between Truck Festival America (2010) and All Tomorrow's Parties, New York in 2009. The first of the two volumes features several songs from Hopewell's fifth full-length, Good Good Desperation (2009, Tee Pee Records) and was released to correspond with the band's US tour supporting The Dandy Warhols. In 2012 Hopewell released the Another Music EP, the lead single of which is a cover of Brian Eno's Needle In The Camel's Eye featuring Mark Gardener of the band Ride on lead vocals.

== Albums ==
- Contact (Burnt Hair, 1998)
- The Purple Balloon EP (Priapus, 1999)
- The Curved Glass (Priapus, 2001)
- Hopewell & The Birds of Appetite (Tee Pee Records, 2005)
- The Notbirds EP (Sunnylane, 2006)
- Beautiful Targets (Tee Pee Records / Star Mole (Japan), 2007)
- Good Good Desperation (Tee Pee Records, May 5, 2009)
- Hopewell Live Volume I (South Cherry Entropy, November 2, 2010)
- Another Music (EP) (Tee pee Records, 2012)
