= Together Forever (The Cyber Pet Song) =

1998 song by Daze

Single by Daze

from the album Super Heroes
- Released: 1998
- Length: 3:03
- Label: Epic
- Songwriter(s): Jesper Tønnov Rasmussen; Sieber
- Producer(s): Johnny Jam; Delgado

Daze singles chronology
"Superhero" (1997)	"Together Forever (The Cyber Pet Song)" (1998)	"15 Minutes of Fame" (1999)

Music video
- "Together Forever (The Cyber Pet Song)" on YouTube

"Tamagotchi"

Single by Daze

from the album Super Heroes
- Released: 1997
- Length: 3:03
- Label: Epic

"Together Forever (The Cyber Pet Song)" is a 1998 song by Danish Eurodance band Daze. It was released as the fourth single from their first album, Super Heroes (1997), and was originally released in Scandinavia in 1997 as "Tamagotchi". The year after, it was re-released worldwide with a new title, proving to be a big hit in Scandinavia and Belgium. It peaked at number five in Sweden, number six in Finland and number 11 in both Flanders and Norway. On the Eurochart Hot 100, the single reached number 88 in February 1998.

== Track listing ==
CD single, Scandinavia (1997)
No.	Title	Length
1.	"Tamagotchi" (album version)	3:03
2.	"Tamagotchi" (Xtended version)	5:00

CD single, Europe (1998)
No.	Title	Length
1.	"Together Forever" (album version)	3:03
2.	"Together Forever" (Xtended version)	5:00

CD maxi, Denmark (1998)
No.	Title	Length
1.	"Together Forever (The Cyber Pet Song)" (album version)	3:03
2.	"Together Forever (The Cyber Pet Song)" (Forthright club vocal)	6:57
3.	"Together Forever (The Cyber Pet Song)" (Forthright club dub)	6:41

== Charts ==
=== "Tamagotchi" ===
Chart (1997–1998)	Peak position
Europe (Eurochart Hot 100)	88
Finland (Suomen virallinen lista)	6
Sweden (Sverigetopplistan)	44

=== "Together Forever (The Cyber Pet Song)" ===
==== Weekly charts ====
Chart (1998)	Peak position
Belgium (Ultratop 50 Flanders)	11
Belgium (Ultratop 50 Wallonia)	30
Norway (VG-lista)	11
Sweden (Sverigetopplistan)	5
UK Singles (OCC)	95

==== Year-end charts ====
Chart (1998)	Position
Sweden (Hitlistan)	51
