= Superhero (Daze song) =

1997 single by Daze

Single by Daze

from the album Super Heroes
- Released: 1997
- Genre: Eurodance
- Length: 3:22
- Label: Epic
- Songwriters: Jesper Tønnov Rasmussen; Lucas Sieber
- Producers: Johnny Jam; Delgado

Daze singles chronology
| "Superhero" (1997) | "Together Forever (The Cyber Pet Song)" (1998) |

Music video
- "Superhero" on YouTube

"Superhero" (or "Super Hero") is a song by Danish Eurodance band Daze, released in 1997 as the first single from their debut album, Super Heroes (1997). The song was written by Jesper Tønnov Rasmussen and Lucas Sieber and produced by Johnny Jam and Delgado. It was successful in Scandinavia, peaking at number two in Denmark, Finland and Norway. In Sweden, it missed the top 10, reaching number 11. The single became the fastest-selling single of 1997 in Denmark as well as reaching number one on the Danish radio and club charts. Daze won the Best Dance Act of the Year award at the Danish Grammy Awards.

== Critical reception ==
AllMusic editor Stephen Thomas Erlewine felt that "Superhero", compared to Aqua's "Barbie Girl", was "quite similar to that slice of relentlessly catchy and danceable Europop". Larry Flick from Billboard wrote, "Is there still a little steam left in the Euro-NRG movement? When the material is as giddy and catchy as this, you bet. This exuberant trio—fronted by the chirpy Bix and helmed by the producers behind Aqua—speeds through a rave-ish groove and a sea of cotton-candy synths. Bix is not an extraordinary vocalist, but she's several notches above her European contemporaries, vamping with notable dexterity and confidence. The hook is sticky good fun and perfect car-radio fodder. Expect it to be blasting from rhythm-crossover and top 40 stations well into the early summer season."

Gerald Martinez from New Straits Times complimented it as a "bouncy and catchy dance tune". Music Week stated that Aqua's fellow Danes Daze "have come up with a Europop classic, though cynics might regard it as just a predictable re-hash of the "Barbie Girl" sound." They added, "Pulsating and infectious, "Superhero" is a totally danceable hit. The kids will love it, with its "eey yay oh" chorus hook".

== Chart performance ==
"Superhero" reached number two in Denmark, Finland and Norway. The song was also a number-one hit on both the Danish Airplay Chart and the Danish Dance Chart. Additionally, it entered the top 20 in Sweden and the top 30 in the Netherlands. In the United Kingdom, it peaked at number 76 during its first week on the UK Singles Chart, on 17 May 1998. On the Eurochart Hot 100, it reached number 91 in October 1997. Outside Europe, "Superhero" charted in both New Zealand and the United States, peaking at number 42 and 88, respectively.

== Music video ==
There were made two different music videos for the song. The second version was later made available on YouTube in 2018 and by September 2023, it had generated more than 6,7 million views.

== Track listing ==
- CD single, Denmark (1997)
1. "Superhero" (albumversion) – 3:45
2. "Superhero" (albumversion xtended) – 5:05
- CD single, UK & Europe (1998)
1. "Superhero" (album version) – 3:25
2. "Superhero" (Rated PG club mix – radio edit) – 4:02
3. "Superhero" (Rated PG club mix) – 7:47
4. "Superhero" (Rated PG Dubstrumental) – 7:48
5. "Superhero" (album version extended) – 5:09
6. "Superhero" (Superhero Club Extra) – 6:181
- CD maxi, Scandinavia (1997)
1. "Superhero" (albumversion) – 3:45
2. "Superhero" (albumversion xtended) – 5:05
3. "Superhero" (Super Hero club mix) – 4:30
4. "Superhero" (Super Hero club xtra) – 6:15

== Charts ==
=== Weekly charts ===
| Chart (1997–1998) | Peak position |
|---|---|
| Belgium (Ultratip Bubbling Under Flanders) | 6 |
| Denmark (IFPI) | 2 |
| Denmark (Danish Airplay Chart) | 1 |
| Denmark (Danish Dance Chart) | 1 |
| Europe (Eurochart Hot 100) | 91 |
| Finland (Suomen virallinen lista) | 2 |
| Netherlands (Dutch Top 40) | 23 |
| Netherlands (Single Top 100) | 32 |
| New Zealand (Recorded Music NZ) | 42 |
| Norway (VG-lista) | 2 |
| Scotland Singles (OCC) | 66 |
| Sweden (Sverigetopplistan) | 11 |
| UK Singles (OCC) | 76 |
| US Billboard Hot 100 | 88 |
| US Dance Singles Sales (Billboard) | 27 |
| US Hot Latin Songs (Billboard) | 32 |

=== Year-end charts ===
| Chart (1997) | Position |
|---|---|
| Sweden (Topplistan) | 34 |

== Certifications ==
| Region | Certification | Certified units/sales |
|---|---|---|
| Norway (IFPI Norway) | Platinum | |
| Sweden (GLF) | Gold | 15,000^{^} |
^{^} Shipments figures based on certification alone.
