= Daze (band) =

Danish Eurodance band

- Origin: Copenhagen, Denmark
- Genres: Eurodance
- Years active: 1997–present
- Labels: Sony Music; Columbia Records; Epic Records
- Members: Trine Bix; Jesper Tønnov; Lucas Sieber

Daze is a Danish Eurodance band, best known for their singles "Superhero", "Toy Boy" and "Together Forever (The Cyber Pet Song)". The group's members are Trine Bix, Jesper Tønnov and Lucas Sieber.

The group's "zany" "turbo-pop" musical style is compared to that of Danish-Norwegian Europop band Aqua.

== History ==
Daze started out as Systematixx in 1994, with Trine Bix, Jesper Tønnov, Lucas Sieber and Steen Bay Hansen. In 1997, Bix, Tønnov and Sieber decided to form a new band, and chose the name Daze, which was a brainchild of RnB producer Karlin. Steen did not join the group for unknown reasons.

The group's music is inspired by Aqua, Dr. Alban and Herbie Crichlow.

The group's debut album, Super Heroes, initially published in Scandinavia by Sony Music, sold 31,000 copies on the release date and was later released in the United States by Columbia Records and in non-Nordic global territories by Epic Records. It became a double platinum international hit.

In February 1998, the group won the Danish Grammy Award for Best Dance Album of 1997. Their debut single, "Superhero", was nominated as 1997 Danish hit of the year by G.A.F.F.A. magazine. It was also very famous in Argentina during those years.

In 2012, the group announced on their official Facebook page that their new single would be called "Fool Me". On 23 June 2012, it was released to digital music stores, such as iTunes and Spotify, in Europe, along with an extended mix. It also features their original logo, which was dropped after the release of Super Heroes in the late 90s and replaced by the flame logo. An international release date is expected soon.

In 2013, the group competed in the Dansk Melodi Grand Prix selection in Denmark for a place in the Eurovision Song Contest with another new single, "We Own the Universe".

== Discography ==
=== Albums ===
- 1997 - Super Heroes
- 1999 - They Came to Rule

=== Singles ===
Year	Single	Peak chart positions								Album
Year	Single	BEL (Vl)	BEL (Wa)	DEN	FIN	NED	NOR	NZ	SWE	Album
1997	"Superhero"	—	—	2	2	32	2	42	11	Super Heroes
1997	"Toy Boy"	—	—	3	14	—	—	—	47	Super Heroes
1998	"Together Forever (The Cyber Pet Song)"	11	30	—	6	—	11	—	5 (Note: Originally released in 1997 as "Tamagotchi", it peaked at number 44.)	Super Heroes
1999	"15 Minutes of Fame"	—	—	—	—	—	—	—	54	They Came to Rule
2000	"2nd Chance"	—	—	—	—	—	—	—	—	They Came to Rule
2012	"Fool Me"	—	—	—	—	—	—	—	—	Non-album singles
2013	"We Own the Universe"	—	—	—	—	—	—	—	—	Non-album singles
"—" denotes items which were not released in that country or failed to chart.
