= The Essential Mercury Rev: Stillness Breathes 1991–2006 =

Compilation album by Mercury Rev
- Released: October 2, 2006
- Recorded: 1991–2006
- Genre: Indie rock, experimental rock
- Label: V2

Mercury Rev chronology
Hello Blackbird (2006)	The Essential Mercury Rev: Stillness Breathes 1991–2006 (2006)

Professional ratings
Review scores
Source	Rating
AllMusic	4.5/5 stars
Mojo	4/5 stars
musicOMH	5/5 stars
Pitchfork Media	8.3/10
Q	3/5 stars
Record Collector	4/5 stars
Sound Generator	8/10

The Essential Mercury Rev: Stillness Breathes 1991–2006 is a double disc compilation album by the band Mercury Rev. Disc one compiles tracks from their first six studio albums, while disc two consists of covers, B-sides, and previously unreleased tracks.

== Track listing ==
Disc 1

1. "Diamonds" (from The Secret Migration)
2. "Everlasting Arm" (from See You on the Other Side)
3. "In a Funny Way" (from The Secret Migration)
4. "Goddess on a Hiway" (from Deserter's Songs)
5. "Chasing a Bee" (from Yerself Is Steam)
6. "The Dark Is Rising" (from All Is Dream)
7. "Black Forest (Lorelei)" (from The Secret Migration)
8. "Holes" (from Deserter's Songs)
9. "Car Wash Hair" (from Yerself Is Steam)
10. "Empire State (Son House in Excelsis)" (from See You on the Other Side)
11. "Something for Joey" (from Boces)
12. "Frittering" (from Yerself Is Steam)
13. "A Drop in Time" (from All Is Dream)
14. "Opus 40" (from Deserter's Songs)

Disc 2

1. "I Don't Wanna Be a Soldier" (John Lennon)
2. "I Only Have Eyes for You (featuring Sean O'Hagan)" (The Lettermen)
3. "Observatory Crest" (Captain Beefheart)
4. "Streets of Laredo" (Famous cowboy ballad)
5. "So There (featuring Robert Creeley)"
6. "Afraid" (Nico)
7. "He Was a Friend of Mine" (Traditional folk song - Bob Dylan arrangement)
8. "Delta Sun Bottleneck Stomp" (Chemical Brothers remix)
9. "It's a Man's Man's Man's World" (James Brown)
10. "Clamor" (Mercury Rev)
11. "Seagull" (Mercury Rev)
12. "Lucy in the Sky with Diamonds" (The Beatles)
13. "Coney Island Cyclone" (Mercury Rev)
14. "Silver Street" (Nikki Sudden and David Kusworth)
15. "Deadman" (Alan Vega)
16. "Philadelphia" (Neil Young)
17. "Good Times Ahead" (Mercury Rev)
18. "Memory of a Free Festival" (David Bowie)
