= Holes (Mercury Rev song) =

1999 single by Mercury Rev

Single by Mercury Rev

from the album Deserter's Songs
- Released: July 7, 1999
- Recorded: Tarbox Studios, NRS Studios, Six Hours Studios
- Genre: Chamber pop
- Length: 4:10 (edit); 5:55 (album version)
- Label: V2 Records
- Songwriters: Jonathan Donahue, Sean "Grasshopper" Mackowiak
- Producers: Dave Fridmann, Jonathan Donahue, Aaron Hurwitz

Mercury Rev singles chronology
"Opus 40" (1999)	"Holes" (1999)	"Goddess on a Hiway" (1999)

"Holes" is the fourth single from Mercury Rev's fourth studio album, Deserter's Songs. The single was released in Australia only as a limited edition tour EP on July 7, 1999, although promotional CD singles were distributed to UK radio stations in 2006 (to coincide with the release of the Mercury Rev collection The Essential Mercury Rev: Stillness Breathes 1991-2006). The tour single included a live cover of "Caroline Says Pt. II" (Lou Reed) and featured Robert Creeley reading his poem "I Dreamt" over a Mercury Rev soundtrack.

PopMatters rated the song 60 in its list of 100 greatest alternative singles of the 1990s.

== Track listing ==
Australian tour single:

1. "Holes" (Edit) - 4:10
2. "Car Wash Hair" (Live) - 7:55
3. "I Dreamt" - 1:30
4. "Caroline Says Pt. II" (Live) - 3:33

2006 promo single:

1. "Seagull" (unreleased outtake from The Secret Migration) - 3:07
2. "Holes" - 5:55
