= Delta Sun Bottleneck Stomp =

Single by Mercury Rev

from the album Deserter's Songs
- Released: January 25, 1999
- Recorded: Tarbox Studios, NRS Studios, Six Hours Studios
- Genre: Alternative rock
- Length: 3:06 (edit); 3:51 (album version)
- Label: V2 Records
- Songwriters: Jimy Chambers, Jonathan Donahue, Sean "Grasshopper" Mackowiak
- Producers: Dave Fridmann, Jonathan Donahue, Aaron Hurwitz

Mercury Rev singles chronology
"Goddess on a Hiway" (1998)	"Delta Sun Bottleneck Stomp" (1999)	"Opus 40" (1999)

"Delta Sun Bottleneck Stomp" is the second single from Mercury Rev's fourth studio album, Deserter's Songs. The single was released in the UK on January 25, 1999, and peaked at number 26 on the UK Singles Chart.

Mercury Rev drummer Jimy Chambers is credited as the lyrics writer for "Delta Sun Bottleneck Stomp." B-sides include live covers of "Vampire Blues" (Neil Young) and "Isolation" (John Lennon).

== Track listing ==
=== UK ===
CD #1:

1. "Delta Sun Bottleneck Stomp" (Edit) - 3:06
2. "Delta Sun Bottleneck Stomp" (The Chemical Brothers Remix) - 6:22
3. "Vampire Blues" (Live) - 2:50

CD #2:

1. "Delta Sun Bottleneck Stomp" (Edit) - 3:06
2. "Holes" / "I Collect Coins" [unlisted] (Live) - 7:04
3. "Isolation" (Live) - 4:10

12" vinyl:

1. "Delta Sun Bottleneck Stomp" (The Chemical Brothers Remix) - 6:22
2. "Delta Sun Bottleneck Stomp" (Edit) - 3:06
3. "Endlessly" (instrumental) - 4:25

=== Australia ===
CD:

1. "Delta Sun Bottleneck Stomp" (Edit) - 3:06
2. "Delta Sun Bottleneck Stomp" (The Chemical Brothers Remix) - 6:22
3. "Vampire Blues" (Live) - 2:50
4. "Holes" / "I Collect Coins" (Live) - 7:04
5. "Isolation" (Live) - 4:10
