= Born Horses =

Studio album by Mercury Rev
- Released: September 6, 2024
- Length: 40:03
- Label: Bella Union
- Producer: Mercury Rev, Simon Raymonde

Mercury Rev chronology
Bobbie Gentry's The Delta Sweete Revisited (2019)	Born Horses (2024)

Singles from Born Horses
- 1. "Patterns" Released: 4 June 2024; 2. "Ancient Love" Released: 3 July 2024; 3. "A Bird of No Address" Released: 8 August 2024

Born Horses
Aggregate scores
Source	Rating
Metacritic	75/100
Review scores
Source	Rating
AllMusic	4/5
The Observer	4/5

Born Horses is the tenth album by American rock band Mercury Rev. The album was released on September 6, 2024 through Bella Union.

== Track listing ==
All tracks are written by Jesse Chandler, Jonathan Donahue, Marion Genser, and Sean Mackowiak, with lyrics by Jonathan Donahue.

No.	Title	Length
1.	"Mood Swings"	7:14
2.	"Ancient Love"	5:53
3.	"Your Hammer, My Heart"	4:43
4.	"Patterns"	3:53
5.	"A Bird of No Address"	4:12
6.	"Born Horses"	3:39
7.	"Everything I Thought I Had Lost"	6:12
8.	"There's Always Been a Bird in Me"	4:13

== Personnel ==
- Grasshopper - Bells, Guitar, Horn Arrangements, Omnichord, Percussion, Whistle
- Jesse Chandler - Bass Pedals, Flute, Mellotron, Piano, Sax (Tenor), Vibraphone
- Jonathan Donahue - Arranger, Lyricist, Orchestration, Piano, Vocals
- Marion Genser - Atmosphere, Harmonium, Organ, Prophet Synthesizer, Sounds

=== Additional musicians ===
- Chris Heitzman - Bass (Electric), Guitar (12 String Acoustic)
- Danny Wayside - Cornet
- Jeff Lipstein - Drums
- Martin Keith - Bass (Upright)
- Megan Gould - Violin
- Thomas Green - Saxophone
- Will Bryant - Accordion, Organ (Hammond)

=== Technical personnel ===
- David Clark Perry - Packaging
- Marion Genser - Artwork
- Greg Calbi - Mastering
- Mercury Rev - Producer
- Peter Katis - Mixing
- Simon Raymonde - Executive Producer
