= Goddess on a Hiway =

1998 single by Mercury Rev

Single by Mercury Rev

from the album Deserter's Songs
- Released: November 2, 1998; August 16, 1999 (re-issue)
- Recorded: Tarbox Studios, NRS Studios, Six Hours Studios
- Genre: Alternative rock
- Length: 3:45
- Label: V2 Records
- Songwriter(s): Jonathan Donahue, Sean "Grasshopper" Mackowiak
- Producer(s): Dave Fridmann, Jonathan Donahue, Aaron Hurwitz

Mercury Rev singles chronology
| "Everlasting Arm" (1995) | "Goddess on a Hiway" (1998) | "Delta Sun Bottleneck Stomp" (1999) |
| Holes (1999) | Goddess on a Hiway (1999) | Nite and Fog (2001) |

"Goddess on a Hiway" is the first single from Mercury Rev's fourth studio album, Deserter's Songs. The single was first released on November 2, 1998, and then re-issued on August 16, 1999. Two music videos were produced for the song, one directed by Anton Corbijn, the other directed by James & Alex (featured on the 1999 eCD single). B-sides include a cover of "I Only Have Eyes for You" featuring musician Sean O'Hagan.

The song's lyrics takes advantage of homonymy: the first verse contains the lines "I got us on a highway, I got us in a car..." This changes to "She's a goddess on a highway, a goddess in a car..."

In October 2011, NME placed it at number 122 on its list "150 Best Tracks of the Past 15 Years".

In 2021, the song was used in the film Gunpowder Milkshake.

== Background ==
"Goddess" was originally written by Mercury Rev frontman Jonathan Donahue in 1989 while he was still a member of The Flaming Lips. The song had been largely forgotten until it was found on an old cassette tape during the sessions for Deserter’s Songs. Donahue was reluctant to work on the old song, and had to be convinced to resurrect it for the album.

== Track listing ==
=== United Kingdom ===
1998 CD:

1. "Goddess on a Hiway" - 3:45
2. "Ragtag" - 2:42
3. "I Only Have Eyes for You" (featuring Sean O'Hagan) - 4:22

1998 7" vinyl:

1. "Goddess on a Hiway" - 3:45
2. "Ragtag" - 2:42

=== UK Re-issue ===
1999 CD #1:

1. "Goddess on a Hiway" - 3:45
2. "I Don't Want to Be a Soldier" (Live Peel Session, May 5, 1999) - 3:30
3. "Car Wash Hair" (Live BBC Radio Session) - 7:55

1999 CD #2:

1. "Goddess on a Hiway" - 3:45
2. "I Dreamt" (read by Robert Creeley) - 1:30
3. "Very Sleepy Rivers" - 12:31
4. "Goddess on a Hiway" (enhanced video)

=== United States ===
"Goddess on a Hiway +5" promo EP CD:

1. "Goddess on a Hiway" - 3:45
2. "Delta Sun Bottleneck Stomp" (The Chemical Brothers Remix) - 6:22
3. "Ragtag" - 2:42
4. "I Only Have Eyes for You" (featuring Sean O'Hagan) - 4:22
5. "Vampire Blues" (Live) - 2:50
6. "Isolation" (Live) - 4:10

=== Japan ===
EP CD:

1. "Goddess on a Hiway" - 3:45
2. "Car Wash Hair" (Live BBC Radio Session) - 7:55
3. "Caroline Says Pt. II" - 3:33
4. "Vampire Blues" (Live) - 2:50
5. "Holes" / "I Collect Coins" [unlisted] (Live) - 7:04
6. "Isolation" (Live) - 4:10
7. "Very Sleepy Rivers" - 12:31
8. "I Only Have Eyes for You" (featuring Sean O'Hagan) - 4:22
9. "Goddess on a Hiway" (enhanced video)
