= Bobbie Gentry's The Delta Sweete Revisited =

Studio album by Mercury Rev
- Released: February 8, 2019
- Genre: Gothic country
- Length: 42:42
- Label: Partisan
- Producer: Mercury Rev

Mercury Rev chronology
The Light in You (2015)	Bobbie Gentry's The Delta Sweete Revisited (2019)	Born Horses (2024)

Professional ratings
Aggregate scores
Source	Rating
Metacritic	73/100
Review scores
Source	Rating
AllMusic	4/5 stars
American Songwriter	4/5 stars
Consequence of Sound	B-
Drowned in Sound	7/10
MusicOMH	4/5 stars

Bobbie Gentry's The Delta Sweete Revisited is the ninth album by American rock band Mercury Rev. The album, which is a re-imagining of Bobbie Gentry's 1968 album The Delta Sweete, was released on February 8, 2019 through Partisan Records. Song-by-song cover version of the album with "Louisiana Man" replaced by "Ode to Billie Joe".

== Track listing ==
All tracks are written by Bobbie Gentry, except where noted.

No.	Title	Writer(s)	Featured artist(s)	Length
1.	"Okolona River Bottom Band"		Norah Jones	4:36
2.	"Big Boss Man"	Luther Dixon; Al Smith	Hope Sandoval	3:24
3.	"Reunion"		Rachel Goswell	2:21
4.	"Parchman Farm"	Mose Allison	Carice van Houten	3:47
5.	"Mornin' Glory"		Laetitia Sadier	3:22
6.	"Sermon"		Margo Price	4:31
7.	"Tobacco Road"	John D. Loudermilk	Susanne Sundfør	2:51
8.	"Penduli Pendulum"		Vashti Bunyan and Kaela Sinclair	3:10
9.	"Jesseye' Lisabeth"		Phoebe Bridgers	3:04
10.	"Refractions"		Marissa Nadler	2:28
11.	"Courtyard"		Beth Orton	3:31
12.	"Ode to Billie Joe"		Lucinda Williams	5:37

== Personnel ==
Mercury Rev

- Grasshopper
- Jesse Chandler
- Jonathan Donahue

== Charts ==
Chart	Peak position
Belgian Albums (Ultratop Flanders)	51
Belgian Albums (Ultratop Wallonia)	90
Dutch Albums (Album Top 100)	139
French Albums (SNEP)	184
Scottish Albums (OCC)	9
UK Albums (OCC)	32
UK Independent Albums (OCC)	1
US Heatseekers Albums (Billboard)	2
US Independent Albums (Billboard)	13
