= See You on the Other Side (Mercury Rev album) =

Studio album by Mercury Rev
- Released: May 1, 1995
- Genres: Neo-psychedelia, noise pop
- Length: 39:16
- Label: Beggars Banquet
- Producers: Jonathan Donahue, Dave Fridmann, Grasshopper, Suzanne Thorpe, Jimy Chambers

Mercury Rev chronology
Boces (1993)	See You on the Other Side (1995)	Deserter's Songs (1998)

Singles from See You on the Other Side
- 1. "Everlasting Arm"/"Dead Man" Released: 1994; 2. "Young Man's Stride" Released: 1995 (promo)

See You on the Other Side is the third studio album by American neo-psychedelia band Mercury Rev, released in the United Kingdom on May 1, 1995 by record label Beggars Banquet, then in the United States on September 19, 1995 by Work.

== Content ==
See You on the Other Side was the first Mercury Rev album to be recorded following the departure of frontman David Baker, with band member Jonathan Donahue taking over lead vocal duties. It also marks a transition between the earlier, noisier sound of their first two releases to the more orchestrated, soft and lush arrangements the band would embrace on subsequent albums.

The album cover is taken from a 1975 7 Up commercial entitled "Uncola". The album's back cover is a photograph of Donahue despondently loading a revolver.

The video for "Young Man's Stride" was directed by Moby.

== Critical reception ==
Professional ratings
Review scores
Source	Rating
AllMusic	4/5 stars
NME	8/10
Q	4/5 stars
The Rolling Stone Album Guide	3/5 stars
Select	4/5
Spin	7/10
Uncut	8/10

In a retrospective review for AllMusic, Heather Phares described See You on the Other Side as "an album very much in the group's expansive, experimental tradition, yet distinct from its work with Baker", noting that "without Baker's merry prankster vocals, the album feels a bit unbalanced, as though the group was still adjusting to making music without him when the album was recorded." She nonetheless found Donahue a capable vocalist, "swinging the group toward its gently whimsical side", and concluded that the record "pointed the way toward Mercury Rev's breakthrough with Deserter's Songs, and is a completely charming – if underrated – album in its own right."

== Track listing ==
No.	Title	Writer(s)	Length
1.	"Empire State (Son House in Excelsis)"	Jonathan Donahue, Sean "Grasshopper" Mackowiak, Suzanne Thorpe	7:29
2.	"Young Man's Stride"	Donahue, Mackowiak	2:43
3.	"Sudden Ray of Hope"	Jimy Chambers, Donahue, Dave Fridmann, Mackowiak, Thorpe	5:18
4.	"Everlasting Arm"	Donahue, Mackowiak, Thorpe	5:15
5.	"Racing the Tide"	Chambers, Donahue, Mackowiak, Thorpe	7:31
6.	"Close Encounters of the 3rd Grade"	Chambers, Donahue, Fridmann, Mackowiak, Thorpe	3:03
7.	"A Kiss from An Old Flame (A Trip to the Moon)"	Donahue, Mackowiak	4:22
8.	"Peaceful Night"	Donahue, Mackowiak	3:32

Bonus track on some Japan pressings
No.	Title	Length
9.	"Cartwheel"	7:06

== Personnel ==
Adapted from the liner notes

- Jonathan Donahue – Vocals, Harmony Rocket Guitars, Guitorgan, Bowed Saws and Sounds
- Dave Fridmann – Bass Explore, B-3, Pianos, Dual Vocals
- Jimy Chambers – Drumming, Mojo Stick, Wurlitzer Electric Pianos
- Grasshopper – Guitar Shapes, Single Exhaust Clarinet, Tettix Wave Accumulator®
- Suzanne Thorpe – Quartz Arhoolie Flutes, French Horns

All Horns and Strings arranged by Donahue/Grasshopper

except

"Sudden Ray of Hope" by Chambers/Thorpe

== Other Musicians ==
- Mark Marinoff – Saxophones
- Matt Jordan – Trumpets
- Rachel Handman – Strings
- Chris Reilly – Tablas
- Jake Congelo – Piano on "Peaceful Night"
- Carmen Quinoñes – Female Vocals on "Racing the Tide" and "Close Encounters of the 3rd Grade"
- Tomcat Stamos – Expressed Male Interruptions on "Close Encounters of the 3rd Grade"
