= Marvelkind =

- Marvelkind in Los Angeles 2007

Background information
- Origin: Chicago, Illinois
- Genres: Indie rock, electropop
- Years active: 1995–present
- Members: Benjamin Hughes; Seth Larson; David Golitko; Aaron Miller
- Website: www.marvelkind.com

Marvelkind is an eclectic electronic rock band from Chicago, Illinois, USA. Their music is described by rock critic Jim Derogatis as "Gonzo Electro Noise Pop" and they have been compared to bands such as Devo, The Faint, Brainiac, and Mercury Rev. Marvelkind is notable for their expansive use of keyboards and electronics coupled with extremely frenetic live shows.

The band's current lineup was formed in the early fall of 1991 in Naperville, Illinois. The original line-up of Benjamin Hughes, David Golitko, Brent Rickles, Jeremy Lemmon, and Rob Johnson, performed their first show in May, 1991, under the moniker Shangrila. After a West Coast tour in 1993, the band changed their name to Marvelkind (sometimes spelled Marvel Kind).

In the fall of 1993, Johnson departed the group, and was replaced by Aaron Miller. In 1995, Lemmon left the band and was replaced by Seth Larson. In 1996, they began working with producer and former Mercury Rev and Shady front man David Baker and during the early winter months of 1996 they recorded the Loofa (I Wish I Was Her)/ I'm Electro single which was never officially released.

Over the next two years, they worked with David Baker and Justin Rickles, a.k.a. J-Rick. on their debut EP Mini. Mini was released on Throwrug Records and received a fair amount of critical acclaim. It features guest vocals from Lucky Boys Confusion guitarist/vocalist Adam Krier. The band toured over the next few months and officially relocated to Chicago, IL where they built a home recording studio and began working on their second release. They contributed a version of "Trouble" for the Material Issue compilation cd Just What This World Needs, as well as a Christmas single on their own Crashfinder Records. The songs have since been re-released by Volunteer Records on the Holiday Heart benefit CD. Conquering the Universe Chorus Verse was the band's first full-length album and was released in 2001.

In January 2002 Singer, Benjamin Hughes, relocated to Los Angeles, CA. and the band went on a temporary hiatus. Members Aaron Miller, and David Golitko, went on to form Assassins. Over the next few years they managed to continue recording and released their second full-length album State of the Artificial in late 2007.

Sometime around 2009 Aaron Miller relocated to Los Angeles and immediately began working with Benjamin Hughes on an ambitious new project, Bishop v. Spy. A two-piece music and visual art installation, that consisted of both live and pre-recorded elements of sound and vision. The concept was to simultaneously entertain, and create an open dialogue, discussing the aspects and merits of modern musical groups, who use pre-recordings in live performances. Due to the extensive setup of projectors, screens, lights and musical equipment, Bishop v Spy (BvS) would forgo traditional music venues for Galleries, Film Festivals, Movie Theaters, Art Parties and events. BvS would make a concerted effort masking what was happening in their mysterious setup, pushing boundaries and blurring lines of Man and/or Machine. This illusion posed further inquiry as to the importance put upon artists to unrealistic and unnecessary standards of traditional musicianship, live or on recording. BvS proved that quality, integrity, or the "purity" was, like all art, entirely a subjective, and was left up to the individual and eventually history to decide.

They released one E.P. 14" that was intended on being a double 7" on their very own label, Crashfinder Records.

== Band members ==
- Benjamin Hughes — Vocals, guitar
- David Golitko — Vocals, guitar, keyboard
- Aaron Miller — Drums, electronics
- Seth Larson — Keyboards, bass guitar

Former members

- Brent Rickles — Bass Guitar (1991–2000)
- Jeremy Lemmon — Guitar (1991–95)
- Robert Johnson —Drums (1991–93)

Producers and Engineers

- David Baker — Mini
- Justin Rickles, a.k.a. J-Rick; - Mini, Two Sides
- Adam Olmsted — State of the Artificial

== Discography ==
Height/Lambchop —7" single (1994)
Cherry Wine/ 94.3 —Split 7" single with Star Period Star (1997)
Purple Cassette —Unreleased cassette demo (1997)
Mini —E.P. Throwrug records (1998)
Two Sides —Split 7" single with Today's My Super Spaceout Day(1999)
Just What This World Needs A Tribute to Material Issue —Veronica Records(2000)
A (Not So) Merry Christmas—Limited Edition CD Single (2000)
Conquering the Universe Chorus Verse —L.P. (2001)
State of the Artificial —L.P. (2007)

== The Logan Blvd. House ==
- The Marvelkind lived in a house on Logan Blvd in Chicago IL, for 6 years with Mercury Rev front man David Baker. There were multiple studios setup throughout the house and guests of the marvelkind included The Faint, Soviet, Assassins, Local H, Nash Kato and a number of other local bands and artists.
- Artists Seth and Lisa Williamson worked from the house garage for many years producing a number of paintings, prints, and sculptures.
- The soundtrack to the feature length film Design was recorded here by David Golitko.
- Early versions of the Assassins songs on their first album You Will Changed Us were recorded by Aaron Miller, David Golitko, and Joe Cassidy in the Logan house.
- The house was the childhood home of Marilu Henner
- Benjamin Hughes is currently working as an actor, film credits include: Just Like Heaven, Yes Man in addition to dozens of commercials.
