= Deserter's Songs =

Studio album by Mercury Rev
- Released: September 29, 1998
- Studio: Tarbox Road Studios; NRS Studios; Six Hours Studios
- Genre: Chamber pop; Americana
- Length: 44:39
- Label: V2
- Producer: Dave Fridmann, Jonathan Donahue

Mercury Rev chronology
See You on the Other Side (1995)	Deserter's Songs (1998)	All Is Dream (2001)

Singles from Deserter's Songs
- 1. "Goddess on a Hiway" Released: November 2, 1998; 2. "Delta Sun Bottleneck Stomp" Released: January 25, 1999; 3. "Opus 40" Released: May 10, 1999; 4. "Holes" Released: July 7, 1999; 5. "Goddess on a Hiway" Released: August 16, 1999 (reissue)

Deserter's Songs is the fourth studio album by American rock band Mercury Rev, released in late September 1998. British music magazine NME named Deserter's Songs album of the year for 1998. Limited edition copies of the album came in a brown cardboard envelope-like package, with a stamp on the cover postmarked with the release date, as well as two art postcards.

The success of this album was a surprise for the band. After the commercial failure of their previous album See You on the Other Side, which frontman Jonathan Donahue considered to be the band's best album, they decided to make one more record entirely for themselves, ignoring commercial influences, and expecting to split up shortly afterward. Surprisingly, Deserter's Songs was their most successful album, bringing them popularity in the UK and Europe, also making a smaller mark in the US.

== Background ==
The world wasn't exactly waiting for another Mercury Rev record. — Mercury Rev frontman Jonathan Donahue

When Mercury Rev returned home from touring their 1995 album See You on the Other Side, they were a band in disarray. Sales of See You had been disappointing and, as a result, the band had requested to be dropped from their label. To make matters worse, the band's manager was gone, longtime drummer Jimy Chambers had left the band, their lawyers had recently been let go, and Mercury Rev was in debt. As frontman Jonathan Donahue slid into a deep depression, communication between the band members was virtually non-existent.

In the depths of his depression, Donahue began listening to some of his favorite childhood records, including Tale Spinners for Children, a collection of spoken-word fairy tales set to classical music. Influenced by this decidedly non-rock musical source, the frontman started composing and recording simple melodies on the piano. These demo recordings would prove to be the first steps in the new direction Mercury Rev would take on Deserter's Songs.

Donahue was approached at this time by The Chemical Brothers and asked to play on a song of theirs called "The Private Psychedelic Reel". Shocked that someone not only remembered Mercury Rev but also wanted to collaborate, Donahue enthusiastically dove into the project. It would be the boost that he needed to restore his confidence and focus on making music again.

Following his Chemical Brothers collaboration, Donahue started talking to Mercury Rev guitarist Sean "Grasshopper" Mackowiak, and the two began sharing and recording musical ideas. Donahue has since revealed that creating Deserter's Songs was more about reestablishing his friendship with Grasshopper (whom he considered his best friend) than anything else. Grasshopper also mentioned that both men were struggling with drugs and relationships at the time.

"It's a record born out of a certain amount of pain," Donahue told Q, "because, after the last tour, we basically fell apart. Grasshopper checked himself into a monastery, the drummer quit, and I suffered two nervous breakdowns. I lost my girlfriend and hurt a lot of the people I love. It was a pretty horrible time; something I can never wholly rectify."

== Writing and recording ==
I think it's special because that was the one that brought us back from the brink. — Mercury Rev guitarist Sean "Grasshopper" Mackowiak on Deserter's Songs

By this time, Donahue and Grasshopper had relocated to the Catskill Mountains, where the writing and recording of Deserter's Songs would ensue over the next six months. Two of the first songs written, "Opus 40" and "The Hudson Line", referenced their new Catskill surroundings. The latter detailed Grasshopper leaving New York City (and its temptations) to spend a month in a Jesuit retreat house in upstate New York. The Catskill influence was only solidified when Garth Hudson and Levon Helm from The Band—who lived in the area—joined the recording sessions.

The song "Goddess on a Hiway" was originally written by Donahue in 1989 while he was still a member of The Flaming Lips. The song had been largely forgotten until it was found on an old cassette tape during the Deserter's sessions. Donahue was reluctant to work on the old song, and had to be convinced by Grasshopper to resurrect it for the album. "Goddess" would later be released as a single.

Thematically, the songs written and recorded for the album explored the act of leaving—of "walking away", as Donahue explained. And indeed, with the band members sensing that the end was near, the album was intended to be something of a farewell from Mercury Rev. Midway through recording, the band signed to V2 Records. Their new record label, fully aware of Mercury Rev's unpredictable and chaotic past, cautiously began funneling money to the band piecemeal to complete the album.

After laying down the basic tracks for Deserter's, the band then spent two months at Tarbox Road studio, recording string arrangements and mixing the album with one-time band member Dave Fridmann. It was at this moment that the band's sound was completely re-imagined. Whereas on previous albums, the band would flesh out basic tracks with layers of distortion and guitars, this time classical music instruments—strings, horns, and woodwinds—were used instead of guitars.

The album was mastered to 35mm magnetic film for fidelity purposes. Producer Fridmann explained that this unique process gave the music an intentionally "weird sound", while enhancing the "cinematic bent" of the music.

== Release ==
Upon Deserter's completion, the album received some unexpected word-of-mouth promotion from Donahue's old collaborators, The Chemical Brothers. An advance copy of the album had been sent to The Chemical Brothers, who in turn began raving to the press that Mercury Rev had created something special. Even so, the band was pleasantly surprised by the album's immediate popularity and success, especially in Europe. Grasshopper recalled being "freaked out" when he first heard "Goddess on a Hiway" being played in a British supermarket. He remarked that "it was just insane ... going from total anxiety and despair in August [just before the album's release] to a total emotional flip flop of euphoria a couple of months later [when the album took off]."

Donahue added: "It had the feeling of rebirth, of going down to the grave for quite a while and lying down there in the darkness and the quiet, and then someone pulls you up and shakes the dirt off you and says 'no, you thought you were dead, but you're not.'"

== Reception and legacy ==
Professional ratings
Review scores
Source	Rating
AllMusic	4.5/5 stars
Christgau's Consumer Guide	C+
Entertainment Weekly	A−
The Guardian	5/5 stars
NME	9/10
Pitchfork	8.5/10 (1998); 9.3/10 (2011)
Q	4/5 stars
The Rolling Stone Album Guide	4/5 stars
Spin	8/10
Uncut	5/5 stars

Deserter's Songs was included in the book 1001 Albums You Must Hear Before You Die.

== Relationship with The Flaming Lips and The Soft Bulletin ==
As Mercury Rev was completing work on Deserter's Songs at Tarbox Road with Dave Fridmann, the producer was simultaneously helping the Flaming Lips craft their breakthrough album The Soft Bulletin in the same studio. In a 2011 interview, the Flaming Lips' Wayne Coyne discussed Deserter's Songs, The Soft Bulletin, and the symbiotic creation of the two albums:

"... there were times when [the Flaming Lips] would go in [to the studio] right after [Mercury Rev], or they would come in right after us, and we were all exploring the same new gadgets together. They were starting to work in Protools at the same time we were. And whatever instruments, whatever new gadgets, between us, Mercury Rev and Dave [Fridmann] ... which ever band would get them, the next group into the studio would use them too. If Dave had just had some breakthrough moment he'd recorded with us, when Mercury Rev would come in he would say 'Hey ... we've got to do this, this is cool'. And the same thing would happen with us. So I think the connection is Dave Fridmann, and also this lack of really believing there would be an audience for this record. I think Mercury Rev felt the same way. Their audience had gone away, and all they could do was make the music that was in their dreams."

Coyne attributes some of The Soft Bulletin's success to a 1999 Flaming Lips tour with Mercury Rev:

"I think without Deserter's Songs being so significant, The Soft Bulletin would probably have not been followed too much. But since it was put in the same vein, people became very interested in us."

== Miscellaneous notes ==
The hidden track at the end of "Delta Sun Bottleneck Stomp" is played on the Tettix Wave Accumulator, an instrument built by Donahue and Grasshopper. As of 2009, the massive instrument was being housed in the basement of a bar.

A 10th anniversary edition of the album was rumored to be released on March 5, 2007, but never came to fruition. Mercury Rev released their seventh studio album Snowflake Midnight on Deserter's Songs' actual 10-year anniversary, September 29, 2008.

In May 2011 a fully instrumental edition of the album was released. In the same month, the band also staged a series of concerts at venues throughout Europe in which the whole album was performed live.

The song "Holes" was used in the 2000 film Panic, starring William H. Macy and Neve Campbell, and in the 2021 film Sing 2.

"Opus 40" appeared on the soundtrack of the 2020 film Love and Monsters.

== Track listing ==
All lyrics by Jonathan Donahue, except "Hudson Line" by Sean "Grasshopper" Mackowiak, and "Delta Sun Bottleneck Stomp" by Jimy Chambers. All music by Jonathan Donahue and Sean "Grasshopper" Mackowiak.

1. "Holes" – 5:55
2. "Tonite It Shows" – 3:40
3. "Endlessly" – 4:25
4. "I Collect Coins" – 1:27
5. "Opus 40" – 5:10
6. "Hudson Line" – 2:54
7. "The Happy End (The Drunk Room)" – 2:06
8. "Goddess on a Hiway" – 3:45
9. "The Funny Bird" – 5:51
10. "Pick Up If You're There" – 3:05
11. "Delta Sun Bottleneck Stomp"/(untitled instrumental) (hidden track) – 6:17

Japanese bonus tracks

12. Underture (silence) – 0:05
13. "Ragtag" – 2:44

=== Deserter's Songs bonus EP ===
Upon the album's release, a 6-track promo EP was issued, featuring covers recorded as B-sides from live recording sessions. The EP was bundled with copies of the album sold at Best Buy stores.

1. "He Was a Friend of Mine" (Bob Dylan) – 3:36
2. "Motion Pictures" (Neil Young) – 3:28
3. "Silver Street" (Nikki Sudden, Dave Kusworth) – 4:41
4. "Philadelphia" (Neil Young) – 3:07
5. "I Only Have Eyes for You" (featuring Sean O'Hagan) (Harry Warren, Al Dubin) – 4:22
6. "Caroline Says Pt. II" (Lou Reed) – 3:33

=== Deserter's Songs: The Film ===
A special edition of the album was released in 2005 with a bonus DVD, featuring an album-length companion film to Deserter's Songs as well as two music videos (directed by Anton Corbijn) and an audio remix track:

1. "Deserter's Songs: The Film" – 44:39
2. "Opus 40" (music video) – 3:36
3. "Goddess on a Hiway" (music video) – 3:44
4. "Delta Sun Bottleneck Stomp" (The Chemical Brothers remix) (audio track) – 6:22

=== Deserter's Songs: Deluxe Edition ===
In 2011, a further reissue of the album surfaced, this time a double-disc "Deluxe Edition" via V2/Cooperative. Unlike previous repackagings, which featured tracks also found spread across various singles and promotional releases, this edition contained a full disc's worth of exclusive material, dubbed Deserted Songs.

Disc one
same as standard edition

Disc two, Deserted Songs

1. "Piano vs. Telephone" (home cassette tape demo)
2. "Holes" (Bill Laswell 1998 remix)
3. "Pick Up, If You're There" (DJ Nickel 1998 remix)
4. "Endlessly" (Tascam 8-track reel to reel demo)
5. "A Soft Kiss (For Waking Up)" (home cassette tape demo)
6. "Tonite It Shows" (Tascam 8-track reel to reel demo)
7. "Looking Back Now, I Can See..." (unreleased mix)
8. "Opus 40" (early rough version)
9. "Hudson Line" (early rough version)
10. "Judging by the Moon" (home cassette tape demo)
11. "Goddess on a Hiway" (1989 home cassette tape demo)
12. "Night on Panther Mountain" (unreleased mix)
13. "Delta Sun Bottleneck Stomp" (early rough version)

== Personnel ==
Per the album liner notes:

Mercury Rev

- Jonathan Donahue – vocals, acoustic guitar, Chamberlin strings
- Sean "Grasshopper" Mackowiak – guitar reels, vocals on #6, woodwinds
- Adam Snyder – Hammond B3 organ, Mellotron, Wurlitzer
- Dave Fridmann – piano, bass, Mellotron, backing vocals
- Suzanne Thorpe – flutes
- Jimy Chambers – Clavinet, harpsichord, drums

Additional musicians

- Levon Helm – drums on "Opus 40"
- Garth Hudson – tenor & alto sax on "Hudson Line"
- Amy Helm & Marie Spinosa – female vox and whistling
- Mary Gavazzi Fridmann – female soprano
- Jeff Mercel – drums
- Joel Eckhouse – bowed saw
- Rachel Handman – violins
- Matt Jordan – flugelhorns
- Jim Burgess – trombones
- Aaron Hurwitz – piano
- Scott Petito – upright electric bass
- Garrett James Uhlenbrock – slide guitar
- Vincent DeSanto – Tettix Wave Accumulator

Production

- Dave Fridmann – producer, engineer
- Jonanathan Donahue – producer, engineer
- Aaron Hurwitz – engineer
- Garrett James Uhlenbrock – additional recording
- Jacques Cohen – additional recording
- Peter Katis – additional recording
- Greg Calbi – mastering
- Scott Hull – mastering assistance

== Charts ==
Chart performance for Deserter's Songs
Chart (1998–1999)	Peak position
Australian Albums (ARIA)	85
French Albums (SNEP)	36
New Zealand Albums (RMNZ)	38
Norwegian Albums (VG-lista)	15
Swedish Albums (Sverigetopplistan)	38
UK Albums (OCC)	27
