= Pay It Later =

2017 single by Superet

Single by Superet

from the EP Superet
- Released: May 15, 2017
- Genre: Indie rock; pop-punk; new wave
- Length: 2:36
- Label: Rob the Rich Recordings
- Songwriter: Matt Blitzer

Superet singles chronology
| "Pay It Later" (2017) | "Who Is This Guy" (2017) |

Music video
- "Pay It Later" on YouTube

"Pay It Later" is a song by American indie rock band Superet. It was released as their debut single on May 15, 2017, for their debut extended play, Superet (2017). Vocalist and guitarist Matt Blitzer wrote the song, which centers lyrically on various self-destructive behaviors. "Pay It Later" is instrumentally backed by an aggressive indie rock sound while incorporating elements of pop-punk and new wave, with mixing by Dave Fridmann. Superet released a music video for the track on June 1, featuring the band performing on a television screen amid distorted visuals. Following its release, "Pay It Later" received positive reviews.

== Background ==
Vocalist and guitarist Matt Blitzer wrote "Pay It Later" between 2013 and 2014, drawing on common young adult behaviors and exaggerating them into extreme self-destruction. He focused on substance abuse and struggling with an identity crisis for the song, working with mixing engineer Dave Fridmann for its studio recording with Superet. "Pay It Later" was released as the band's debut single on May 15, 2017, available on streaming services, and as a free download on the band's website. Zane Lowe played the track on his radio station Beats 1 shortly after, garnering "Pay It Later" additional attention. They began performing it live while touring as opening act for Dreamcar, being their only released song amidst a set of unreleased material.

== Music video ==
A music video for "Pay It Later" was published to YouTube on June 1, 2017, featuring the band performing on a television screen with visuals described by Kyle Schultz of It's All Dead to be "seizure-infused". The video was independently produced on a low budget, filmed using an iPhone while maintaining a static shot. The band intended for it to act as a visualizer rather than a story-based video, describing the EP's aesthetic as subtle.

== Reception ==
Jack Szabo of Cryptic Rock described the indie rock soundscape of "Pay It Later" as similar to the Strokes' style, while Robb Donker of American Pancake complimented the song's grit balanced with elements of new wave music, drawing comparisons to T. Rex, the Sweet, the Killers, and Adam Ant. Matt Horowitz of The Witzard praised the track's desperate energy and categorized it as pop-punk, likening "Pay It Later" to numerous acts including David Bowie, LCD Soundsystem, and the Faint. Kyle Schultz of It's All Dead extensively lauded the song as embodying the post-punk revival, predicting that Superet would soon go mainstream as a result. Later ranking it as one of the best debuts of 2017, Schultz associated the track's aggressive energy with the Fratellis' style. Kevin Bronson of Buzzbands LA commended its steady and sleek production, calling it "a staple for any back-to-basics rock 'n' roll diet".

== Personnel ==
- Matt Blitzer – lead vocals, guitars
- Isaac Tamburino – guitars, keyboards, percussion
- Patrick Kelly – bass
- Alex Fischel – keyboards
- Sam Kauffman-Skloff – drums
- Dave Fridmann – mixing engineer
