= The Light in You =

Studio album by Mercury Rev
- Released: September 18, 2015
- Recorded: 2014–15
- Genre: Alternative rock, neo-psychedelia
- Label: Bella Union
- Producer: Mercury Rev

Mercury Rev chronology
Snowflake Midnight (2008)	The Light in You (2015)	Bobbie Gentry's The Delta Sweete Revisited (2019)

The Light in You is the eighth studio album by American rock band Mercury Rev, released on September 18, 2015, by Bella Union. The Light in You is the band's first entirely self-produced and recorded album, as well as the first not to be produced by longtime collaborator Dave Fridmann.

== Critical reception ==
Professional ratings
Aggregate scores
Source	Rating
Metacritic	75/100
Review scores
Source	Rating
AllMusic	4/5 stars
Drowned in Sound	7/10
The Guardian	4/5 stars
Pitchfork	7.0/10
PopMatters	7/10 stars
The Line of Best Fit	8/10 stars
Télérama	ffff

Upon its release, The Light in You received generally positive reviews from music critics. At Metacritic, which assigns a normalized rating out of 100 to reviews from mainstream critics, the album has received an average score of 75 based on 14 reviews.

== Track listing ==
No.	Title	Length
1.	"The Queen of Swans"	3:58
2.	"Amelie"	3:57
3.	"You've Gone with So Little for So Long"	3:30
4.	"Central Park East"	6:13
5.	"Emotional Free Fall"	4:16
6.	"Coming up for Air"	3:16
7.	"Autumn's in the Air"	4:31
8.	"Are You Ready?"	3:47
9.	"Sunflower"	3:28
10.	"Moth Light"	3:43
11.	"Rainy Day Record"	3:41

== Personnel ==
Mercury Rev

- Jonathan Donahue — lead vocals, acoustic and electric guitars, transistor organ, bells, chimes, orchestral arrangements
- Grasshopper — Cabronita electric guitar, harmony vocals, electric sitar, National steel mandolin, clarinet, Moon-glo organ, vibraphone, Perico percussion, Gretsch kit drums; lead vocals (track 10)

Additional personnel

- Jennifer Donovan — violin
- Jesse Chandler — pianos, harmony vocals, flutes, woodwinds
- Anthony Molina — bass, harmony vocals, piano
- Scott Petito — Hofner bass, electric sitar, electric guitar
- Jason Miranda — drums
- Hari Prakaash — gong
- Ken Stringfellow — vocals
- Aden Stringfellow — vocals
- Vanessa Gray — vocals (tracks 1, 5, 11)
- Alise Marie — vocals (tracks 3, 4, 6)
- Rebecca Bortman — vocals (track 8)
- Nicole Atkins — vocals (tracks 10, 11)

== Charts ==
Chart (2015)	Peak position
Belgian Albums (Ultratop Flanders)	77
Belgian Albums (Ultratop Wallonia)	152
Dutch Albums (Album Top 100)	70
French Albums (SNEP)	66
Irish Albums (IRMA)	53
UK Albums (OCC)	39
