= Boces =

Studio album by Mercury Rev
- Released: June 1, 1993
- Recorded: 1992–1993
- Genres: Neo-psychedelia, noise pop
- Length: 53:55
- Labels: Beggars Banquet (UK); Columbia (US)
- Producer: Mercury Rev

Mercury Rev chronology
Yerself Is Steam (1991)	Boces (1993)	See You on the Other Side (1995)

Boces is the second album by American indie rock band Mercury Rev, released on June 1, 1993. It was their final album with original frontman David Baker, who was asked to leave shortly after the supporting tour concluded. The title is derived from the Boards of Cooperative Educational Services (BOCES) system of vocational schools in New York.

During a performance at Lollapalooza on the supporting tour, the band were forced off the stage for playing too loud.

== Music ==
Boces contains music that has been characterized as "dreaming musing[s]" as well as "thrashy freakouts." Some of the material has been categorized as jazz-pop. The album's instrumentation additionally incorporates flutes, harps, brass and choir.

== Reception ==
Professional ratings
Review scores
Source	Rating
AllMusic	4.5/5 stars
Entertainment Weekly	B+
NME	8/10
Q	3/5 stars
The Rolling Stone Album Guide	3/5 stars
Select	4/5
Uncut	8/10

Heather Phares of AllMusic wrote that "With Boces, Mercury Rev took everything that made Yerself Is Steam such an impressive debut and made their second album even more so...Mercury Rev never released another album as joyfully, unselfconsciously creative as Boces; after chief weirdo David Baker departed, the band pursued other fascinating directions, but this album remains one of the highest points of its career."

== Track listing ==
All tracks are written by Mercury Rev according to the liner notes; actual writing credits from the ASCAP Repertory are listed below.

No.	Title	Writer(s)	Length
1.	"Meth of a Rockette's Kick"	David Baker, Jimy Chambers, Jonathan Donahue, Dave Fridmann, Sean Mackowiak, Suzanne Thorpe	10:29
2.	"Trickle Down"	Baker, Chambers, Donahue, Fridmann, Mackowiak, Thorpe	5:04
3.	"Bronx Cheer"	Baker, Donahue, Fridmann	2:49
4.	"Boys Peel Out"	Baker, Donahue, Fridmann, Mackowiak	4:28
5.	"Downs Are Feminine Balloons"	Baker, Donahue, Fridmann, Mackowiak, Thorpe	6:29
6.	"Something for Joey"	Baker, Chambers, Fridmann, Mackowiak, Thorpe	4:06
7.	"Snorry Mouth"	Baker, Chambers, Donahue	10:55
8.	"Hi-Speed Boats"	Baker, Fridmann, Mackowiak	4:00
9.	"Continuous Drunks and Blunders"	Baker, Donahue, Fridmann, Mackowiak	0:48
10.	"Girlfren"	Baker, Chambers, Donahue, Fridmann, Mackowiak, Thorpe	4:41

== Personnel ==
Mercury Rev

- David Baker – Vocals
- Jonathan Donahue – Silver Pickup Guitar, Vocals between Ventolin hits
- Jimy Chambers – Drumming, AtlasSweepstakes
- Grasshopper – Dither Guitar, Licorice Stick
- Suzanne Thorpe – Rooster Tail Bass Flute, Chevron Fife
- Dave Fridmann – Bass Explore, Exhaled band-with Magnetics

Additional musicians

- Julie Baker – violin
- C. Gavazzi – French horn
- Jim Burgess – trombone
