= Snowflake Midnight =

Studio album by Mercury Rev
- Released: September 29, 2008
- Recorded: Catskill Mountains
- Genre: Alternative rock, electronica
- Length: 41:29
- Label: V2; Yep Roc
- Producer: Dave Fridmann, Mercury Rev

Mercury Rev chronology
The Secret Migration (2005)	Snowflake Midnight (2008)	The Light in You (2015)

Professional ratings
Review scores
Source	Rating
AllMusic	link
Culturedeluxe	7/10 link
The Guardian	link
The Independent	link
Pitchfork	6.3/10 link
Planet Sound	5/10
Twisted Ear	link

Snowflake Midnight is the seventh studio album from Mercury Rev. It was released on September 29, 2008 in the UK, and September 30 in the US.

Made available on the same day from the band's website was a "companion" album, Strange Attractor. This eleven-track instrumental album was given away free as an MP3 download. The vinyl edition of "Snowflake Midnight" includes the "Strange Attractor" album as a bonus LP.

== Track listing ==
=== Snowflake Midnight ===
All songs written by Jonathan Donahue, Sean "Grasshopper" Mackowiak and Jeff Mercel.

1. "Snowflake in a Hot World" – 3:58
2. "Butterfly's Wing" – 4:06
3. "Senses on Fire" – 3:30
4. "People are So Unpredictable (There's No Bliss Like Home)" – 6:40
5. "October Sunshine" – 2:12
6. "Runaway Raindrop" – 5:55
7. "Dream of a Young Girl as a Flower" – 7:55
8. "Faraway from Cars" – 3:19
9. "A Squirrel and I (Holding On...and Then Letting Go)" – 3:54

=== Singles ===
- Senses on Fire / Butterfly's Wing (Remixes) (October 27, 2008)
1. "Senses on Fire" (Fujiya & Miyagi Remix)
2. "Senses on Fire" (James Holden Remix)
3. "Butterfly's Wing" (ISAN Alien Adoption Remix)
4. "Butterfly's Wing" (Carlos Anthony Molina "4 on the Flux" Mix)

=== Strange Attractor ===
1. "Love Is Pure"
2. "Taken Up into Clouds, Changed and Rained Down"
3. "Pure Joie de la Solitude"
4. "Persistence and the Apis Mellifera"
5. "Fable of a Silver Moon"
6. "Loop Lisse, Loop"
7. "In My Heart, a Strange Attractor"
8. "Incident on Abeel Street"
9. "Af Den Fader Kommer Den Sol"
10. "Because Because Because"
11. "Nocturne for Norwood"

== Personnel ==
Mercury Rev

- Jonathan Donahue – performing, recording, mixing
- Sean "Grasshopper" Mackowiak – performing, recording, mixing
- Jeff Mercel – performing, recording, mixing

Additional musicians

- Carlos Anthony Molina – additional bass guitar
- Jason Miranda – additional drums

Production

- Dave Fridmann – producer, mixing
- Scott Hull – mastering
- Scott Petito – additional engineering
- Frank Moscowitz – additional engineering
