= Yerself Is Steam =

Studio album by Mercury Rev
- Released: May 14, 1991
- Recorded: 1990–1991
- Genres: Neo-psychedelia; psychedelic rock; art pop; art punk; shoegaze
- Length: 49:19 (UK); 57:09 (US)
- Labels: Mint Films/Jungle Records; Columbia
- Producer: Mercury Rev

Mercury Rev chronology
Yerself Is Steam (1991)	Boces (1993)

Yerself Is Steam is the debut studio album by the American indie rock band Mercury Rev, released on May 14, 1991. The title is a mondegreen of the phrase "your self-esteem", and is taken from a recurring lyric in opening track "Chasing a Bee". "Car Wash Hair" was released as a single to follow the album. "Very Sleepy Rivers" is a reference to a previous lyric in the album, "your eyes are rivers, they give me shivers." A music video for "Chasing a Bee" was shot at an abandoned infectious disease hospital that once housed Mary Mallon on North Brother Island in the Bronx, and was directed by Jim Spring and Jens Jurgensen.

Dean Wareham of Galaxie 500 made a guest appearance on "Car Wash Hair" and assisted with recording, allegedly after bassist and engineer Dave Fridmann spent the band's advance on a holiday package.

== Critical reception ==
Professional ratings
Review scores
Source	Rating
AllMusic	4.5/5 stars
Chicago Tribune	3.5/4 stars
NME	8/10
Pitchfork	9.3/10
Q	4/5 stars
Record Collector	3/5 stars
The Rolling Stone Album Guide	3.5/5 stars
Select	5/5
Sounds	4/5 stars
Uncut	9/10

In Rolling Stone, David Fricke labeled Yerself Is Steam "slacker beat at its most extreme and hypnotic, a marvel of tortured self-absorption and compelling dissonance".

"Music dictated not by logic but by intuition," wrote AllMusic critic Jason Ankeny in a retrospective review, "Yerself Is Steam is an album at war with itself, split by its desire to achieve both melodic pop bliss and white-noise transcendence within the same space; it succeeds brilliantly, avant-bubblegum fuel injected by fits and flourishes of prismatic chaos." In 2016, Pitchfork ranked the record at number 16 on its list of "The 50 Best Shoegaze Albums of All Time", with staff writer Stuart Berman commenting that "Yerself Is Steam is really a shoegaze album in the inverse: Where their fuzz-pedaling peers obliterated the human presence in rock music through a cloud of distortion, Mercury Rev foregrounded the claustrophobic, panicky unease of being trapped inside it."

== Track listing ==
All tracks are written by Mercury Rev (credited to David Baker, Jonathan Donahue, Sean Mackowiak, and Suzanne Thorpe in the ASCAP Repertory).

No.	Title	Length in artwork (*)	Length
1.	"Chasing a Bee"	4:27	7:11
2.	"Syringe Mouth"	3:27	4:04
3.	"Coney Island Cyclone"	3:27	2:37
4.	"Blue and Black"	4:27	6:00
5.	"Sweet Oddysee of a Cancer Cell t' th' Center of Yer Heart"	5:27	7:41
6.	"Frittering"	4:27	8:48
7.	"Continuous Trucks and Thunder Under a Mother's Smile""	2:27	0:43
8.	"Very Sleepy Rivers"	12:27	12:15; **13:15
9.	"Car Wash Hair (The Bee's Chasing Me)" (hidden track**)		6:44

=== Formatting notes ===
- (*) The back cover deliberately lists erroneous run times. They are listed above in italics.
- (**) On the Columbia/Sony Music CD edition.
- On the Columbia/Sony Music CD release, "Very Sleepy Rivers" is divided amongst tracks 8 through 98. Track 8 contains the first 7:15 of the song, while the rest is split amongst the following ninety four-second tracks, netting the song an additional minute in the process. The audio slowly fades out around track 83 and, around track 88, a voice starts saying 'pick' repeatedly with some barely audible laughter. During this quieter section, an infrasonic signal was mixed underneath. The unusual method of splitting the track was included on Pitchfork's 2010 list of "ten unusual CD-era gimmicks". "Car Wash Hair" follows as track 99 on this pressing.

== Lego My Ego ==
In 1992, Mint Films/Jungle re-released Yerself is Steam with a bonus LP/CD entitled Lego My Ego. The title is a parody of the Eggo waffles ad slogan, and is taken from a piece of voice tape at the start of "Frittering," where one musician tells another to "let go of my fucking ego" after they tell him how to play a song. It consists of non-album tracks and a John Peel session from August 1991. Mint Films released another edition in 2007 consisting of both CDs plus an all-region DVD of the videos for "Chasing a Bee" and "Car Wash Hair."

=== CD version ===
All tracks are written by Mercury Rev, except "If You Want Me to Say" by Sly Stone and "Shhh/Peaceful" by Miles Davis. "Blood on the Moon" has no writer's credit, but is presumably also written by Grasshopper.

No.	Title	Source	Length
1.	"If You Want Me to Stay"	A-side single, March 1992	4:08
2.	"Shhh/Peaceful" / "Very Sleepy Rivers"	BBC live, June 1992	14:52
3.	"Frittering"	BBC Peel session, 27 Aug 1991	5:18
4.	"Coney Island Cyclone"	BBC Peel session, 27 Aug 1991	3:20
5.	"Car Wash Hair"	A-side single, 1991	7:25
6.	"Syringe Mouth"	BBC Peel session, 27 Aug 1991	3:11
7.	"Blood on the Moon"	1990 motion picture Moonbuggy	8:21
8.	"Chasing a Bee (Inside a Car)"	BBC Peel session, 27 Aug 1991	10:09

Notes

- 1 is a cover of the Sly and the Family Stone song, originally released on the A-side of a 7" single in March 1992 by the Rough Trade Singles Club.
- 2 was recorded live by the BBC Mobile Recording Studio at Finsbury Park, London, June 1992. "Shhh/Peaceful" is a cover of the Miles Davis song (from In a Silent Way), which is only quoted briefly in the introduction.
- 3, 4, 6 and 8 are from a Peel Session recorded on August 27, 1991, produced by Mike Robinson, and first broadcast on October 5, 1991. 8 is "Chasing a Bee" with some changed lyrics. Some releases title it "Chasing a Girl (Inside a Car)," which is sung in the title line of this version. The liner notes comment, "Guitars should be much louder, but what can you do?"
- 5 is the same recording as the 1991 single version released by Mint Films, but with some extra material crossfaded in at the end. The whole album has unusual tapes (mostly voice) between all the songs.
- 7 is credited as being the "original theme from the 1991 motion picture 'Moonbuggy,' a film by Howard Nelson," and performed by Grasshopper.

=== LP version ===
Due to time constraints, the LP version eliminates the two previously released singles ("If You Want Me to Stay" and "Car Wash Hair"), and sequences all of the BBC Session tracks together on Side B.

Side A

1. "Shhh/Peaceful" / "Very Sleepy Rivers" – 14:52
2. "Blood on the Moon" – 8:21

Side B

1. "Frittering" – 5:18
2. "Coney Island Cyclone" – 3:20
3. "Syringe Mouth" – 3:11
4. "Chasing a Bee (Inside a Car)" – 10:09

== Radio Whipped promotional edition ==
Sony/Columbia released a promotional double-CD version of the album in 1992. The first disc consists of the US version of the album. The second disc is the US "Chasing a Bee" CD single. A "Radio Whipped Sticker" on the back of the CD jewelbox numbers the nine tracks on the album as A, B, C, D, E, F, U, C, and K, and the six tracks of the single as:

A. "Chasing a Bee" – 7:09
B. "If You Want Me to Stay" – 3:37
S. "Coney Island Cyclone" – 2:40
U. "Frittering" – 4:26
R. "Syringe Mouth" – 3:09
D. "Chasing a Girl (Inside a Car)" – 6:56

S, U, R, and D are the Peel Session recordings, and are actually one continuous track for 17:53. The run times for B, S, U and D are shorter than on Lego My Ego because they don't contain the unusual tape material that was added to these songs on it.

== Personnel ==
- David Baker – vocals
- Jonathan Donahue – silver pickup guitar, vocals
- Grasshopper – unafon guitar reels
- Suzanne Thorpe – point red flute
- Dave Fridmann – bass explore, majestic bellowphone, additional engineering
- Jimy Chambers – drumming, blue-line

== More ==
- C. Gavazzi – trumpet on "Car Wash Hair"
- Dean Wareham – additional vocals and production on "Car Wash Hair"
- Keith Cleversley – engineer
- Kristin Peterson – photography
- Mooneyham – artwork
