= All Is Dream =

Studio album by Mercury Rev
- Released: August 27, 2001
- Genres: Dream pop; psychedelic rock; chamber pop
- Length: 49:45
- Label: V2
- Producers: Dave Fridmann; Grasshopper; Jonathan Donahue; Jeff Mercel

Mercury Rev chronology
Deserter's Songs (1998)	All Is Dream (2001)	The Secret Migration (2005)

Singles from All Is Dream
- 1. "Nite and Fog" Released: 6 October 2001; 2. "The Dark Is Rising" Released: 26 January 2002; 3. "Little Rhymes" Released: 27 July 2002

All Is Dream is the fifth studio album by American rock band Mercury Rev. It was released in the United Kingdom on August 27, 2001, in France on August 28, 2001, and in the United States on September 11, 2001. The album's front cover features half of the 1991 painting Breakthrough Dreaming by artist and mystic Jennifer Hathaway.

== Background and recording ==
Following the critical and commercial breakthrough of 1998's Deserter's Songs, producer and bassist Dave Fridmann became an in-demand producer in his own right and, along with flautist Suzanne Thorpe, stepped back from full-time involvement in the band, while drummer Jimy Chambers left outright; this left Jonathan Donahue and Grasshopper as the band's remaining core going into the follow-up record. In the course of promoting Deserter's Songs, the band drew the attention of veteran arranger and producer Jack Nitzsche, and plans were made for Nitzsche to produce Mercury Rev's next album; however, Nitzsche died on August 25, 2000, the week before recording was due to begin. Rather than abandon Nitzsche's intended orchestral approach, the band went on to work with Tony Visconti, who provided string and other orchestral arrangements in his place; All Is Dream has since been described as, in part, an attempt to imagine what Nitzsche's sonic vision for the band might have sounded like.

The album was recorded over roughly a year, from early 1999 into 2001, in intermittent sessions following an extended break the band took after touring for Deserter's Songs.

== Release ==
All Is Dream was released in the United States on September 11, 2001, the day of the September 11 attacks. In a 2020 interview marking the album's 4-CD reissue, Donahue reflected that the record's release was largely lost in the events of that day: "It melted into the background like everything else did, and was brushed under by the necessity of something bigger that day. ... Had it come out the week before or the week after, we wouldn't be talking about it like this." He noted the coincidence of the album's release date, its title, and its lead single "The Dark Is Rising" being especially difficult to discuss even years afterward.

== Critical reception ==
Professional ratings
Aggregate scores
Source	Rating
Metacritic	80/100
Review scores
Source	Rating
AllMusic	4.5/5 stars
Blender	4/5 stars
The Guardian	3/5 stars
Los Angeles Times	3.5/4 stars
NME	8/10
Pitchfork	8.5/10
Q	4/5 stars
Rolling Stone	3.5/5 stars
Spin	7/10
Uncut	4.5/5 stars

All Is Dream received generally positive reviews from music critics. Q listed it as one of the best 50 albums of 2001.

== Track listing ==
All songs written by Jonathan Donahue, Sean "Grasshopper" Mackowiak and Jeff Mercel.

1. "The Dark Is Rising" – 4:52
2. "Tides of the Moon" – 5:13
3. "Chains" – 4:22
4. "Lincoln's Eyes" – 7:09
5. "Nite and Fog" – 3:58
6. "Little Rhymes" – 5:13
7. "A Drop in Time" – 4:20
8. "You're My Queen" – 2:33
9. "Spiders and Flies" – 4:11
10. "Hercules" – 7:52

Japanese bonus track

11. "Cool Waves" – 3:10

=== Limited edition bonus CD-ROM ===
The album was also released as a limited edition featuring a CD-ROM with the following tracks:

1. "Saw Song (Live)" (Audio track)
2. "Hercules (Live)" (Audio track)
3. "Little Rhymes (Live)" (Audio track)
4. "Nite and Fog" (Video)
5. "The Dark Is Rising" (Video)
6. "Documentary Footage" (Video)

== Personnel ==
Mercury Rev

- Jonathan Donahue – words and acoustic guitar
- Grasshopper – moth-light guitars
- Dave Fridmann – bass guitar and Mellotron
- Jeff Mercel – drums and piano

Additional musicians

- Tony Visconti – string arrangement (3), additional orchestration (7), Mellotron flutes (9)
- Mary Gavassi Fridmann – soprano vocals
- Justin Russo – Rhodes piano
- Jason Russo – electric guitar
- Rex L White – pedal steel
- Suzanne Thorpe – flute
- Joel Eckhaus – bowed saw
- Bethany Crescini – child vocals
- Katie Fox, Amy Helm and Deb Curley – female vocals
- Marc Guy – French horn
- Larry Packer – solo violin
- Gregor Kitzis – violins
- Sarah Adams, Martha Mooke, Laura Seaton – violas
- Maxine Neuman – cello
- Aaron Hurwitz – Hammond organ

== Charts ==
Chart performance for All Is Dream
Chart (2001)	Peak position
Australian Albums (ARIA)	36
Belgian Albums (Ultratop Wallonia)	46
Danish Albums (Hitlisten)	38
French Albums (SNEP)	27
German Albums (Offizielle Top 100)	78
Norwegian Albums (VG-lista)	4
Swedish Albums (Sverigetopplistan)	55
UK Albums (Official Charts)	11

== Reissue ==
In late 2020, Cherry Red Records released an expanded box set edition of All Is Dream, including a live "In Concert" disc compiled from European and American shows in 2001 and 2002, and a separate disc of the band's Black Sessions performance recorded for French radio station France Inter in Paris in 2001. In the reissue's sleeve notes, Donahue described the album as "a weird astral album musically," adding that "the symbolism lyrically runs many layers down and deep – different coloured layers of rock, soil and ash on an archaeology dig."

== In other media ==
In his album Falling Off the Bone, comedian Todd Barry recounts that, while in Manhattan on September 11, a friend of his in the crowd recognized Barry and told him, "The new Mercury Rev album is out."
