= 5 Shells =

2012 film

- Directed by: Paul S. Myers
- Written by: Paul S. Myers
- Produced by: Jordan Grady; Victoria Lubomski; Paul S. Myers
- Starring: Kelsey Hutton; Eve Kozikowski
- Music by: Jeff Mercel
- Production company: Melodramatic Eagle Productions
- Distributed by: BrinkVision
- Release date: March 9, 2012
- Running time: 93 minutes

5 Shells is a 2012 American apocalyptic drama film written and directed by Paul S. Myers and starring Kelsey Hutton and Eve Kozikowski.

== Plot ==
Following a global economic collapse resulting in a post apocalyptic world, Matti (Kelsey Hutton) and her older sister Joslyn (Eve Kozikowski) are hiding beneath the floor as an armed intruder searches their house. After finding their parents killed, Matti plans on traveling to their grandmother's house, taking a shotgun and five shells she found scattered near her father's body. Maddi uses one shell for target practice before leaving the home. The sisters travel, staying in abandoned places and almost drown crossing a river. Maddi begins having recurrent dreams involving a yellow brick road and other imagery from The Wizard of Oz, whose original book she often reads to her sister.

Maddi shoots a rabbit for food, then are approached by two men, Frank (Chad Brummett) and Stan (Lincoln Mark), who offer their assistance to the sisters. In private Stan tells Matti to run away when they get the opportunity but decline to give a reason. They drive off in Stan's minivan. At night the two girls stay outside as the men sleep in the vehicle. Matti insists on them leaving and throws the Oz book into the fire as Joslyn lays down, refusing to leave.

In the morning Frank sends Matti and Stan searching for firewood. Once alone, he sexually assaults Joslyn. The others return, Matti shooting into the air to get Frank's attention. As the sisters and Stan drive away, Frank shoots his pistol at them then begins walking down the road. After running out of gas, the three teens walk, finding a house occupied by Gage (Craig Myers) who offers them shelter for the night.

Some time after the three leave the house, Frank breaks in, tortures and interrogates Gage to reveal the directions he has given the teens. He tracks them down to a town, abandoned and overgrown by weeds, then to the house of the sister's grandmother which is also abandoned. He pistol-whips Joslyn as she rushes to attack him, then chases the others. About to kill Stan, he is shot by Matti.

Joslyn insists on returning to their home. Matti finds a copy of Oz, only to throw it away when she sees Joslyn and Stan kissing. That night she thinks about shooting Stan and finds a porn magazine in his belongings which she reads in private. The next night Matti passes around a bottle of scotch whisky, spilling her portions until the others are drunk. As Joslyn sleeps she seduces Stan. In the morning Joslyn, seeing her sister's panties on the ground and Stan's pants down at his ankles, confronts the two. Matti admits having sex with him, afraid that the two of them would leave her alone. As Joslyn taunts her sister, Matti shoots, killing both.

She runs back to Gage's house, only to find him dead. She then sees her parents and sister at the table. A moment later she opens her eyes, finding herself under the floor of her house.

== Cast ==
- Kelsey Hutton as Matti
- Eve Kozikowski as Joslyn
- Chad Brummett as Frank
- Lincoln Mark as Stan
- Craig Myers as Gage
- Jordan Grady as Father
- Cyd Schulte as Mother

== Production ==
5 Shells was filmed on location in New Mexico. It was partially funded by a fully–pledged Kickstarter campaign.

== Release ==
The film was released to video on demand and DVD on Jul 16, 2013.

== Reception ==
Film Bizarro finds the bleak film of rape and murder refreshing in the minimalistic approach and psychological focus of a post apocalyptic world although it would have been stronger had it been a shorter film. Quiet Earth agrees that although having competent cinematography and dialog, the film would have been better as a short film.
