= Superet =

American rock band

- Origin: Los Angeles, California
- Genres: Indie rock; synth-pop
- Years active: 2016–present
- Members: Matt Blitzer
- Past members: Alex Fischel; Sam Kauffman-Skloff; Patrick Kelly; Isaac Tamburino
- Website: superet.music

Superet is an American indie rock solo project based in Los Angeles, California, fronted by singer-songwriter Matt Blitzer. It was originally formed as a five-piece band in 2016, before its other members left in 2021. Superet debuted in 2017 with the single "Pay It Later" ahead of their self-titled EP, followed by two studio albums: How To Work A Room (2019) and Loving Lies (2025).

== History ==
In the early 2010s, vocalist and guitarist Matt Blitzer, multi-instrumentalist Isaac Tamburino, bassist Patrick Kelly, keyboardist Alex Fischel, and drummer Sam Kauffman-Skloff all attended the California Institute of the Arts. They played music together at the school before each graduated or stopped collaborating. Fischel was recruited by the band Spoon, while Blitzer and Kelly joined the band Harriet. The group later reunited to form a band on February 14, 2016, naming it Superet after a local Los Angeles church of the same name. They subsequently adapted several songs written during their college years into songs for the band, including the song "Half Life". Superet released their debut single "Pay It Later" on May 15, 2017, simultaneously touring as an opening act for Dreamcar. Superet released a music video for the song on June 1, followed by the single "Who Is This Guy" and its video on July 31. They released their third single "Receiver" on September 12 and published a video for the song on September 17, which was included on several editorial playlists by Apple Music. All three would be featured on Superet's self-titled debut EP, which was independently released on October 30 alongside its fourth single "Loving the Animal". Superet was positively received by critics upon release, with praise directed towards its balance of "dark intensity" and "daydream expressionism" alongside its minimalistic music videos.

The band released the standalone single "Bang My Drum" on September 24 2018, which received inclusion in Apple Music's "Best of the Week" playlist. This was followed by another standalone single, "Half Life", on November 12. Superet began touring as Caroline Rose's opening act simultaneously with the release of their maxi single "Comes as Relief" on February 22, 2019, produced by Dave Fridmann and mastered by Greg Calbi. An acoustic recording was released as a single on March 15, preceding a remix of the track by KWKA, Fridmann's son, on March 22. They released their second maxi single "YDS2M" on April 5, and its acoustic recording on April 12. Their third maxi single "Bone Bag" was released on May 3. All nine songs from the singles appeared on their debut album How To Work A Room, released through Rob the Rich Recordings on May 17, 2019. Ahead of the album, Superet began touring as the opening act of I Dont Know How but They Found Me's Night Heat Tour, publishing a performance video of "YDS2M" to YouTube on June 14. The band released an acoustic rendition of "Bone Bag" as a single on June 28, followed by a rendition of "Gash on the Cheek" on July 19. The band later performed at the 2019 edition of Austin City Limits Music Festival.

On December 2, 2021, Blitzer announced that every other member of Superet had left the band, due to a lack of financial stability. As a solo act, Blitzer wrote the songs "Prism" and "Pink House" during the COVID-19 pandemic. He released "Prism" featuring Olivia Kaplan as a single in January 2022, followed shortly after by "Pink House". He recruited two touring members to open for IDKHow's Thought Reform Tour, additionally coming out during the duo's set to perform a verse of "Nobody Likes the Opening Band". Blitzer composed the theme song for the sitcom St. Denis Medical, followed by the release of his second studio album Loving Lies (2025).

== Influences ==
Living together at the California Institute of the Arts, the original lineup of Superet were simultaneously influenced together by the same music. While working on their 2017 self-titled debut EP, they cited Gary Numan, David Bowie, Brian Eno, David Byrne, Roxy Music, Talking Heads, ESG, Delta 5, Cocteau Twins, and R. Stevie Moore as influences. Superet has been an opening act for Dreamcar, Gang of Youths, Caroline Rose, I Dont Know How but They Found Me, Broken Social Scene, and Sparks.

== Band members ==
Current members

- Matt Blitzer – lead vocals, guitars (2016–present); keyboards (2019–present), bass, drums, percussion (2021–present)

Former members

- Isaac Tamburino – guitars, keyboards, percussion (2016–2021)
- Patrick Kelly – bass (2016–2021)
- Alex Fischel – keyboards (2016–2021)
- Sam Kauffman-Skloff – drums (2016–2021)

== Discography ==
List of studio albums
Title	Album details
How To Work A Room	Released: May 17, 2019; Format: Digital download, vinyl
Loving Lies	Released: July 16, 2025; Format: Digital download, CD, vinyl

List of extended plays
Title	Album details
Superet	Released: October 30, 2017; Format: Digital download
Live at Bob Baker	Released: December 8, 2025; Format: CD

List of demo albums
Title	Album details
How To Work A Room Demos	Released: December 8, 2025; Format: CD

List of singles as lead artist
Title	Year	Album
"Pay It Later"	2017	Superet
"Who Is This Guy"	2017	Superet
"Receiver"	2017	Superet
"Loving the Animal"	2017	Superet
"Bang My Drum"	2018	Non-album singles
"Half Life"	2018	Non-album singles
"Comes as Relief" ("Blue Age" / "Stockholm Syndrome")	2019	How To Work A Room
"Comes as Relief" (Acoustic Version)	2019	Non-album singles
"Comes as Relief" (KWKA Remix)	2019	Non-album singles
"YDS2M" ("Farrington Pond" / "Shapeless Place")	2019	How To Work A Room
"YDS2M" (Acoustic Version)	2019	Non-album single
"Bone Bag" ("A Gash on the Cheek" / "Some Bright Lights")	2019	How To Work A Room
"Bone Bag" (Acoustic Version)	2019	Non-album singles
"A Gash on the Cheek" (Acoustic Version)	2019	Non-album singles
"Prism"	2022	Non-album singles
"Pink House"	2022	Non-album singles
"Was I On Your Mind?" ("The Stars Don't Give a Shit" / "Jerks")	2025	Loving Lies
"Cargo Pants"	2025	Loving Lies
"Loving Lies"	2025	Loving Lies
