= Jeff Mercel =

American musician

Jeff Mercel is an American multi-instrumentalist, composer, and studio musician, best known for his time in the indie rock band, Mercury Rev.

== Early life and education ==
Jeff Mercel attended SUNY Fredonia, graduating with a Bachelor of Arts in 1993. In 1996, Mercel played drums with the band Grand Mal on their self-titled album released by Number Six Records.

== Time with Mercury Rev ==
Mercel first played with Mercury Rev on their breakthrough 1998 album, "Deserter's Songs", playing drums, both in studio and on tour. For the band's next album, 2001's "All is Dream", his role expanded to pianos, contributing to the arranging, mixing, and producing. He stayed with Mercury Rev for the next nine years, playing on the albums "The Secret Migration" (2005), "Hello Blackbird" (2006), "Back to Mine" (2006), "Snowflake Midnight" (2008), and "Strange Attractor" (2008). In 2011 Mercel rejoined with the band for a world tour to promote the release of the double disc reissue of "Deserter's Songs."

== Work as a composer ==
During his time with Mercury Rev, Mercel helped score the feature-length film, Bye Bye, Blackbird (2005). In 2010, Mercel left working with Mercury Rev full-time to pursue work as a composer. His work has appeared in numerous television shows such as CSI: Crime Scene Investigation on CBS, and Showtime's This American Life. His work can also be heard in commercials for BMW, and a Got Milk? ad campaign featuring Salma Hayek.

Mercel has also worked in film scoring the animated short, Marvin (2010) starring Steve Coogan, and the live action shorts Daniel (2010), Chaser (2012), and Sam (2012). In 2012 he composed the music for the feature film "5 Shells."

== Discography ==
Album	Band	Year
Grand Mal	Grand Mal	1996
Deserter's Songs	Mercury Rev	1998
All is Dream	Mercury Rev	2001
Secret Migration	Mercury Rev	2005
Hello Blackbird	Mercury Rev	2006
The Essential Mercury Rev	Mercury Rev	2006
Snowflake Midnight	Mercury Rev	2008
Strange Attractor	Mercury Rev	2008

== Filmography ==
Bye, Bye, Blackbird	Feature	2005
Marvin	Short	2010
Daniel	Short	2010
Chaser	Short	2010
Sam	Short	2012
5 Shells	Feature	2012
