= David Baker (singer) =

American singer

David Baker is an American musician best known as a founding member and the former lead singer of the indie rock band Mercury Rev, formed in Buffalo, New York in the late 1980s, and after as vocalist for Variety Lights.

After leaving Mercury Rev in 1994, he released the critically acclaimed album World under the alias Shady which featured contributions from members of a variety of leading British and Irish alternative acts, including Rollerskate Skinny, Th' Faith Healers, The Boo Radleys and Swervedriver. Later, he formed the band Variety Lights, a collaboration with Will MacLean.

== Career ==
=== Mercury Rev ===
He is prevalent on Mercury Rev's first two (according to The Quietus "heavy psychedelic") albums Yerself Is Steam (1991) and Boces (1993) and all of the concurrent singles and Peel Sessions. When the band became popular in the UK after the success of Yerself Is Steam, Baker became their main spokesman when dealing with both British music journalists and record labels. According to fellow band founder Jonathan Donahue, "it was David Baker who really helped us navigate the press, we hadn't done interviews before...David was really the one who helped us understand what actually was happening [to us] in '91".

Unhappy with the band's more melodic and conventional musical direction after Boces, Baker left Mercury Rev sometime before 1994. Mercury Rev's sound changed considerably after the departure of Baker, whose deep voice and unconventional style was replaced by Donahue's much higher-pitched vocals. Although there were tensions with Donahue at the time, they remained on good terms, and Donahue continues to speak highly of him. In a 2013 interview with The Quietus, Baker said that he "had been wanting to leave, to be happier. So it wasn’t like some big fall out. It’s a hard one to talk about, but we’re fine, [even if] we’re not making records together."

=== Shady ===
Baker produced the album World under the name Shady. The album featured contributions from artists such as Adam Franklin from Swervedriver, Martin Carr from The Boo Radleys, Jimi Shields from Rollerskate Skinny, Bill Whitten from St. Johnny and Grand Mal, and Sooyoung Park from Seam. A music video for the song "Narcotic Candy" was directed by Jim Spring and Jens Jurgensen. He then moved to Chicago, where he is a studio engineer, and has produced a number of bands, such as Mazinga Phaser from Denton, TX, Comet, from Mesquite, TX, and Marvelkind from Chicago.

=== Variety Lights ===
Baker formed the band Variety Lights with electronic musician Will MacLean and released their debut album Central Flow on Fire Records in June 2012. That August, their video for "Feeling All Alone" was released. This was followed by a UK tour in 2013, including headlining slot of Chicago Psych Fest V in 2014. According to The Guardian, Baker and MacLean "bonded over their love of analogue synths, making music with effected guitars, vintage keyboard, and chained "80s-era Midi expanders".
