= The Secret Migration =

Studio album by Mercury Rev
- Released: January 24, 2005
- Recorded: Six Hours Studios, Tarbox Observatory
- Genre: Alternative rock
- Length: 44:28
- Label: V2 Records
- Producer: Dave Fridmann, Mercury Rev

Mercury Rev chronology
All Is Dream (2001)	The Secret Migration (2005)	Snowflake Midnight (2008)

Singles from The Secret Migration
- 1. "In A Funny Way" Released: 17 January 2005; 2. "Across Yer Ocean" Released: 21 March 2005; 3. "Secret for a Song" Released: June 2005 (Promo)

The Secret Migration is the sixth album by the alternative rock band Mercury Rev, released on January 24, 2005 in the UK (and a day later in the US). A limited edition of the American release of the album featured special packaging and included a bonus disc featuring b-sides, rarities, and live tracks.

== Reception ==
Professional ratings
Aggregate scores
Source	Rating
Metacritic	76/100
Review scores
Source	Rating
AllMusic	2.5/5 stars
Entertainment Weekly	B−
The Guardian	4/5 stars
Los Angeles Times	3/4 stars
Mojo	4/5 stars
NME	6/10
Pitchfork	5.5/10
Rolling Stone	3.5/5 stars
Spin	B+
Uncut	4/5 stars

The Secret Migration received mixed reviews from the majority of critics.

== Track listing ==
All songs written by Mercury Rev.

1. "Secret for a Song" – 4:01
2. "Across Yer Ocean" – 3:20
3. "Diamonds" – 3:51
4. "Black Forest (Lorelei)" – 4:46
5. "Vermillion" – 4:07
6. "In the Wilderness" – 2:32
7. "In a Funny Way" – 4:02
8. "My Love" – 4:14
9. "Moving On" – 1:20
10. "The Climbing Rose" – 3:19
11. "Arise" – 3:49
12. "First-Time Mother's Joy (Flying)" – 3:31
13. "Down Poured the Heavens" – 1:36

=== American limited edition bonus disc ===
1. "The Black Swan" – 4:13
2. "My Love" (Live) – 4:04
3. "Afraid" – 3:42
4. "Black Forest (Lorelei)" (Live) – 4:44
5. "Observatory Crest" – 3:45
6. "Streets of Laredo" – 2:43
7. "Diamonds" (Live) – 3:29
8. "Mirror for a Bell" – 3:11

== Personnel ==
Mercury Rev

- Jonathan Donahue
- Grasshopper (Sean Mackowiak)
- Jeff Mercel
- Carlos Anthony Molina

Additional musicians

- Mary Gavazzi Fridmann
- Rich Robinson
- Adam Peters
- Adam Widoff

== Charts ==
Chart performance for The Secret Migration
Chart (2005)	Peak position
Australian Albums (ARIA)	66
Belgian Albums (Ultratop Flanders)	27
Belgian Albums (Ultratop Wallonia)	48
Danish Albums (Hitlisten)	38
French Albums (SNEP)	30
Italian Albums (FIMI)	44
Norwegian Albums (VG-lista)	27
UK Albums (OCC)	16
