= Mercury Rev =

American indie rock band

- Mercury Rev performing at the Enmore Theatre in Sydney Australia, August 2024

Background information
- Origin: Buffalo, New York, U.S.
- Genres: Indie rock; chamber pop; neo-psychedelia; avant-pop; psychedelic pop
- Years active: 1989–present
- Labels: Jungle; Rough Trade; Columbia; Beggars Banquet; Work; V2; Yep Roc; Partisan; Bella Union
- Members: Jonathan Donahue; Grasshopper; Marion Genser; Jesse Chandler
- Past members: David Baker; Jimy Chambers; Dave Fridmann; Jeff Mercel; Adam Snyder; Suzanne Thorpe
- Website: mercuryrev.com

Mercury Rev is an American rock band formed in 1989 in Buffalo, New York, with Jonathan Donahue (vocals and guitar) and Sean "Grasshopper" Mackowiak (guitar/clarinet/other instruments) as the only constant members. The band's music has incorporated indie rock, psychedelic rock and American roots, amongst other forms. Mercury Rev have been closely associated with The Flaming Lips, and the two bands have shared historical ties.

== History ==
=== Formation (1989–1990) ===
Mercury Rev was formed in 1989 by students at the University at Buffalo, partially inspired by the drone music of composer/media studies professor Tony Conrad (then working as a teacher at the university, and a strong artistic influence on co-founder Grasshopper). The line-up gradually coalesced around Donahue, Grasshopper, vocalist/keyboard player David Baker and flute/French horn player Suzanne Thorpe; subsequent additions were bass guitarist/in-house producer Dave Fridmann (a music production student at SUNY Fredonia, who began by recording the band and subsequently added enough bass guitar and sonic effect parts to make himself a full band member), and a late addition in the form of drummer Jimy Chambers (who joined towards the end of initial recording sessions to "effectively serve as the frame around Mercury Rev's musical splatter").

The band was initially formed to score its members' student films, and had a loose playing and recording existence. The band's initial music was a blend of experimental, psychedelic rock, drone and noise rock. David Baker recalls "we were in Buffalo, sitting there thinking, there's no hope of us being a band, we're not going to be Guns N' Roses. What we did wasn't considered real, because it wasn't being covered by Spin or Rolling Stone, so we could just be whatever we wanted to be. We'd take the microphone and record pots and pans or guitar and make our own little world. I mean, we knew the context, we knew who Bowie was, we knew who all the bands were, but we didn't put them with us. We were just making music. It was, 'Us? Are we in a band?' Well, none of us live in the same town, we just meet in the studio and have a great time together doing stuff."

At this early stage, several members also had other musical interests which prevented consistent Mercury Rev activity. Donahue worked as a gig promoter for other bands' concerts in Buffalo, which brought him into contact with The Flaming Lips in 1989: he then toured with them as guitar technician before formally joining as lead guitarist in time to play on their 1990 album In a Priest Driven Ambulance.

=== The David Baker years: Yerself Is Steam and Boces (1991–1993) ===
Mercury Rev's debut album was 1991's Yerself Is Steam. Once referred to as "soundtracks to actual movies, composed by a band that didn't really exist," it originated as the collective's attempts to devise and perform musical scores for student films showing in local galleries, or for existing nature documentaries which they'd watch on television and jam to. It was followed by the "Car Wash Hair" single, a more straightforward song typifying the band's early merging of psychedelic rock and noise rock. During this year, the band had begun to solidify and concentrate on more sustained effort. Yerself Is Steam had been completed during Donahue's breaks from Flaming Lips activity in tour and in Oklahoma: following creative disagreements with the band's frontman Wayne Coyne, Donahue left The Flaming Lips in mid-1991, shortly after recording the Hit to Death in the Future Head album. This enabled him to return to Buffalo and concentrate full-time on Mercury Rev. Fridmann, meanwhile, had produced the band's early recordings as part of his university coursework, meaning that Mercury Rev could access and use the SUNY Fredonia studios in off-hours and at cheap rates.

As they began to play live (and across a greater spread of venues and events), the band began to make a name for themselves as creators of powerfully experimental, often chaotic psychedelic music, with Pitchfork later recalling "in their formative years, Mercury Rev really did sound like a careening bus headed towards a fiery crash — one where half the people on board were frantically fighting each other for control of the wheel, and the other half were in the back obliviously singing nursery rhymes as the whole bucket of bolts went up in flames... [It was] less a melding of disparate sounds than a battle royale of oppositional ideologies: order and anarchy, ecstasy and terror, purity and perversion."

Although Dave Fridmann remained the band's bass player, co-producer and co-composer in the studio, he often had to step back from his role as live bass player due to increasing demands on his time as a record producer. Bassist John DeVries substituted for Fridmann at an increasing number of live shows, including an Ireland-and-England tour in the autumn of 1992, with Gerald Menke taking over live bass duties by 1993.

Despite considerable critical acclaim, Mercury Rev's early releases gave them little more than cult popularity, although thanks to early British press interest they secured a prestigious slot at the Reading Festival for their third-ever gig, and later appeared on the smaller second stage at some 1993 Lollapalooza stops.

The band's second record, Boces, was recorded during 1992 and 1993, with the band's collective creative approach in full flow. David Baker later recalled "[Jimy Chambers] was really into a lot of '60s music; Dave Fridmann, his background was more jazz. He used to put Steely Dan on a lot of the time. Suzanne was of the mind set of trying to conquer all these guitars with her flute. I thought people should be able to put their thing into the mix because it is better to have everything in... The drummer was writing a song, the bass player was writing a song and it would get blown up by someone else. Jonathan was a major song writer and I did a lot but everybody got to contribute... There were pre-ideas and songs brought in but I don't think anybody would have been allowed to tell people what to do. They knew their song was going to get blown up. Maybe you don't bring in a song that you weren't ready for somebody to blow up."

Later in 1993, the band embarked on a tour to support the release of Boces, including some Lollapalooza shows during the summer. At the Lollopalooza gig at Greenwood Village, Colorado on June 26, the band were forced off the stage for being too loud and "out of control" following an objection by the Mayor of Denver.

David Baker parted company with Mercury Rev after the Boces tour, citing musical and personal disputes.

Baker remained on good terms with the band, and would later record albums as Shady and Variety Lights. With his departure, the thematically darker and musically experimental features of Mercury Rev began to disappear, with the music gradually shifting over time towards a melodic, ornate sound.

=== Transitional period: See You on the Other Side (1995–1997) ===
The band's first post-Baker album, See You on the Other Side (1995) contained a variety of styles, including a sprawling psychedelic opening track and noise rock numbers like "Young Man's Stride" (for which a music video was released), but also more melodic songs, such as "Sudden Ray of Hope". By this time the live band included organist Adam Snyder and brothers Jason and Justin Russo of psychedelic rock band Hopewell (as bassist and keyboardist respectively).

That year, the group also recorded and released the album, Paralyzed Mind Of The Archangel Void, under the moniker "Harmony Rockets". The album featured a single forty minute track of mostly instrumental psychedelic improvised music. It was rated four and half stars, out of five, by AllMusic. (Fourteen years later, in 2009, the group would revisit it for performance in the Don't Look Back concert series.)

See You on the Other Side failed to sell well, a situation which helped to trigger a destructive period for the band during which they fell into debt, came into conflict with their record label, lost their manager and lawyers, and parted company with drummer Jimy Chambers. Donahue and Grasshopper, in particular, were failing to communicate with each other and struggling with their individual drug and relationship problems.

While Grasshopper retreated to a Jesuit guest house in upstate New York, Donahue began to listen to records of children's music and to write simple melodies on piano (in contrast to the band's former psychedelic/electric compositional approach). At the same time, he was invited to guest on a Chemical Brothers track called "The Private Psychedelic Reel". This in turn inspired him to repair his musical and personal friendship with Grasshopper.

=== Breakthrough albums: Deserter's Songs and All Is Dream (1998–2001) ===
Mercury Rev relocated to Donahue's birthplace of Kingston, New York, and began recording in the Catskill Mountains. The personnel for the album was a loose core of Jonathan Donahue, Grasshopper and Suzanne Thorpe, joined by Dave Fridmann and by former drummer Jimy Chambers, and augmented by local musicians (including two former members of The Band: Garth Hudson and Levon Helm). The involvement of the latter shifted the band's musical focus closer to roots and acoustic music. At the secondary recording and mixing stage, Donahue, Grasshopper and Fridmann opted not to use their previous method of distorted guitar and electronic overdubs and instead began to use strings, horns and woodwinds, resulting in more of a chamber pop sound while retaining a psychedelic tinge.

The 1998 release of the resulting Deserter's Songs album met with acclaim, and made Mercury Rev unexpected pop stars. In the UK, NME magazine made Deserter's Songs their Album of the Year. Donahue's earnest, high-pitched vocals and concentration on relatively concise, melodic songs gave the band's material an entirely new feel and much increased popularity (Deserter's Songs spawned three UK Top 40 singles: "Delta Sun Bottleneck Stomp", "Opus 40" and "Goddess on a Hiway").

Both Suzanne Thorpe and Jimy Chambers left Mercury Rev following the recording of the album, with the tours promoting Deserter's Songs featuring the return of the Russo brothers and Adam Snyder (although all three would depart the live band during 2000). Jeff Mercel, who'd played on Deserter's Songs, also joined as touring drummer, and would soon become a full band member. Although Thorpe would return as a guest player for All is Dream, she would subsequently concentrate on academic research and emerge as a Deep Listening instructor, university lecturer and electro-acoustic improviser, as well as becoming part of "pirate-punk" band The Wounded Knees. Thorpe has also returned for occasional band revisitations of the Harmony Rockets project, including one at the 2009 All Tomorrow's Parties festival in England. Chambers would later form the band Odiorne.

By 2001, the band's nucleus was Grasshopper, Donahue and Mercel, with Fridmann remaining as co-producer and studio bass player. The All Is Dream album was issued in 2001 and became the band's highest-charting album in the UK to date (number 11). It included "Little Rhymes", "Nite and Fog" and "The Dark is Rising," which reached number 16 in the UK Singles Chart. David Bowie producer Tony Visconti arranged strings and provided Mellotron parts for the album, which also featured contributions from Jason and Justin Russo. However, the Russo brothers did not join the band on tour this time, their places being taken by bass player Paul Dillon and by multi-instrumentalist Carlos Anthony Molina on keyboards, augmented by second keyboard player Michael Schirmer.

=== The Secret Migration, Snowflake Midnight and others (2004–2014) ===
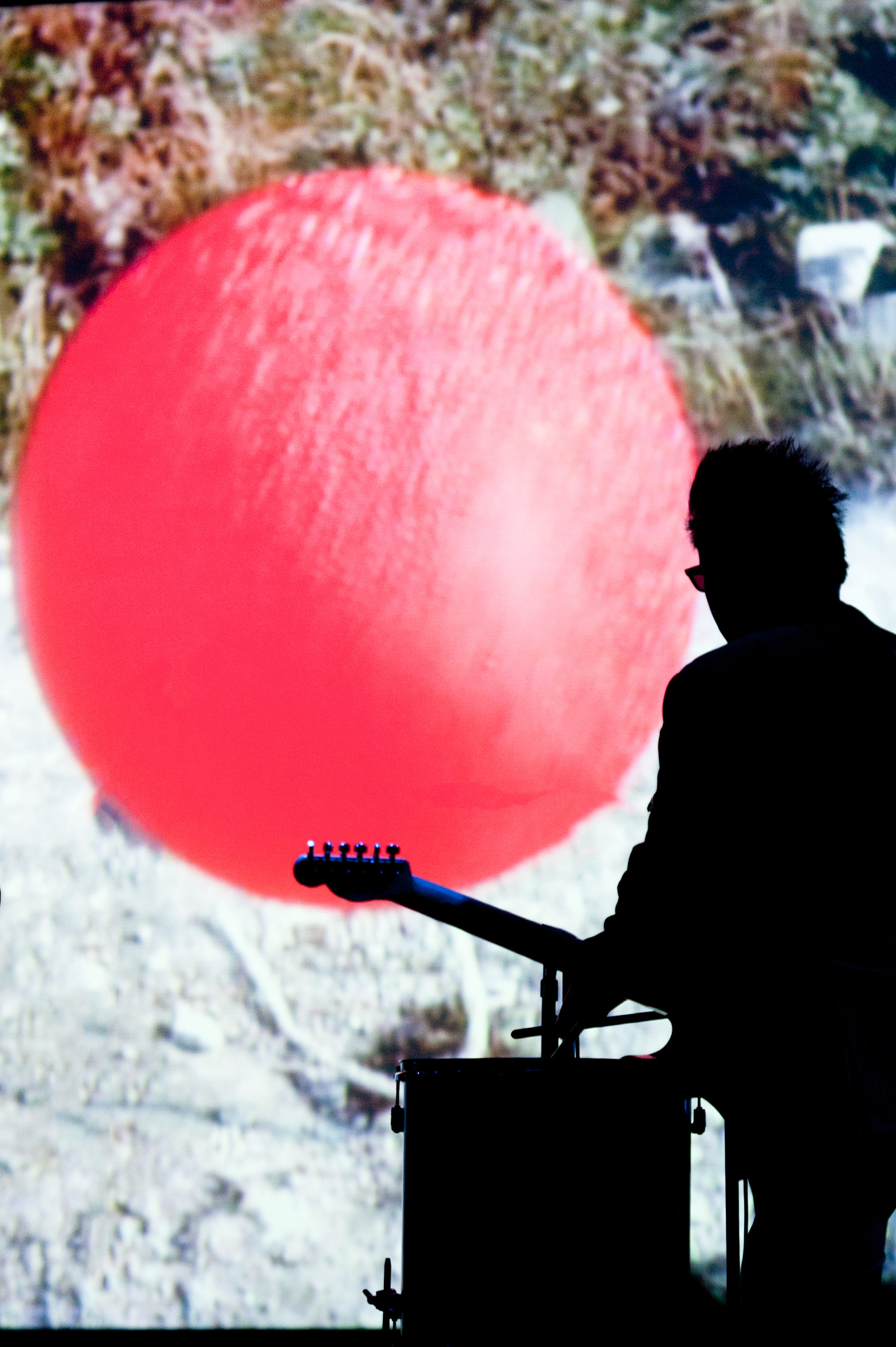
Film Music Live Improvisation for the short movie The Red Balloon

Carlos Anthony Molina had become a full Mercury Rev member by the time of Mercury Rev's fifth album, The Secret Migration, which was released on January 24, 2005, and on which he played both keyboards and bass guitar. The album featured the UK Top 40 single "In A Funny Way" (number 28). The album itself reached number 16 in the UK Albums Chart. Jeff Mercel moved to keyboards for the subsequent tours, with his place on drums being taken on live dates by Jason Miranda.

The Secret Migration was followed up in 2006, by a compilation album, The Essential Mercury Rev: Stillness Breathes 1991-2006, and the film soundtrack album Hello Blackbird. The band released a pair of albums on September 29, 2008: Snowflake Midnight, and a free MP3 album of instrumentals, Strange Attractor, following which Jeff Mercel left the band (although he would rejoin them on tour in 2011 to promote the double-disc reissue of Deserter's Songs). Former Midlake keyboardist Jesse Chandler was recruited to Mercury Rev in 2014.

=== Recent activity: The Light in You, Bobbie Gentry's The Delta Sweete Revisited, Born Horses (2015–present) ===
Mercury Rev's first studio album in seven years, The Light in You, was released on October 2, 2015, through Bella Union. It reached number 39 on the UK albums chart. This was the first Mercury Rev album not to be co-produced by Dave Fridmann. At this point the band were officially a duo of Donahue and Grasshopper, with Molina, Miranda and Chandler still regularly contributing but as part of a set of support musicians.

Although Molina and Miranda's involvement with the band had ceased by 2016, Chandler had become a full member of Mercury Rev by the time that the band released Bobbie Gentry's The Delta Sweete Revisited in February 2019. This was a reworking of Bobbie Gentry's 1968 album The Delta Sweete, featuring instrumentation by Mercury Rev and a different female guest singer on each song. Lucinda Williams, actress Carice van Houten, Beth Orton and Norah Jones were among the vocalists. The album achieved a Top 40 position in the UK chart, peaking at number 32.

2021 saw further changes to the Mercury Rev line-up, with keyboard player Marion Genser joining the band as a full-fledged member.

On June 4, 2024, Mercury Rev announced their latest studio album, Born Horses, which was released on September 6, 2024. The first single from the album, "Patterns," was also released on the day of the announcement. The band's line-up changed again that year, with Joe Magistro taking over on drums, and guitarist/flugelhorn player J.B. Meijers (who'd already made some band contributions in 2018) joining.

== Musical style ==
Heather Phares of AllMusic explained that stylistically, Mercury Rev "evolved from avant-pop pranksters into purveyors of rootsy, majestic psych-pop," describing their style as an amalgamation of shoegaze, noise pop, psychedelic, and experimental music. She noted that on the band's third album See You on the Other Side, it "added adventurous free jazz excursions and lullaby-like melodies."

== Band members ==
=== Current members ===
- Jonathan Donahue – vocals, guitar (1989–present)
- Sean "Grasshopper" Mackowiak – guitar, keyboards, clarinet, vocals, Tettix Wave Accumulator (1989–present)
- Marion Genser – keyboards, harmonium, synths (2021–present)
- Jesse Chandler – keyboards, sax, flute (2019–present; 2014-2019 touring)

=== Current touring musicians ===
- Chris Heitzman – bass (2021–present)
- J.B. Meijers – guitar, flugelhorn (2018; 2024–present)
- Joe Magistro – drums (2024–present)

=== Former members ===
- David Baker – vocals (1989–1993)
- Jimy Chambers – drums (1989–1999)
- Dave Fridmann – bass (1989–2001; not touring 1993-2001), producer (1989–2008)
- Jeff Mercel – drums, piano (1998–2008; 2011 tour)
- Adam Snyder – keyboards (1995–2000)
- Suzanne Thorpe – flute (1989–1999)

=== Former touring musicians ===
- John DeVries – bass (1993)
- Gerald Menke – bass (1993)
- Justin Russo – keyboards (1998–2015)
- Jason Russo – bass (1994–2001)
- Michael Schirmer – keyboards (2001–2002)
- Paul Dillon – bass (2001–2002)
- Carlos Anthony Molina – keyboards (2001–2002), bass (2004–2016)
- Jason Miranda – drums (2005–2016)
- Simon Raymonde
- Don McGreevy – drums (2022)

== Discography ==
=== Studio albums ===
List of albums, with selected details and peak chart positions
Title	Album details	Peak chart positions									Sales	Certifications
Title	Album details	US Heat	AUS	BEL (FL)	BEL (WA)	FRA	NOR	SCO	SWE	UK	Sales	Certifications
Yerself Is Steam	Released: May 14, 1991; Label: Jungle/Columbia; Format: cassette, CD, digital download, LP, streaming	—	—	—	—	—	—	—	—	200		
Boces	Released: June 1, 1993; Label: Beggars Banquet; Format: cassette, CD, digital download, LP, streaming	—	—	—	—	—	—	—	—	43		
See You on the Other Side	Released: September 19, 1995; Label: Work/Beggars Banquet; Format: cassette, CD, digital download, LP, streaming	—	—	—	—	—	—	—	—	108		
Deserter's Songs	Released: September 29, 1998; Label: V2; Format: cassette, CD, digital download, LP, streaming	—	85	—	—	36	15	32	38	27	US: 49,000; UK: 100,000	BPI: Gold
All Is Dream	Released: September 11, 2001; Label: V2; Format: cassette, CD, digital download, LP, streaming	17	36	46	—	27	4	10	55	11	UK: 100,000	BPI: Gold
The Secret Migration	Released: May 17, 2005; Label: V2; Format: cassette, CD, digital download, LP, streaming	—	66	27	48	30	27	15	—	16		
Snowflake Midnight	Released: September 30, 2008; Label: V2/Yep Roc; Format: CD, digital download, LP, streaming	14	—	48	94	150	—	56	—	52		
The Light in You	Released: October 2, 2015; Label: Bella Union; Format: CD, digital download, LP, streaming	—	—	58	69	66	—	34	—	39		
Bobbie Gentry's The Delta Sweete Revisited	Released: February 8, 2019; Label: Partisan; Format: CD, digital download, LP, streaming	2	—	51	90	184	—	9	—	32		
Born Horses	Released: September 6, 2024; Label: Bella Union; Format: CD, digital download, LP, streaming	—	—	200	—	—	—	13	—	44		

=== Compilations ===
List of albums, with selected details and peak chart positions
Title	Album details	Peak chart positions
Title	Album details	UK
The Essential Mercury Rev: Stillness Breathes 1991-2006	Released: October 2, 2006; Label: v2; Format: CD, digital download, LP, streaming	176

=== Soundtracks ===
List of albums, with selected details and peak chart positions
Title	Album details	Peak chart positions
Title	Album details	UK Sound.
Hello Blackbird (Original Motion Picture Soundtrack)	Released: January 1, 2006; Label: Cherry Red Records; Format: CD, digital download, LP, streaming	41

=== Other commercial releases ===
List of commercial releases, with selected chart positions
Title	Release details
Lego My Ego	Released: 1992; Labels: Mint Films; Format: CD, LP, cassette
Paralysed Mind of the Archangel Void (as Harmony Rockets)	Released: 1995; Labels: Big Cat; Format: CD, LP
Strange Attractor	Released: September 30, 2008; Labels: Excelsior Melodies; Format: download, streaming
Inner Autumn Outer Space	Released: December 4, 2012; Labels: Excelsior Melodies; Format: download, streaming

=== Live albums ===
List of commercial releases, with selected chart positions
Title	Release details
The Complete Peel Sessions	Released: January 1, 2009; Labels: Universal; Format: download, CD, streaming
Beyond The Swirling Clouds - An Evening At Barrowland Ballroom	Released: January 5, 2011; Labels: Excelsior Melodies; Format: download, streaming
Live in Brixton '92	Released: December 4, 2012; Labels: Excelsior Melodies; Format: download, streaming
Live SXSW 1999	Released: March 1, 2016; Labels: Excelsior Melodies; Format: download, streaming
Whisky a Go-Go '95	Released: March 1, 2016; Labels: Excelsior Melodies; Format: download, streaming
Madrid Live '95	Released: March 1, 2016; Labels: Excelsior Melodies; Format: download, streaming
Phoenix Festival '93	Released: March 3, 2017; Labels: Excelsior Melodies; Format: download, streaming
Malaga '07	Released: March 3, 2017; Labels: Excelsior Melodies; Format: download, streaming
Istanbul 2011	Released: March 3, 2017; Labels: Excelsior Melodies; Format: download, streaming
Buffalo '95	Released: March 3, 2017; Labels: Excelsior Melodies; Format: download, streaming

=== Other appearances ===
- 2002 - Instant Karma - A Tribute to John Lennon (song: "Isolation")
- 2004 - The Late Great Daniel Johnston: Discovered Covered
- 2006 - Back to Mine (compiled by Mercury Rev, includes exclusive new track "Cecilla's Lunar Exposé")

=== Singles ===
Title	Year	Peak chart positions				Album
Title	Year	BEL (FL)	BEL (WA)	UK	UK Indie	Album
"Car Wash Hair"	1991	—	—	—	—	Yerself Is Steam
"If You Want Me to Stay"	1992	—	—	—	—	Yerself Is Steam
"Chasing a Bee"	1992	—	—	—	—	Yerself Is Steam
"The Hum Is Coming from Her" (a.k.a. "Girlfren")	1993	—	—	—	—	Boces
"Bronx Cheer"	1993	—	—	—	—	Boces
"Something for Joey"	1993	—	—	—	—	Boces
"Everlasting Arm/Dead Man"	1994	—	—	91	—	See You on the Other Side
"Goddess on a Hiway"	1998	— (Note: "Goddess on a Hiway" did not enter the Flanders Ultratop 50, but peaked at number 18 on the Ultratip chart.)	—	26	3	Deserter's Songs
"Delta Sun Bottleneck Stomp"	1998	—	—	26	7	Deserter's Songs
"Opus 40"	1999	—	—	31	6	Deserter's Songs
"Holes"	1999	—	—	—	—	Deserter's Songs
"Nite and Fog"	2001	—	—	47	7	All Is Dream
"The Dark is Rising"	2002	—	—	16	2	All Is Dream
"Little Rhymes"	2002	—	—	51	7	All Is Dream
"In a Funny Way"	2005	—	—	28	7	The Secret Migration
"Across Yer Ocean"	2005	—	—	54	8	The Secret Migration
"Senses on Fire"	2008	—	—	— (Note: "Senses on Fire" did not enter the UK Singles Chart, but peaked at number 68 on the UK Physical Singles Chart.)	—	Snowflake Midnight
"Butterfly's Wing"	2008	—	—	—	—	Snowflake Midnight
"The Queen of Swans"	2015	—	—	—	—	The Light in You
"Are You Ready?"	2015	—	—	—	—	The Light in You
"Rainy Day Record"	2016	—	—	— (Note: "Rainy Day Record" did not enter the UK Singles Chart, but peaked at number 60 on the UK Physical Singles Chart.)	—	The Light in You
"Sermon" (featuring Margo Pierce)	2018	—	—	—	—	Bobbie Gentry's The Delta Sweete Revisited
"Big Boss Man" (featuring Hope Sandoval)	2018	—	—	—	—	Bobbie Gentry's The Delta Sweete Revisited
"Okolona River Bottom Band" (featuring Norah Jones)	2019	— (Note: "Okolona River Bottom Band" did not enter the Flanders Ultratop 50, but entered the Ultratop "Extra Tips".)	— (Note: "Okolona River Bottom Band" did not enter the Wallonia Ultratop 50, but entered the Ultratop "Extra Tips".)	—	—	Bobbie Gentry's The Delta Sweete Revisited
"Tobacco Road" (featuring Susanne Sundfør)/"Jesseye' Lisabeth" (featuring Phoebe Bridgers)	2019	—	—	—	—	Bobbie Gentry's The Delta Sweete Revisited
"Louisiana Man" (featuring Erika Wennerstrom)	2019	—	—	—	—	non-album single
"Patterns"	2024	—	—	—	—	Born Horses
"Ancient Love"	2024	—	—	—	—	Born Horses
"A Bird of No Address"	2024	—	—	—	—	Born Horses
"—" denotes releases that did not chart.

=== Other contributions ===
- Acoustic 05 (2005, Echo) - "First Time Mothers Joy"
- Ciao My Shining Star: The Songs of Mark Mulcahy (2009, Mezzotint) - "Sailors and Animals" (Miracle Legion cover)

== See also ==
- List of dream pop artists
