= Philadelphia (soundtrack) =

1994 film soundtrack album

Soundtrack album by Howard Shore
- Released: January 1994
- Recorded: 1993
- Length: 40:34
- Label: Epic Soundtrax
- Producers: Glen Brunman; Gary Goetzman; Jonathan Demme

Professional ratings
Review scores
Source	Rating
Billboard	(favorable)
Music Week	3/5 stars
NME	7/10

Philadelphia (Music from the Motion Picture) is the soundtrack album to the 1993 film Philadelphia. The album features an original score composed by Howard Shore. The album was released through Epic Soundtrax in January 1994.

== Development ==
The director originally contacted Neil Young to record a rock anthem to open the film, but after viewing a cut of it, Young was inspired to write a slow and quiet ballad instead. Demme decided Young's song would be more appropriate for the ending of the film, so he approached Bruce Springsteen to write an anthem. Springsteen viewed the opening montage, which at the time featured Neil Young's "Southern Man" as the temp track. Like Young, he was inspired to create something quieter; in this case, a beat-driven recording that became "Streets of Philadelphia." However, Springsteen's first contribution, "Tunnel of Love," was rejected by Demme. Even though Springsteen knew it was not what Demme originally wanted, he sent it to him anyway. When Demme and his wife were moved by the recording, she advised him that it was likely the direction he should be going and he agreed.

The album was re-released in 2008 in France only as a CD/DVD combo pack with the film itself, containing the same track listing (catalogue number 88697 322052 under both Sony BMG Music Entertainment and Sony Classical labels).

== Track listing ==
No.	Title	Artist(s)	Length
1.	"Streets of Philadelphia"	Bruce Springsteen	3:56
2.	"Lovetown"	Peter Gabriel	5:29
3.	"It's in Your Eyes"	Pauletta Washington	3:46
4.	"Ibo Lele (Dreams Come True)"	RAM	4:15
5.	"Please Send Me Someone to Love"	Sade	3:44
6.	"Have You Ever Seen the Rain?"	Spin Doctors	2:41
7.	"I Don't Wanna Talk About It"	Indigo Girls	3:41
8.	"La mamma morta" (From the Opera Andrea Chénier)	Maria Callas	4:53
9.	"Philadelphia"	Neil Young	4:06
10.	"Precedent"	Howard Shore	4:03

=== Weekly charts ===
Weekly chart performance for Philadelphia
Chart (1994–95)	Peak position
Australian Albums (ARIA)	4
Austrian Albums (Ö3 Austria)	1
Belgian Albums (Ultratop Wallonia)	49
Canada Top Albums/CDs (RPM)	4
Dutch Albums (Album Top 100)	12
European Albums (European Top 100 Albums)	3
German Albums (Offizielle Top 100)	3
Hungarian Albums (MAHASZ)	11
New Zealand Albums (RMNZ)	7
Norwegian Albums (VG-lista)	16
Swedish Albums (Sverigetopplistan)	36
Swiss Albums (Schweizer Hitparade)	4
US Billboard 200	12

2010 weekly chart performance for Philadelphia
Chart (2010)	Peak position
Belgian Albums (Ultratop Wallonia)	49

=== Year-end charts ===
1994 year-end chart performance for Philadelphia
Chart (1994)	Position
Australian Albums (ARIA)	88
Austrian Albums (Ö3 Austria)	4
Canada Top Albums/CDs (RPM)	21
European Albums (European Top 100 Albums)	16
German Albums (Offizielle Top 100)	17
Swiss Albums (Schweizer Hitparade)	15
UK Compilations Albums (OCC)	33
US Billboard 200	69

=== Certifications and sales ===
Certifications and sales for Philadelphia
Region	Certification	Certified units/sales
Australia (ARIA)	Gold	35,000^{^}
Austria (IFPI Austria)	Platinum	50,000^{*}
Belgium (BRMA)	Platinum	50,000^{*}
Canada (Music Canada)	3× Platinum	300,000^{^}
France (SNEP)	2× Gold	200,000^{*}
Germany (BVMI)	Gold	400,000
Spain (Promusicae)	Platinum	100,000^{^}
Switzerland (IFPI Switzerland)	Platinum	50,000^{^}
United Kingdom (BPI)	Gold	100,000^{^}
United States (RIAA)	Platinum	1,160,000
Summaries
Europe (IFPI)	Platinum	1,000,000^{*}
^{*} Sales figures based on certification alone.^{^} Shipments figures based on certification alone.

== Accolades ==
Award	Category	Recipient(s)	Result
20/20 Awards	Best Original Song	"Philadelphia"; Music and Lyrics by Neil Young	Nominated
20/20 Awards	Best Original Song	"Streets of Philadelphia"; Music and Lyrics by Bruce Springsteen	Won
Academy Awards	Best Original Song	"Philadelphia"; Music and Lyrics by Neil Young	Nominated
Academy Awards	Best Original Song	"Streets of Philadelphia"; Music and Lyrics by Bruce Springsteen	Won
ASCAP Film and Television Music Awards	Top Box Office Films	Howard Shore	Won
ASCAP Film and Television Music Awards	Most Performed Songs from Motion Pictures	"Streets of Philadelphia" – Bruce Springsteen	Won
Golden Globe Awards	Best Original Song – Motion Picture	"Streets of Philadelphia"; Music and Lyrics by Bruce Springsteen	Won
Grammy Awards	Record of the Year	"Streets of Philadelphia" – Bruce Springsteen	Nominated
Grammy Awards	Song of the Year	"Streets of Philadelphia" – Bruce Springsteen	Won
Grammy Awards	Best Male Rock Vocal Performance	"Streets of Philadelphia" – Bruce Springsteen	Won
Grammy Awards	Best Rock Song	"Streets of Philadelphia" – Bruce Springsteen	Won
Grammy Awards	Best Song Written Specifically for a Motion Picture or for Television	"Streets of Philadelphia" – Bruce Springsteen	Won
MTV Movie Awards	Best Song from a Movie	Bruce Springsteen – "Streets of Philadelphia"	Won
MTV Video Music Awards	Best Video from a Film	Bruce Springsteen – "Streets of Philadelphia"	Won
