= Dave Fridmann =

American record producer

- Born: David Lawrence Fridmann
- Origin: Buffalo, New York, U.S.
- Occupations: Record producer; audio engineer; musician
- Instruments: Bass; keyboards; guitar; vocals
- Years active: 1989–present
- Formerly of: Mercury Rev
- Website: davefridmann.com

David Lawrence Fridmann is an American record producer and musician. He was the founding bassist of the band Mercury Rev, which he was a member of from 1989 to 2001, although he stopped touring with the band in 1993.

As a producer, he is best known for albums such as The Flaming Lips' The Soft Bulletin (1999) and Yoshimi Battles The Pink Robots (2002), Sleater-Kinney's The Woods (2005) and MGMT's Oracular Spectacular (2007).

== Career ==
From 1990 onwards he co-produced most releases by Mercury Rev and The Flaming Lips. Other bands he has worked with include Weezer, Saxon Shore, Neon Indian, Wolf Gang, Ammonia, Ed Harcourt, Sparklehorse, Creeper Lagoon, Café Tacuba, Creaming Jesus, Elf Power, Mogwai, Thursday, Longwave, Mass of the Fermenting Dregs, The Delgados, Low, OK Go, Phantom Planet, Gemma Hayes, Ava Luna, Tame Impala, Goldrush, Tapes 'n Tapes, Baroness, MGMT and Magdalena Bay.

As a musician, Fridmann was the bassist and a founding member of Mercury Rev. He gave up his role as a touring member of the band in 1993 to concentrate on producing other artists. In 2001, Fridmann was included on MOJO's 100 Sonic Visionaries list and was described as "the Phil Spector of the Alt-Rock era". In 2007, he received a Grammy for The Flaming Lips' At War With The Mystics at the 49th Annual Grammy Awards (Best Engineered Album, Non-Classical). In 2010, three Fridmann-produced albums were listed on the Rolling Stone 100 Best Albums of The Decade: MGMT's Oracular Spectacular, The Flaming Lips' Yoshimi Battles The Pink Robots, and Sleater-Kinney's The Woods.

Fridmann is an occasional faculty member of SUNY Fredonia, teaching sound recording techniques in the Fredonia School of Music.

In 2017, Fridmann became the director for the Western New York Alumni Drum and Bugle Corps, where he plays the bass drum. The group disbanded in 2022.

== Discography ==
=== As producer ===
Release year	Album	Artist
1990	In a Priest Driven Ambulance	The Flaming Lips
1991	Yerself Is Steam	Mercury Rev
1992	Hit To Death In The Future Head	The Flaming Lips
1993	Boces	Mercury Rev
1994	Syrup Macrame	Radial Spangle
1994	Chaos For The Converted	Creaming Jesus
1995	See You on the Other Side	Mercury Rev
1995	Clouds Taste Metallic	The Flaming Lips
1996	Revelater	Jennyanykind
1996	Pinkerton (engineer)	Weezer
1997	Zaireeka	The Flaming Lips
1997	Souls For Sale	Verbena
1998	Deserter's Songs	Mercury Rev
1998	Eleventh Avenue	Ammonia
1999	XIV	Home
1999	The Soft Bulletin	The Flaming Lips
1999	Hope and Adams	Wheat
1999	School Girl Distortional Addict	Number Girl
1999	A Dream in Sound	Elf Power
1999	Come on Die Young	Mogwai
2000	The Great Eastern	The Delgados
2000	Sappukei	Number Girl
2001	Rock Action	Mogwai
2001	It's a Wonderful Life	Sparklehorse
2001	All Is Dream	Mercury Rev
2001	Without a Plan	Bodega
2002	Yoshimi Battles the Pink Robots	The Flaming Lips
2002	Num-Heavymetallic	Number Girl
2002	Romantica	Luna
2002	Hate	The Delgados
2003	The Strangest Things	Longwave
2003	Songs for Dustmites	Steve Burns
2003	Per Second, Per Second, Per Second... Every Second	Wheat
2003	Night on My Side	Gemma Hayes
2003	Drveće i rijeke (Trees and Rivers)	Pips, Chips & Videoclips
2003	Cuatro Caminos	Café Tacuba
2003	Bad Timing	Grand Mal
2004	Phantom Planet	Phantom Planet
2005	The Exquisite Death of Saxon Shore	Saxon Shore
2005	The Woods	Sleater-Kinney
2005	The Secret Migration	Mercury Rev
2005	The Great Destroyer	Low
2006	The Philosophy of Velocity	Brazil
2006	Dreamt for Light Years in the Belly of a Mountain	Sparklehorse
2006	A City by the Light Divided	Thursday
2006	At War With The Mystics	The Flaming Lips
2007	Some Loud Thunder	Clap Your Hands Say Yeah
2007	Drums and Guns	Low
2007	Oracular Spectacular	MGMT
2008	Zazen Boys 4	Zazen Boys
2008	Walk It Off	Tapes 'N Tapes
2008	Snowflake Midnight	Mercury Rev
2008	Christmas on Mars	The Flaming Lips
2009	Embryonic	The Flaming Lips
2009	Eating Us	Black Moth Super Rainbow
2009	Common Existence	Thursday
2010	Innerspeaker (mixing)	Tame Impala
2010	The Wild Trapeze	Brandon Boyd
2010	Of the Blue Colour of the Sky	OK Go
2011	Era Extraña	Neon Indian
2011	180/365	OK Go
2011	Suego Faults	Wolf Gang
2011	Flux Outside	Royal Bangs
2011	No Devolución	Thursday
2012	Lonerism (mixing)	Tame Impala
2012	Hello Hum	Wintersleep
2012	In the Belly of the Brazen Bull	The Cribs
2013	MGMT	MGMT
2013	The Terror	The Flaming Lips
2014	They Want My Soul	Spoon
2014	Only Run	Clap Your Hands Say Yeah
2014	Hungry Ghosts	OK Go
2014	Dizzy Heights	Neil Finn
2015	English Graffiti	The Vaccines
2015	Permanence	No Devotion
2015	Purple	Baroness
2017	Oczy Mlody	The Flaming Lips
2017	Hot Thoughts	Spoon
2017	The Tourist	Clap Your Hands Say Yeah
2017	Every Country's Sun	Mogwai
2017	Mismo Sitio, Distinto Lugar	Vetusta Morla
2018	Little Dark Age	MGMT
2018	Human Music	Solomon Grey
2018	Marauder	Interpol
2018	This Is Eggland	The Lovely Eggs
2019	Gold & Grey	Baroness
2019	How To Work A Room	Superet
2020	I Am Moron	The Lovely Eggs
2020	Love Is An Art	Vanessa Carlton
2020	American Head	The Flaming Lips
2021	As the Love Continues	Mogwai
2024	Loss Of Life	MGMT
2024	GLOOM DIVISION	I DONT KNOW HOW BUT THEY FOUND ME
2024	Imaginal Disk (mixing)	Magdalena Bay
2024	Wild God (mixing)	Nick Cave and the Bad Seeds
2025	And the Adjacent Possible	OK Go
2025	Anyway	Anamanaguchi
2026	Hotel Usona	Protomartyr
2027	The Teardrop Throbs	The Flaming Lips
