= Grasshopper (musician) =

Grasshopper (Sean Mackowiak)
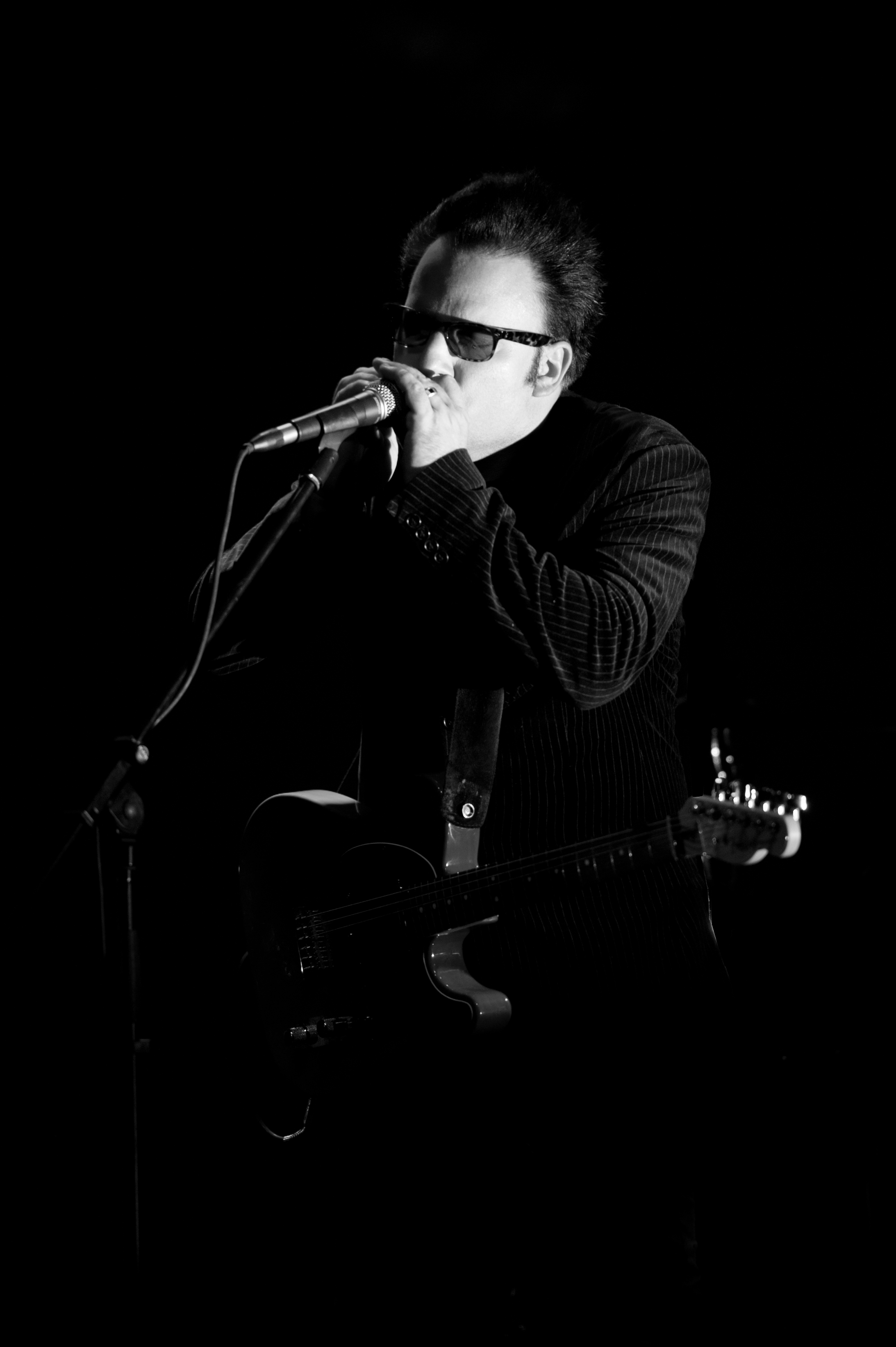
- Grasshopper performing with Mercury Rev in 2010

Background information
- Born: Sean Thomas Mackowiak; May 25, 1967 (age 58); Dunkirk, New York
- Genres: Alternative rock
- Occupation: Musician
- Instruments: Guitar, clarinet, keyboards, bass guitar, harmonica
- Years active: c. 1985 - present

Grasshopper (born Sean Thomas Mackowiak, May 25 1967) is an American musician with the band Mercury Rev. He has also appeared with Mercury Rev side-project Harmony Rockets, his own band Grasshopper and the Golden Crickets, and as a guest musician on numerous other recordings.

== Early years ==
Sean Thomas Mackowiak, known professionally as Grasshopper, was born on May 25, 1967, in Dunkirk, New York. He was introduced to music at a young age by his uncle, an Atlantic Records employee, who exposed him to influential jazz musicians like John Coltrane, Ornette Coleman, and Miles Davis. His proximity to Canada also allowed him to access a diverse range of radio stations, enriching his musical education further.

He pursued higher education in Media Studies at the State University of New York at Buffalo from 1984 to 1988, where he studied under avant-garde filmmakers Tony Conrad and Paul Sharits. Mackowiak later obtained a master’s degree from The New School (1990-1993). While at the University of Buffalo, he began playing bass guitar with Shady Crady, a precursor to Mercury Rev that also included future bandmate Jonathan Donahue.

Grasshopper’s nickname, derived from the Polish translation of his family’s surname, reflects his energetic childhood persona.

== Mercury Rev ==
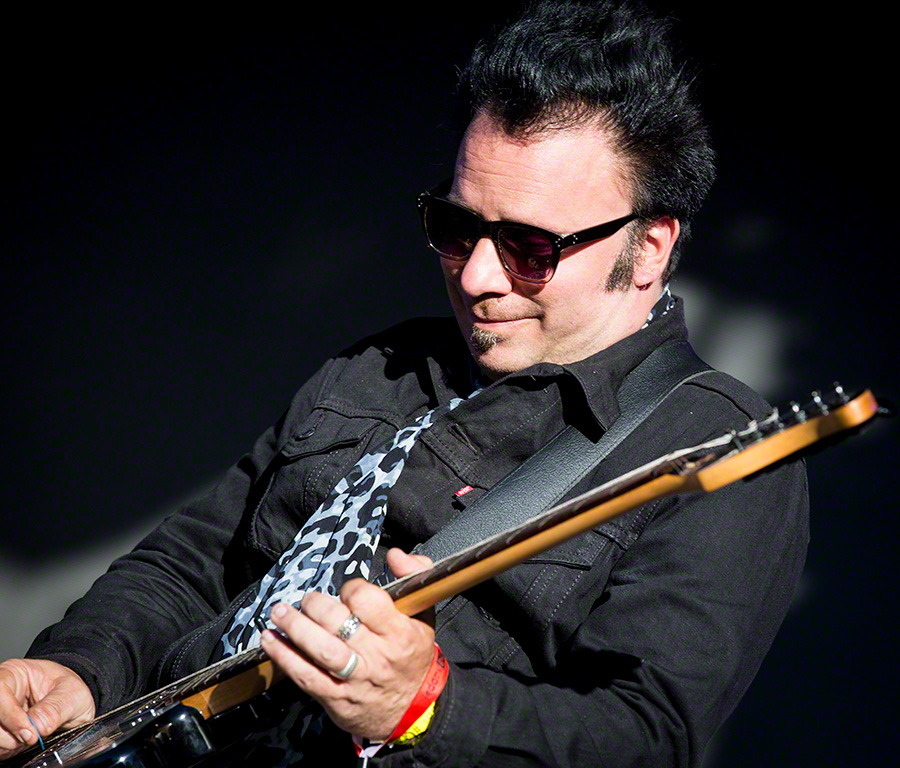
On stage at Quart Festival, Norway in 2016

Grasshopper co-founded Mercury Rev in 1989, initially playing electric guitar. The band’s early work, including the albums Yerself Is Steam (1991) and Boces (1993), featured his heavily effects-processed guitars which played a significant role in their complex soundscapes.

Following tumultuous periods marked by lineup changes, Grasshopper and the band underwent a musical transformation with the 1998 album Deserter’s Songs. This album marked a shift towards a more orchestral sound that incorporated his clarinet skills, contributing to the band’s resurgence and critical acclaim.

Grasshopper also participated in side projects such as Harmony Rockets and released a solo album under the name Grasshopper and the Golden Crickets. His solo album Orbit of Eternal Grace included contributions from several Mercury Rev members and featured songs that prefigured later Mercury Rev material.

Throughout his career with Mercury Rev, Grasshopper has played a range of instruments that have influenced the band’s evolving sound across albums like All Is Dream (2001) and The Secret Migration (2005), maintaining his role in shaping the band’s direction.

== Instruments and musicianship ==
Grasshopper is nominally the group's lead guitarist, credited with "guitar shapes" and "single-exhaust clarinet" in the See You on the Other Side liner notes, and with "guitar reels" and woodwind on Deserter's Songs. The Secret Migration's "Moving On" features prominent singing from him and Jeff Mercel, and "The Hudson Line", on Deserter's Songs and "Blood on the Moon" on Lego My Ego feature Grasshopper's only lead vocals with Mercury Rev. He also sings backing vocals live.

His musical setup often includes a range of guitars, predominantly Fender Telecasters customized with double humbucker pickups and tremolo arms. He has also utilized a Fender Tele-sonic with a Bigsby tremolo unit.

Grasshopper also invented the Tettix Wave Accumulator, a complex instrument composed of oscillators and filters that manipulate sound sources. This device played a significant role in the band’s recordings in the mid-1990s, offering unique sound manipulation capabilities at a time when similar effects were not easily achievable with software.

Beyond the guitar, his musical versatility extends to playing the clarinet, contributing to the band’s exploration of orchestral textures, particularly evident in their later albums. Grasshopper’s approach combines influences from jazz, punk, and avant-garde music, reflecting his broad musical background and interests.
