= Jonathan Donahue =

American musician (born 1966)

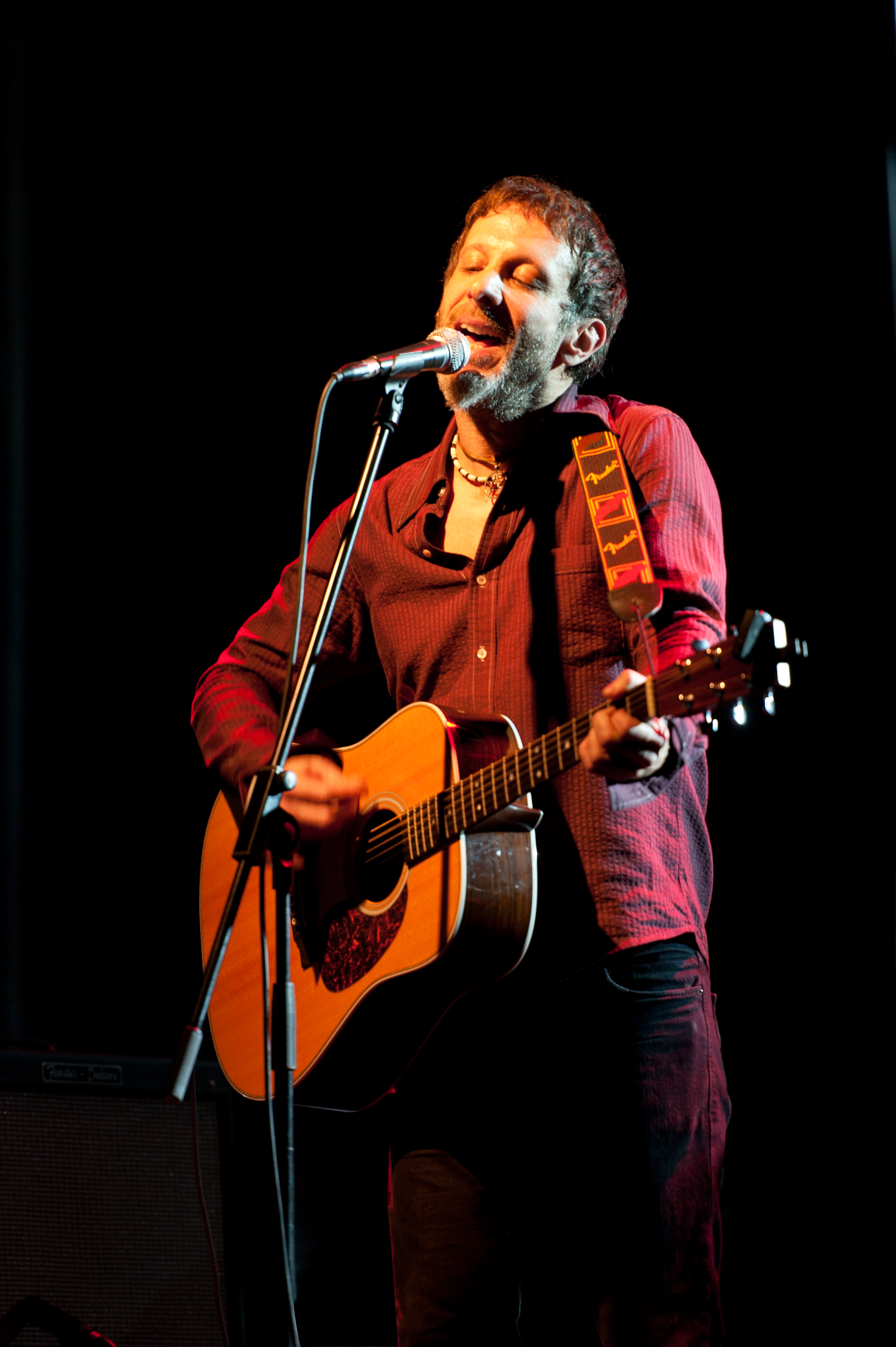
- Jonathan Donahue performing with Mercury Rev in 2010

Background information
- Born: Jonathan Daniel Donahue; May 6, 1966 (age 60); Kingston, New York, United States
- Genres: Alternative rock; indie rock; chamber pop; neo-psychedelia
- Occupations: Musician, Songwriter
- Instruments: Vocals; guitar
- Years active: Late 1980s–present

Jonathan Daniel Donahue (born May 6, 1966) is an American rock musician. He is best known as the frontman and a founding member of Mercury Rev, with whom he has released nine studio albums since 1991. He is also a former member of The Flaming Lips and recorded two albums with the group in the early 1990s.

== Career ==
Donahue helped form Mercury Rev, along with vocalist/guitarist David Baker, bassist Dave Fridmann, guitarist and clarinetist Grasshopper (born Sean Mackowiak), rooster-tail bass flutist Suzanne Thorpe, and drummer Jimy Chambers, in the late 1980s as a source to create soundtracks to the members' personal student films. The members were further encouraged to explore their talents by their mentor, minimalist composer and multimedia artist Tony Conrad.

Donahue also doubled as a concert promoter in Buffalo. After billing the Butthole Surfers and their opening act The Flaming Lips, Donahue joined The Flaming Lips around 1989/1990 as their guitar technician. He later joined the band as the full-time lead guitarist and played on the albums In a Priest Driven Ambulance and Hit to Death in the Future Head.

After being a member of The Flaming Lips for approximately two years, Donahue and The Flaming Lips frontman Wayne Coyne began to disagree over creative issues. Donahue left the band shortly after recording Hit to Death in the Future Head and was replaced by Oklahoma City guitarist Ronald Jones.

After leaving The Flaming Lips, Donahue returned to Buffalo and focused his time on reforming Mercury Rev. Donahue was credited as having played the clarinet line for The Chemical Brothers' 1997 cult hit "The Private Psychedelic Reel", which has been the on and off closing song to their shows ever since. The clarinet part was actually played by former Mercury Rev reed player, Mark Marinoff.

== Personal life ==
Donahue was born in Kingston, New York.
