= Number Girl =

Japanese rock band

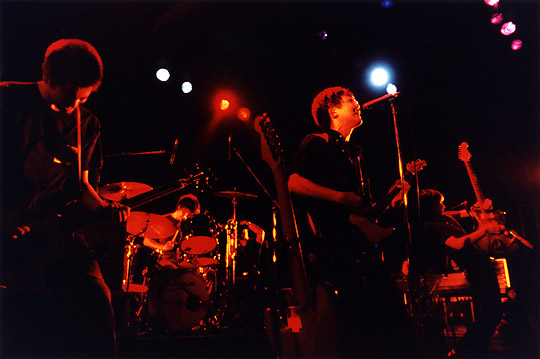
- Number Girl performing in 1998. From left to right: Nakao, Inazawa, Mukai, Tabuchi

Background information
- Origin: Fukuoka, Japan
- Genres: Alternative rock, post-hardcore, indie rock, noise rock, experimental rock
- Years active: 1995–2002, 2019–2022
- Label: Toshiba EMI
- Spinoffs: Zazen Boys
- Past members: Shutoku Mukai; Hisako Tabuchi; Kentaro Nakao; Ahito Inazawa
- Website: numbergirl.com

Number Girl (Japanese: ナンバーガール, Hepburn: Nanbā Gāru) was a Japanese rock band from Fukuoka Prefecture, formed in August 1995 by vocalist and guitarist Shutoku Mukai. They first disbanded in 2002 following bassist Kentaro Nakao's departure from the band.

Number Girl played fast, guitar-driven rock similar to the Pixies, Sonic Youth, and Hüsker Dü. Over the course of seven years their sound evolved greatly, serving as a basis for Mukai's post-Number Girl project, Zazen Boys.

In February 2019, it was announced that the band would be reuniting to perform at Rising Sun Rock Festival 2019 in Ezo. Although the first day of the festival was cancelled and Number Girl did not perform, they had already announced a four-date Japanese tour by this time, beginning at Hibiya Open-Air Concert Hall on August 18. The day after the Hibiya concert, they announced a further twelve Japanese tour dates, set to span over December 2019 to February 2020.

Number Girl disbanded on December 11, 2022, after playing a final concert at Pia Arena MM in Yokohama, "Mujou no Hi" (無常の日).

== History ==
=== 1995–1998: Formation ===
Number Girl was formed in August 1995, when Shutoku Mukai decided to form a band to play at a local event. A solo artist at the time, Mukai was briefly involved in one band called "Number Five". Learning that his new members were previously in a band called "Cowgirl", he combined the names, and christened his new band "Number Girl".

The original incarnation of Number Girl was unsuccessful, and the collaborating musicians quickly left the group. Mukai invited bassist Kentarō Nakao, who in turn invited guitarist Hisako Tabuchi, whom Nakao knew from her former job operating lighting at the Vivre Hall venue. Mukai convinced a fellow Fukuoka scene musician Ahito Inazawa to play drums, which would finalize Number Girl's lineup. The band self-released two demos, "Atari Shock" and "Omoide in My Head", and was also featured on several compilations. Number Girl released their first full-length studio album, School Girl Bye Bye in November 1997 on independent label Automatic Kiss, and released their first single, "Drunken Hearted", several months later.

=== 1998–2001: Major label debut ===
In 1998, the band began playing shows in the Shimokitazawa area of Tokyo. Gaining a higher profile in Japan's indie rock scene, the band quickly attracted major label attention, and signed with Toshiba EMI, followed by an appearance at the U.S. music event SXSW as part of Japan Nite in March 1999.

In May 1999, their major debut single, "Tōmei Shōjo" (透明少女) was released with their major debut, School Girl Distortional Addict, released the following July. Number Girl quickly gained popularity throughout Japan, playing shows with other high-profile indie acts such as Bloodthirsty Butchers and Eastern Youth. In fall of 1999, Number Girl released the single "Destruction Baby", produced by Flaming Lips producer Dave Fridmann, as well as a live album, Shibuya Rockstransformed Jōtai.

In 2000 the band again entered the studio with producer Dave Fridmann and released their third full-length studio album, Sappukei. Fridmann's production helped the band to reach their full potential, and Sappukei served to combine Number Girl's aggressive rock with traditional Japanese sounds. During this time, they embarked on a brief US tour with Polysics, playing in small clubs through several cities.

After a year of touring, the band again enlisted Dave Fridmann to produce what would become their final studio album, Num-Heavymetallic. Num-Heavymetallic took elements of their previous sound and combined it with Mukai's newly found experimentation. Unusual rhythms, effects-laden guitar lines, and a vocal style which alternated between punk-inspired grit and spoken word, would eventually be incorporated into Mukai's subsequent band, Zazen Boys.

=== 2002: Break-up ===
The band then set out on their largest tour, playing over thirty dates, to support Num-Heavymetallic. However, on September 20, 2002, the band shocked fans by announcing their dissolution. The reason behind the band's demise is not entirely clear, although it is widely known that bassist Kentarō decided to leave the band. The other members decided that the band was a specific group, and opted to disband rather than replace Nakao. Number Girl played their final show on November 30, 2002, in Sapporo. The recording of the performance would later be released as Sapporo Omoide in My Head Jōtai (サッポロOmoide in My Head状態).

=== 2002–2019: Post-breakup activities ===
Following the demise of Number Girl, the members each went on to other projects. Nakao joined several bands like Spiral Chord, Sloth Love Chunks, Crypt City, younGSounds and later joined his long time friend Aiha Higurashi for the revival of Seagull Screaming Kiss Her Kiss Her. Nakao also played as support member for the bands like Mass of the Fermenting Dregs, dry as dust, The Salovers, hammer, fast Tokyo, and produced the band called The Girl. Guitarist Hisako Tabuchi formed her own band Toddle, became a member of Bloodthirsty Butchers and later joined the supergroup Lama consisting of former Supercar members Koji Nakamura and Miki Furukawa. Mukai continued performing as both a solo artist with his "Mukai Shutoku Acoustic & Electric" shows and formed a new band, Zazen Boys alongside drummer Ahito Inazawa. In 2005, Inazawa left Zazen Boys to form post-punk revival band Vola and the Oriental Machine and later joined Beyonds. In 2010, Mukai formed another band called Kimonos.

Toshiba EMI released several posthumous Number Girl recordings under the title Omoide in My Head, consisting of a best-and-b-sides collection, two comprehensive live volumes, a three DVD set consisting of the band's two earlier live albums, and a rare tracks collection.

=== 2019–2022: Reunion ===
The band made a surprise announcement in February 2019 that they would be reuniting with the original members to re-form the band. Their first live performance was at Rising Sun Rock Festival in August 2019, with future activities yet to be revealed.

Mukai's comment on the band's official website explains how the reunion came about. "I was drunk one day in the beginning of summer 2018," he shares. "And I thought, I want to 'do it' with them again as Number Girl at Rising. I also thought, 'I want to make money.' I was drunk."

Number Girl website posted a gig schedule which is titled "Number Girl Tour 2019–2020".

On 4 May 2021, Number Girl livestreamed a performance at Hibiya Yagai Ongakudo, during which they played 「排水管」 ("Drainpipe"), their first new song in almost 20 years.

On August 13, 2022, Shutoku Mukai announced at Rising Sun Rock Festival 2022 that Number Girl will disband following a final performance at Yokohama PIA Arena MM on December 11.

== Musical style ==
Number Girl's style prior to signing with Toshiba EMI was a brand of indie rock influenced by 70s punk bands such as The Ramones, as well as more contemporary band The Pixies. Although many of Mukai's influences, as diverse as Led Zeppelin, Prince, Miles Davis, and Public Enemy, would not emerge until after Number Girl's demise, his bandmates' combined musical tastes would serve to define much of Number Girl's sound, despite Mukai's clear role as the creative force behind the band. Nirvana is credited as inspiring Nakao Kentarou to begin playing music, but his aggressive, distorted basslines resemble 1980s hardcore punk, such as Hüsker Dü. Tabuchi's mostly melodic lead playing was contrasted by frenetic noise rock sections, inspired by Sonic Youth. Drummer Inazawa was inspired by new wave bands such as The Police and Talking Heads, although these influences would seldom emerge prior the band's final album.

With their 1999 release, School Girl Distortional Addict, Number Girl moved towards a much heavier sound somewhat reminiscent of post-hardcore. Their 2000 album Sappukei built on its predecessor but incorporated a more ethereal quality characteristic of producer Dave Fridmann. Traditional Japanese music influence was also found in songs such as "Urban Guitar Sayonara". Number Girl's final album, Num-Heavymetallic, continued the fusion of post-hardcore and traditional Japanese music, showing Mukai's evolving musical sensibilities fully expressed in Zazen Boys.

Shutoku's vocal style is one of the band's most distinctive traits, a combination of shaky singing, aggressive growls and screams, spoken word, and occasional rapping. Although most lyrics are in Japanese, his songwriting was one of the band's most critically lauded aspects. Shutoku's early lyrics dealt with conventional themes such as high school and girls, reflecting adolescent aggression rather typical of nineties hard rock; however, with later albums, Mukai would begin exploring deeper lyrical themes, such as disillusionment with Japanese culture and harsh social criticism, that distinguished Number Girl from their peers.

== Legacy ==
Many bands and musicians have cited Number Girl as an inspiration, including Base Ball Bear, Asian Kung-Fu Generation, tricot, Kinoko Teikoku, Ling Tosite Sigure, Wowaka, kafka, Touming Magazine, Minor School Art School, and Weatherday. They are considered one of the biggest names in the Japanese indie and alternative rock scenes of the late 1990s to early 2000s, along with Supercar and Quruli.

== Members ==
- Shutoku Mukai (向井秀徳, Mukai Shūtoku) (born October 26, 1973) – guitar, vocals
- Hisako Tabuchi (田渕ひさ子, Tabuchi Hisako) (born December 9, 1975) – guitar
- Kentarō Nakao (中尾憲太郎, Nakao Kentarō) (born June 17, 1974) – bass
- Ahito Inazawa (アヒト・イナザワ, Ahito Inazawa) (born June 6, 1973) – drums

== Discography ==
=== Albums ===
- School Girl Bye Bye (November 6, 1997)
- School Girl Distortional Addict (July 23, 1999)
- Sappukei (July 19, 2000)
- Num-Heavymetallic (April 26, 2002)

=== Compilation albums ===
- Omoide in My Head 1: Best & B-Sides (Omoide in My Head 1 〜Best & B-Sides〜) (March 2, 2005)
- Omoide in My Head 2: Kiroku Series 1 (Omoide in My Head 2 記録シリーズ1) (June 22, 2005)
- Omoide in My Head 2: Kiroku Series 2 (Omoide in My Head 2 記録シリーズ2) (June 22, 2005)
- Omoide in My Head 4: Chin NG & Rare Tracks (珍NG & Rare Tracks) (December 14, 2005)

=== Live albums ===
- Shibuya Rockstransformed Jōtai (December 16, 1999)
- Sapporo Omoide in My Head Jōtai (サッポロOmoide in My Head状態) (January 29, 2003)
- Live Album "Kandenno Kioku" 2002.5.19 Tour "Num-Heavymetallic" Hibiya Yagai Ongakudō (LIVE ALBUM『感電の記憶』2002.5.19 TOUR『NUM-HEAVYMETALLIC』日比谷野外大音楽堂) (July 24, 2019)
- Live Album "Number Girl Mujō No Hi" (LIVE ALBUM「NUMBER GIRL 無常の日」) (May 31, 2023)

=== Singles ===
- "Drunken Hearted" (August 20, 1998)
- "Tōmei Shōjo" (透明少女) (May 26, 1999)
- "Destruction Baby" (September 26, 1999)
- "Urban Guitar Sayonara" (May 31, 2000)
- "Teppū Surudoku Natte" (鉄風 鋭くなって) (November 29, 2000)
- "Num-Ami-Dabutz" (March 30, 2002)
- "I Don't Know" (April 8, 2002)

=== DVD ===
- Sawayaka na Ensō (騒やかな演奏) (June 20, 2001)
- Number Girl Eizōshū (Number Girl映像集) (April 26, 2003)
- Omoide in My Head 3: Kiroku Eizō (Omoide in My Head 3 記録映像) (September 28, 2005)
