= Jump Up (Supercar album) =

Studio album by Supercar
- Released: March 10, 1999
- Genres: Indie rock, dream pop, alternative rock, shoegazing
- Length: 51:34
- Label: Epic Records Japan
- Producer: Supercar

Supercar chronology
Three Out Change (1998)	Jump Up (1999)	Futurama (2000)

Singles from Jump Up
- 1. "Sunday People" Released: September 30, 1998; 2. "My Girl" Released: February 3, 1999; 3. "Love Forever" Released: May 12, 1999

Professional ratings
Review scores
Source	Rating
AllMusic	2.5/5 stars

Jump Up is the second studio album by Supercar. It was released on March 10, 1999. It peaked at number 12 on the Oricon Albums Chart.

== Track listing ==
All lyrics are written by Junji Ishiwatari; all music is composed by Koji Nakamura.

No.	Title	Length
1.	"Walk Slowly"	5:01
2.	"Sunday People"	5:21
3.	"Jump"	3:56
4.	"My Girl"	3:56
5.	"Wonderful World"	3:49
6.	"Love Forever"	4:11
7.	"Tonight"	3:30
8.	"Skyphone Speaker"	4:57
9.	"Low-Down (Live Scene)"	4:33
10.	"Talk Talk"	6:40
11.	"Daydreamer"	5:40

== Personnel ==
Credits adapted from the liner notes.

- Koji Nakamura – vocals, guitar
- Junji Ishiwatari – guitar
- Miki Furukawa – vocals, bass guitar
- Kodai Tazawa – drums

== Charts ==
Chart	Peak position
Japanese Albums (Oricon)	12
