= Schoolgirl Byebye =

Chinese indie rock band

Schoolgirl Byebye, stylized as Schoolgirl byebye, is a Chinese indie rock band. A five-member act led by vocalist Yang Yue and drummer Geng Shengzai, the band's styles encompass dream pop, shoegaze, and other genres. The China Project called them one of the most interesting Chinese bands of the 2010s.

== Name ==
Schoolgirl Byebye is derived from School Girl Bye Bye, an album by the Japanese rock band Number Girl.

== History ==
Schoolgirl Byebye was formed in Nanjing, in the summer of 2015, as Yang and Geng, best friends at the time, fell in love. One year later, the band won Best Newcomer at Douban's music awards.

In 2024, the band embarked on the Schoolgirl Byebye Asia Tour. They also toured in the United States, as well as appeared at the Asian Pop Festival hosted in Incheon, South Korea.
