= Junji Ishiwatari =

Japanese musician

Junji Ishiwatari いしわたり淳治
- Born: August 21, 1977 (age 49); Towada, Aomori, Japan
- Genres: J-rock; J-pop
- Occupations: Musician; record producer; guitarist
- Instrument: Guitar
- Years active: 1995–present
- Labels: Epic Records (1997–2000); Ki/oon Records (2000–2005)
- Formerly of: Supercar
- Website: kihon.eplus2.jp

Junji Ishiwatari (いしわたり 淳治, Ishiwatari Junji; born August 21, 1977, in Towada, Aomori) is a Japanese musician, songwriter and record producer. He is also famous for being a guitarist of the Japanese band Supercar.

== Biography ==
Ishiwatari found an ad looking for band members that had been posted by Miki Furukawa at a musical instrument store in Hachinohe. He made contact with her in 1995, invited his childhood friend Kōji Nakamura, and while still in high school they formed a band. Kōdai Tazawa later joined the band, which was named Supercar.

Supercar made its debut with a major label in 1997 and in 1998 it released the influential debut album, Three Out Change. Music critic Ian Martin has called it "one of the all-time great Japanese rock albums." Ishiwatari played guitar and wrote all the lyrics.

During the late 1990s and early 2000s, Supercar continued to perform and produced albums that increasingly combined alternative rock with electronic music. Supercar has been characterized as having "almost foundational importance to 21st century Japanese indie rock". The band broke up in 2005, and Ishiwatari began working as a lyricist and record producer.

In 2010, Ishiwatari released the single "Kamisama no Iutōri" with Yoshinori Sunahara who was a former member of Denki Groove. They featured Etsuko Yakushimaru (Sōtaisei Riron etc.) as a vocalist. This song was featured as the closing theme for the anime, The Tatami Galaxy.

== Discography ==
Supercar

2004

- Nona Reeves "Ai no Taiyō" – lyrics
- Halcali "Oboroge Copy View" – lyrics

2005

- Nona Reeves "Tōmei Girl" – lyrics
- B-Dash "New Horizon" – lyrics
- Asako Toki "Watashi no Okiniiri" – lyrics
- Chatmonchy "chatmonchy has come" – produce
- Kousuke Atari "Subete ni Imi wo Kurerumono", "Suna no Shiro" – lyrics

2006

- Nona Reeves "Christmas Time" – lyrics
- Kousuke Atari "Michi" – lyrics
- Chatmonchy "Koi no Kemuri" – produce
- B-Dash "Oh my love" – lyrics
- Suemitsu & the Suemith "Irony (" Bittersweet Irony "Japanese Version)", "Arabesque (" Melody Played by Pianist "Japanese Version)", "Sherbet Snow and the Airplane" – Japanese lyrics
- Chatmonchy "Renai Spirits" – produce
- Kousuke Atari "Mahiru no Hanabi" – lyrics
- Chatmonchy "Miminari" – produce
- Suemitsu & the Suemith "Astaire" – Japanese lyrics
- Disco Twins "Adabana" – lyrics
- FLOW "Kandata" – lyrics
- Merengue "Kurai Tokoro de Machiawase ~ Rōdoku: Rena Tanaka" – lyrics
- Chatmonchy "Shangri-La" – produce

2007

- Chatmonchy "Joshitachi ni Asu wa nai" – produce
- 9mm Parabellum Bullet "The WORLD", "Heat-Island" – produce
- FLEET "sociologie" – lyrics
- Chatmonchy "Tobiuo no Butterfly / Sekai ga Owaru Yoru ni" – produce
- Kousuke Atari "Hitosashiyubi no Melody", "Koi no Shiori" – lyrics
- Chatmonchy "Daidai" – produce
- Kana Uemura "Anata no Sono Egao wa Ii Hint ni naru" – lyrics
- 9mm Parabellum Bullet "Discommunication ep" – produce
- (Various Artists) "Rock for Baby" – supervise
- Chatmonchy "life force" – produce

2008

- Itsco "SEKI-LALALA" – lyrics
- Superfly "Ai wo Komete Hanataba wo" – lyrics
- Chatmonchy "Hirahira Hiraku Himitsu no Tobira" – produce
- FUTABA enjoy with Tomita Labo "Get up! Do the right! featuring Chikuzen Sato & bird" – lyrics
- Suemitsu & The Suemith "The Island March", "ID" – lyrics
- 9mm Parabellum Bullet "Supernova / Wanderland" – produce
- Chatmonchy "Kaze Fukeba Koi" – produce
- 9mm Parabellum Bullet "Vampire" – produce

2009

- Miho Fukuhara "La La La FIGHTERS" – lyrics

2010

- Junji Ishiwatari & Yoshinori Sunahara + Etsuko Yakushimaru "Kamisama no Iutōri" – lyrics
- FLiP "Dear Girls" – lyrics, produce
- FLiP "mulu mole" – lyrics, arrangement, produce
- alan "Na mo Naki Tane" – lyrics
- Chiaki Kuriyama "Kanōsei Girl" – lyrics

2011

- FLiP "Katoniago" – lyrics, arrangement, produce
- FLiP "Michi Evolution" – lyrics, arrangement, produce
- Kousuke Atari "Kimi no Kakera feat Emiri Miyamoto" – lyrics
- Seira "Shinpai bakka Mou Shinakuteiiyo" – lyrics, produce
- Rock'A'Trench "Bohemia" – lyrics, arrangement, produce
- Negoto "Karon" – lyrics, arrangement, produce
- Rock'A'Trench "Hikarisasu Hō e" – lyrics, arrangement, produce
- F.T. Island "Satisfaction", "Itsuka" – lyrics
- Rock'A'Trench "Hibi no Nukumori dakede" – lyrics, arrangement, produce
- Hi Lockation Markets "Tabibito" – lyrics
- FTIsland "Satisfaction" – lyrics
- NICO Touches the Walls "Matryoshka" – lyrics, arrangement, produce
- Chiaki Kuriyama "Kuchi ni Shita LOVE", "Knōsei Girl", "Ladies & Gentlemen" – lyrics
- S.R.S "Real Lie" – lyrics, arrangement, produce
- Halcali "Superstitions" – lyrics

2012

- F.T. Island "Neverland" – lyrics
- Girls' Generation "Paparazzi" – songwriting
- Girls' Generation "All My Love Is for You" – songwriting
- Girls' Generation "Flower Power" – lyrics

2013

- Shinee "Fire" – lyrics
- Shinee "Moon River Waltz" – lyrics

2016

- Glim Spanky "Wild Side wo Ike" – co-wrote the lyrics
- Glim Spanky "Ikari o Kure yo" – co-wrote the lyrics

2017

- EXO-CBX "Miss You" – lyrics

2018

- Taeyeon "I'm The Greatest" – lyrics

2022

- Glim Spanky "Fukou Are" – co-wrote the lyrics
