= Futurama (disambiguation) =

Futurama is an American animated science fiction sitcom created by Matt Groening.

Futurama may also refer to:

- Futurama (New York World's Fair), an exhibit/ride at the 1939 and 1964 New York World's Fair
- Futurama (Be-Bop Deluxe album), 1975
- Futurama (Supercar album), a 2000 album from the Japanese rock group Supercar
- Futurama (video game), a 2003 3D platform game based on the science fiction cartoon series
- A United Kingdom guitar brand, known as "Kent" in the United States
