= Mike Holland =

Mike Holland may refer to:

- Mike Holland (golfer) (born 1956), American golfer
- Mike Holland (ski jumper) (born 1961), American former world record holder for longest jump
- Mike Holland (politician), Canadian politician
- Michael P. Holland, U.S. Navy rear admiral
- Michael Holland (musician), American songwriter, musician, and producer
- Michael Holland (politician), Australian politician

== See also ==
- Mike Hollands (born 1946), creative director and founder of Melbourne-based animation house Act3animation
- Mick Holland (1918–2005), New Zealand speedway rider
