= Love Forever (disambiguation) =

"Love Forever" is a 2009 song by Miliyah Kato.

Love Forever may also refer to:

== Music ==
- Love Forever (ja), a 2007 album by Jyongri
- "Love Forever", composition by Michael Nyman from the soundtrack to the film 6 Days 6 Nights
- "Love Forever" (ja), a 1995 single by Deen from I Wish
- "Love Forever" (ja), a 1999 single by Supercar from Jump Up

== Other uses ==
- Love Forever: Yayoi Kusama, 1958–1969, an exhibition by artist Yayoi Kusama
- Ai dao Yongyuan (Chinese: 爱到永远 Love Forever), a Chinese novel by Liu Xinglong
- Love Forever (film), a 1983 Japanese music film starring Toshihiko Tahara
