= Dead Wonderland =

Studio album by iLL
- Released: March 5, 2008
- Genres: Alternative rock, shoegazing, indie rock
- Labels: Phantom Sound & Vision

ILL chronology
| Sound by iLL (2006) | Dead Wonderland (2008) |

Dead Wonderland is the second album released by Koji Nakamura under the moniker of iLL. It was released by the record company Phantom Sound & Vision in 2008.

== Track listing ==
| No. | Title | Length |
|---|---|---|
| 1. | "Call My Name" |
| 2. | "Timeless" |
| 3. | "Half Way" |
| 4. | "Snake Head" |
| 5. | "Girl" |
| 6. | "Six Sense" |
| 7. | "Till She Comes" |
| 8. | "Rosemary" |
| 9. | "Derek" |
| 10. | "Stranger" |
| 11. | "Room" |
| 12. | "You & Me" |
