= Sappukei =

Studio album by Number Girl
- Released: July 17, 2000
- Studios: Tarbox Road Studios, Cassadaga, NY.
- Genres: Post-hardcore; indie rock
- Length: 39:03
- Label: Toshiba EMI
- Producer: Dave Fridmann

Number Girl chronology
Shibuya Rockstransformed Jōtai (1999)	Sappukei (2000)	Num-Heavymetallic (2002)

Professional ratings
Review scores
Source	Rating
Pitchfork	7.7/10

Sappukei ("Tastelessness") is the third studio album by Japanese rock band Number Girl, released on July 17, 2000. It peaked at number 82 on the Oricon Albums Chart. It was ranked 37th on Snoozer's "100 Greatest Japanese Albums of All Time." David Fridmann of Mercury Rev produced the album.

== Track listing ==
No.	Title	Length
1.	"Brutal Number Girl"	2:03
2.	"Zegen vs Undercover"	2:43
3.	"Sasu-You"	2:40
4.	"Urban Guitar Sayonara"	4:10
5.	"Abstract Truth"	3:28
6.	"Tattoo Ari" (Tattooあり)	3:25
7.	"Sappukei"	3:47
8.	"U-Rei"	4:18
9.	"Yaruse Nakio no Beat" (Yaruse NakioのBeat)	5:06
10.	"Trampoline Girl"	4:28
11.	"Brutal Man"	2:53

== Charts ==
Chart	Peak position
Japanese Albums (Oricon)	82
