= Supercar (band) =

Japanese rock band

- Origin: Aomori, Japan
- Genres: Indie rock; alternative rock; shoegaze; dream pop; synthpop
- Years active: 1995–2005
- Labels: Epic (1997–2000); Ki/oon (2000–2005)
- Past members: Kōji Nakamura; Miki Furukawa; Junji Ishiwatari; Kōdai Tazawa
- Website: Sony Music Online Japan: Supercar

Supercar (スーパーカー, Sūpākā) was a Japanese rock band active from 1995 to 2005, who made their commercial debut in 1997. Consisting of composer and vocalist Kōji Nakamura (中村弘二 Nakamura Kōji), lyricist and guitarist Junji Ishiwatari (いしわたり淳治 Ishiwatari Junji), bassist Miki Furukawa (フルカワミキ Furukawa Miki), and drummer Kōdai Tazawa (田沢公大 Tazawa Kōdai), Supercar is best known for combining alternative rock with electronic music and has been characterized as having an "almost foundational importance to 21st century Japanese indie rock". Internationally, Supercar is also known for providing much of the soundtrack for the Japanese film Ping Pong, as well as being featured in the anime series Eureka Seven.

== History ==
Hailing from Aomori Prefecture, Supercar was formed in 1995 when bassist Miki Furukawa placed an advertisement in a local magazine seeking fellow musicians. Junji Ishiwatari responded and convinced childhood friend Kōji Nakamura to join as well. Junji and Kōji soon recruited drummer Kōdai Tazawa, an acquaintance from middle school. While still in high school, they began writing songs starting with the singles DRIVE and (Am I) confusing you?

After writing songs and recording demo tapes, the group received a record contract in 1995. By 1997, they had released two singles (cream soda and Lucky) and were working on their first album. In 1998 they released their influential debut album, Three Out Change. Music critic Ian Martin has described it as an "epic indie rock/shoegaze album" and "one of the all-time great Japanese rock albums." Later that year, they went on their first national tour.

Supercar's second album, Jump Up, was released in 1999 shortly after the group members had moved to Tokyo from Aomori. This album was followed by OOKeah!! and OOYeah!!, both also released in 1999. With the 2000 album Futurama, electronic experimentation took a larger role that would characterize the band's sound for the remainder of their active years. During the summer of 2001, the group performed at both the Fuji Rock Festival and Rock in Japan Festival. The 2002 release Highvision continued the electronic development, and the single Strobolights did not even contain a guitar.

Supercar released its last non-compilation album, Answer in 2004. Perhaps their most experimental album, Answer contained balance of both rock and electronica. In July of that year, they played at the Fuji Rock Festival for the third and final time.

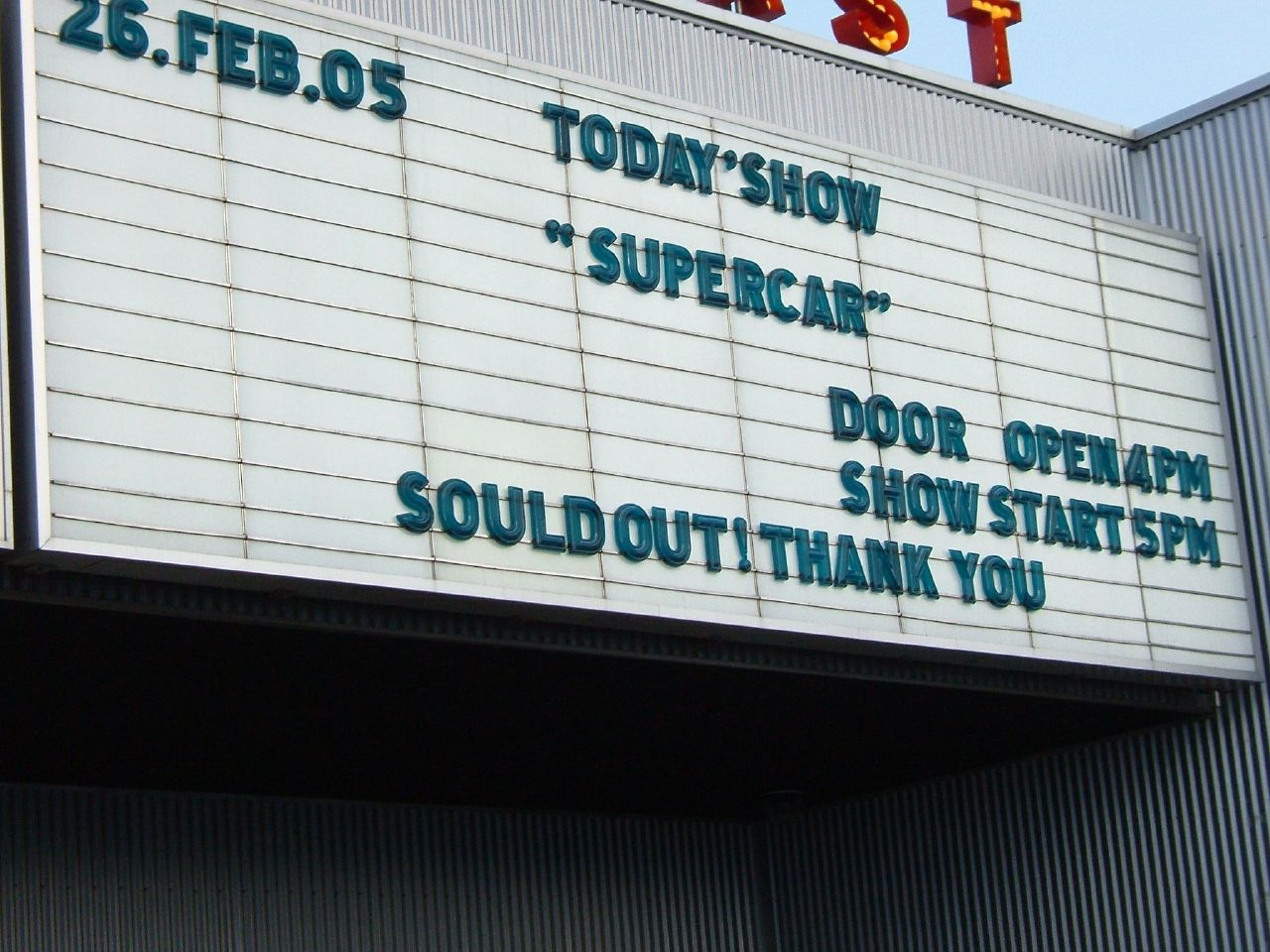
The marquee for Supercar's final concert at Shin-Kiba Studio Coast, Tokyo, Japan

In February 2005, Supercar broke up following a final concert, released under DVD as Last Live. Later that year, their song "Storywriter" featured in the anime Eureka Seven. Following the breakup, Furukawa and Nakamura have pursued successful solo careers.

Despite the break-up, Supercar released two remix albums named RE:SUPERCAR 1 and RE:SUPERCAR 2 in 2011. The albums are redesigned versions of some of their tracks throughout their career together with never before heard songs. The limited edition of these albums sported a different CD jacket and bonus CD containing some of their untitled tracks and demos.

In 2011, Miki Furukawa and Koji Nakamura formed the band LAMA. They jump-started their formation with their single Spell which was used as an opening theme for the anime "No.6". They also performed the ending theme Fantasy for the anime Un-Go.

== Members ==
- Kōji Nakamura (中村 弘二, Nakamura Kōji; born September 28, 1977, in Towada, Aomori) – lead vocals, rhythm guitar & synthesizer; Composer
  After a solo career under the name of NYANTORA or iLL, he formed LAMA with Furukawa currently.
- Junji Ishiwatari (石渡 淳治, Ishiwatari Junji; born August 21, 1977 in Towada, Aomori) – lead guitar, synthesizer; Lyricist
  After the band broke up, he has written lyrics for various musicians and bands or has produced them.
- Miki Furukawa (古川 美季, Furukawa Miki; born February 19, 1979, in Hachinohe, Aomori) – bass guitar, synthesizer, vocals
  After a solo career under the name of Miki Furukawa (フルカワ ミキ, Furukawa Miki), she formed LAMA with Nakamura currently.
- Kōdai Tazawa (田沢 公大, Tazawa Kōdai; born February 27, 1978 in Towada, Aomori) – drums
  After the band broke up, he formed aM™[aem], who have had multiple songs feature in Gran Turismo 5 and 6.

== Discography ==
=== Albums ===
==== Studio albums ====
List of albums, with selected chart positions and certifications
Title	Album details	Peak chart positions
Title	Album details	JPN
Three Out Change	Released: April 1, 1998; Label: Dohb; Formats: CD, LP, digital download	20
Jump Up	Released: March 10, 1999; Label: Dohb; Formats: CD, digital download	12
Futurama	Released: November 22, 2000; Label: Ki/oon; Formats: CD, digital download	21
Highvision	Released: April 24, 2002; Label: Ki/oon; Formats: CD, digital download	11
Answer	Released: February 25, 2004; Label: Ki/oon; Formats: CD, LP, digital download	18

==== Compilation albums ====
List of albums, with selected chart positions and certifications
Title	Album details	Peak chart positions
Title	Album details	JPN
OOKeah!!	Released: August 21, 1999; Label: Dohb; Formats: CD, LP, digital download	—
OOYeah!!	Released: August 21, 1999; Label: Dohb; Formats: CD, LP, digital download	—
16/50 1997〜1999	Released: February 14, 2003; Label: Ki/oon; Formats: CD, digital download	—
A	Released: March 24, 2005; Label: Ki/oon; Formats: CD, digital download	—
B	Released: March 24, 2005; Label: Ki/oon; Formats: CD, digital download	—
Re: Supercar 1	Released: April 20, 2011; Label: Ki/oon; Formats: CD, digital download	34
Re: Supercar 2	Released: June 15, 2011; Label: Ki/oon; Formats: CD, digital download	34
PERMAFROST	Released: April 25, 2018; Label: Ki/oon; Formats: CD, DVD, digital download	—

==== Singles ====
- "Cream Soda" (September 21, 1997)
- "Planet" (December 1, 1997)
- "Lucky" (March 1, 1998)
- "Drive" (May 21, 1998)
- "Sunday People" (September 21, 1998)
- "My Girl" (February 3, 1999)
- "Love Forever" (May 21, 1999)
- "Fairway" (February 2, 2000)
- "White Surf Style 5" (October 12, 2000)
- "Strobolights" (May 23, 2001)
- "Yumegiwa Last Boy" (November 21, 2001)
- "Aoharu Youth" (February 6, 2002)
- "Recreation" (February 14, 2003)
- "BGM" (November 19, 2003)
- "Last Scene" (January 28, 2004)
- "Wonder Word EP" (April 28, 2004)

==== DVDs ====
- High Booster + U.N. VJ Works (November 19, 2002)
- P.V.D. (November 20, 2002)
- P.V.D. 2 (November 20, 2002)
- Last Live Kanzen-ban (LAST LIVE 完全版 Last Live: Complete Edition) (June 29, 2005)
- P.V.D. Complete 10th Anniversary Edition (April 4, 2007)
