= Lama (Japanese band) =

Japanese supergroup

- Genres: Electronic; J-Pop; pop rock
- Years active: 2011–present
- Labels: Ki/oon Records
- Members: Miki Furukawa; Kōji Nakamura; Hisako Tabuchi; Kensuke Ushio
- Website: lama.jp

Lama is a Japanese supergroup consisting of former Supercar members Kōji Nakamura and Miki Furukawa, along with Hisako Tabuchi and Kensuke Ushio.

== Biography ==
The band was formed in 2011 and is made up of Koji Nakamura (Supercar, iLL, Nyantora), Miki Furukawa (Supercar), Hisako Tabuchi (Number Girl, Bloodthirsty Butchers, Toddle), and Kensuke Ushio (agraph). They made their live debut at a show with Kimonos in April 2011. Their debut single "Spell" and released in August 2011, was used as the opening for the Fuji Television noitaminA anime television series, No. 6. They were also used for the closing theme of Fuji Television's noitaminA anime television series Un-Go with their third single "Cupid/Fantasy", released in October 2011. , The "Parallel Sign" was used as the insert song for the anime series, Eureka Seven: AO. The band is signed with the Sony label Ki/oon Records, which Nakamura, Furukawa, and Ushio are also affiliated with as solo artists.

== Members ==
- Miki Furukawa (フルカワ ミキ, Furukawa Miki) – vocals, bass
- Kōji Nakamura (中村 弘二, Nakamura Kōji) – vocals, guitar
- Hisako Tabuchi (田渕 ひさ子, Tabuchi Hisako) – guitar, chorus
- Kensuke Ushio (牛尾 憲輔, Ushio Kensuke) – programming

== Discography ==
=== Studio albums ===
- New! (2011)
- Modanica (2012)

=== Singles ===
2011

- Spell
- Cupid
- Fantasy

2012

- Parallel Sign
- Seven Swell
