= Three Out Change =

Studio album by Supercar
- Released: April 1, 1998
- Genres: Alternative rock, shoegaze, indie rock, noise pop
- Length: 78:11
- Label: Epic Records Japan
- Producer: Supercar

Supercar chronology
Three Out Change (1998)	Jump Up (1999)

Singles from Three Out Change
- 1. "Cream Soda" Released: September 21, 1997; 2. "Lucky" Released: December 12, 1997; 3. "Planet" Released: March 1, 1998; 4. "Drive" Released: May 21, 1998

Professional ratings
Review scores
Source	Rating
AllMusic	3.5/5 stars

Three Out Change is the debut studio album by Supercar. Released on April 1, 1998, it peaked at number 20 on the Oricon Albums Chart. The album helped establish Supercar as an important and influential Japanese rock band. Music critic Ian Martin has described it as an "epic indie rock/shoegaze album" and "one of the all-time great Japanese rock albums."

== Track listing ==
All lyrics are written by Junji Ishiwatari; all music is composed by Koji Nakamura.

No.	Title	Length
1.	"Cream Soda"	3:13
2.	"(Am I) Confusing You?"	4:43
3.	"Smart"	3:01
4.	"Drive"	3:33
5.	"Greenage"	3:21
6.	"U"	3:31
7.	"Autmatic Wing"	5:12
8.	"Lucky"	4:14
9.	"333"	2:36
10.	"Top 10"	2:52
11.	"My Way"	3:42
12.	"Sea Girl"	2:50
13.	"Happy Talking"	2:47
14.	"Trash & Lemmon"	3:09
15.	"Planet"	5:18
16.	"Yes,"	3:25
17.	"I Need the Sun"	4:25
18.	"Hello"	3:36
19.	"Trip Sky"	12:54

10th anniversary edition bonus disc
No.	Title	Length
1.	"Cream Soda" (previously unreleased version)	3:10
2.	"(Am I) Confusing You?" (previously unreleased version)	4:42
3.	"Drive" (previously unreleased version)	3:37
4.	"Planet -The End of Childhood-" (previously unreleased version)	5:20
5.	"Lucky" (live at Gigantic)	3:15
6.	"Right Now" (live at Gigantic)	2:50
7.	"Trash & Lemmon" (live at Gigantic)	3:34

== Personnel ==
Credits adapted from the liner notes.

- Koji Nakamura – vocals, guitar
- Junji Ishiwatari – guitar
- Miki Furukawa – vocals, bass guitar
- Kodai Tazawa – drums

== Charts ==
Chart	Peak position
Japanese Albums (Oricon)	20
