= Vola and the Oriental Machine =

Japanese rock band

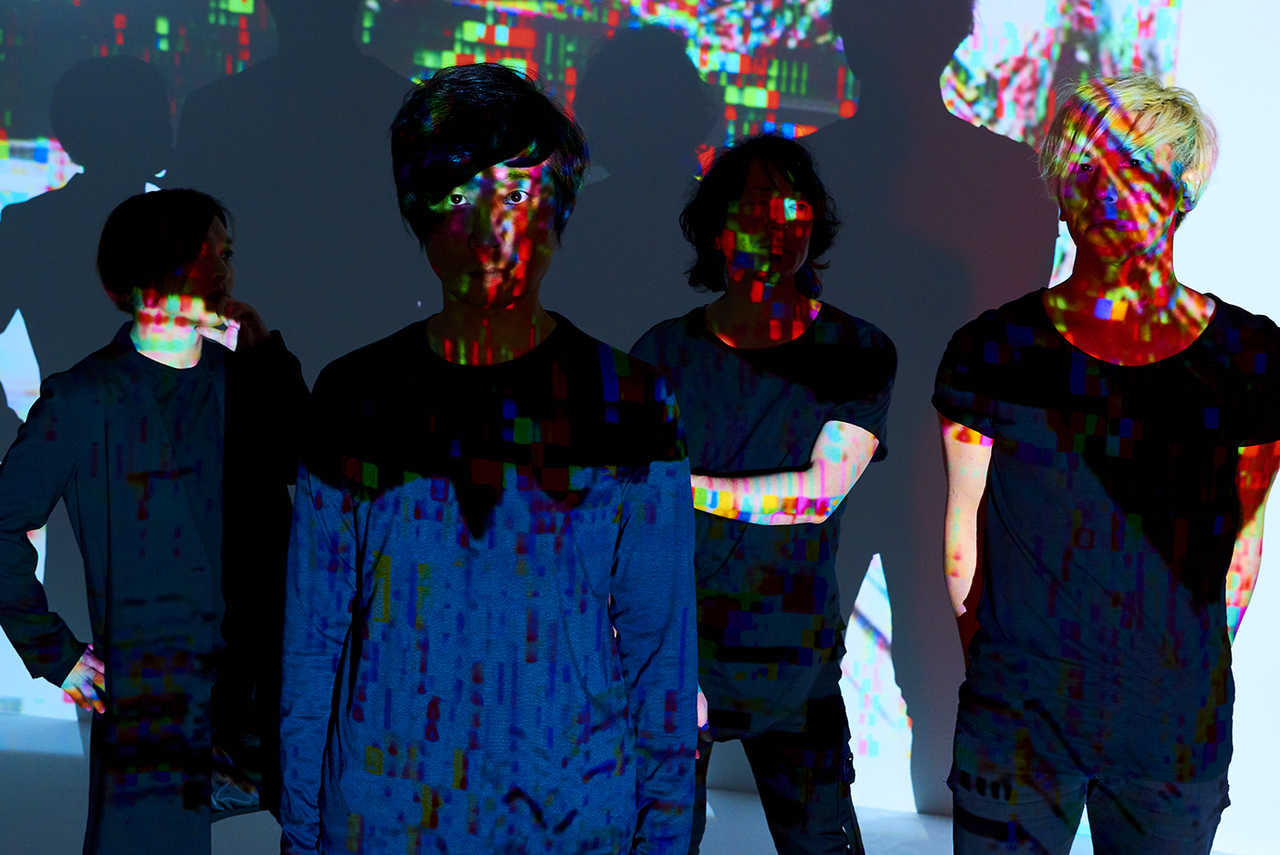

Background information
- Origin: Tokyo, Japan
- Genres: New wave; indie rock; post-punk revival
- Years active: 2005-present
- Labels: Universal Music Japan; Daizawa Records; Music Tabloid Inc.
- Members: Ahito Inazawa (vocals, guitar); Arie Yoshinori (bass); Daiki Nakahata (drums); Eisuke Narahara (guitar, synth, violin)
- Past members: Aoki Yutaka (guitar)
- Website: http://www.volafc.com/

Vola and the Oriental Machine (also known as Vola) is a four-member Japanese rock band formed by Number Girl and ex-Zazen Boys drummer Ahito Inazawa in 2005. The group is named after the soccer team Vola F.C., which was also the name of the short-lived band formed by Inazawa before Number Girl's disbandment in 2002.

== History ==
After parting ways with Zazen Boys due to creative differences in early 2005, drummer Ahito Inazawa formed Vola and the Oriental Machine. Inazawa, well known for his maniac drumming in Number Girl, Zazen Boys and numerous other projects, surprised the Japanese rock scene by ditching his drumsticks and taking the position of a frontman instead. He took on the moniker Vola and handles guitar and vocals in the band. Aoki Yutaka from downy joined him on the guitar, Nakahata Daiki from Syrup16g was recruited to handle the drums and Arie Yoshinori from Lost in Time on the bass guitar.

The band released their debut, a 7-track mini-album Waiting for My Food on January 25, 2006. The band's first full album Android: Like a House Mannequin was released April 11, 2007. The CD includes a remix of Yume Shindan produced by Polysics lead singer, Hiroyuki Hayashi. Music from the album was featured in a commercial for the popular japanese magazine, PS (Pretty Style).

== Members ==
=== Current ===
- Ahito Inazawa (アヒト・イナザワ) Born on June 6, 1973, in Fukuoka, Japan.
- Arie Yoshinori (有江嘉典) Born on December 25, 1969, in Fukuoka, Japan.
- Daiki Nakahata (中畑大樹) Born on July 25, 1974, in Aomori, Japan.
- Eisuke Narahara (楢原英介) Born on August 6, 1981 Chiba, Japan. Previously performing as a support member after Aoki Yutaka's departure, Narahara, joined the band as a full-time member on December 1, 2008.

=== Past ===
- Aoki Yutaka (青木裕) Born on January 29, 1970, in Ibaraki, Japan, died March 19, 2018. Withdrew from the band on September 30, 2008, in order to devote more time with instrumental rock band unkie. Post-rock band downy guitarist.

== Discography ==
=== Albums ===
- [2006.01.25] Waiting for My Food (mini)
1. Principle of Machine
2. A Communication Refusal Desire
3. Concour
4. Nageri to Kasuppa
5. Yume Shindan
6. Fatal Incident (Please Take My Breath Away)
7. Song of Ruin
- [2007.04.11] Android: Like a House Mannequin
1. Oriental Machine
2. Mexico Pub
3. Waiting for My Food
4. Hane no Hikari (album ver.)
5. Mind Control
6. Food's Next
7. Blue Song
8. Yume Shindan (Carte.......Nashi.......mix)
9. To-Ki-Me-I-Te Tonight flight
10. The Counterattack of the Dreamer (Yumemibito no Gyakushu)
- [2008.10.08] Halan'na-ca Darkside (mini)
1. S.E.
2. Self-Defense
3. An Imitation's Superstar
4. 深海における捕食行動考 (Interlude)
5. Soft Genocide
6. 人造人間症候群 (Interlude)
7. Internal Division
8. X線技師の苦悩 (Interlude)
9. Double Standard
- [2009.07.29] Sa-Ka-Na Electric Device
1. Oriental Melancholy
2. Turning Turning
3. Weekend Lovers
4. Dark Emperor
5. No Dream
6. In the Morning
7. The Sea of the Sand
8. A Sick Island
9. Dead or Dance!!
10. Kirakira Future days
- [2010.09.22] Principle
1. The Empire of Vola
2. Thank You My Force
3. Risky the Stars
4. Magic Tantric Dancehall
5. Rough Consensus: 特定問題に関する「集団の感覚」
6. Flag
7. 80s Man
8. Hello Darkness, My New World
9. Panic in the Tokyo
10. The Beginning of the Beginning
- [2019.04.03] Transducer
1. Hangover & Volafc.Com
2. Mac-Roy
3. Rare Case a Windows
4. Perfect Yellow
5. Winter Ghost
6. Parallel lines
7. Last Dance

=== Singles ===
- [2006.10.25] Hane no Hikari
1. Hane no Hikari
2. Comeback in Darkness
3. Kamu Neko
- [2009.06.17] 50/50
1. Weekend Lovers
2. Sweet Men
