= Zazen Boys =

Japanese rock band

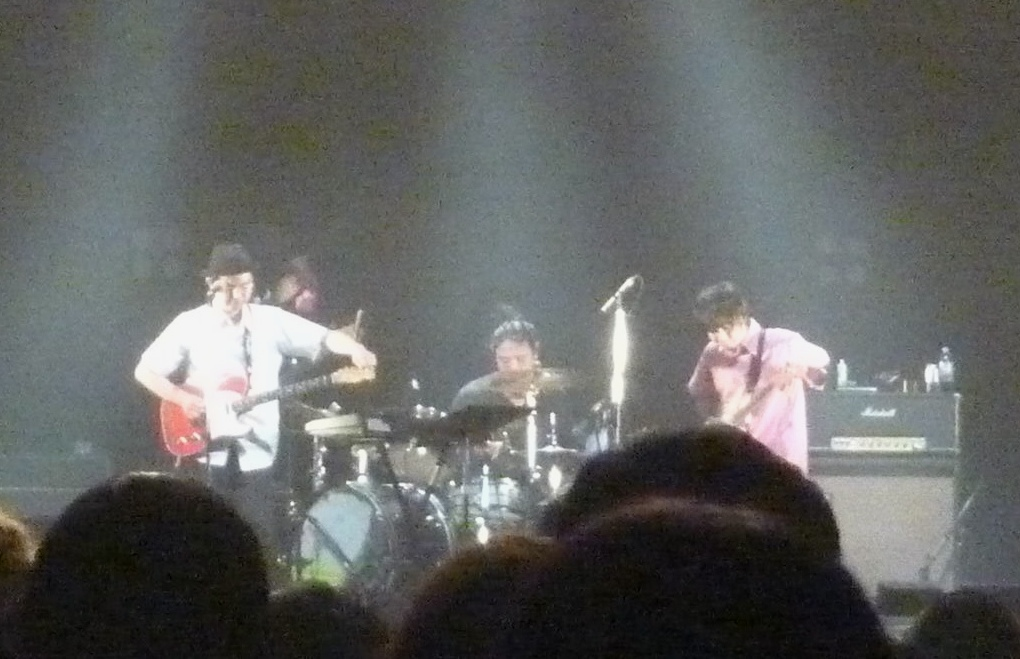
- Performing live at the end of 2011

Background information
- Origin: Tokyo, Japan
- Genres: Indie rock, math rock, jam, new wave
- Years active: 2003–present
- Label: Matsuri Studio
- Spinoffs: Vola and the Oriental Machine
- Spinoff of: Number Girl
- Members: Shutoku Mukai; Miya; Sō Yoshikane; Atsushi Matsushita
- Past members: Ahito Inazawa; Hidekazu Hinata; Ichirō Yoshida

Zazen Boys is a Japanese rock band formed by former Number Girl guitarist and vocalist Shutoku Mukai. Stylistically, their music consists mostly of complex rhythmic songs reminiscent of math rock, as well as extended improvisational songs during live performances.

== History ==
After the breakup of Number Girl, Shutoku Mukai began touring solo under the moniker Mukai Shutoku Acoustic and Electric. Although initially performing new versions of Number Girl songs, he quickly developed many that would appear on Zazen Boys' first album. After touring through June 2003, Shutoku commissioned friend and former Number Girl drummer Ahito Inazawa, and after former Art-School bassist Hidekazu Hinata and guitarist Sō Yoshikane (formerly of Kicking the Lion) joined, the first incarnation of Zazen Boys was formed.

Using Shutoku's experimental mindset, influenced by Buddhist chants, hip-hop, funk, punk, and improvisational jazz, Zazen Boys achieved unexpected success. They released Zazen Boys and went on successful tour. During this time, the band released the single "Hantōmei Shōjo Kankei" (半透明少女関係), as well as the acclaimed live album Matsuri Session 2.26.2004 Tokyo. Five months after their debut, Zazen Boys II was released to even more critical acclaim. In early 2005, Inazawa left to form his own band, Vola and the Oriental Machine. Whether or not the split occurred due to personal or creative differences remains unclear. Undaunted, Shutoku quickly recruited session drummer Atsushi Matsushita to replace Inazawa. Zazen Boys recorded a maxi single "Himitsu Girl's Top Secret", in July 2005. They continued to release live recordings, the online-only album Live at Osaka, Matsuri Session Live at Yaon, and Matsuri Session 12.27.2005 Tokyo, as well as Live at Shibuya, an iTunes-exclusive performance from the opening of the Shibuya Apple Store.

In early 2006 the band released Zazen Boys III. Zazen Boys III featured the improvisational and experimental elements prominent in live performances, and was met with more mixed reactions from fans and critics than their prior releases. The next month, a limited edition collection of improvised studio tracks, Live at Matsuri Studio, went on sale at concerts. For the rest of 2006, the band toured constantly, releasing another online live album, "Zazen Boys Live at Okinawa 2006". In early 2007, Hidekazu left Zazen Boys to pursue other projects, and was replaced by former Nine Days Wonder and 12939db bassist Ichirō Yoshida. On September 17, 2008, the band released their fourth studio album, Zazen Boys 4. The album marked a change in the band's sound, drawing heavier on synthesizer and funk elements.

Additionally, Zazen Boys have contributed songs to several movie soundtracks. Yaji and Kita: The Midnight Pilgrims (真夜中の弥次さん喜多さん, Mayonaka no Yaji-san Kita-san) was mostly original Zazen Boys tracks, and an alternate version of "Jimonjitō" (自問自答) was featured on the soundtrack to Canary (カナリア, Kanaria).

On June 4, 2018, Mukai announced on his blog that Miya, bassist/vocalist of 385 and former bassist/vocalist of Bleach, will be joining Zazen Boys as their new bassist (after Yoshida's departure).

== Members ==
Current members

- Shutoku Mukai (向井秀徳, Mukai Shutoku) – vocals, guitar, synthesizer (2003–present)
- So Yoshikane (佐藤吉兼聡, Yoshikane So) – guitar (2003–present)
- MIYA – bass (2018–present)
- Atsushi Matsushita (松下敦, Matsushita Atsushi) – drums (2005–present)

Former members

- Ahito Inazawa (アヒト・イナザワ, Inazawa Ahito) – drums (2003–2005)
- Hidekazu Hinata (日向秀和, Hinata Hidekazu) – bass (2003–2007)
- Ichirō Yoshida (吉田一郎, Yoshida Ichirō) – bass (2007–2017)

== Discography ==
=== Singles ===
- "Hantōmei Shōjo Kankei" (半透明少女関係) (2004)
- "Himitsu Girl's Top Secret" (2005)
- "I Don't Wanna Be With You" (2007)

=== Albums ===
- Zazen Boys (2004)
- Zazen Boys II (2004)
- Zazen Boys III (2006)
- At the Matsuri Studio (2006, limited edition instrumental album)
- Zazen Boys 4 (2008)
- Stories (すとーりーず, Sutōrīzu) (2012)
- Rando (らんど, Rando) (2024)

=== Live albums ===
- Matsuri Session 2・26 2004 Tokyo (2004)
- Zazen Boys Live at Osaka (2005, online-only)
- Live at Shibuya iTunes Store (2005)
- Matsuri Session Live at Yaon (2005)
- Matsuri Session 12・27 2005 Tokyo (2005)
- Zazen Boys Live at Okinawa (2006, online-only)

=== Compilations and Soundtracks ===
- It's Only Rock and Roll (But We Like It): A Tribute to the Rolling Stones (2003)
- オリジナル・サウンドトラック「真夜中の野次さん喜多さん」 (Original Soundtrack Mayonaka no Yaji-San Kita-San) (2005)
- オリジナル・サウンドトラック「カナリア」 (Original Soundtrack Canary) (2005)
