= Koji Nakamura =

Japanese musician

- Also known as: Nakako, NYANTORA, iLL
- Origin: Towada, Aomori, Japan
- Genre: Rock
- Years active: 1995–Current
- Labels: Ki/oon Records (1997–2005)

Koji Nakamura (中村 弘二, Nakamura Kōji; born September 28, 1977 in Towada, Aomori) is a Japanese musician who is most famous for being the lead singer/songwriter in the Japanese band Supercar. His music style in general involves drone-like guitar riffs and mixed in raw electronica. He presently records music under the names iLL and Nakamura Koji, and also participates in a band called Lama.

== Musician history ==
Originating from Aomori Prefecture, Nakamura was convinced by his friend, Jyunji Ishiwatari to follow up on an advertisement posted in a local magazine by Miki Furukawa looking for fellow musicians. After Kōdai Tazawa, a middle school acquaintance of Nakamura and Junji, joined in as the drummer, the band Supercar was formed.

Supercar, which released its influential debut album Three Out Change in 1998, has been characterized as having "almost foundational importance to 21st century Japanese indie rock" and music critic Ian Martin has called it "one of the all-time great Japanese rock albums." Nakamura played guitar, sang vocals, and wrote all of the music.

For 10 years (1995–2005), Supercar produced different indie styled songs, played in rock concerts and festivals across Japan, and released several albums. Their later albums incorporated more electronic music into their work.

In 1999, Nakamura started an electronic solo project entitled Nyantora. His project was done at the same time Supercar began to release electronica themed albums, such as Futurama and Highvision.

In 2005, Supercar broke up because the members decided to go off in different musical directions. Nakamura began recording under the name iLL in 2006. iLL's musical style is similar to Supercar's latter style in many aspects. The band hasn't gone into a completely electronic direction like Supercar's Highvision era, but aims for a more zoning style of music.

Globally, Nakamura's music is known for being used in the anime Eureka Seven, its spin-off film, the film Ping Pong, the anime Viper's Creed, the anime No. 6 and the anime Un Go.

In 2011, Nakamura and former supercar bandmate Miki Furukawa formed the band called Lama. Lama jump-started their formation with a single entitled Spell which has been used as an opening theme for the anime No.6. He also serves as the composer for the anime series Eureka Seven: AO.

In April 2014 he released a new solo album, "Masterpeace", under his own name.

== Solo discography ==
=== As Nyantora ===
- 99-00 (May 9, 2001)
- COSMOS (April 2, 2003)
- Yoru o Wasurenai/97-03 (夜を忘れなさい/97-03; January 27, 2006)
- Fade In Fade Out (この作品はフェードインフェードアウトで構成されています 音があらわれては消えるの繰り返しただそれだけ, Kono Sakuhin wa Fēdo In Fēdo Auto de Kōsei Sareteimasu, Oto ga Arawarete wa Kieru no Kurikaeshi tada Soredake; December 1, 2009)
- White E.P. (May 18, 2011)
- High Strangeness (September 23, 2013)

=== As iLL ===
Albums

- Sound by iLL (May 31, 2006)
- Dead Wonderland (March 5, 2007)
- Dawn ~ Yoake (Dawn～夜明け; February 21, 2007) with Yuji Katsui
- Rock Album (August 6, 2008)
- Force (August 26, 2009)
- ∀ (June 23, 2010) - Collaboration & Remix album
- iLL the WorLd (September 7, 2010) - American compilation album
- Minimal Maximum (October 13, 2010)

Singles

- Call My Name (May 20, 2007)
- R.O.C.K. (January 28, 2009)
- Kiss (May 27, 2009)
- Deadly Lovely (September 29, 2009)

DVDs

- iLLusion by iLL (April 4, 2007)

=== As Koji Nakamura ===
- Eureka Seven AO Original Soundtrack 1 (June 27, 2012)
- Eureka Seven AO Original Soundtrack 2 (November 28, 2012)
- Masterpeace (April 30, 2014)
- Epitaph (June 26, 2019)
