= School Girl Distortional Addict =

Studio album by Number Girl
- Released: July 23, 1999
- Studios: Studio Staff, Fukuoka.
- Genres: Alternative rock; indie rock
- Length: 35:50
- Label: Toshiba EMI

Number Girl chronology
School Girl Bye Bye (1997)	School Girl Distortional Addict (1999)	Shibuya Rockstransformed Jōtai (1999)

Professional ratings
Review scores
Source	Rating
Pitchfork	8.3/10
AllMusic	4.5/5 stars
Tiny Mix Tapes	5/5 stars

School Girl Distortional Addict is the second studio album by Japanese rock band Number Girl, released on July 23, 1999. It peaked at number 50 on the Oricon Albums Chart.

== Track listing ==
No.	Title	Length
1.	"Touch" (タッチ, Tatchi)	5:01
2.	"Pixie Dü"	2:06
3.	"Hadashi no Kisetsu" (裸足の季節, Barefoot Season)	2:36
4.	"Young Girl Seventeen Sexually Knowing"	3:47
5.	"Sakura no Dance" (桜のダンス, Sakura no Dansu, Sakura Dance)	2:29
6.	"Nichijō ni Ikiru Shōjo" (日常に生きる少女, Everyday Girl)	5:02
7.	"Kurutte Sōrō" (狂って候, I'm Crazy)	2:06
8.	"Tōmei Shōjo" (透明少女, Transparent Girl)	3:21
9.	"Tenkōsei" (転校生, Transfer Student)	5:02
10.	"Eight Beater"	4:03

== Charts ==
Chart	Peak position
Japanese Albums (Oricon)	50
