= Num-Heavymetallic =

Studio album by Number Girl
- Released: April 26, 2002
- Studio: Tarbox Road Studios, Cassadaga, NY.
- Genre: Alternative rock; indie rock
- Length: 44:54
- Label: Toshiba EMI
- Producer: Dave Fridmann

Number Girl chronology
| Sappukei (2000) | Num-Heavymetallic (2002) |

Professional ratings
Review scores
| Source | Rating |
|---|---|
| Pitchfork | 8.0/10 |

Num-Heavymetallic is the fourth and final studio album by Japanese rock band Number Girl, released on April 26, 2002. It peaked at number 91 on the Oricon Albums Chart.

== Track listing ==
| No. | Title | Length |
|---|---|---|
| 1. | "Num-Heavymetallic" | 4:39 |
| 2. | "Inuzini" | 2:59 |
| 3. | "Num-Ami-Dabutz" | 3:11 |
| 4. | "Tombo the Electric Bloodred" | 4:26 |
| 5. | "Delayed Brain" | 4:03 |
| 6. | "Cibicco-San" (Cibiccoさん) | 4:43 |
| 7. | "Manga Sick" | 3:21 |
| 8. | "Fu•Si•Gi" | 4:10 |
| 9. | "Seiteki Shōjo" (性的少女) | 3:40 |
| 10. | "Frustration in My Blood" | 5:29 |
| 11. | "Kuromegachi na Shōjo" (黒目がちな少女) | 4:18 |

== Charts ==
| Chart | Peak position |
|---|---|
| Japanese Albums (Oricon) | 91 |
