= Shibuya Rockstransformed Jōtai =

Live album by NUMBER GIRL
- Released: December 16, 1999
- Recorded: October 1, 1999
- Venues: Club Quattro, Shibuya, Tokyo.
- Genres: Alternative rock, Indie
- Length: 53:50
- Label: Toshiba EMI

NUMBER GIRL chronology
School Girl Distortional Addict (1999)	Shibuya Rockstransformed Jōtai (1999)	Sappukei (2000)

Shibuya Rockstransformed Jōtai (シブヤRockstransformed状態) is the first live album released by Number Girl in 1999, performed at Shibuya Club Quattro. It features the last day of their "Distortional Discharger" tour supporting their sophomore album, School Girl Distortional Addict.

== Track listing ==
No.	Title	Length
1.	"Eight Beater"	3:52
2.	"Iggy Pop Fan Club"	4:08
3.	"Touch" (タッチ, Tatchi)	4:50
4.	"Sakura no Dance" (桜のダンス, Sakura no Dansu, Sakura Dance)	2:37
5.	"Young Girl Seventeen Sexually Knowing"	4:06
6.	"Tōmei Shōjo" (透明少女, Transparent Girl)	3:27
7.	"Kurutte Sōrō" (狂って候)	3:46
8.	"Destruction Baby"	3:05
9.	"Nichijō ni Ikiru Shōjo" (日常に生きる少女, Everyday Girl)	3:27
10.	"Ware Kiritsu Ikkojin" (我起立一個人)	5:17
11.	"Super Young"	6:09
12.	"Omoide in My Head"	7:03
