= Answer (Supercar album) =

Studio album by Supercar
- Released: February 25, 2004
- Genres: Indie rock, alternative rock, electronic rock, neo-psychedelia
- Length: 59:55
- Label: Ki/oon Records
- Producer: Supercar

Supercar chronology
Highvision (2002)	Answer (2004)

Singles from Answer
- 1. "Recreation" Released: February 14, 2003; 2. "Last Scene" Released: January 28, 2004

Professional ratings
Review scores
Source	Rating
AllMusic	3.5/5 stars

Answer is the fifth and final non-compilation album by the Japanese indie rock band Supercar. It was released on February 25, 2004, and peaked at #18 on the Oricon Albums Chart.

== Track listing ==
No.	Title	Length
1.	"Freehand"	4:54
2.	"Justice Black"	2:54
3.	"Sunshine Fairyland"	2:43
4.	"Wonder Word"	3:38
5.	"BGM"	4:38
6.	"Discord"	4:06
7.	"Harmony"	2:52
8.	"Recreation"	4:57
9.	"Golden Master Key"	5:40
10.	"The World Is Naked"	5:10
11.	"Siren"	8:25
12.	"Last Scene"	4:39
13.	"Time"	5:16
