= Highvision =

Studio album by Supercar
- Released: April 24, 2002
- Genres: Alternative rock, experimental rock, electronica
- Length: 48:13
- Label: Ki/oon Music
- Producer: Supercar

Supercar chronology
| Futurama (2000) | Highvision (2002) | Answer (2004) |

Singles from Highvision
- 1. "Strobolights" Released: May 23, 2001; 2. "Yumegiwa Last Boy" Released: November 21, 2001; 3. "Aoharu Youth" Released: February 6, 2002

Highvision is the fourth album by the Japanese alternative rock band Supercar. It was released on April 24, 2002, and peaked at 11th place on the Oricon Albums Chart. The album is notable for Supercar's continued experimental trajectory starting from their previous album Futurama expanding upon it in Highvision, with the single "Strobolights" not even containing a guitar. The song "Storywriter" was used in the soundtrack of the anime Eureka Seven, which also contains several references to music from the 1980s and 1990s.

In 2007, Rolling Stone Japan listed Highvision as number 86 among its "100 Greatest Japanese Rock Albums of All Time."

== Track list ==
| No. | Title | Length |
|---|---|---|
| 1. | "Starline" | 4:04 |
| 2. | "Warning Bell" | 4:30 |
| 3. | "Storywriter" | 4:23 |
| 4. | "Aoharu Youth" | 5:09 |
| 5. | "Otogi Nation" | 3:29 |
| 6. | "Strobolights" | 4:06 |
| 7. | "I" | 6:14 |
| 8. | "Yumegiwa Last Boy" | 4:11 |
| 9. | "Nijiiro Darkness" | 6:40 |
| 10. | "Silent Yaritori" | 5:27 |
