= Eureka Seven =

Japanese anime television series

- Key visual of the series, featuring Eureka (left) and Renton Thurston (right)

交響詩篇エウレカセブン (Kōkyōshihen Eureka Sebun)
- Genre: Adventure; Mecha; Romance
- Created by: Bones
- Anime television series
- Directed by: Tomoki Kyoda
- Produced by: Atsushi Yukawa; Hirofumi Inagaki; Hiroo Maruyama; Hiroshi Morotomi; Kōtarō Nakayama
- Written by: Dai Satō
- Music by: Naoki Satō
- Studio: Bones
- Licensed by: Crunchyroll; UK: Anime Limited
- Original network: JNN (MBS)
- English network: CA: YTV; SEA: Animax Asia; UK: Viceland; US: Adult Swim (Toonami), Funimation Channel; ZA: Animax, SABC
- Original run: April 17, 2005 – April 2, 2006
- Episodes: 50 + 1 special
Further information
Manga
Written by	Jinsei Kataoka
Illustrated by	Kazuma Kondou
Published by	Kadokawa Shoten
English publisher	AUS: Madman Entertainment; NA: Viz Media
Magazine	Monthly Shōnen Ace
Original run	July 26, 2005 – September 26, 2006
Volumes	6
Manga
Eureka Seven: Gravity Boys and Lifting Girl
Written by	Miki Kizuki
Published by	Kadokawa Shoten
English publisher	NA: Viz Media
Magazine	Comptiq
Original run	May 2005 – September 26, 2006
Volumes	2
Light novel
Written by	Tomonori Sugihara
Illustrated by	Robin Kishiwada
Published by	Kadokawa Shoten
English publisher	NA: Bandai Entertainment
Imprint	Sneaker Bunko
Original run	October 29, 2005 – May 31, 2006
Volumes	4
Anime film
Eureka Seven: Pocketful of Rainbows
Directed by	Tomoki Kyoda (chief); Hiroshi Haraguchi
Produced by	Masahiko Minami
Written by	Tomoki Kyoda
Music by	Naoki Satō
Studio	Bones; Kinema Citrus
Licensed by	Crunchyroll
Released	April 25, 2009
Runtime	115 minutes
Light novel
Eureka Seven: Pocketful of Rainbows
Written by	Tomonori Sugihara
Illustrated by	Hiroki Kazui; Seiji
Published by	Kadokawa Shoten
Imprint	Sneaker Bunko
Published	May 1, 2009
Manga
Eureka Seven AO
Written by	Yūichi Katō
Published by	Kadokawa Shoten
Magazine	Monthly Shōnen Ace
Original run	January 26, 2012 – September 26, 2013
Volumes	5
Manga
Eureka Seven AO: Save a Prayer
Written by	Ran Fudou
Published by	Kadokawa Shoten
Magazine	Newtype A
Original run	February 10, 2012 – June 10, 2013
Volumes	2
Anime television series
Eureka Seven AO
Directed by	Tomoki Kyoda
Written by	Shō Aikawa
Music by	Kōji Nakamura
Studio	Bones
Licensed by	Crunchyroll
Original network	MBS, TBS, CBC, BS-TBS
English network	SEA: Animax Asia; US: Funimation Channel, Crunchyroll Channel
Original run	April 13, 2012 – November 20, 2012
Episodes	24 + OVA + ONA
Manga
Psalms of Planets Eureka Seven New Order
Written by	Oonogi Hiroshi
Illustrated by	Miyama Fugin
Published by	Kadokawa Shoten
Magazine	Comptiq
Original run	June 8, 2012 – May 10, 2014
Volumes	2
Manga
Eureka Seven Nano
Written by	Katsuwo
Published by	Kadokawa Shoten
Magazine	4-koma Nano A
Original run	July 9, 2012 – January 9, 2013
Volumes	1
Anime film series
Eureka Seven: Hi-Evolution
Directed by	Tomoki Kyoda (Note: Chief director (総監督, Sō Kantoku) in Part 1); Hisatoshi Shimizu (I)
Written by	Dai Satō (I & II); Tomoki Kyoda (III); Yūichi Nomura (III)
Music by	Naoki Satō
Studio	Bones
Licensed by	Crunchyroll; SEA: Odex; UK: Anime Limited
Released	September 16, 2017 (I); November 10, 2018 (II); November 26, 2021 (III)
Runtime	92 minutes (I); 90 minutes (II); 116 minutes (III)
Original net animation
Eureka Seven: Hi-Evolution Zero
Studio	Bones
Released	January 15, 2020 – January 29, 2020
Runtime	5 minutes each
Episodes	3
- icon

Eureka Seven, known in Japan as Psalms of Planets Eureka Seven (Japanese: 交響詩篇エウレカセブン, Hepburn: Kōkyōshihen Eureka Sebun; lit. "Symphonic Psalms Eureka Seven"), is a Japanese anime television series created and produced by Bones. The series was directed by Tomoki Kyoda, with series composition by Dai Satō, character designs by Kenichi Yoshida and music by Naoki Satō. Eureka Seven tells the story of Renton Thurston and the outlaw group Gekkostate, his relationship with the enigmatic mecha pilot Eureka, and the mystery of the Coralians. The fifty-episode series aired on MBS between April 2005 and April 2006.

The series spawned six manga adaptations, a light novel, three video games and a feature-length anime film which was released in April 2009. A sequel anime series, titled Eureka Seven AO, aired 24 episodes between April and November 2012. A manga version of Eureka Seven AO was serialized in Monthly Shōnen Ace between January 2012 and October 2013. Eureka Seven was well received by critics and earned several awards at numerous award shows in Japan, most notably the 2006 Tokyo International Anime Fair.

== Overview ==
=== Setting ===
Scub Coral
Eureka Seven takes place in the year 12005 and it has been 10,000 years after humanity has made a mass exodus into space, due to the arrival of the Scub Coral (スカブ・コーラル, Sukabu Kōraru), an intelligent, sentient life who merged with the planet, forcing the humans to abandon it. In the current timeline, the remnants of humanity are now settled on an unknown planet known as the Land of Kanan, but the majority of the surface of this planet is now covered by a rock-like surface formed by the Scub Coral. The theory that the Scub Coral is an intelligent life form was proposed by the scientist Adroc Thurston, who also claimed the Scub is looking for mutual co-existence with humanity. All theories and information about the Scub Coral being a sentient being are kept from the general population. In addition to being the surface of the planet, the Scub Coral has several physical manifestations, called Coralians (コーラリアン, Kōrarian), that are observed throughout the series. These manifestations are either natural occurrences or a response to attacks from humans. The manifestations are:
Command Cluster Coralian
The Command Cluster is a large concentration of the Scub Coral which acts as the central mind for the rest of its "body". It stores all the information the Scub has collected over the last 10,000 years, and keeps the rest of the Scub Coral in a dormant state.
Kute-class Coralian
A Kute-class is massive sphere of concentrated energy that materializes suddenly in the skies. Though it is a rare natural occurrence, they can be artificially triggered by causing heavy damage to the Scub Coral. The disappearance of a Kute causes a massive release of energy, ravaging the surrounding landscape and lowering the Trapar count in the area to almost non-existent levels.
Antibody Coralians
Antibody Coralians are, as the name suggests, creatures created by the Scub Coral to destroy anything nearby that might be causing it harm. They are unleashed in massive swarms through a Kute-class Coralian when the Scub Coral is threatened or attacked. These antibodies can range in size from as small as a wheelbarrow, or as large as a bomber plane. Their shapes vary wildly, from eyeballs to flying slugs to giant hovering flower-like objects. Most forms are based on the sea creatures they absorbed when they just started their 'growth'. Their powers are: sending lasers in profusion from their bodies, thus being able to destroy large aircraft, burrowing into a victim's body and imploding it (unconfirmed), and creating a spherical void, which makes anything within its surface area to vanish. Antibody Coralians generally appear in response to deliberate attacks on the Scub Coral. They appear for 1246 seconds (20 minutes 46 seconds) - which is the amount of time the Seven Swell phenomenon is active. After those 1246 seconds, they crumble to dust. Their appearances are that of basic invertebrates such as flat worms, mollusks, and cnidaria. One of each kind appears in Another Century's Episode 3: The Final and Super Robot Wars Z.
Human-form Coralians
Human-form Coralians are beings created by the Scub Coral in the form of humans. They are regarded by scientists as emissaries of the Scub Coral, sent to learn about humanity. Humans have attempted to create their own artificial human-form Coralians, but the results are often less than satisfactory. As shown with Eureka in the sequel series, human-form Coralians are biologically capable of reproducing the same way as humans do; she gave birth to a daughter and son. However, due to her children being Human-Coralian hybrids, the high level of Trapar would be too dangerous for them.
Trapar waves and lifting
In Eureka Seven, as a result of the Scub Coral covering the planet, the atmosphere is permeated by an enigmatic energy known as Transparence Light Particles (トランサパランス・ライト・パーティクル, Toransaparansu Raito Pātikuru), dubbed Trapar (トラパー, Torapā) waves for short. Norbu, the Vodarac leader, states that all thought carries with it energy. As a result, a sentient life form on the scale of the Scub Coral produces a tremendous amount of energy. The most important use of Trapar energy is its use as a method of propulsion for flight-capable vehicles.
Though Trapar-propelled airships are relatively common, using Trapar waves for "lifting" (リフティング, Rifutingu; or "reffing", according to some fan translations, as well as official translations in some countries) is their predominant use. Lifting uses surfboard-like devices called "reflection boards" ("ref boards" (リフボード, Rifubōdo) for short) to ride Trapar waves in a manner similar to surfing, and is a popular sport in the series. The most grandiose use of Trapar—massive humanoid fightercraft—are a recent development, made possible by the discovery of bizarre alien life-forms within the Scub Coral.

=== Plot ===
The series focuses on Renton Thurston, the fourteen-year-old son of Adrock Thurston, a military researcher who died saving the world. He lives what he considers a boring life with his grandfather in a boring town. He loves lifting, a sport similar to surfing but with trapar, a substance abundant throughout the air, as the medium. He dreams of joining the renegade group Gekkostate, led by his idol Holland Novak, a legendary lifter.

An opportunity to do so literally falls into his lap when a large mechanical robot, called the Nirvash type ZERO, and Eureka, its pilot and a member of Gekkostate, crash into Renton's room. Renton's grandfather orders him to deliver a special part to the Nirvash called the "Amita Drive", which releases the immense power dormant within the type ZERO called the "Seven Swell Phenomenon". Afterwards, Renton is invited to join Gekkostate, where he quickly discovers that the behind-the-scenes life of Gekkostate is hardly as glamorous or as interesting as printed in the glossy pages of their magazine, ray=out. Only one thing makes it all worthwhile for him: the presence of Eureka, the mysterious pilot of the Nirvash. Renton, Eureka, and the Gekkostate embark on an adventure that will shape their future as well as the world's.

== Development ==
The series was made by Bones and co-produced by Bandai Entertainment. Bandai Entertainment provided the title and handled the creative aspects of the series. Bandai had originally proposed a mecha anime series to the animation studio Bones. The studio had initially rejected it, but later reversed its position because it had already planned to create an anime using mecha designs by Shoji Kawamori. With the appointment of director Tomoki Kyoda and writer Dai Satō, Bandai's proposal was more or less scrapped and the staff began work on their own series that would become Eureka Seven.

While conceptualizing Eureka Seven, Kyoda "wanted something that reflected the music and the subculture of his generation—and a love story." As such the show contains several references from music of the 1980s and the 1990s, and almost all of the show's episodes are named after real songs, composed by both Japanese and foreign artists.

The director wished to design the series as one that would at first focus on the personal elements and conflicts of the characters, then subsequently move the framework into a broader scale and perspective. The series' two halves each have their own very clear focus that reflects this design choice.

With the premise of the surfer robots in mind, Satō interviewed several real-life surfers and came to the conclusion that they are close to nature. From this perception, he envisioned the environmental thematic as central point of the story. He said "I thought it might be an effective message for children, especially in Japan. It's pretty veiled. I didn't want to be preachy."

== Release ==
=== Anime ===
Eureka Seven consists of fifty episodes which aired from April 17, 2005, to April 2, 2006, on the Mainichi Broadcasting System and Tokyo Broadcasting System networks.

Eureka Seven was available for online viewing on the Adult Swim Fix, Adult Swim's online video service before its televised debut on the Adult Swim channel between April 16, 2006, and ended on April 29, 2007. Adult Swim traditionally cut down the opening and ending themes from each episode to fit the series to American television's time restraints, which resulted in the final episode's first airing having actual content cut from it as the episode originally had no theme song sequences; it was re-aired properly the following week. In Canada, Eureka Seven premiered on YTV's Bionix block on September 8, 2006.

Bandai Entertainment and its affiliates distributed the English version of Eureka Seven. It was released in the United States and Canada by Bandai Visual USA, in the United Kingdom by Beez Entertainment, and in Australia by Madman Entertainment. The first translated Region 1 DVD volume of the series was released on April 25, 2006, in the U.S., while the European Region 2 version was released on September 25, 2006. The English version was produced by Bang Zoom! Entertainment in Burbank, California. Following the 2012 closure of Bandai Entertainment, Funimation acquired the rights to the TV series and re-released the series on Blu-ray and DVD in 2014.

An anime sequel titled Eureka Seven AO began airing on April 12, 2012, and ended on November 20, 2012. There is a total of 24 episodes. It has been released in Japan on Blu-ray and DVD, along with an OVA titled "The Flower Fields of Jungfrau". An ONA episode, serving as an expanded finale for the series, was released in five parts from January 10 to March 2, 2017. On May 16, 2013, Funimation announced the official release date in English dub. The first twelve dubbed episodes were released on DVD/Blu-ray on August 13, 2013, and the rest of the series released on October 15, 2013. On January 6, 2014, Manga Entertainment released the first half of the series, with the second half released on March 10.

=== Music ===
Eureka Seven uses ten pieces of theme music. The opening themes of Eureka Seven are "Days" by Flow (episodes 1–13), "Shōnen Heart" (少年ハート, Shōnen Hāto) by Home Made Kazoku (episodes 14–26), "Taiyō no Mannaka e" (太陽の真ん中へ; "To the Center of the Sun"), by Bivattchee (episodes 27–32, 34–39) and "Sakura" by Nirgilis (episodes 40–49). The ending themes are "Himitsu Kichi" (秘密基地; "Secret Base") by Kozue Takada (episodes 1–13, 26), "Fly Away", by Asami Izawa (episodes 14–25), "Tip Taps Tip", by Halcali (episodes 27–39) and "Canvas", by Coolon (episodes 40–49). The two insert songs are "Storywriter", by Supercar and "Niji" (虹; "Rainbow"), by Denki Groove (episode 50).

The soundtrack music is available on three different albums composed by Naoki Satō and a variety of other artists who composed insert songs used in the series. The first and second soundtrack albums were released on November 2, 2005, and April 5, 2006, respectively. The third soundtrack, titled Eureka Seven: Complete Best include the full-length versions of the opening and ending themes for both the series and game, as well as the insert song for the final episode.

Eureka Seven: AO features six pieces of theme music. For the 13 first episodes, the opening theme is "Escape" performed by Hemenway and the ending theme is "stand by me" by Stereopony. Starting with episode 14, the opening theme changes to "Bravelue" (ブレイブルー, Bureiburū) performed by Flow and the ending theme changes to "Iolite" (アイオライト, Aioraito) performed by joy. The two insert songs are "Parallel Sign" and "Seven Swell", both performed by LAMA.

== Media ==
=== Manga ===
A manga adaptation of the original anime was created by Jinsei Kataoka and Kazuma Kondou. The manga was published by Kadokawa Shoten and began serialization in Monthly Shōnen Ace from the March 2005 issue and ended in the January 2007 issue, with a total of 23 chapters. The chapters were later compiled into six volumes. Viz Media published the manga digitally. A second manga titled Eureka Seven: Gravity Boys and Lifting Girl (エウレカセ ブン グラヴィティボーイズ&リフティングガール, Eureka Sebun Guravuiti Bōizu & Rifutingu Gāru) by Miki Kizuki, features the protagonists of the video games New Wave and New Vision. It was published by Kadokawa Shoten and serialized in Comptiq magazine. Two volumes were released on November 7, 2005, and September 26, 2006, respectively. Viz Media also published this series digitally. A manga adapting a proposed alternative ending of the series, titled Psalms of Planets Eureka Seven New Order was serialized in Comptiq by Kadokawa Shoten between June 2012 and May 2013 and compiled into two volumes.

On December 22, 2011, Kadokawa Shoten's Monthly Shōnen Ace magazine announced that a sequel manga titled Eureka Seven: AO based on the sequel series would be launched in their January 2012 issue. It featured an original story by Bones and was illustrated by Yūichi Katō. The manga concluded in October 2013, with a total of 21 chapters spanning over five volumes. A spin-off manga titled Eureka Seven AO: Save a Prayer began in February in Kadokawa Shoten's Newtype A and concluded in June 2013, and focuses on a girl named Yuna and her two friends as they make their way from becoming trainees in Generation Bleu's Headquarters. It was compiled into two volumes. A manga titled Eureka Seven Nano was published as a 4koma in Kadokawa Shoten's 4-koma Nano A from July 2012 to January 2013, and featured characters from the AO series. It was compiled into one volume.

=== Light novel ===
A light novel series written by Tomonori Sugihara and illustrated by Robin Kishiwada was published by Kadokawa Shoten under their male oriented Sneaker Bunko label in 2005 and 2006. Bandai Entertainment released all four volumed in English between 2009 and 2011. A novelization of the film Pocketful of Rainbows sharing the same name, also written by Tomonori Sugihara and illustrated by Hiroki Kazui and Seiji was released on May 1, 2009.

=== Video games ===
Eureka Seven has four video games, developed by Bandai and later Namco Bandai Games. The first to be released was Eureka Seven Vol. 1: The New Wave (エウレカセブン TR1:NEW WAVE, Eureka Sebun TR1: Nyū Uēbu), which was released in Japan on October 27, 2005, and in North America on October 24, 2006. The game features a different cast of characters and takes place two years before the anime. A sequel, Eureka Seven Vol. 2: The New Vision (エウレカセブン NEW VISION, Eureka Sebun: Nyū Bijon), was released in Japan on May 11, 2006, and in North America on April 17, 2007. New Vision takes place two years after the events of New Wave. Both games were released on the PlayStation 2 and feature the theme song "Realize", sung by Flow. A PlayStation Portable game sharing the same name of the anime was released on April 6, 2006, in Japan. This game is based on the events from the first half of the show. An action game based on the AO sequel series, Eureka Seven: AO Attack the Legend, was released on the PlayStation 3 on September 20, 2012.

=== Films ===
A theatrical adaptation, Eureka Seven: Good Night, Sleep Tight, Young Lovers (Japanese: 交響詩篇エウレカセブン ポケットが虹でいっぱい, Hepburn: Kōkyōshihen Eureka Sebun: Poketto ga Niji de Ippai; subtitle literally "Pocketful of Rainbows"), was first announced in the May 2008 issue of Newtype; it was publicly released on April 25, 2009, during Golden Week, with the animation production handled by Kinema Citrus. It contained a new mythos in an alternative universe, despite still featuring Renton and Eureka as the main characters, and confirming the events of the original series happened in a parallel world. The main theme song for the film is "Space Rock", by iLL.

Good Night, Sleep Tight, Young Lovers screened at select theaters nationwide in the U.S. for a one night–only special event on September 24, 2009, courtesy of Fathom Events. The film also played at the Fantasia Festival in Montreal on July 28, 2009.

A second three-part theatrical adaptation, Eureka Seven: Hi-Evolution (交響詩篇エウレカセブン ハイエボリューション, Kōkyōshihen Eureka Sebun: Haieboryūshon), was announced on March 17, 2017. The film trilogy takes place before and during the events of the original series, as well as having an original story. The first film, Eureka Seven: Hi-Evolution 1 (交響詩篇エウレカセブン ハイエボリューション1, Kōkyōshihen Eureka Sebun: Haieboryūshon 1), was released on September 16, 2017. It shows the "First Summer of Love" phenomenon, previously only alluded to in the series and retells the "Charles and Ray" arc (mainly episodes 22–27) of the original. The second film, taking place in an alternative universe and focusing on Anemone, was released on November 10, 2018, under the title Anemone: Eureka Seven Hi-Evolution (ANEMONE/交響詩篇エウレカセブン ハイエボリューション, Anemone: Kōkyōshihen Eureka Sebun: Haieboryūshon). The last film, titled Eureka: Eureka Seven Hi-Evolution (EUREKA/交響詩篇エウレカセブン ハイエボリューション, Eureka: Kōkyōshihen Eureka Sebun: Haieboryūshon) was originally planned for release in 2019, but was delayed to early summer 2021. It was delayed again to November 26, 2021. A three-episode short ONA prequel series for the movies, Eureka Seven: Hi-Evolution Zero, was released from January 15 to January 29, 2020.

At Anime Boston, Masahiko Minami confirmed that the first film of the trilogy would premiere in Japan, the United States, the United Kingdom, France, Australia, Singapore, Malaysia, Indonesia, and Thailand in Fall 2017, and that Funimation would distribute the film in the United States. Madman Entertainment distributed the film in Australia and New Zealand. Anime Limited distributed the film in the UK. Odex distributed the film in Southeast Asian territories. Crunchyroll screened the third film in North America on May 17 and 18, 2022.

== Reception ==
Towards the end of its original Japanese run, Eureka Seven won multiple awards at the 2006 Tokyo International Anime Fair, including Best Television Series, Best Screenplay for Dai Satō, and Best Character Designs for Kenichi Yoshida. Yoshida, the series' main animator and character designer, also received an individual award at the 10th Animation Kobe Awards in September 2005. The series also won an award at the 20th Digital Content Grand Prix in Japan in January 2006. At the Anime Expo 2006 SPJA Awards, Eureka Seven won the award for Best Television Series, and Best Female Character for Eureka. Anime Insider voted it "Best DVD Series of the Year" in 2006. During a conference in 2010, writer Dai Satō claimed that many anime fans dismissed Eureka Seven as a clone of Neon Genesis Evangelion without even watching it.

== See also ==
- Deadman Wonderland, a manga series written and illustrated by Jinsei Kataoka and Kazuma Kondou
