= School Girl Bye Bye =

Studio album by Number Girl
- Released: November 6, 1997
- Studios: Studio Staff, Fukuoka.
- Genres: Alternative rock, Indie
- Label: Automatic Kiss/K.O.G.A

Number Girl chronology
School Girl Bye Bye (1997)	School Girl Distortional Addict (1999)

Professional ratings
Review scores
Source	Rating
AllMusic	4/5 stars

School Girl Bye Bye is the debut studio album by the Japanese indie band Number Girl.

== Track listing ==
1. "Omoide in My Head"
2. "Ōatari no Kisetsu" (大あたりの季節)
3. "Sentimental Kajō" (センチメンタル過剰, Senchimentaru Kajō)
4. "September Girlfriend"
5. "Iggy Pop Fan Club"
6. "Mizuiro Kakumei" (水色革命)
7. "Nagisa ni te" (渚にて)
8. "Summer of California '73"
9. "Mini Grammer"
10. "Ware Kiritsu Yuiga Hitori" (我起立唯我一人)
11. "4 Track Professional"
