= Michael Holland (musician) =

American songwriter and musician (born 1969)

Michael Holland Michael Holland playing live 2026, the Martha Bassett Show, Reeves Theater, Elkin, NC. USA: Rock; Pop; Americana; bluegrass; blues
- Born: Michael Holland; March 5, 1969 (age 57); Charlotte, North Carolina, U.S.
- Occupations: Musician, songwriter, producer
- Instruments: Guitar, bass, keyboards, fiddle
- Years active: 1991–present
- Labels: No.6 Records; Elektra; Yep Roc Records; MoRisen; Sit-n-Spin; Moll Tonträger; Holidays for Quince; Euramerican Soul

Michael Abbott Holland (born March 5, 1969), is an American songwriter, musician, and producer whose career began with the alternative rock band Jennanykind in the 1990s and early 2000s. His music and other recordings, with Jennyanykind, The Holland Bros. and solo, have appeared in films such as Desert Saints, The World Made Straight, and the Jody Hill film The Legacy of a Whitetail Deer Hunter, and series such as Apple TV+'s Dickinson, F/X's Baskets, and HBO's The Righteous Gemstones. Holland also appeared with his twin brother Mark in The Righteous Gemstones Season 1 Episode 3 as musicians at a church performing their production of the old hymnal The Old Country Church. Holland's songs have been recorded and performed by artists such as Dean Wareham, Dean & Britta,, Leftover Salmon, and Academy Award nominated actor Eric Roberts.

== Biography ==
Holland is originally from the Charlotte area in North Carolina, US. He is a son of John and Betty Jo Holland. He grew up in Monroe, North Carolina and spent his teenage years in Anderson, South Carolina after the family moved there in 1982. After graduating from Clemson University in 1991, he moved to Chapel Hill, North Carolina to focus on music. He has an older brother, John Jr. and an identical twin, Mark who also moved to Chapel Hill in 1992 and joined Michael to pursue a career as musicians. Holland is married to Juliet (Dickey) Holland, a concert and event planning executive. Holland has a son, Jack from a previous marriage.

== Career ==
=== Jennanykind (1991–2012) ===
Michael Holland is a founding member of the rock band Jennyanykind that was primarily active in the 1990s alternative music scene. Jennyanykind was discovered by legendary A&R executive Terry Tolkin and signed to his own No. 6 Records. Jennyanykind released three recordings on No. 6 Records between 1993 - 1995:

- Etc... (1994)
  - Album art photography by Ami Vitale
- Blues of the Afflicted (EP)(1995)
- Mythic (1995)

In late 1995, Tolkin signed the band to Elektra Records. Revelater, recorded with producer Dave Fridmann was the band's only Elektra release.

In 1998, Jennyanykind signed with Yep Roc Records and released the self-produced Big Johns the same year. After a second release on Yep Roc, I Need You, recorded and released the following year, the band retired.

Jennyanykind reunited in 2003 and recorded Peas and Collards for MoRisen Records, and again in 2011 for a split single with The Moaners on the label Holidays for Quince. The song from that single, "Jam Up and Jelly Tight", also appeared in the film The World Made Straight.

=== Solo (2003–present) ===
As a solo artist, Holland has been active off and on since his initial album Bootlegger's Dreams, recorded in 1999 after Jennyanykind retired was released in 2003 on his own Big John's label. In 2002, he was a SXSW critics pick for his show at the original Antone's. During this time, Holland occasionally played with local bluegrass group Big Fat Gap Band, and eventually asked them to back him up on the recording sessions that would become what has been called a visionary album, Tomorrows American Treasures, released on Sit-n-Spin Records in 2005. Holland was also featured as an up-and-coming artist in American Way Magazine in 2006.

Tomorrows American Treasures caught the ear of German label Moll Tonträger owner Jan Szlovak, which resulted in a collection of songs that nodded towards traditional country music, Simple Truths and Pleasures in 2008. Holland continued exploring more American themes in the Szlovak-funded album Rhythm of Love, recorded with a cast of musicians named The Occoneechee String Band for the project.

In 2020, Holland released two Christmas-themed songs, "Those Christmas Lights", and "The Fatman Rocks", originally written for the film Fatman, with proceeds from sales being donated to St. Jude's Children's Research Hospital.

In June 2024, Holland served as a music consultant during production of the Max series The Righteous Gemstones: Season Four. On September 3rd, 2024 Holland released Wanted, a collection of electronic pop songs written and recorded from 2000-2024, with several written for specific artists or productions.

In September, 2026 Holland released Foundation For Tomorrow, a collection of twelve original folk songs.

=== The Holland Bros (2013–present) ===
Since 2013, Michael Holland has recorded and performed with twin brother and former Jennyanykind bandmate Mark Holland as The Holland Bros., a musical duo that focuses on a pre-war music mix of covers and originals that cover country and piedmont blues, jugband, folk, and country. In 2019, the Holland Bros. appeared in the HBO series The Righteous Gemstones (as uncredited bluegrass musicians in Season 1, Episode 3), and performed at the North Carolina State Fair.

In 2021, the brothers arranged and recorded a version of The Mermaid with Beth Ditto singing lead vocal for the AppleTV+ series Dickinson. The brothers appear uncredited with fiddle player Bobby Britt and bassist Billie Feather in Season 3 Episode 4 as the backing band for Ditto as she performs a portion of the recorded song during one of the episode's scenes. Later in the same episode, the band is heard and seen playing a version of Old Joe Clark produced by Michael and released under the name Occoneechee String Band.

The duo have released six recordings:

- Dueling Devils (2013)
- Yo! To The Holland Brothers (2015)
- The Mermaid (2021)
- Disco Throwdown/Wine & Cigarettes (2025), written and produced with Keaton Simons
- Bon Vivant Savants (2025)
- Rollin’ In The Green (2026), co-written and produced with Keaton Simons and Jack Holland.

In 2023, Holland recorded and mixed a Holland Brothers track, "Redeemer (Fiery Version)" for HBO's The Righteous Gemstones Season 3, Episode 7, which premiered July 23, 2023.

In 2025, Holland produced and played fiddle on The Bonnie Blue Flag for The Righteous Gemstones Season 4, Episode 1, featuring Bradley Cooper which premiered March 9, 2025. The Holland Brothers also co-produced other Old time fiddle tracks, including Billy in the Lowground and Hawks & Eagles in the same episode.

=== Production and other projects (1998–present) ===
From 2010 to 2011, Holland played bass for the indie pop band Fan Modine, which at the time was managed by former R.E.M. Manager Jefferson Holt. Holland's bass playing appears on one Fan Modine track, the Alex Chilton song, "The EMI Song (Smile For Me)".

In 2026, Holland co-wrote and co-produced the holiday song, "Memphis For Christmas" for Academy Award nominated actor Eric Roberts. He also co-wrote and produced a second holiday song in August: "Praise His Name on Christmas Day" for The White Palominos band.

== Discography ==
Jennanykind (1991 - 2011)
Title	Format	Label	Year	Notes
Windchimes/Long	7" vinyl	Self Released	1993	
Etc...	LP	No. 6	1994	
Blues of the Afflicted	EP	No. 6	1994	
Mythic	LP	No. 6	1995	
Revelater	LP	Elektra	1996	
Big Johns	LP	Yep Roc	1998	
I Need You	LP	Yep Roc	1999	
Peas and Collards	LP	MoRisen	2003	
Jam Up and Jelly Tight	7" Vinyl	Holidays for Quince	2011	Split single with The Moaners

Solo (2003–present)
Title	Format	Label	Year	Notes
Bootleggers Dreams	LP	Big Johns	2003	Recorded in 1999
Tomorrows American Treasures	LP	Sit-n-Spin	2005	#9 Bluegrass Chart, Roots Music Report 6/3/2005
Simple Truths and Pleasures	LP	Moll Tonträger	2008	
Lighten Up Angel	Single	UNC Press	2009	Southern Cultures Magazine Vol. 15, No. 3 Compilation - Cool Water Music
Rhythm of Love	LP	Euramerican Soul	2010	Michael Holland and the Occoneechee String Band
Fever For You	Single	Various	2019	Dickinson Season 1 Soundtrack (AppleTV+)
Those Christmas Lights/The Fatman Rocks	7" Vinyl	Euramerican Soul	2020	
Wanted	LP	Euramerican Soul	2024	
Foundation For Tomorrow	LP	Euramerican Soul	2026	

The Holland Brothers (2013–present)
Title	Format	Label	Year	Notes
Dueling Devils	LP	Euramerican Soul	2013	
Yo! To The Holland Brothers	LP	Euramerican Soul	2015	
The Mermaid	Single	Euramerican Soul	2021	
Redeemer(Fiery Version)	Season 3 Soundtrack	HBO: The Righteous Gemstones	2023	Rough House Pictures
Disco Throwdown	Single	Euramerican Soul	2025	Backing vocals
Wine & Cigarettes	Single	Euramerican Soul	2025	Lead vocals, guitar
Bon Vivant Savants	LP	Euramerican Soul	2025	
Rollin' In The Green	Single	Euramerican Soul	2026	Featuring Keaton Simons

As Producer/Musician (1991–present)
Title	Format	Artist	Year	Label	Notes
Wave To Make Friends	LP	Comas	1999	Plastique	
Big Fat Gap	LP	Big Fat Gap	2005		
The Pine and the Promise	2 tracks on LP	Rodeo Boy	2001		
The EMI Song (Smile For Me)	Single	Fan Modine	2011		Bass Guitar
Old Joe Clark	Single	Occoneechee String Band	2010		
Redeemer(Fiery Version)	Season 3 Soundtrack	HBO: The Righteous Gemstones	2023	Rough House Pictures	
Hawks and Eagles	Season 4 Episode 1	HBO: The Righteous Gemstones	2025		Producer/Consultant
Billy in the Lowground	Season 4 Episode 1	HBO: The Righteous Gemstones	2025		Producer/Consultant
Bonnie Blue Flag	Season 4 Episode 1	HBO: The Righteous Gemstones	2025		Producer/Fiddle
Memphis for Christmas	Single	Eric Roberts	2026	Euramerican Soul	Co-producer/Rhythm and Bass guitar; Backing vocals
Praise His Name On Christmas Day	Single	The White Palominos	2026	Euramerican Soul	Producer
