= Futurama (Supercar album) =

Studio album by Supercar
- Released: November 22, 2000
- Genres: Indie rock, shoegazing, synthpop, experimental rock
- Length: 75:16
- Label: Ki/oon Music
- Producer: Supercar

Supercar chronology
Jump Up (1999)	Futurama (2000)	Highvision (2002)

Singles from Futurama
- 1. "Fairway" Released: February 2, 2000; 2. "White Surf Style 5." Released: October 12, 2000

Futurama is the third album by the Japanese indie rock band Supercar. The album's name is a portmanteau of the words "future" and "panorama." Musically, its electronic experimentation marked a significant shift for a group whose music two years earlier had been characterized primarily as guitar rock.

Futurama was released on November 22, 2000, and it reached the 21st place on the Oricon Albums Chart.

== Track listing ==
No.	Title	Length
1.	"Changes"	4:09
2.	"Playstar Vista"	5:20
3.	"Baby Once More"	4:10
4.	"White Surf style 5."	5:18
5.	"Star Fall"	5:51
6.	"Flava"	4:13
7.	"Shibuya Morning"	4:35
8.	"Easy Way Out"	4:00
9.	"Everybody On News"	3:35
10.	"Karma"	5:44
11.	"Fairway"	4:14
12.	"ReStarter"	5:01
13.	"A.O.S.A."	4:57
14.	"New Young City"	4:54
15.	"Blue Subrhyme"	5:04
16.	"I'm Nothing"	4:18
