= Miki Furukawa =

Japanese musician (born 1979)

Miki Furukawa フルカワミキ
- Born: 19 February 1979 (age 47)
- Origin: Hachinohe, Aomori, Japan
- Genres: Rock, pop, electropop
- Years active: 1995–present
- Labels: BMG Japan (2006–2008); Ki/oon Records (2009–2014); Heartfast (2009, 2014–present)

Miki Furukawa (古川 美季, Furukawa Miki; professionally written as フルカワミキ) (born February 19, 1979) is a Japanese musician. From 1995 to 2005 she was the bass player and vocalist of the indie rock band Supercar. She released her first solo record in 2006.

== Biography ==
Originating from Aomori Prefecture, Miki Furukawa placed an advertisement in a local magazine seeking fellow musicians in 1995, leading to the formation of the rock band Supercar. Supercar, which released its influential debut album Three Out Change in 1998, has been characterized as having "almost foundational importance to 21st century Japanese indie rock". After a successful, ten-year career, Supercar disbanded in 2005 in order for the members to pursue different interests.

In 2006 Furukawa released her first solo album, Mirrors, featuring a mixture of guitar-based rock songs and electronic dance-pop. Bondage Heart (2008) pointed in a new direction, with heavy influences from post-punk, psychedelic rock and noise, whereas Very (2010) was a mostly electropop-oriented record. In December 2009, software developer AH Software used voice samples from Furukawa to create the Vocaloid voice library SF-A2 Miki. In 2011, Miki Furukawa and former Supercar bandmate Koji Nakamura formed the band called Lama. Lama jump-started their formation with a single entitled "Spell", which has been used as an opening theme for the anime No. 6. The single "Fantasy" was used as the ending theme for the anime Un-Go.

== Discography ==
=== Singles ===
- "Coffee & SingingGirl!!!" (June 21, 2006)
- "Psycho America" (March 21, 2007)
- "Candy Girl" (February 20, 2008)
- "Saihate" (December 2, 2009)

=== Albums ===
- Mirrors (July 19, 2006)
- Bondage Heart (April 23, 2008)
- Bondage Heart Remixes (May 13, 2009)
- Very (February 17, 2010)
- Moshi Moshi, Kikoemasuka? (April 2, 2014)
