= Un-Go =

2011 anime directed by Seiji Mizushima

- Title sequence logo of Un-Go. In the background are destroyed buildings from a post-war Tokyo.

アンゴ (Ango)
- Genre: Mystery, science fiction, supernatural action thriller
- Anime television series
- Directed by: Seiji Mizushima
- Produced by: Daisuke Konaka; Yoshihiro Oyabu; Yoshinori Takeeda
- Written by: Shō Aikawa
- Music by: NARASAKI
- Studio: Bones
- Licensed by: AUS: Siren Visual; NA: Sentai Filmworks; UK: Kazé UK
- Original network: Fuji TV (noitamina)
- Original run: October 13, 2011 – December 22, 2011
- Episodes: 11
- Anime film

Episode 0: Inga Chapter
- Directed by: Seiji Mizushima
- Produced by: Daisuke Konaka; Yoshihiro Oyabu
- Written by: Shō Aikawa
- Studio: Bones
- Licensed by: NA: Sentai Filmworks
- Released: November 19, 2011
- Runtime: 50 minutes

Un-Go (Japanese: アンゴ, Hepburn: Ango) is a 2011 anime television series produced by Bones which aired on Fuji TV's noitamina program block between October 13, 2011, and December 22, 2011. Based on the noted Japanese intellectual and novelist Ango Sakaguchi's novel Meiji Kaika Ango Torimono-chō (明治開化 安吾捕物帖), the series is directed by Seiji Mizushima and written by Shō Aikawa, who had earlier worked together on Fullmetal Alchemist. Featuring character designs from Pako and Yun Kōga, the music for the series is composed by NARASAKI, with the opening theme being "How to Go" by School Food Punishment and the ending theme being "Fantasy" by LAMA.

Un-Go was simulcast with English subtitles by Crunchyroll and Anime on Demand. A prequel film, Un-Go Episode 0: Inga Chapter (Japanese: アンゴ 因果論, Hepburn: Ango Inga-ron), ran in Japanese theatres for two weeks from November 19, 2011. Sentai Filmworks has licensed the series, along with episode 0, in North America, while Siren Visual has licensed the series in Australia and Kazé has licensed the series in the United Kingdom.

== Plot ==
Un-Go is set in a dystopian future Japan. After an unnamed war and multiple terrorist attacks finally reach the mainland, the Japanese government decides to revoke Article 9 of the Japanese Constitution and mobilizes their self-defense forces in retaliation. Some time later, the war-torn country eventually achieves a period of uneasy peace, and the Japanese government passes the "Information Privacy and Protection Act" in the name of stopping terrorism and further attacks against the country. The Act gives tech company executive Rinroku Kaishou control over a vast surveillance network that can acquire data through nearly any connected device in the country, which he supposedly uses to fight all sorts of crime.

The story of Un-Go revolves around an old-fashioned detective named Shinjūrō Yuki and his supernatural partner Inga. On the surface, Shinjūrō shows up to a crime scene at the wrong time and reaches the wrong conclusion, earning public mockery as "The Defeated Detective," in contrast to the heroic Rinroku. However, in truth, Shinjūrō is often called in by Rinroku or the Public Prosecutors Office when the subject of the case is too delicate for normal investigative procedure. With his deductive skills and Inga's special ability, Shinjūrō always digs deep to find the truth of the matter, even as Rinroku will spin his conclusion to fit a narrative that will comfort a public still recovering from the war.

=== Characters ===
The main cast of Un-Go, from episode 1. From left: Seigen Hayami, Izumi Koyama, Inga (child form), Shinjuurou Yuuki, Inga (adult form), Rinroku Kaishou and Rie Kaishou.

Shinjuurou Yuuki (結城 新十郎, Yūki Shinjūrō)
Voiced by: Ryo Katsuji (Japanese); Adam Gibbs (English)
A detective, often nicknamed "The Defeated Detective", and Inga's contractor. He has keen insight on mysteries - in particular, cases of murder. Prior to the start of the series, Shinjuurou was near death when his blood revived Inga, who in turn revived him from the brink of death. After the following incident, he made a deal with Inga: as long as Inga does not kill any more people, Shinjuurou will give her souls to eat. His personality is based on the works of Ango Sakaguchi. In the prequel movie, Kaishou Rinroku gives him his current identity, given that his original identity was lost during the chaos in Tokyo.
Inga (因果)
Voiced by: Aki Toyosaki (Japanese); Emily Neves (English)
An Akuma, and Shinjuurou's partner and "boss". While usually seen in the form of a young boy, Inga occasionally transforms into a mature woman in order to devour souls. According to Shinjuuro, she can ask a person any single question, and the person "will have no choice but to answer with the truth". She does this instead of killing her victims, as a result of a deal she made with Shinjuurou in exchange for souls. Inga inhabits the body of Yuuko, a woman from Shinjuurou's past who killed herself to make sure no one could see into her soul, saving him in the process.
Rinroku Kaishou (海勝 麟六, Kaishō Rinroku)
Voiced by: Shinichiro Miki (Japanese); Justin Doran (English)
The director of the company J.J. Systems, Rinroku also acts as an adviser to Koyama in solving cases. He often monitors crime scenes from the comfort of his home, through an expert computer set-up.
Rie Kaishou (海勝 梨江, Kaishō Rie)
Voiced by: Nozomi Yamamoto (Japanese); Kris Carr (English)
Rinroku's daughter, who is often quite stubborn. She shows an interest in Shinjuurou and Inga after they solve a murder case at a private party. She dislikes the fact that her father, Rinroku, tends to cover up conspiracies instead of giving the public the truth.
Izumi Koyama (虎山 泉, Koyama Izumi)
Voiced by: Takako Honda (Japanese); Elizabeth Bunch (English)
A public prosecutor with a no-nonsense personality, Koyama often calls on Rinroku for help in solving cases. She does not think fondly of Shinjuurou, and even less of Inga.
Kazamori Sasa (佐々 風守, Sasa Kazamori)
Voiced by: Marika Matsumoto (Japanese); Hilary Haag (English)
A Real Artificial Intelligence program (R.A.I.) that can exist in various compatible systems. After being involved in a murder case, she is taken in by Shinjuurou and Inga. She often inhabits one of two bodies: the main robot body in the shape of a human girl, or a small stuffed panda toy.
Seigen Hayami (速水 星玄, Hayami Seigen)
Voiced by: Miyu Irino (Japanese); Ross Bautsch (English)
Director of the Security Bureau, and part of the Metropolitan Police Department.

== Episodes ==
| No. | Title | Original release date |
|---|---|---|
| 0 | "Inga Chapter" "Inga-ron" (因果論) | November 19, 2011 |
The story about Shinjuurou and Inga's first encounter.
| 1 | "Murder at the Ball" "Butōkai no Satsujin" (舞踏会の殺人) | October 13, 2011 |
Kaoru Kanou, a corporate president who is under suspicion for arrest, holds a ballroom event. Among the invitees are detective Shinjuurou Yuuki; his strange partner, Inga; and Rie, the daughter of JJ Systems Chairman Rinroku Kaishou. During the event, Kanou walks onto the podium to profess his innocence, and falls dead just as he walks into the spotlight. Koyama finds that Kanou was murdered by a knife in his back. Kanou's wife blames the government for killing him, blaming a female SP officer, who was found shot dead in an elevator, for the assassination. However, Shinjuurou debunks this, questioning why the SP officer had her jacket next to her and a bullet in her chest. After deducing that Kanou's wife was the killer, Inga asks her, "What was your husband to you?" Compelled to answer, Kanou's wife states that Kanou was a hero for supporting Japan during the war. Not wanting to let the government arrest him, Kanou's wife killed the SP officer, impersonated her, and killed Kanou to ensure that he would die as a hero.
| 2 | "Pitiless Song" "Mujō no Uta" (無情のうた) | October 20, 2011 |
A wealthy woman named Hisako Osada is found murdered in a briefcase that was delivered to her home. While the police suspect Hisako's lover to be the culprit, her daughter, An, believes someone else is behind the murder and calls on Shinjuurou to investigate. Their investigation leads them to look into an idol group Hisako managed named Yonagahime 3+1, one of its members of which, Eri, was allegedly killed in a terrorist attack. Inga uses her powers on one of Yonagahime's members, who reveals that Eri never existed and was just used by Hisako to skyrocket the band's popularity during the war. After analyzing Eri's vocal data, Shinjuurou deduces the culprit to be An, who wasn't allowed to publicly sing due to her vocal data being used for Eri.
| 3 | "Masked Mansion" "Fukumen Yashiki" (覆面屋敷) | October 27, 2011 |
Rie calls on Shinjuurou and Inga to accept a request from Mitsuko Sasa, whose adopted brother Kazamori caught on fire and died, allegedly related to a curse from her father, Komamori, who died in a similar manner seven years ago. As Izumi's group conducts their own investigations on the cause of Kazamori's death, Inga uses her powers to reveal that Kazamori not human. Shinjuurou prompts Kazamori to show "himself", revealing that "he" is actually a computer program.
| 4 | "House, Unmasked" "Sugao no Ie" (素顔の家) | November 3, 2011 |
Kazamori is revealed to be an R.A.I., one of the last created by Komamori before they were outlawed. As Kazamori is accused of killing the corpse that was assumed to be him, Shinjuurou and Inga download Kazamori into a panda toy before he is taken into custody. After discovering that the corpse was Dr. Taku, and that the Dr. Taku who was injured was a robot puppet, Shinjuurou and others soon discover the culprit is Komamori. He'd faked his death using the body of the real Dr. Taku so that his R.A.I. wouldn't be used by the JSDF. After Komamori is arrested by Izumi, Kazamori moves her consciousness to her main body.
| 5 | "The Phantom Statue" "Maboroshi no Zō" (幻の像) | November 10, 2011 |
At the unveiling of a statue created in memory of three youths who sacrificed themselves to dispose of a bomb in a press conference, two people who were snuck in to try and unveil a purported scam behind the story are found murdered inside the statue. Shinjuurou initially suspects the statue's commissioner, Hakuro Shimada, as the murderer, but Inga's question proves his innocence. After a brief depression and a pep talk from Kazamori, Shinjuurou deduces the culprit to be the statue's creator, Youko, who killed the men before they were transported, before later revealing the location of gold bricks that Hakuro had hidden.
| 6 | "The Code Too Simple" "Amari ni mo Kantan na Angō" (あまりにも簡単な暗号) | November 17, 2011 |
Shinjuurou is approached by Yajima, an old friend of Rinroku, who found a piece of manuscript in a book given to him by an inmate while he was in prison. After discovering Yajima's wife Takiko's fingerprints on the paper, Shinjuurou informs Rie, who investigates how the book relates to Rinroku. Shinjuurou later hears from Yajima about how his children disappeared and his wife went blind, allegedly having an affair with Rinroku. Shinjuurou looks at all the books Rinroku bought from the Yajima family, finding more hidden codes which are revealed to be from Yajima's children. As it turns out, Rinroku had helped the children and placed them in child care to avoid Takiko's neglect, and they are soon reunited with Yajima. Afterward, Shinjuurou confronts the prisoner who gave Yajima the book, learning something shocking.
| 7 | "Daydream" "Hakuchiyuumu" (ハクチユウム) | November 24, 2011 |
As the prisoner explains how he is 'a novelist who writes in reality', a strange being accompanying him traps Shinjuurou in a vision where he is a cameraman shooting a film about a war that never happened. As Shinjuurou becomes curious about whether the director is involved with one of the actresses, he gets the nagging feeling that there's a mystery to be solved. As Shinjuurou loses grip on this reality, he discovers the director has been killed and believes himself to be the culprit.
| 8 | "The King of Paradise" "Rakuen no Ō" (楽園の王) | December 1, 2011 |
After determining that Shinjuurou had been imprisoned, Rie accompanies Izumi to the prison, where they are both put under the novelist's spell and become characters in his 'novel' alongside Shinjuurou. As Inga determines this is the work of a deity known as Bettenou, Kazamori manages to make use of a pair of taser handcuffs to snap Shinjuurou back to reality. Shinjuurou investigates into the real murder, determining the culprit to be one of the 'actresses', who killed the 'director', who was actually a security guard trying to help her escape, because she believed she was being cut from the movie. Meanwhile, Inga gets the truth out of the novelist while Bettenou disappears.
| 9 | "Rinroku Kaishou's Crime" "Kaishō Rinroku no Hanzai" (海勝麟六の犯罪) | December 8, 2011 |
As Shinjuurou wonders where Bettenou has disappeared to, a hacking group known as Full Circle is spreading leaks of Rinroku's company and lifestyle. As Rinroku makes an appearance on television show along with various people from rival companies, an explosion occurs when he exits the room, hospitalizing everyone including Rinroku, while another Rinroku appears at Rie's house. As Rie asks Shinjuurou to prove Rinroku's innocence the next day, Inga comes face to face with Bettenou. After Shinjuurou hears about the second Rinroku from Rie, he deduces that this is the work of Bettenou and believes Rinroku to be the one using her. He gets help from a rookie Diet member to have the hospitalized Rinroku provide a testimony on the leaks.
| 10 | "Rinroku Kaisho's Funeral" "Kaishō Rinroku no Sōsō" (海勝麟六の葬送) | December 15, 2011 |
As Rinroku is interviewed via a live video feed, Shinjuurou has Rie tell everyone about the Rinroku that appeared in her home at the time of the explosion. To Shinjuurou's surprise, Inga is called in as a witness to question Izumi, forcing her to reveal secrets about Rinroku's involvement in illegal software used prior to the war. As the hospitalized Rinroku is discharged, he is killed in a car explosion. After speaking with Rie, Shinjuurou suspects something is amiss and manages to learn more about Bettenou from the novelist, further founding his theory that Rinroku used Bettenou's power to fake his death.
| 11 | "I'm Just Searching" "Watashi wa Tada Sagashiteiru" (私はただ探している) | December 22, 2011 |
Shinjuurou, along with Rie, Izumi and some others, receive strange invitations supposedly sent by Rinroku. They are brought together at a table where they are presented with weapons, Shinjuurou believes that the imposter Rinroku was the one who appeared at Rie's home, deducing that the Diet member and Rinroku's bodyguard caused the explosion. It is at this point that Rinroku himself seemingly appears with Inga, only for Shinjuurou to deduce that he is actually Izumi's assistant, Hayami Seigen, using Bettenou's power, with the real Rinroku having disguised himself amongst the attendees, having previously faked his death. After a fierce battle, Inga defeats Bettenou and devours her. After the incident, Shinjuurou begins telling his story to Rie, including the origin of Inga's current body.
