= George Salisbury (director) =

George E. Salisbury (born October 4, 1971) is a film and music video director and graphic designer based in Oklahoma City, Oklahoma.

== Career ==
George Salisbury is best known for his work as the principal art director and music video director with the American rock band The Flaming Lips.

Salisbury has also worked with The Starlight Mints, Stardeath and White Dwarfs, and BMX biking biker Matt Hoffman.

== The Flaming Lips (1994–present) ==
Both Salisbury and Wayne Coyne, lead singer of the Flaming Lips, are responsible for a distinct visual style that is the band's trademark for both their live shows and the album cover designs and packaging. One of Salisbury's earliest contributions to the Flaming Lips' live shows, is the "Flames of Destiny" flaming cymbal. Salisbury orchestrated and executed the feat by filling an inverted cymbal on a stand with alcohol and then lighting it on fire while the band played in the background.

His eye is featured along with the tongue of J. Michelle Martin-Coyne on the cover of Yeah, I Know It's a Drag... But Wastin' Pigs Is Still Radical EP in 1991.

Salisbury, along with Wayne Coyne and Bradley Beesley, co-directed Christmas on Mars a full-length feature film released in 2008.

== Works ==
=== Films ===
- Blastula: Making of Embryonic (2009, 21 min)
- The Making of The Flaming Lips and Stardeath and White Dwarfs with Henry Rollins and Peaches Doing The Dark Side of the Moon (2009)
- Christmas on Mars (2008, 83 min)
- UFOs at the Zoo (The Flaming Lips) (2007)
- Live at the Hollywood Bowl (The Flaming Lips) (2006)
- All Tomorrow’s Parties 3D Series #01-20 (The Flaming Lips) (2009)
- March of 1000 Flaming Skeletons Promo (The Flaming Lips) (2009, 5 min)
- The Flaming Lips: March of 1000 Flaming Skeletons - Interviews (2009, 4 min)
- The Flaming Lips: Zaireeka 10th Anniversary Virtual Wayne (2007)

=== Music videos ===
- "I'm Working at NASA on Acid" - The Flaming Lips
- "Do You Realize (Live at the Hollywood Cemetery)" - The Flaming Lips with Edward Sharpe and the Magnetic Zeros
- "See the Leaves" - The Flaming Lips
- "The Sparrow Looks up at the Machine" - The Flaming Lips
- "Powerless" - The Flaming Lips
- "Watching the Planets" - The Flaming Lips
- "I Can Be a Frog" - The Flaming Lips
- "Borderline" - Flaming Lips and Stardeath and White Dwarfs
- "Convinced Of The Hex (Live)" - The Flaming Lips
- "Silver Trembling Hands (Live)" - The Flaming Lips
- "Power Bleed" - The Starlight Mints
- "New Heat" - Stardeath and White Dwarfs
- "Age of the Freak" - Stardeath and White Dwarfs
- "Bohemian Rhapsody" - The Flaming Lips
- "The Yeah Yeah Yeah Song (With All Your Power) Wayne’s Big Mouth Version" - The Flaming Lips
- "On the Lips" - JD McPherson
- "The W.A.N.D (Cosmic Dancer Version)" - The Flaming Lips (Co-director/Editor)
- "The W.A.N.D. (Slow Motion Reversed Version)" – The Flaming Lips (Editor )
- "Are You A Hypnotist??" – The Flaming Lips
- "Mr. Ambulance Driver" - The Flaming Lips (Editor)
- "Do You Realize?? Version 1" - The Flaming Lips (Editor)
- "Yoshimi Battles the Pink Robots, Pt. 1" - The Flaming Lips (Editor)
- "Fight Test" - The Flaming Lips (Editor)
- "Race for the Prize" - The Flaming Lips (Editor)
- "That Old Black Hole" - Dr. Dog

=== Packaging design ===
- "Heady Nuggs" - The Flaming Lips
- "Embryonic" - The Flaming Lips
- "The Birth" - Stardeath and White Dwarfs
- "Christmas on Mars" - The Flaming Lips
- "At War with the Mystics" - The Flaming Lips
- "Fearless Freaks" - dir. Bradley Beesley
- "VOID (Video Overview in Deceleration)" - The Flaming Lips
- "Yoshimi Battles the Pink Robots" - The Flaming Lips
- "The Soft Bulletin" - The Flaming Lips
- "Zaireeka" - The Flaming Lips
- "The Terror" - The Flaming Lips
