= Strobo Trip =

Strobo Trip - Light & Audio Phase Illusions Toy

EP by The Flaming Lips
- Released: September 20, 2011
- Recorded: August–September 2011
- Genre: Experimental rock, psychedelic rock
- Length: 370:35
- Label: Warner Bros.
- Producer: The Flaming Lips, Dave Fridmann

Flaming Lips EP chronology
The Flaming Lips with Lightning Bolt (2011)	Strobo Trip - Light & Audio Phase Illusions Toy (2011)	7 Skies H3 (2011)

Strobo Trip - Light & Audio Phase Illusions Toy is a toy box containing a stroboscope light and a memory stick with three tracks of music composed by the band The Flaming Lips.

After the announcement in early May, it was released on September 20, 2011, at 5 pm, and is known for the 6-hour long track "I Found a Star on the Ground." The Strobo Trip is exactly 6 hours, 10 minutes, and 35 seconds long.

== Information ==
The Strobo Trip toy combines a pulsating strobe light and 24 disks designed by David Bizzaro, Michelle Martin-Coyne, George Salisbury, Daniel Huffman and Dylan Bradaway. The toy creates a stroboscopic effect (similar to a Phenakistoscope) when components are rotating. Most of the discs have geometric psychedelic illustrations, but one of them has drawings of spermatozoa fertilizing ova.

The first track, "Butterfly, How Long It Takes to Die" appeared with a different mix in the 2013 Flaming Lips album The Terror.

"I Found a Star on the Ground" is a 6-hour long song recorded over a period of 3 weeks from August 23 to September 17, 2011. Fans who donated $100 to two causes selected by The Flaming Lips (the Central Oklahoma Humane Society and the Academy of Contemporary Music at the University of Central Oklahoma) got their name in an indeterminate place in the lyrics to "I Found a Star on the Ground." The names of more than 200 donors were recited on the track by Sean Lennon.

The box-set was available for purchase only at Jackpot Records (203 SW 9th Ave. Portland OR 97205) on September 20, where Wayne Coyne himself sold 11 boxes to fans. The boxes were available later at other Oklahoma shops, and finally at a later Flaming Lips show. The boxes were sold for $60 to $85.

A website was launched in September 2015 to stream "I Found a Star on the Ground," but it has yet to be officially released in any other format.

On Monday, October 14, 2019, Google paid tribute to the optical phenomena demonstrated in the Strobo Trip Toy via the Google homepage Doodle, which credited Joseph Plateau as one of two simultaneous inventors of the phenakistiscope (Simon Stampfer was the other) .

== Track listing ==
No.	Title	Length
1.	"Butterfly, How Long It Takes to Die"	6:37
2.	"I Found a Star on the Ground"	360:00
3.	"Evil Minds"	3:59
Total length:		370:35

== Personnel ==
- Wayne Coyne
- Michael Ivins
- Steven Drozd
- Kliph Scurlock
- Derek Brown
