= Heady Nuggs =

Heady Nuggs: The First 5 Warner Bros Records 1992–2002

Compilation album by The Flaming Lips
- Released: April 16, 2011
- Recorded: 1992–2002
- Genre: Alternative rock

The Flaming Lips compilation chronology
Once Beyond Hopelessness (2008)	Heady Nuggs: The First 5 Warner Bros Records 1992–2002 (2011)

Heady Nuggs: The First 5 Warner Bros Records 1992–2002 is a box set by Oklahoma-based band The Flaming Lips, containing vinyl reissues of the five albums that span the band's first decade on Warner Bros. Records. These five albums are Hit to Death in the Future Head, Transmissions from the Satellite Heart, Clouds Taste Metallic, The Soft Bulletin, and Yoshimi Battles the Pink Robots.
Not included is 1997's Zaireeka, which was later released in a four disk box set on Record Store Day in 2013.

The box set was released on April 16, 2011 to coincide with the third annual Record Store Day, and is limited to 6,500 copies on black vinyl. A special edition version, pressed on colored vinyl and limited to 1,000 copies, was sold on the band's website. On the interior of the packaging is an Easter Egg featuring lyrics from the song "Moth in the Incubator" off the album Transmissions from the Satellite Heart.

On December 18, 2015 another box set using the Heady Nuggs title was released by The Flaming Lips, entitled Heady Nuggs: 20 Years After Clouds Taste Metallic 1994-1997. It comprised the 1994 EP Due to High Expectations... The Flaming Lips Are Providing Needles for Your Balloons, the 1995 album Clouds Taste Metallic and two unreleased discs - a rarities compilation called The King Bug Laughs and an unreleased live show titled Psychiatric Exploration Of The Fetus With Needles (Live In Seattle 1996). This set was released either as a five LP box set or three CD set.

Exclusively in the US, on Record Store Day 2016, a second vinyl box set containing the next five Warner Brothers albums on vinyl was released, spanning the years 2006-2012, including At War With The Mystics, Once Beyond Hopelessness, Embryonic, Dark Side of the Moon and The Flaming Lips and Heady Fwends.
