= She Don't Use Jelly =

1993 single by the Flaming Lips

Single by the Flaming Lips

from the album Transmissions from the Satellite Heart
- B-side: "Translucent Egg"; "Turn It On" (bluegrass version); "★★★★★★★ (Plastic Jesus)" (porch version)
- Released: October 1993
- Length: 3:40
- Label: Warner Bros.
- Songwriters: Ronald Jones; Wayne Coyne; Michael Ivins; Steven Drozd
- Producers: The Flaming Lips; Keith Cleversley

The Flaming Lips singles chronology
"Wastin' Pigs EP" (1991)	"She Don't Use Jelly" (1993)	"Turn It On" (1995)

Music video
- "She Don't Use Jelly" on YouTube

"She Don't Use Jelly" is a song by American rock band the Flaming Lips from their sixth studio album, Transmissions from the Satellite Heart (1993). It reached number 55 on the US Billboard Hot 100 and became a top-30 hit in Australia.

== Music and lyrics ==
Discussing the song, the band's website states, "With its chiming pedal steel chorus breaks and seemingly nonsensical lyrics, the song entered into the realms of novelty hit. It's a happy little ditty about strange people and their individual idiosyncrasies, with pretty melodies laced throughout and punctuated by trademark moments of crunching but still harmonious noise."

The song describes a woman who "thinks of ghosts" and puts Vaseline on toast, a man who "goes to shows" and uses magazines to blow his nose, and another woman that "reminds [the narrator] of Cher" and uses tangerines to make her hair orange. Coyne has stated, "The song came to me very quickly, and I thought it was sort of funny."

== Track listings ==
US CD single

1. "She Don't Use Jelly" – 3:41
2. "Translucent Egg" – 3:45
3. "Turn It On" (bluegrass version) – 6:12
4. "★★★★★★★ (Plastic Jesus)" (porch version) – 1:42

US cassette single and UK 7-inch single

1. "She Don't Use Jelly" – 3:40
2. "Turn It On" (bluegrass version) – 6:12

UK CD1 and Australian CD single

1. "She Don't Use Jelly" – 3:40
2. "Translucent Egg" – 3:45
3. "Turn It On" (bluegrass version) – 6:12

UK CD2

1. "She Don't Use Jelly" – 3:40
2. "The Process" (live in Austin, Texas, August 1993) – 6:02
3. "Moth in the Incubator" (live in Austin, Texas, August 1993) – 4:12

== Charts ==
Chart (1994–1995)	Peak position
Australia (ARIA)	25
UK Singles (OCC)	94
US Billboard Hot 100	55
US Alternative Airplay (Billboard)	9
US Cash Box Top 100	53

== Release history ==
Region	Date	Format(s)	Label(s)	Ref.
United States	October 1993	CD	Warner Bros.	
United Kingdom	August 23, 1994	7-inch vinyl; CD; cassette	Warner Bros.	
Australia	February 13, 1995	CD	Warner Bros.	
