= American Head =

Studio album by the Flaming Lips
- Released: September 11, 2020
- Recorded: December 2019 – January 2020
- Studios: Tarbox Road Studios (Cassadaga, New York); Pink Floor Studios (Oklahoma City, Oklahoma)
- Genre: Psychedelic rock
- Length: 50:35
- Labels: Warner (US); Bella Union (UK)
- Producers: The Flaming Lips; Dave Fridmann; Scott Booker

The Flaming Lips chronology
King's Mouth (2019)	American Head (2020)	Where the Viaduct Looms (2021)

Singles from American Head
- 1. "Flowers of Neptune 6" Released: May 29, 2020; 2. "My Religion Is You" Released: June 26, 2020; 3. "Dinosaurs on the Mountain" Released: July 10, 2020; 4. "You n Me Sellin' Weed" Released: July 24, 2020; 5. "Will You Return / When You Come Down" Released: August 14, 2020; 6. "Mother Please Don't Be Sad" Released: August 28, 2020

American Head is the sixteenth studio album by American rock band the Flaming Lips, released on September 11, 2020, on Warner Records in the US and Bella Union in the UK. Produced by Dave Fridmann and Scott Booker, alongside the band itself, the album represents a return to the band's American roots. It is the final studio album to feature founding bass guitarist Michael Ivins as well as longtime multi-instrumentalist member Steven Drozd, who left the group in 2021 and 2025 respectively. It also includes keyboardist Jake Ingalls and drummer Nicholas Ley's last credited performances with the group before departing.

It received critical acclaim upon release. Its release was preceded by six singles: "Flowers of Neptune 6", "My Religion Is You", "Dinosaurs on the Mountain", "You n Me Sellin' Weed", "Will You Return / When You Come Down" and "Mother Please Don't Be Sad".

== Background ==
On March 23, 2020, Drozd announced that the band's sixteenth studio album, titled American Head, was due for release that summer. The album represents a shift in identity as the band decided to focus on their American roots on the album. Many of the songs reference Wayne Coyne's turbulent upbringing with his brothers in Oklahoma City. The band officially announced the album's release date as September 11, 2020, along with the single "My Religion Is You" on June 26, 2020. Coyne gave a track-by-track breakdown of the album for Apple Music. The album artwork contains a photograph of Coyne's older brother Tommy, taken around 1970.

== Critical reception ==
Professional ratings
Aggregate scores
Source	Rating
AnyDecentMusic?	7.5/10
Metacritic	80/100
Review scores
Source	Rating
AllMusic	4/5 stars
Consequence of Sound	A−
The Independent	4/5 stars
Mojo	4/5 stars
NME	4/5 stars
The Observer	2/5 stars
Paste	5.8/10
Pitchfork	7.7/10
The Times	5/5 stars
Uncut	9/10

American Head received widespread acclaim from critics. At Metacritic, which assigns a normalized score out of 100 to ratings from professional publications, it received a weighted mean score of 80 based on 23 reviews, indicating "generally favorable reviews". Tyler Clark of Consequence of Sound gave the album an A− rating, writing, "American Head stands alongside The Soft Bulletin and Yoshimi Battles the Pink Robots as one of the very best records the Flaming Lips have recorded". Tom Pinnock of Uncut gave the album a 9 out of 10 rating, praising the band for "examining the nature of family, love, death and nostalgia with a sincerity and tenderness that's been missed". Jude Rogers of Mojo praised the tracks "Mother I've Taken LSD", "Mother Please Don't Be Sad", and "Brother Eye", writing, "They suggest a place for the band's psychedelic imagination in more present, physical realms, which feels new." Pitchfork gave the album a 7.7 rating with the summary, "At the top of their fifth decade, the Lips rekindle their past romance with Neil Young's piano ballads, the Beatles' psychedelic guitar tones, and Bowie's stargazing anthems on a deeply personal album."

=== Year-end lists ===
Year-end list accolades for American Head
Publication	List	Rank	Ref.
Consequence of Sound	Top 50 Albums of 2020	47	
Mojo	The 75 Best Albums of 2020	10	
Spin	The 30 Best Albums of 2020	21	
Uncut	The Top 75 Albums of the Year	32	
Under the Radar	Top 100 Albums of 2020	47	

== Track listing ==
All tracks are written by the Flaming Lips

American Head track listing
No.	Title	Length
1.	"Will You Return / When You Come Down"	5:20
2.	"Watching the Lightbugs Glow"	2:53
3.	"Flowers of Neptune 6"	4:30
4.	"Dinosaurs on the Mountain"	3:38
5.	"At the Movies on Quaaludes"	3:41
6.	"Mother I've Taken LSD"	3:47
7.	"Brother Eye"	4:23
8.	"You n Me Sellin' Weed"	4:56
9.	"Mother Please Don't Be Sad"	3:35
10.	"When We Die When We're High"	3:39
11.	"Assassins of Youth"	4:12
12.	"God and the Policeman" (featuring Kacey Musgraves)	2:28
13.	"My Religion Is You"	3:33
Total length:		50:35

== Personnel ==
Credits adapted from the album's liner notes.

=== Performance ===
The Flaming Lips

- Wayne Coyne
- Steven Drozd
- Michael Ivins
- Derek Brown
- Jake Ingalls
- Matt Kirksey
- Nicholas Ley

Other musicians

- Kacey Musgraves – additional vocals (2, 3, 12)
- Micah Nelson – additional vocals (1), additional guitar (1)

=== Technical ===
- The Flaming Lips – production, recording, mixing
- Dave Fridmann – production, recording, mixing, mastering
- Scott Booker – production
- Dennis Coyne – recording, mixing, additional production
- Mike Fridmann – additional production

=== Design ===
- Kenny Coyne – photography
- George Salisbury – layout, design
- Wayne Coyne – layout, design

== Charts ==
Chart performance for American Head
Chart (2020)	Peak position
Austrian Albums (Ö3 Austria)	41
Belgian Albums (Ultratop Flanders)	17
Belgian Albums (Ultratop Wallonia)	78
Dutch Albums (Album Top 100)	64
German Albums (Offizielle Top 100)	16
Scottish Albums (Official Charts)	5
Swiss Albums (Schweizer Hitparade)	28
UK Albums (Official Charts)	17
US Billboard 200	172
US Top Rock Albums (Billboard)	25
