= King's Mouth =

Studio album by The Flaming Lips
- Released: April 13, 2019
- Genres: Neo-psychedelia; psychedelic rock
- Length: 41:10
- Labels: Warner Bros.; Bella Union
- Producers: The Flaming Lips; Dennis Coyne; Scott Booker

The Flaming Lips chronology
Oczy Mlody (2017)	King's Mouth (2019)	American Head (2020)

King's Mouth: Music and Songs is the fifteenth studio album by American rock band The Flaming Lips. It was released on Record Store Day on April 13, 2019 as a limited run of 4,000 gold-coloured records for the event. An official commercial version was released on July 19, 2019.

King's Mouth is a concept album that was conceived as the soundtrack to an art exhibit of the same name by frontman Wayne Coyne, which opened in 2017. The album features Mick Jones of The Clash providing narration on several tracks.

The concept of the album follows the storyline of a royal baby who is born to a mother that perishes during labor due to the baby's brain being too big. His brain is used to save a city from an avalanche, devouring the whole universe with his teeth. He dies in the process, and his followers chop off his head to live inside it for eternity.

== Critical reception ==
Professional ratings
Aggregate scores
Source	Rating
AnyDecentMusic?	6.8/10
Metacritic	74/100
Review scores
Source	Rating
AllMusic	3.5/5 stars
Exclaim!	7/10
Consequence of Sound	B−
The Guardian	4/5 stars
Mojo	4/5 stars
NME	4/5 stars
Pitchfork	7.0/10
PopMatters	8/10
Rolling Stone	2.5/5 stars
Slant Magazine	3/5 stars

On Metacritic, King's Mouth received a score of 74 out of 100 based on 25 reviews, indicating "generally favorable" reception. In a review for AllMusic, Heather Phares stated that the album "boasts enough beautiful music and striking imagery to make it well worth hearing". Writing for NME, Mark Beaumont called the album the band's most "playful, cinematic and cohesive" album since 2002's Yoshimi Battles the Pink Robots. Chris Ingalls of PopMatters rated the album 8 out of 10 stars and described it as a "strange, compelling head trip of an album". Reviewing the album for Consequence of Sound, David Sackllah characterized King's Mouth as a "return to form" for the band. Jeremy Winograd of Slant Magazine said the album was a "partial return to form" for the band, calling it an album of "heartwarming melodies set to hit-and-miss lyrics".

== Track listing ==
No.	Title	Length
1.	"We Don't Know How and We Don't Know Why"	1:10
2.	"The Sparrow"	5:38
3.	"Giant Baby"	3:50
4.	"Mother Universe"	1:51
5.	"How Many Times"	3:22
6.	"Electric Fire"	4:26
7.	"All for the Life of the City"	4:38
8.	"Feedaloodum Beedle Dot"	2:50
9.	"Funeral Parade"	2:58
10.	"Dipped in Steel"	1:31
11.	"Mouth of the King"	4:47
12.	"How Can a Head"	4:09
Total length:		41:10

== Charts ==
Chart (2019)	Peak position
Belgian Albums (Ultratop Flanders)	174
Scottish Albums (Official Charts)	22
UK Albums (Official Charts)	78
