= The Terror (album) =

Studio album by the Flaming Lips
- Released: April 1, 2013
- Recorded: February–April 2012
- Studio: Tarbox Road Studios (Cassadaga, New York); Pink Floor Studios (Oklahoma City, Oklahoma)
- Genre: Experimental rock; neo-psychedelia; electronic; dark ambient; electronic rock
- Length: 54:53
- Label: Warner Bros. (US); Bella Union (UK)
- Producer: The Flaming Lips; Dave Fridmann; Scott Booker

The Flaming Lips chronology
The Flaming Lips and Heady Fwends (2012)	The Terror (2013)	The Time Has Come to Shoot You Down... What a Sound (2013)

Singles from The Terror
- 1. "Sun Blows Up Today" Released: January 25, 2013; 2. "Look... The Sun Is Rising" Released: March 3, 2013

The Terror is the thirteenth studio album by American rock band the Flaming Lips, released on April 1, 2013 worldwide and April 16 in the U.S., on Warner Bros in the United States and Bella Union in the United Kingdom. It is the first album for band member Derek Brown who joined the band in 2009 for touring in support of Embryonic and last with drummer Kliph Scurlock.

Experimental composer Dan Deacon remixed the album in its entirety.

== Production ==
Lead vocalist Wayne Coyne described the album's general idea in a press release, "We want, or wanted, to believe that without love we would disappear, that love, somehow, would save us that, yeah, if we have love, give love and know love, we are truly alive and if there is no love, there would be no life. The Terror is, we know now, that even without love, life goes on... we just go on… there is no mercy killing."

Much of the album was shaped by multi-instrumentalist Steven Drozd's relapse, with Coyne saying of his relapse: "During the Heady Fwends collaborations, we knew he was struggling. I just knew it. But this time, he went and just said, 'I’m going to make this music and hope I get through it.' It was not to make a record. I’m doing so much stuff in Studio A [at Dave Fridmann’s Tarbox Studios]. And Steven would hole up in Studio B: 'Well, I’m going to do music over here because I’m going insane.'" Later in that same interview, he says "The lesson that we learned — and we learned this and then forgot it at least 20 fucking times since 1983 when we started making records — anytime that you veer away from the thing that you love, the thing that’s like masturbating, the thing that’s like sitting in the corner drooling on yourself, anytime you drift away from that, it really becomes a different kind of art. It becomes about fixing things, arranging things, trying to manipulate things for effect. We like to do that and I think oftentimes we’re good at that, but it’s not nearly as satisfying as the other type of art."

When asked about the optimism of the album and the band's work in general, Coyne says "I don’t really believe anyone who walks home and says, “Everything’s okay.” The reason we’re optimistic is that a lot of things aren’t great and we have to find a way to get through it… I don’t want someone to listen and only hear that I’m just some scared old man. Well… I am, but I don’t always sing about that. It is focusing on a particular dimension in our minds that this music on The Terror goes towards, which is darker. But at the end, it makes that optimism even more believable. We were in Australia in January and I swam in the ocean for only the second time in my life. You know you’re going to get in there and it’s going to be kind of cold and these waves are big. There’s a time where you’ve got to go from being very dry and very warm to being very wet and very cold. But if you get through that, it’s a fucking blast and you really feel this braveness. You’re in the waves and fighting against the waves. So I think now we’re kind of like that: “Fuck you, bring it on, motherfuckers.” It’s huge and immense, but we’re not so vulnerable. It’s better to be scared and do it than to be scared and not do it.

== Reception ==
Professional ratings
Aggregate scores
Source	Rating
AnyDecentMusic?	7.8/10
Metacritic	77/100
Review scores
Source	Rating
AllMusic	4/5 stars
The A.V. Club	A−
Chicago Tribune	2/4 stars
Entertainment Weekly	C
The Guardian	4/5 stars
The Independent	4/5 stars
NME	8/10
Pitchfork	7.8/10
Rolling Stone	4/5 stars
Spin	9/10

The Terror received mostly positive reviews from critics, with a score of 77 on metacritic, citing "Generally favorable feviews"

The review from The A.V. Club, states "The Terror is the sound of The Flaming Lips going from a group experience to an internal monologue, the perfect record for any fan who has ever felt like the band could use two “Feeling Yourself Disintegrate”s for every “Race For The Prize.”

Stuart Berman of Pitchfork Magazine states "with The Terror, the Lips take the bold step of bursting their own bubble. The band’s unrelentlingly bleak new album relates to its predecessor much as Yoshimi Battles the Pink Robots did to The Soft Bulletin, retaining its antecedent’s weighty mood but deconstructing the instrumental bombast into more skeletal, mechanical forms", but states later in the review "it still feels underdeveloped in spots. At 13 minutes, centerpiece track “You Lust” is the longest song to appear on a proper Lips record since the 1980s, and a companion piece to Embryonic’s “Powerless”, using a coolly repetitive organ refrain as the foundation for an agitated, free-form synth freakout. But its imposing grandeur is diffused by an intrusive, creepily whispered chorus incantation and a drifting, protracted denouement that lingers for far too long. And in the wake of the absorbing, slow-roiling intensity of the penultimate “Turning Violent”, the closing “Always There... In Our Heart” (a bookend echo of “Look… The Sun Is Rising”) doesn’t quite deliver the blown-out grand finale its repeated 1-2-3-4 build-ups suggest, instead simmering down before reaching full blast."

== In popular culture ==
The bonus song from the album, "Sun Blows Up Today", was featured in a 2013 Hyundai Super Bowl commercial.

== Track listing ==
All tracks are written by Wayne Coyne and Steven Drozd.

No.	Title	Length
1.	"Look... The Sun Is Rising"	5:11
2.	"Be Free, a Way"	5:13
3.	"Try to Explain"	5:00
4.	"You Lust" (featuring Phantogram)	13:02
5.	"The Terror"	6:21
6.	"You Are Alone"	3:46
7.	"Butterfly, How Long It Takes to Die"	7:30
8.	"Turning Violent"	4:16
9.	"Always There...In Our Hearts"	4:34
Total length:		54:53

=== iTunes exclusive tracks ===
No.	Title	Length
10.	"Sun Blows Up Today"	3:08
11.	"We Don't Control the Controls" (Mashed-the-F-Up Remix)	14:36

=== UK exclusive bonus disc ===
No.	Title	Length
10.	"Sun Blows Up Today"	3:10
11.	"All You Need Is Love" (written by Lennon–McCartney, featuring Alex and Jade of Edward Sharpe and the Magnetic Zeros)	5:06

== Personnel ==
The Flaming Lips

- Wayne Coyne – vocals, guitar, synthesizers
- Michael Ivins – bass, keyboards
- Steven Drozd – guitar, keyboards, synthesizers, bass, drums, vocals
- Kliph Scurlock – drums, percussion
- Derek Brown – keyboards, guitar

Guest performers

- Phantogram – additional vocals and music

Production

- The Flaming Lips – production, mix, recording
- Dave Fridmann – production, mix, recording, mastering
- Scott Booker – production
- Michael Ivins – additional engineering
- Mack Hawkins – additional engineering, recording & mixing

Packaging

- George Salisbury – layout and design

== Charts ==
Chart performance for The Terror
Chart (2013)	Peak position
Australian Albums (ARIA)	100
Belgian Albums (Ultratop Flanders)	39
Belgian Albums (Ultratop Wallonia)	199
Japanese Albums (Oricon)	50
UK Albums (OCC)	42
US Billboard 200	21
US Top Alternative Albums (Billboard)	6
US Top Rock Albums (Billboard)	6
