= 7 Skies H3 =

Song by The Flaming Lips

from the album 24 Hour Song Skull
- Language: English
- Released: October 31, 2011
- Recorded: 2011 at Tarbox Road Studios, Cassadaga, New York
- Genre: Experimental rock; neo-psychedelia; post-rock; noise rock; ambient; dark ambient; contemporary classical music; noise music; psychedelic rock
- Length: 1440:00 (Full version); 50:00 (CD version)
- Label: Warner Bros., Lovely Sorts of Death
- Songwriters: Wayne Coyne, Steven Drozd
- Producers: The Flaming Lips, Dave Fridmann, Scott Booker

"7 Skies H3" is a composition by American experimental rock band The Flaming Lips, released on October 31, 2011.

== Info ==
"7 Skies H3" is a single, 24-hour-long song contained in an EP, 24 Hour Song Skull. Although compiled as a contiguous, day-long song, it was recorded in separate pieces ranging anywhere from 25 minutes to 7 hours.

The song was released in a limited edition of 13 copies, on flash drives encased in real human skulls, for Halloween 2011. Each skull cost $5,000. A website was also set up, streaming the song on an endless loop.

On April 19, 2014 the band released a condensed 50 minute version, separated into 10 tracks, on a translucent vinyl LP for Record Store Day, limited to 7,500 copies. It was released on CD and Digital on May 19, 2014.

== Track listing ==
=== Full version ===
| No. | Title | Length |
|---|---|---|
| 1. | "7 Skies H3" | 1440:00 |

=== CD version ===
| No. | Title | Length |
|---|---|---|
| 1. | "7 Skies H3 (Can't Shut Off My Head)" | 8:25 |
| 2. | "Meepy Morp" | 2:58 |
| 3. | "Battling Voices From Beyond" | 3:09 |
| 4. | "In A Dream" | 4:51 |
| 5. | "Metamorphosis" | 5:17 |
| 6. | "Requiem" | 3:33 |
| 7. | "Meepy Morp (Reprise)" | 2:01 |
| 8. | "Riot In My Brain!!" | 4:32 |
| 9. | "7 Skies H3 (Main Theme)" | 6:32 |
| 10. | "Can't Let It Go" | 8:20 |
| Total length: | | 50:00 |

== Personnel ==
The Flaming Lips

- Wayne Coyne
- Michael Ivins
- Steven Drozd
- Kliph Scurlock
- Derek Brown
