= Hit to Death in the Future Head =

Studio album by the Flaming Lips
- Released: August 11, 1992
- Genres: Shoegazing; alternative rock; neo-psychedelia; noise pop
- Length: 69:04
- Label: Warner Bros.
- Producers: The Flaming Lips; Dave Fridmann

The Flaming Lips chronology
| In a Priest Driven Ambulance (1990) | Hit to Death in the Future Head (1992) | Transmissions from the Satellite Heart (1993) |

Singles from Hit to Death in the Future Head
- 1. "Talkin' 'Bout the Smiling Deathporn Immortality Blues (Everyone Wants to Live Forever)" Released: 1992; 2. "Frogs" Released: 1992

Hit to Death in the Future Head is the fifth studio album by American rock band the Flaming Lips, released on August 11, 1992, by Warner Bros. Records. "Talkin' 'Bout the Smiling Deathporn Immortality Blues (Everyone Wants to Live Forever)" was released as the lead track on the EP Yeah, I Know It's a Drag... But Wastin' Pigs Is Still Radical to promote the album. The title provided the inspiration for the name of the British band the Futureheads.

== Recording and release ==
Recorded in 1991 by the same lineup of the Flaming Lips that had been featured on In a Priest Driven Ambulance, the album's release was delayed for nearly a year due to the use of a sample from Michael Kamen's score for the 1985 film Brazil in the track "You Have to Be Joking (Autopsy of the Devil's Brain)", which required a lengthy clearance process. During the intervening period, both Nathan Roberts and Jonathan Donahue left the band (the latter resuming his duties in Mercury Rev). By the time of the album's release both Steven Drozd and Ronald Jones had joined, and performed on the subsequent tour.

The album is known for a particularly long hidden track at the end of the CD that consists of a continuous burst of staccato noise that pans from channel to channel and lasts for nearly a half-hour. This track is omitted from the vinyl and cassette release.

== Reception ==
Professional ratings
Review scores
| Source | Rating |
|---|---|
| AllMusic | 3.5/5 stars |
| The Encyclopedia of Popular Music | 3/5 stars |
| The Great Rock Discography | 6/10 |
| MusicHound Rock | 3.5/5 stars |
| The Rolling Stone Album Guide | 3.5/5 stars |
| Select | 5/5 |

From contemporary reviews, Andrew Perry of Select gave Hit to Death in the Future Head a five out of five rating, noting the groups "gorgeously melodic garage pop is rarely short of breathtaking", and compared the band to Mercury Rev, declaring that if "Yerself Is Steam has seldom left your turntable, this won't either. Magnificent."

From retrospective reviews, AllMusic's Jason Ankeny noted that even though the album's "not as conceptually tight as In a Priest Driven Ambulance", it's "no less cohesive or imaginative", and ultimately concluded that the album "serves as the bridge between the band's noisier, more hallucinatory indie work and the acid-bubblegum aesthetic perfected on their later Warner Bros. albums".

== Track listing ==
| No. | Title | Length |
|---|---|---|
| 1. | "Talkin' 'Bout the Smiling Deathporn Immortality Blues (Everyone Wants to Live Forever)" | 3:49 |
| 2. | "Hit Me Like You Did the First Time" | 3:41 |
| 3. | "The Sun" | 3:31 |
| 4. | "Felt Good to Burn" | 3:21 |
| 5. | "Gingerale Afternoon (The Astrology of a Saturday)" | 3:45 |
| 6. | "Halloween on the Barbary Coast" | 5:42 |
| 7. | "The Magician vs. the Headache" | 3:12 |
| 8. | "You Have to Be Joking (Autopsy of the Devil's Brain)" | 3:55 |
| 9. | "Frogs" | 4:28 |
| 10. | "Hold Your Head" | 4:24 |
| 11. | "Noise Loop" (hidden track) | 29:16 |
| Total length: | | 69:04 |

== Personnel ==
- Wayne Coyne – vocals, guitar
- Michael Ivins – bass
- Jonathan Donahue – guitar
- Nathan Roberts – drums
