= Electric Würms =

American rock band

- Genres: Psychedelic rock, progressive rock
- Years active: 2014–present
- Spinoff of: The Flaming Lips, Linear Downfall
- Members: Steven Drozd; Wayne Coyne; Chance Cook; Charlee Cook; Will Hicks; Dom Marcoaldi; Isabella gioello

Electric Würms are an American musical group, a collaboration between Steven Drozd and Wayne Coyne of The Flaming Lips, along with and all members of the group Linear Downfall. Their album, Musik, Die Schwer Zu Twerk, was released on August 18, 2014. The first single from the album is a cover version of "Heart Of The Sunrise", a 1971 song by progressive rock band Yes.

== Discography ==
- Musik, Die Schwer Zu Twerk (2014)
