= Flaming Lips Alley =

Street in Oklahoma City, Oklahoma, U.S.

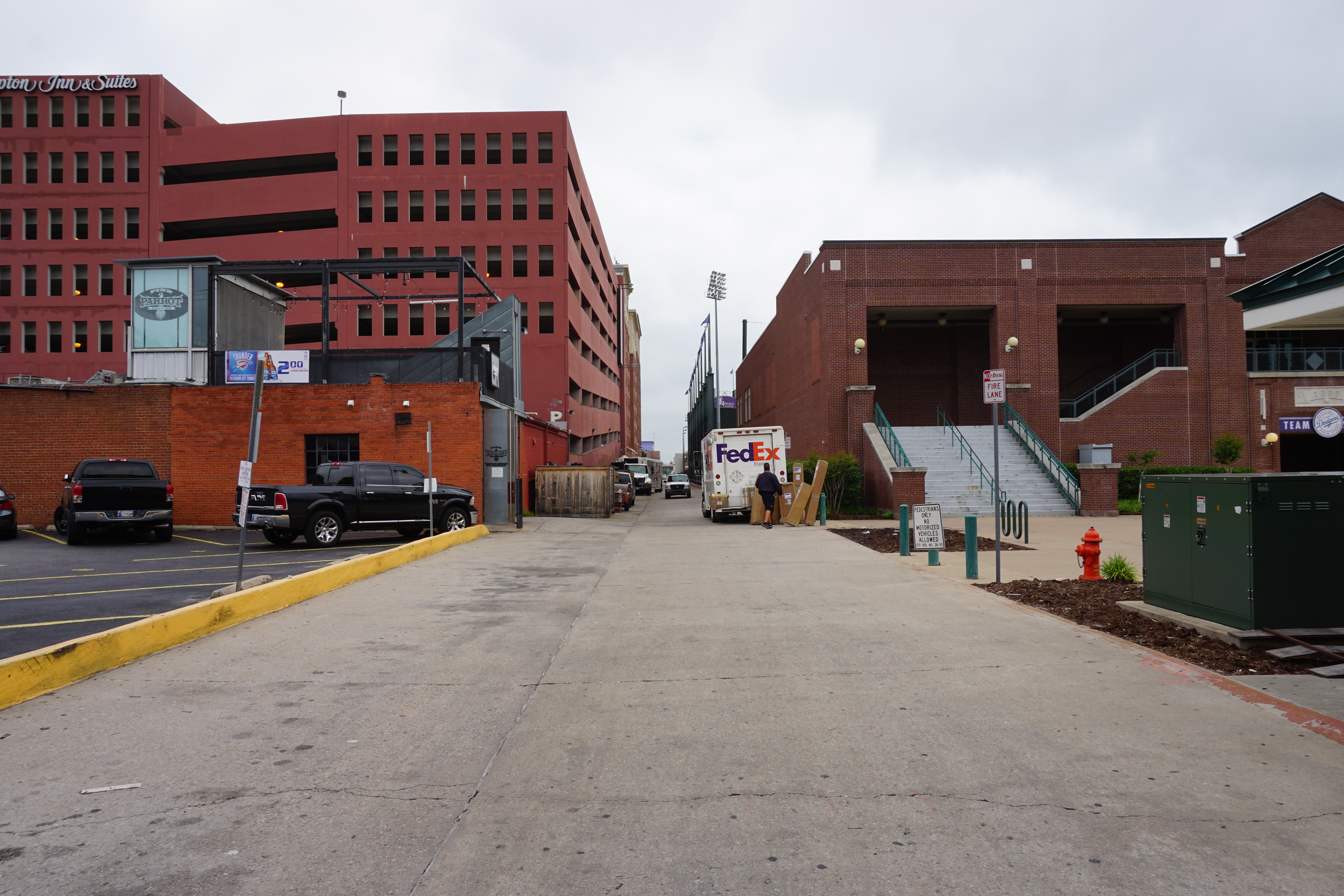
- The alley in 2016

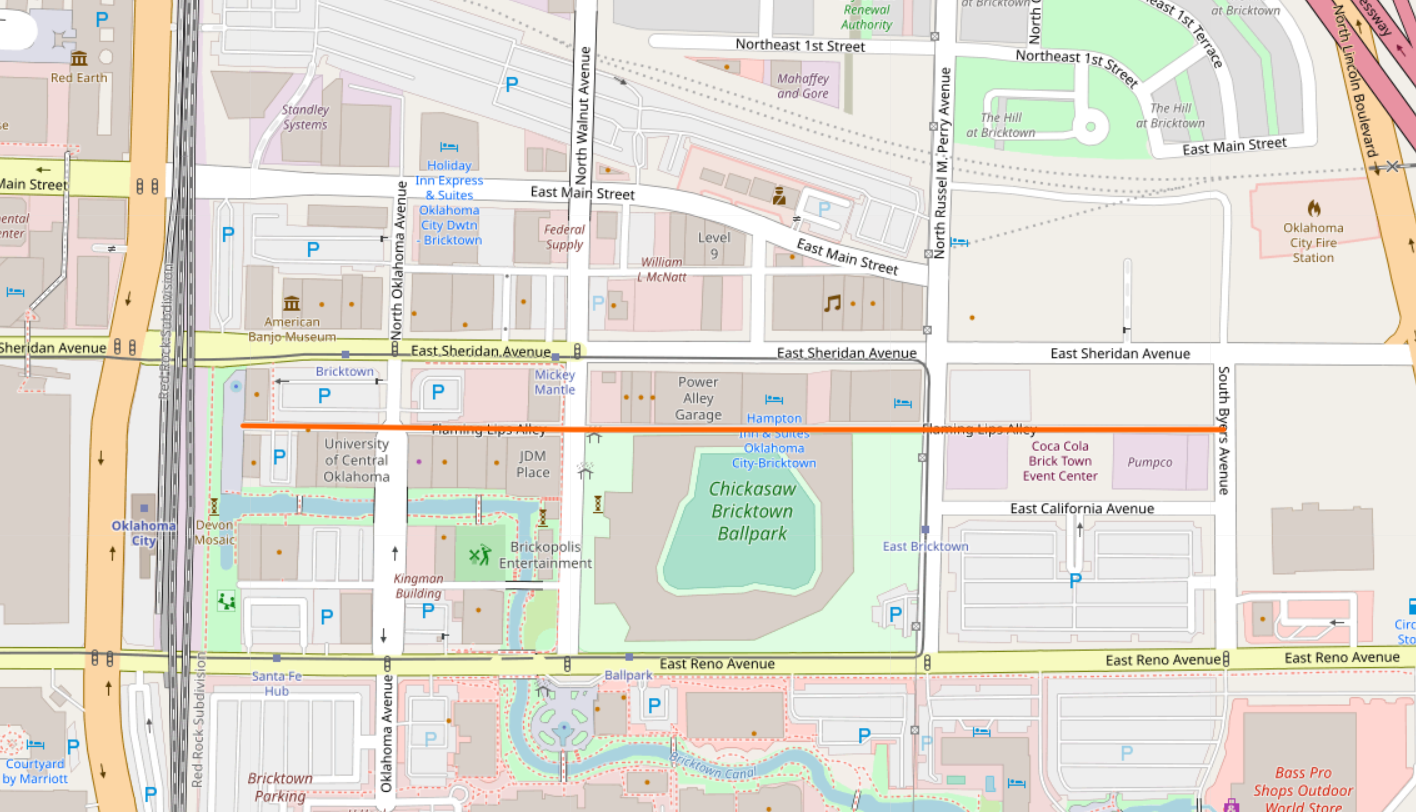
- Map of Bricktown with Flaming Lips Alley highlighted in red
- Former name: Previously unnamed
- Namesake: The Flaming Lips
- Type: Alley
- Owner: City of Oklahoma City
- Maintained by: City of Oklahoma City
- Length: 1,774.28 ft (540.80 m)
- Location: Bricktown, Oklahoma City, Oklahoma, United States
- Coordinates: 35°27′57″N 97°30′36″W
- West end: Bricktown Canal
- Major junctions: Oklahoma Avenue; Mickey Mantle Drive
- East end: Joe Carter Avenue

Construction
- Inauguration: October 26, 2007

Other
- Known for: Namesake
- Status: Open

Flaming Lips Alley is an alleyway in Bricktown, Oklahoma City, in the U.S. state of Oklahoma. The name of the street pays tribute to the band The Flaming Lips. Plans for the tribute were made public in 2006, and the alleyway was dedicated in 2007.

Prior to being named, The Oklahoman described the alley as "littered with open dumpsters and poorly lit at night." Mayor Mick Cornett called the description "an exaggeration," and that the alleyway was "very high-profile and very safe and clean."

Much of the alley is behind the Chickasaw Bricktown Ballpark, the home of the Oklahoma City Dodgers, the city's Minor League Baseball team. On the corner of Flaming Lips Alley and South Mickey Mantle Drive is the entrance to the Oklahoma Sports Hall of Fame.

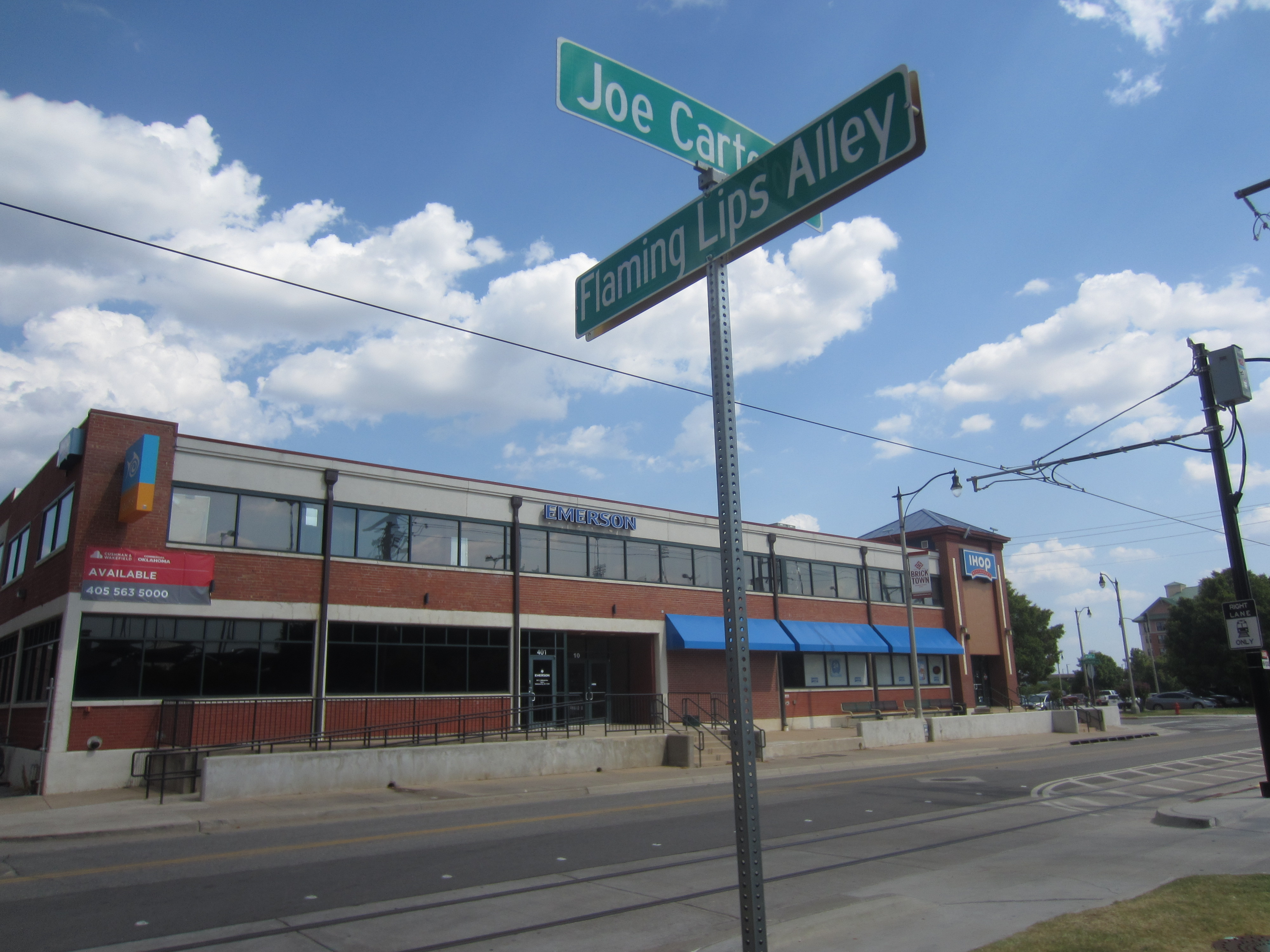
Street signage, 2019
