= Christmas on Mars =

2008 film by Wayne Coyne

- theatrical poster
- Directed by: Wayne Coyne
- Written by: Wayne Coyne
- Starring: Wayne Coyne; Steven Drozd; Michael Ivins; Steve Burns
- Cinematography: Bradley Beesley
- Edited by: George Salisbury
- Music by: The Flaming Lips
- Distributed by: Warner Independent Pictures
- Release date: November 11, 2008
- Running time: 83 minutes
- Country: United States
- Language: English

Christmas on Mars is a 2008 independent psychological science fiction film from the alternative rock band the Flaming Lips, written and directed by the band's frontman, Wayne Coyne, and featuring the entire band in the cast, as well as many of their associates, including Steve Burns, Adam Goldberg, and Fred Armisen.

The film began development in 2001, filming was completed in October 2005, and the film premiered on May 25, 2008 at the Sasquatch! Music Festival. For its general release in the United States, Christmas on Mars was booked into several dozen cities for unconventional screenings, in venues which included a former Ukrainian Socialist Social Club in New York City. The film was released in three different packages on November 11, 2008 through conventional retailers as well as through the band's website. A vinyl edition was released November 25, 2008.

== Plot ==
The film tells the story of the experiences of Major Syrtis during the first Christmas on a newly colonized Mars.

The main character, Major Syrtis (played by Steven Drozd), is trying to organize a Christmas pageant to celebrate the birth of the first colonist baby. A feature of the Mars mission is that a woman is giving birth to a baby from an artificial impregnation from the bubble she wears on her stomach. It's all timed, so she gives birth to this baby the second it hits midnight on Christmas. It is symbolically the beginning of a new civilization. But instead of being born from religious ideas, it's from a scientific idea.

A Martian then lands, but the Martian isn't really perceived as a Martian. People think he's another crazy guy who's flipped and turned himself green. They can't find a quick replacement for Santa, so they use this Martian guy. The Martian guy becomes the Martian and Santa Claus simultaneously.

== Cast ==
- Steven Drozd as Major Syrtis
- Wayne Coyne as the Alien Super-Being
- Michael Ivins as Deuteronilus
- Kliph Scurlock as Orcus
- Steve Burns as Astronaut
- Scott Booker as Sirenum
- Adam Goldberg as Dr. Scott Zero
- Fred Armisen as Noachis
- Mark Degraffenreid as Captain Icaria
- Jimmy Pike as Jim Eleven
- Kenny Coyne as Ed Fifteen

Cast notes

- Contrary to early reports, Isaac Brock of Modest Mouse and Elijah Wood do not appear in the film's final cut. However, a scene with Isaac Brock and Adam Goldberg exists on the DVD as an Easter egg.

== Production ==
At the beginning of 2002, over 20 minutes of edited film were ready, with music and preliminary sound effects also completed for these scenes. Most of the movie was shot on 16 mm film, with most of the sets based in Wayne's Oklahoma City house. Most scenes were filmed in and around Oklahoma City, using locations such as old industrial facilities. Further filming was done in Boston, Texas.

== Release ==
Originally, Christmas on Mars was not to be released at conventional movie theaters. Instead, a DVD release would be preceded by a number of screenings at rock venues. Speaking to mtv.com, Coyne has explained "We want to show the movie with a mega-sound system and snow machines and just make it like a bigger event than what has become the typical movie-going experience. I'm hoping that people can watch this movie while they drink beer, smoke cigarettes, and have a good time."

By October 2007, the film was in the final editing stage and the band was also transferring it to HD and adding "in-depth special effects." On September 12, 2008, the film made its New York City debut at 7am within the KGB Complex, a former Ukrainian Socialist Social Club, on the Lower East Side.

== DVD ==
The film was released on DVD November 11, 2008 in three different packages designed by the band's visual generalist George Salisbury. One is a conventional DVD available at conventional retailers. There is also a deluxe edition containing the film on DVD in addition to a soundtrack CD. The Mega Deluxe Edition includes: The Film and Soundtrack (in special Deluxe Edition packaging), an exclusive T-shirt, a collectible movie ticket replicating those used during the rock festival tour, trading cards featuring all four members of the band from the movie on one side and performing on stage on the other, an "Eat Your Own Spaceship" bumper sticker, and a box of "Flaming Lips" popcorn featuring Wayne as the Martian. The first 1,000 Mega Deluxe Edition versions will have the popcorn boxes signed by all four members of the Flaming Lips. Of those 1,000 copies ten will contain a "golden ticket" good for two tickets to the Lips annual New Year's Eve concert in Oklahoma City. The vinyl edition is slated for release on November 25, 2008. The DVD contains at least one easter egg.

== Soundtrack ==
Once Beyond Hopelessness

Soundtrack album by the Flaming Lips
- Released: November 11, 2008
- Recorded: January 2001 – September 2008
- Genres: Electronic music, score
- Length: 32:43
- Label: Warner Bros.
- Producer: The Flaming Lips

The Flaming Lips chronology
Atlas Eets Christmas (2007)	Once Beyond Hopelessness (2008)	Embryonic (2009)

Professional ratings
Review scores
Source	Rating
AllMusic	4/5 stars
Okayplayer	(75/100)
The Quietus	(favourable)
Pitchfork	(7.1/10)

Two tracks from the movie soundtrack, "Protonilus Death March" and "Syrtis Major" were released as a 5000-only picture-disc EP late in 2004, available only through the band's online store in conjunction with the purchase of their limited-edition pictorial biography Waking Up With a Placebo Headwound. "Syrtis Major" and another soundtrack cut, "Xanthe Terra", were also released as B-sides to the 2-part European single release of "Do You Realize??" These songs are both entirely instrumental, in a similar style to acclaimed Lips instrumentals such as the Grammy-winning Approaching Pavonis Mons by Balloon (Utopia Planitia). For the final soundtrack release, "Protonilus Death March" has been renamed to "The Gleaming Armament of Marching Genitalia," "Syrtis Major" is now "Space Bible With Volume Lumps" and "Xanthe Terra" is now "Suicide and Extraordinary Mistakes."

=== Track listing ===
No.	Title	Length
1.	"Once Beyond Hopelessness"	3:07
2.	"The Distance Between Mars and the Earth, Pt. 1"	0:52
3.	"The Horrors of Isolation: The Celestial Dissolve, Triumphant Hallucination, Light Being Absorbed"	4:39
4.	"In Excelsior Vaginalistic"	3:02
5.	"Your Spaceship Comes from Within"	1:28
6.	"Suicide and Extraordinary Mistakes"	3:28
7.	"The Distance Between Mars and the Earth, Pt. 2"	0:57
8.	"The Secret of Immortality: This Strange Feeling, This Impossible World"	3:43
9.	"The Gleaming Armament of Marching Genitalia"	3:58
10.	"The Distress Signals of Celestial Objects"	2:11
11.	"Space Bible with Volume Lumps"	3:15
12.	"Once Beyond Hopelessness"	2:03

== See also ==
- List of films set on Mars
