= Transmissions from the Satellite Heart =

Studio album by the Flaming Lips
- Released: June 22, 1993
- Recorded: January–February 1993
- Genres: Neo-psychedelia; alternative rock; noise pop; noise rock
- Length: 43:04
- Label: Warner Bros.
- Producers: The Flaming Lips; Keith Cleversley

The Flaming Lips chronology
Hit to Death in the Future Head (1992)	Transmissions from the Satellite Heart (1993)	Clouds Taste Metallic (1995)

Singles from Transmissions from the Satellite Heart
- 1. "She Don't Use Jelly" Released: October 1993 / August 1994; 2. "Turn It On" Released: April 1995

Professional ratings
Review scores
Source	Rating
AllMusic	4.5/5 stars
Chicago Tribune	4/4 stars
Encyclopedia of Popular Music	3/5 stars
The Great Rock Discography	8/10
MusicHound	5/5
NME	7/10
Rolling Stone	4/5 stars
The Rolling Stone Album Guide	4.5/5 stars
Select	4/5

Transmissions from the Satellite Heart is the sixth studio album by American rock band the Flaming Lips, released in 1993 by Warner Bros. Records. The album marked the departure of Jonathan Donahue (to Mercury Rev) and Nathan Roberts, and the addition of guitarist Ronald Jones and drummer Steven Drozd.

The track "She Don't Use Jelly" is notable for being the band's first charting radio hit, after its video was featured on the MTV series Beavis and Butt-Head nearly a year after the album's release. "Turn It On" was also a moderately successful single, and also had two different music videos, one of which was shot at a laundromat. By 2002, Transmissions from the Satellite Heart had sold 300,000 copies worldwide.

The EP Due to High Expectations... The Flaming Lips Are Providing Needles for Your Balloons was released the following year to promote the album and featured live versions of "Chewin the Apple of Yer Eye" and "Slow•Nerve•Action."

== Critical reception ==
Trouser Press wrote that "as post-punk novelty singles go, 'She Don’t Use Jelly' ... is grade-A whimsy, with Coyne’s wobbly singing the perfect complement to the band’s loose-limbed rumble."

== Track listing ==
All songs written by the Flaming Lips except where noted.

No.	Title	Writer(s)	Length
1.	"Turn It On"		4:39
2.	"Pilot Can at the Queer of God"		4:16
3.	"Oh My Pregnant Head (Labia in the Sunlight)"		4:06
4.	"She Don't Use Jelly"		3:40
5.	"Chewin the Apple of Yer Eye"		3:52
6.	"Superhumans"		3:13
7.	"Be My Head"		3:15
8.	"Moth in the Incubator"		4:12
9.	"Plastic Jesus" ( (Note: "Plastic Jesus" is listed as "★★★★★★★" on all packaging. In liner notes, it is called "Song from Cool Hand Luke".))	Ed Rush, George Cromarty	2:18
10.	"When Yer Twenty Two"		3:34
11.	"Slow•Nerve•Action"		5:55

== Personnel ==
- Wayne Coyne – vocals, guitar
- Steven Drozd – drums, keyboards, guitar, vocals
- Michael Ivins – bass, backing vocals
- Ronald Jones – guitar, backing vocals
- Keith Cleversley – recording engineer, mixing engineer

== Charts ==
Chart (1995)	Peak position
US Billboard 200	108
