= Zaireeka =

1997 studio album by the Flaming Lips

Studio album by the Flaming Lips
- Released: October 28, 1997
- Recorded: 1996–97
- Genres: Experimental pop; dream pop; experimental rock; psychedelic rock
- Length: 45:26
- Label: Warner Bros.
- Producers: The Flaming Lips; Dave Fridmann; Scott Booker

The Flaming Lips chronology
Clouds Taste Metallic (1995)	Zaireeka (1997)	The Soft Bulletin (1999)

Zaireeka is the eighth studio album by the American rock band the Flaming Lips, released on October 28, 1997, by Warner Bros. Records. It consists of four CDs designed so that when played simultaneously on four separate audio systems, they would produce a harmonic or juxtaposed sound; the discs could also be played in different combinations, omitting one, two or three discs. Each of its eight songs consists of four stereo tracks, one from each CD.

The album's title is a portmanteau of two words. Zaire was chosen as a symbol of anarchy after Wayne Coyne heard a radio news story about the nation's political instability. The word Eureka (literally: "I have found it") was selected as an expression of joyous discovery.

Zaireeka was the first album by the band after the departure of guitarist Ronald Jones. It acted as a preview of the music and style that would surface on the next album The Soft Bulletin (1999), which was recorded during the same sessions as Zaireeka, and is the predecessor to the band's more conventional surround sound releases.

== Background ==
Adverse circumstances led to the production of Zaireeka. The departure of guitarist Ronald Jones compelled the band to change fundamentally. In addition, the limited success of the previous album, Clouds Taste Metallic, threatened their status at Warner Bros. Records. They eventually found that drummer Steven Drozd could compensate for the loss of Jones by becoming a multi-instrumentalist. However, live shows proved to be more challenging and in order to maintain activity and output, Wayne Coyne conceived an experimental show.

=== The Parking Lot Experiments ===
During 1996 and 1997, the Flaming Lips ran a series of events known as "The Parking Lot Experiments". The concept was inspired by an incident in Coyne's youth, where he noticed that car radios in the parking lot at a concert were playing the same songs at the same time, Wayne Coyne created 40 cassette tapes to be played in synchronization. The band invited people to bring their cars to parking lots, where they would be given one of the tapes and then instructed when to start them. The music was "a strange, fluid 20 minute sound composition".

=== Production ===
Production of the album was preceded by two unfortunate events, which were recounted in "The Spiderbite Song" from The Soft Bulletin. Michael Ivins was involved in a car crash, and Steven Drozd's hand became severely infected. Drozd initially claimed that his hand had been bitten by a spider, although later he admitted the infected abscess was caused by injection of heroin.

The Flaming Lips began work on Zaireeka in April 1997 in the then-new Tarbox Road Studios. Initially, the band was frustrated while making the album. Even after diverting half of the budget for the next album into Zaireeka, there were no tangible results. The band experienced difficulty writing songs for the album. Finally, Coyne exclaimed, "Look, we don't have to be friends... but we have to make this record!" While this philosophy aided progress, the band only began to complete songs when they learned to write for the medium as opposed to trying to split normal songs across four CDs.

The group wrote several songs that were unsuccessful in the four-CD format. These songs, including "Race for the Prize", were reserved for the next album, which would eventually become The Soft Bulletin.

=== Release ===
Warner Bros. Records was initially apprehensive about releasing Zaireeka, so manager Scott Booker carefully researched the costs of releasing a box set. Booker discovered that Zaireeka could be released so that once 12,000 copies had been sold, the label would break even. (Advance orders for the album came to 14,000 copies.) Booker pitched the album to Warner Bros. Records president Steven Baker.

Eventually, the two factions reached an agreement in which the album would be released, although Zaireeka would not count towards the seven albums the band was contracted to deliver to Warner Bros. For an advance of $200,000, the band would make both Zaireeka and The Soft Bulletin. In addition, Booker mentioned that by allowing the media to proclaim how "weird" the band was with Zaireeka, they would be more prepared to treat The Soft Bulletin as a serious album. Zaireeka was released in October, 1997. As of 2006, 28,000 copies have been sold.

=== Logistics of listening ===
The speakers being used may be physically positioned in many different configurations (e.g. at different heights or even in entirely different rooms). Some listeners may even choose to disable the left or right speaker of one or more systems. Synchronization errors between the audio systems may cause effects such as reverb or echo being heard on one disc before the original sound is produced from another. Further, the type and quality of each audio system affect the relationship between the four CDs.

=== The Boom Box Experiments ===
After completion of Zaireeka, the Flaming Lips tried an unconventional method to tour the album. "The Boom Box Experiments", like "The Parking Lot Experiments", involved tapes being played at the same time. However, these shows were held in conventional rock venues, and the band supplied their own boom boxes. Coyne and Drozd conducted two "choirs" of people controlling the boom boxes, giving them instructions for actions like turning the volume up or down, while Ivins controlled the mixer.

Songs played in The Boom Box Experiments include:

- "The Big Ol' Bug Is the New Baby Now"
- "A Winter's Day Car Accident Melody"
- "Altruism, or That's the Crotch Calling the Devil Black"
- "Heralding in a Better Ego"
- "Realizing the Speed of Life"
- "Schizophrenic Sunrise, or The Loudest Blade of Grass"
- "Should We Keep the Severed Head Awake??" (used in both the Parking Lot and Boom Box experiments. Part of it was included on "Sleeping on the Roof" on The Soft Bulletin.)

=== Aftermath and legacy ===
"It was and is 'surround sound' for the extreme fanatic."

— Wayne Coyne, Yoshimi Battles the Pink Robots 5.1 liner notes

With Zaireeka, the Flaming Lips had overcome the loss of Ronald Jones and proved they could still work as a band. The situation at Warner Bros. Records was still dire, including a risk of being dropped from the label. However, songs had already been written for the next album, The Soft Bulletin, which would be both a critical hit for the band and their breakthrough into mainstream success. Following the release of Yoshimi Battles the Pink Robots in 2002, the Flaming Lips would return to the concept of surround sound with a DVD-Audio special-edition of that album in 2003.

Zaireeka is viewed by the band as nothing more than an experimental release. "It was, and still is, intended to be listened to by other artists, musicians and producers," Coyne would later state in the liner notes for The Soft Bulletin 5.1, adding that they "never expected the less involved members of our audience to care about it." As noted above, there was no conventional concert tour to promote Zaireeka. However, three of its eight songs have been played live. “Riding to Work in the Year 2025 (Your Invisible Now)” and "Thirty-Five Thousand Feet Of Despair" were played on the tour supporting The Soft Bulletin and also on the Lips’ 2007 and 2013 tours (the latter not being part of the later tours) and “How Will We Know? (Futuristic Crashendos)” was played in 2000 and 2002. To mark the year in the song's title, during the 2025 Yoshimi Battles the Pink Robots anniversary shows, the band performed “Riding to Work in the Year 2025 (Your Invisible Now)” again.

== Songs ==
"Thirty-Five Thousand Feet of Despair" (Disc 1)
29 second sample from the first disc

"Thirty-Five Thousand Feet of Despair" (Disc 2)
29 second sample from the second disc

"Thirty-Five Thousand Feet of Despair" (Disc 3)
29 second sample from the third disc

"Thirty-Five Thousand Feet of Despair" (Disc 4)
29 second sample from the fourth disc

"Thirty-Five Thousand Feet of Despair" (Stereo Mixdown)
29 second sample from all four discs combined

Zaireeka opens with "Okay I'll Admit That I Really Don't Understand", a mantra of sorts about the admitted lack of comprehension regarding one's situation. The second track, "Riding to Work in the Year 2025 (Your Invisible Now)" [sic] tells a science-fiction story about a man who pretends to be a secret agent in the future and imagines his own psychological demise from the stress "of being the most important secret agent in the world". "Thirty-Five Thousand Feet of Despair", the third song, is the tragic story of an airplane pilot who hangs himself mid-flight. The next song, "A Machine in India", is about the "dull and depressing, mild insanity" that the speaker's partner slips into during her menstrual cycle. Next, "The Train Runs over the Camel but Is Derailed by the Gnat", is a speech by a man who is on the verge of discovery, but ends up "talking himself into circles". Track six, "How Will We Know? (Futuristic Crashendos)", is based on an urban legend that being exposed to high and low frequencies can cause a person to experience premonitions, and thus contains its infamously extensive frequencies that caused the band to place a warning on the album cover and inside the booklet. The seventh song, "March of the Rotten Vegetables", is "music for a cartoon about a group of demented vegetables". The eighth and final song, "The Big Ol' Bug Is the New Baby Now", contains a spoken-word story about Coyne's dogs; the track ends the album with loud barking from each disc. On the 10th anniversary of Zaireeka, Wayne Coyne made and distributed an additional 5th disc to go along with the set.

== Critical reception ==
Professional ratings
Review scores
Source	Rating
AllMusic	4/5 stars
Entertainment Weekly	A
NME	10/10
Pitchfork	0.0/10
Rolling Stone	4/5 stars
The Rolling Stone Album Guide	3/5 stars

Critical reaction to Zaireeka was polarized. Josh Kun of Rolling Stone wrote that the album's "wall-of-surround-sound approach melds droning-rock dissonance with warped, off-kilter pop melodies, producing a totally immersing post-Pet Sounds audio séance." Jason Ankeny of AllMusic stated that the album would only really be accessible to hardcore Flaming Lips fans, but that "they're in for the musical experience of a lifetime".

Critics who disliked the album cited what they viewed as a ridiculous concept. Salon remarked in its review that "Musically [...] their 1995 album Clouds Taste Metallic offers the same psychotic results without all the technological hassle. And conceptually? The same thing, just all at once: stupid, stupid, stupid, stupid." Jason Josephes from Pitchfork awarded the album a score of 0.0 out of 10; in a scathing review, Josephes criticized the album for being inaccessible, asking "Do I want to buy three more CD players with which to enjoy Zaireeka or, say, eat?" and derided the band's fans. Nonetheless, in June 2002, editor-in-chief of Pitchfork, Mark Richardson published a response to Josephes' review (which has since been deleted), lauding the album and referring to it as "one of the greatest albums ever recorded". Richardson writes:

While I understand the desire to own these songs in a format that makes repeat playability easy, that's not what this album is about to me. Zaireeka is not just the album the Flaming Lips released between Clouds Taste Metallic and The Soft Bulletin; it's a challenge to the assumptions behind the idea of recorded music.

In October 2009, Richardson went on to write a book titled Zaireeka for the 33 1/3 book series, published by Continuum International Publishing, now owned by Bloomsbury Publishing. In it, Richardson chronicles the creation of the album, praises it from multiple angles, and discusses the impact the album has had on music since its release. The album was included in Pitchfork's 2010 list of "ten unusual CD-era gimmicks".

== Other formats ==
Wayne Coyne had initially confirmed that Zaireeka would eventually be released on DVD format in the vein of the surround-sound special editions of Yoshimi Battles the Pink Robots, The Soft Bulletin, and At War with the Mystics, but it is unlikely to happen due to the deliberately out-of-sync nature of the original multitrack recordings.

In the UK, the "Race for the Prize" and "Waitin' for a Superman" CD singles were released in 2-disc sets. Each disc of the two sets contained a different version of "Riding to Work in the Year 2025 (Your Invisible Now)" and "Thirty-Five Thousand Feet of Despair". This marked the first time material from the album would be released in the four-disc format in Europe. The "Waitin' for a Superman" Maxi-CD, as released in the US, contains stereo mixes of the two songs.

The Soft Bulletin Companion, initially a promo-only CD release in 1999 but reissued commercially in 2021, contains the two stereo tracks already made available on the "Waitin' for a Superman" single in addition to stereo mixes of "A Machine in India," "Okay I'll Admit," and "The Big Ol' Bug" (as they are titled on the CD).

The album was reissued on vinyl for Record Store Day 2013.

== Track listing ==
All 4 discs have the same track listings.

All tracks are written by The Flaming Lips.

No.	Title	Length
1.	"Okay, I'll Admit That I Really Don't Understand"	2:50
2.	"Riding to Work in the Year 2025 (Your Invisible Now)"	7:03
3.	"Thirty-Five Thousand Feet of Despair"	5:00
4.	"A Machine in India"	10:23
5.	"The Train Runs Over the Camel, But Is Derailed by the Gnat"	6:14
6.	"How Will We Know? (Futuristic Crashendos)"	2:23
7.	"March of the Rotten Vegetables"	6:28
8.	"The Big Ol' Bug Is the New Baby Now"	5:05
Total length:		45:26

== Personnel ==
The Flaming Lips

- Wayne Coyne – vocals, guitars
- Steven Drozd – drums, guitars, keyboards, orchestration, vocals
- Michael Ivins – bass guitar, backing vocals

Technical

- Scott Booker – production
- Dave Fridmann – engineering, mastering, mixing, production
- George Salisbury – layout design
