= Embryonic (album) =

Studio album by the Flaming Lips
- Released: October 13, 2009
- Recorded: February–July 2009
- Studios: Tarbox Road Studios (Cassadaga, New York); Dull Roar Studios (Oklahoma City, Oklahoma)
- Genres: Acid rock; psychedelic rock
- Length: 70:52
- Label: Warner Bros.
- Producers: The Flaming Lips; Dave Fridmann; Scott Booker

The Flaming Lips chronology
Once Beyond Hopelessness (2008)	Embryonic (2009)	The Flaming Lips and Stardeath and White Dwarfs with Henry Rollins and Peaches Doing The Dark Side of the Moon (2009)

Embryonic is the twelfth studio album by American rock band the Flaming Lips released on October 13, 2009, on Warner Bros. The band's first double album, it was released to generally positive reviews and became their most successful album in the US, peaking at number 8 on the Billboard 200. This is the first album where drummer Kliph Scurlock is credited alongside the rest of the band despite touring with the group since 2002 and contributing drum parts to the previous album At War with the Mystics (2006).

== Production ==
News of the album first surfaced in an interview with Wayne Coyne, who stated that "Somewhere along the way it occurred to me that we should do a double album... Just this idea that you can weave a couple of themes into there and you can sprawl a little bit.

Several other artists made contributions to various tracks on the album. German mathematician Dr. Thorsten Wörmann contributed to the track "Gemini Syringes", psychedelic rock band MGMT contributed to the song "Worm Mountain", and Karen O (lead singer of the alternative rock trio Yeah Yeah Yeahs) contributed to the songs "I Can Be a Frog" and "Watching the Planets". Karen O's contributions were recorded by Wayne Coyne over the phone.

== Background and promotion ==
On August 13, 2009, the song "See the Leaves" was reviewed and streamed on Pitchfork.com On September 3, 2009, the album was previewed in its entirety on The Fly website, using Wayne Coyne's own track-by-track guide.

On September 17, 2009, the band appeared on The Colbert Report and announced that the album would stream in its entirety on Colbertnation.com until September 21, 2009.

Embryonic was streamed in full on the UK music site Clash Music on October 5, just over a week ahead of its release. It was selected as fourth best album of 2009 by Pitchfork Media.

== Critical reception ==
Professional ratings
Aggregate scores
Source	Rating
AnyDecentMusic?	7.2/10
Metacritic	81/100
Review scores
Source	Rating
AllMusic	4/5 stars
The A.V. Club	A−
The Daily Telegraph	4/5 stars
Entertainment Weekly	B
The Guardian	3/5 stars
MSN Music (Consumer Guide)	A−
NME	9/10
Pitchfork	9.0/10
Rolling Stone	3/5 stars
Spin	7/10

Embryonic received acclaim from critics upon release, garnering an 81/100 score (indicating "universal acclaim") on Metacritic based on 33 critics. NME wrote that "ten years after their last masterpiece, The Flaming Lips have finally produced another one," while Paste described the record as "a wonderfully weird parade of sonic delights: an arresting consummation of the Lips' two-and-a-half decade career." Other critics praised the album but were also quick to note its dramatically different sound in comparison to previous releases. Mojo remarked that "(Embryonic's) themes may be familiar, but its fine, dazzlingly outlandish music is fresh and utterly fearless." Graeme Thomson in The Observer described the album as a "fragmented, loose, indulgent, occasionally inspired, [and] considerably heavier than their last outing". Stuart Berman in Pitchfork called it a " an unrelentingly paranoid, static-soaked acid-rock epic" and praised the raw directness of the material. David Machese in Spin Magazine also noted the uncompromising sound and lyrical content, describing it as "the band's coldest, darkest, slipperiest, least organic work yet.

As of 2011, the album has sold 103,000 copies in the United States.

== Sound and influence ==
The style of the tracks on Embryonic differs from the styles of previous albums, Yoshimi Battles the Pink Robots and At War with the Mystics, and has been reported to be similar to the style of Joy Division, Miles Davis, and John Lennon.

Wayne Coyne says the new record solves their perpetual "dilemma" of what to include on each album, by dumping all their ideas on the follow-up to 2006's At War with the Mystics. Coyne had this to say about the double-LP decision to Billboard: "Some of my favorite records – thinking Beatles' White Album, Zeppelin's Physical Graffiti and even some of the longer things that The Clash have done – part of the reason I like them is that they're not focused. They're kind of like a free-for-all and go everywhere. It's not necessarily because we're prolific, I think we always stay in a sort of perpetual panic of like we never have more songs than we need and we always wonder if any of them are any good to begin with." Coyne notes that Embryonic is less polished than Mystics or 2002's Yoshimi Battles the Pink Robots and has a "freak-out vibe". The frontman also notes the influence of Miles Davis's group and slow-burn songs like John Lennon's "Instant Karma!".

== Deluxe edition ==
A deluxe version of the album was released on October 13, 2009.

The deluxe edition includes the original 18 tracks (on two discs) as well as a bonus DVD-Audio which features the album in full dynamic range at 24bit/96 kHz audio. A further variant sold exclusively through the band's website is packaged in a "fur pack" with an extended booklet which features additional art, lyrics, and band photos. This web-only deluxe edition also comes with a 14-inch by 28-inch lithograph featuring the full album cover. A limited number of pre-orders received an additional lithograph autographed by the band, shipped 2–3 weeks after the release date.

== Track listing ==
No.	Title	Length
1.	"Convinced of the Hex"	3:56
2.	"The Sparrow Looks Up at the Machine"	4:14
3.	"Evil"	5:38
4.	"Aquarius Sabotage"	2:11
5.	"See the Leaves"	4:24
6.	"If"	2:05
7.	"Gemini Syringes"	3:41
8.	"Your Bats"	2:35
9.	"Powerless"	6:57
10.	"The Ego's Last Stand"	5:40
11.	"I Can Be a Frog"	2:14
12.	"Sagittarius Silver Announcement"	2:59
13.	"Worm Mountain"	5:21
14.	"Scorpio Sword"	2:02
15.	"The Impulse"	3:30
16.	"Silver Trembling Hands"	3:58
17.	"Virgo Self-Esteem Broadcast"	3:45
18.	"Watching the Planets"	5:16
Total length:		70:26

=== Itunes exclusive bonus tracks ===
No.	Title	Length
19.	"UFOs Over Baghdad"	5:18
20.	"What Does it Mean?"	5:10
21.	"Just Above Love"	4:49
22.	"Anything You Say Now, I Believe You"	6:40

== Personnel ==
The Flaming Lips

- Wayne Coyne – lead vocals, guitar, theremin, keyboards, vocoder, mixing, production
- Steven Drozd – guitars, keyboards, drums, bass, backing vocals, lead vocals on "If", mixing, production
- Michael Ivins – bass, keyboards, backing vocals, mixing, production, additional engineering
- Kliph Scurlock – drums, percussion

Additional personnel

- Scott Booker – production
- Dave Fridmann – production, mixing, programming, engineering, mastering
- MGMT – additional singing and playing (track 13)
- Karen O – additional singing, screaming, animal sounds and noises (tracks: 7, 11, 18)
- Thorsten Wörmann – spoken announcements (tracks: 7, 17)

== Charts ==
Chart performance for Embryonic
Chart (2009)	Peak
Australian Albums (ARIA)	43
Belgian Albums (Ultratop Flanders)	50
Canadian Albums (Nielsen SoundScan)	37
Irish Albums (IRMA)	47
Scottish Albums (Official Charts)	46
UK Albums (Official Charts)	43
US Billboard 200	8

Embryonic moved 32,000 copies in its first week on US charts.
