= The Flaming Lips =

American rock band

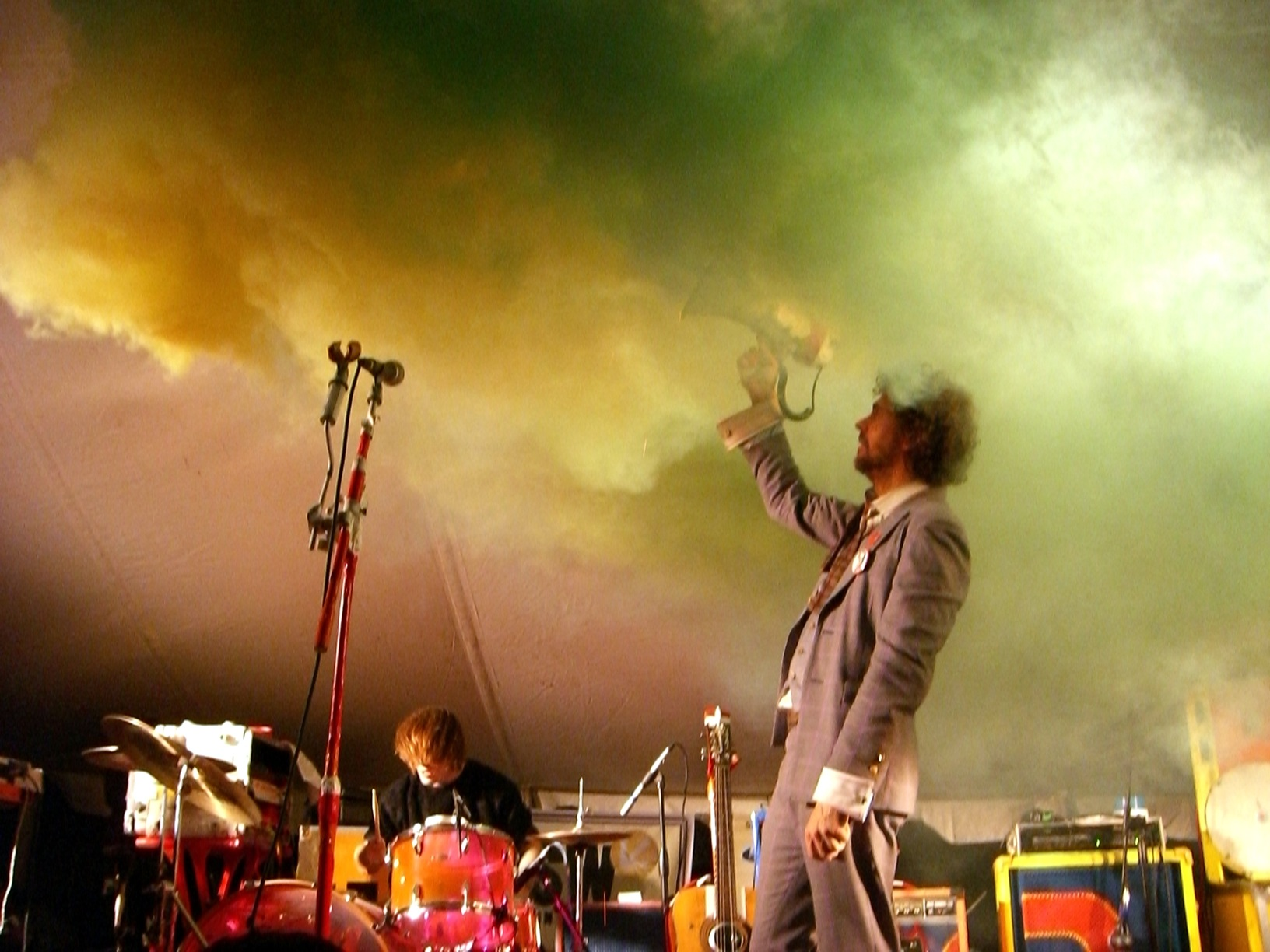
- The Flaming Lips in 2006

Background information
- Origin: Oklahoma City, Oklahoma, U.S.
- Genres: Neo-psychedelia; psychedelic rock; alternative rock; experimental rock; noise pop; psychedelic pop
- Works: Discography
- Years active: 1983–present
- Labels: Restless; Enigma Records; Warner; Bella Union; Third Man Records
- Members: Wayne Coyne; Derek Brown; Matt Duckworth Kirksey; Tommy McKenzie; AJ Slaughter
- Past members: Steven Drozd; Michael Ivins; Mark Coyne; Dave Kostka; Richard English; Jonathan Donahue; Nathan Roberts; Jon Mooneyham; Ronald Jones; Kliph Scurlock; Jake Ingalls; Nicholas Ley
- Website: flaminglips.com

The Flaming Lips are an American psychedelic rock band formed in 1983 in Oklahoma City, Oklahoma. The band currently consists of Wayne Coyne (vocals, guitars, bass, keyboards), Derek Brown (keyboards, guitars, percussion), Matt Duckworth Kirksey (drums, percussion, keyboards), AJ Slaughter (guitar, keyboards, pedal steel) and Tommy McKenzie (bass). Coyne is the only remaining founding member following the departure of bassist and keyboardist Michael Ivins in 2021. From 1991 to 2024, Steven Drozd played a crucial role in the band as co-songwriter and multi-instrumentalist.

The band started out playing garage punk and noise pop, before branching into more psychedelic and experimental territory. They recorded several albums and EPs on an indie label, Restless, in the 1980s and early 1990s. After signing to Warner Brothers they released Hit to Death in the Future Head (1992), followed by Transmissions from the Satellite Heart (1993) and the hit single "She Don't Use Jelly" which broke the band into the mainstream. They later released The Soft Bulletin (1999), which was NME magazine's Album of the Year, followed by the critically acclaimed Yoshimi Battles the Pink Robots (2002). In February 2007, they were nominated for a BRIT Award for "Best International Act". The group has won three Grammy Awards, including two for Best Rock Instrumental Performance. They were placed on Q magazine's list of the "50 Bands to See Before You Die" in 2002.

== History ==
=== Early history and releases (1983–1990) ===
The Flaming Lips formed in Oklahoma City in 1983 with Wayne Coyne on guitar, his brother Mark singing lead vocals, Michael Ivins on bass and Dave Kotska on drums. The band debuted at Oklahoma City's Blue Note Lounge. After they hired Dave Kotska as the drummer, Richard English joined the band in 1984. That same year they recorded The Flaming Lips EP, their only release with Mark singing lead vocals.

There are several theories as to how the band chose their name. One possibility is that it was inspired by the 1953 feature film Geraldine, in which comedian Stan Freberg sings several songs, including one named "Flaming Lips". Another possible source is from the 1964 Shirley MacLaine film What a Way to Go! in which Gene Kelly's character stars in a film titled Flaming Lips. However, according to an article in the September 16, 1993, issue of Rolling Stone, Mark and Wayne came up with the name as a reference to a rumor about a classmate who contracted genital herpes after receiving cunnilingus from a partner with active cold sores. Wayne elaborated:

When Mark and I were in, I think it was Junior Year in High School, there was a rumor about this girl who got herpes from this guy at a party. He went down on her with a cold sore. I don't think we knew the girl, and I'm not sure if she even existed, you know how kids just spread bullshit. But when we were thinking of band names one night over a pack of Schlitz and some left-handed cigarettes and remembered how we joked that they both had "Flaming Lips" and it just stuck.

After his brother's departure, Wayne assumed the vocal duties and the band recorded their first full-length album, Hear It Is, on Pink Dust Records (the psychedelic-rock imprint of Enigma Records) in London's Southern Studios, in 1986. This line-up recorded two more albums: 1987's Oh My Gawd!!! and 1989's Telepathic Surgery, the latter originally planned to be a 30-minute sound collage.

Drummer Nathan Roberts replaced English and guitarist Jonathan Donahue (also a member of the alternative rock band Mercury Rev) joined in 1989. In a Priest Driven Ambulance, their first album with producer Dave Fridmann, was recorded at the State University of New York in Fredonia for $5 an hour on a $10,000 budget. The album was host to a marked expansion in the band's sound and their previous experiments in tape loops and effects were given a more prominent role. During this period, Coyne made his transition to a higher, more strained vocal style akin to Neil Young, which he first used on Telepathic Surgery's "Chrome Plated Suicide" and has employed ever since.

In 1990, the band caught the attention of Warner Bros. Records and was signed promptly after a label representative witnessed a show at which the band almost burned down the venue (American Legion Hall in Norman, Oklahoma) with the use of pyrotechnics.

=== Signed to Warner Bros. (Hit to Death in the Future Head to Clouds Taste Metallic) (1991–1996) ===
In 1991, the band started recording their major label debut Hit to Death in the Future Head. The album's release was halted for nearly a year because of the use of a sample from Michael Kamen's score for the film Brazil in the track "You Have to Be Joking (Autopsy of the Devil's Brain)", which required a lengthy clearance process. After the recording of this album, Donahue left the band to concentrate on Mercury Rev, and Roberts left the band as well, citing creative differences. They were replaced by Ronald Jones and Steven Drozd, respectively.

In 1993, they released Transmissions from the Satellite Heart. This was the only studio album since In a Priest Driven Ambulance, to date, in which Dave Fridmann has not been involved. Because of the success of the album and the single "She Don't Use Jelly", the band was featured on four popular television series: Beverly Hills, 90210, Late Show with David Letterman, Charmed and Beavis and Butt-head. The success of this record led to long stints of touring, opening for bands including Red Hot Chili Peppers and Candlebox.

Clouds Taste Metallic was released to much critical fanfare in late 1995, though it did not achieve the commercial success of its predecessor. The strain of the year-long Clouds tour, added to the stress from the three years touring in support of Transmissions, was a major factor in the departure of Jones in late 1996. He was said to be suffering from a severe case of agoraphobia, although the documentary Fearless Freaks states that he left because of his growing concerns over Drozd's drug use.

In September 2014, the band paid tribute to Jones and the impact his music had on their developing sound by performing Transmissions from the Satellite Heart live at First Avenue. In February 2015, they performed Clouds Taste Metallic at the same venue. Later, in December, a 20th anniversary box set called Heady Nuggs: 20 Years After Clouds Taste Metallic 1994–1997, was released.

=== Zaireeka (1997–1999) ===
The departure of Jones and a general dissatisfaction with standard "rock" music led to the three remaining members of the group redefining the direction of the band with the experimental Zaireeka (1997), a four-CD album which is intended to be heard by playing all four CDs in four separate CD players simultaneously. The music incorporated both traditional musical elements and "found" sounds (as in musique concrète), often heavily manipulated with recording studio electronics.

As part of the development of this project, the band conducted a series of "parking lot experiments" and then later, "boombox experiments". In the parking lot experiments up to 40 volunteers were given cassettes created by the band to be played at a parking lot in their cars' stereo systems simultaneously. In the "boom box experiments" an orchestra composed of up to 40 volunteers with modified "boombox"-type tape players was "conducted" – directed to vary the volume, speed or tone of the tape they were playing (again composed by the band) – by Wayne Coyne.

Meanwhile, a series of unfortunate events (recounted in the 1999 song "The Spiderbite Song") beset the band. Drozd's arm was almost amputated needlessly because of what he claimed was a spider bite (it turned out to be abscessed as a result of Drozd's heroin use), Ivins was trapped in his car for several hours after a wheel spun off of another vehicle into his windshield, and Coyne's father died after a long battle with cancer.

=== Mainstream breakthrough (The Soft Bulletin and Yoshimi Battles the Pink Robots) (1999–2002) ===
Though their experimental endeavors received some press coverage, their real breakthrough came with the 1999 release, The Soft Bulletin. Marrying more traditional catchy melodies with synthetic strings, hypnotic, carefully manipulated beats, booming cymbals and oddball but philosophical lyrics (sung much more strongly than on earlier releases), the album quickly became one of the underground hits of the year, even widely considered to be one of the best albums of the entire decade.

Compared by many music critics to the Beach Boys' Pet Sounds because of its inclusion of harmonies and orchestrated sounds, The Soft Bulletin also featured greater use of synthesizers, drum machines, sound effects and more studio manipulation. After this album was released, Coyne stated that, "if someone was to ask me what instrument do I play, I would say the recording studio." As the band considered an attempt to recreate this complex album live solely with additional musicians to be complex and expensive, they decided to tour as a three-piece and make extensive use of pre-recorded music to fill out those parts that were not performed live by the members of the band. This led to the decision to have Drozd play primarily keyboards and guitar live instead of the drums. The band utilized video recordings and projections of Drozd playing the drums for some of the band's older songs. The band later added Kliph Scurlock on drums and percussion, with Drozd focusing on guitars, keyboards, bass (when he played bass, Ivins played keyboards), and occasional vocals. When Drozd sung, Coyne played guitars, keyboards and theremin.

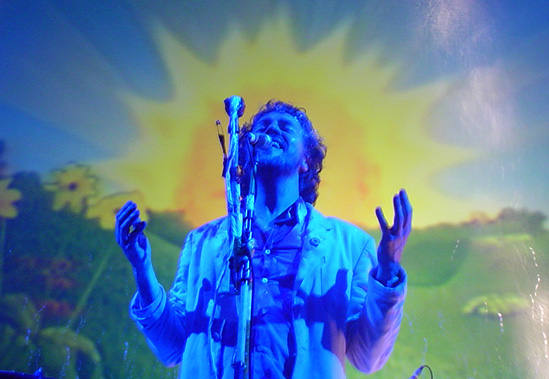
Wayne Coyne in concert in January 2004

To enhance the live experience for their audience and to accurately reproduce the sound of The Soft Bulletin live, the Lips devised the concept of the "Headphone Concert". A low-powered FM transmitter was set up at shows, and the concert was simultaneously broadcast to small Walkman-style receivers and headphones made available for free to audience members. This would, in theory, allow the audiences greater sonic clarity while still feeling the power of a full live P.A. This concept was debuted in Dallas, Texas, and at the South by Southwest conference in Austin, Texas, in March 1999, and was subsequently used on the International Music Against Brain Degeneration Revue tour. This tour featured Japanese band Cornelius, Sebadoh, Robyn Hitchcock, Sonic Boom's E.A.R. and IQU.

Three years later, in the summer of 2002, the Flaming Lips joined bands Cake and Modest Mouse on the Unlimited Sunshine Tour. They also released the full-length Yoshimi Battles the Pink Robots to much critical acclaim. Featuring guest musician Yoshimi P-We (who inspired the album's title track) and demonstrating more use of electronic instruments and computer manipulation than The Soft Bulletin, Yoshimi is widely considered to be the Flaming Lips' first critical and commercial success after nearly twenty years as a band. The final track on the album, "Approaching Pavonis Mons by Balloon (Utopia Planitia)", earned a 2003 Grammy Award for Best Rock Instrumental Performance, and the album was certified gold on April 10, 2006. In March 2007, the band revealed that they had recently teamed up with screenwriter Aaron Sorkin to produce a Broadway musical based on the album.

In January 2012, Pitchfork TV released a forty-five-minute documentary on The Soft Bulletin. The documentary featured several rare archival photos and videos along with interviews from the members, producer Dave Fridmann, and manager Scott Booker. The same year, Yoshimi Battles the Pink Robots was adapted into a musical after being in development for years after the album's release.

Both The Soft Bulletin and Yoshimi Battles the Pink Robots have been released on DVD-Audio.

Following the success of "Yoshimi", Steven Drozd completed rehab for heroin addiction. This decision was spurred by a physical altercation between Drozd and Wayne Coyne.

=== Continued success (At War with the Mystics) (2002–2006) ===
Shortly after Yoshimi and The Soft Bulletin, the Flaming Lips released two EPs in the same vein of their previous album's robotic theme which contain remixed songs from Yoshimi, Fight Test and Ego Tripping at the Gates of Hell. They also appeared on the track "Marching the Hate Machines (Into the Sun)" on the Thievery Corporation album The Cosmic Game. In 2002 they were invited to work with the Chemical Brothers. Steven Drozd performed lead vocals, while Wayne Coyne performed harmony vocals, on the single "The Golden Path", which was included on the Chemical Brothers compilation album, Singles 93-03.

In 2002, they performed as the opening act, as well as the backup band, for singer Beck on his Sea Change tour. In the summer of 2004, it was announced that the Flaming Lips would appear among the headliners on the 2004 Lollapalooza tour, alongside such artists as Sonic Youth and Morrissey; however, the tour was canceled because of lack of revenue. Also in 2004, the band recorded the song "SpongeBob and Patrick Confront the Psychic Wall of Energy" for the soundtrack of The SpongeBob SquarePants Movie. Following the concerts' cancellation, the band entered Tarbox Road Studio with producer Dave Fridmann and began work on their eleventh album, the more organic-sounding At War with the Mystics. The record, aimed to be a more guitar-based and heavier effort than recent albums, featured more politically conscious lyrics than any of their previous releases, and was released in April 2006 to a mixed yet mostly positive reception.

In 2005 the band was the subject of a documentary called Fearless Freaks, featuring appearances by other artists and celebrities such as Gibby Haynes, the White Stripes, Beck, Christina Ricci, Liz Phair, Juliette Lewis, Steve Burns, Starlight Mints, and Adam Goldberg. In that same year, the Flaming Lips contributed a version of "Bohemian Rhapsody" to the album Killer Queen: A Tribute to Queen. Also in this year, the Flaming Lips released the DVD VOID (Video Overview in Deceleration), which chronicles all of their ventures into music video that have been produced since they signed with Warner Bros in 1991. In October 2005, the Flaming Lips recorded a cover of "If I Only Had a Brain" for the soundtrack of the video game Stubbs the Zombie, which features modern rock bands covering songs from the 1950s and 1960s. Additionally, the band released one new song, "Mr. Ambulance Driver", for the soundtrack of the 2005 film Wedding Crashers (a slightly edited version of the song found its way onto the new record).

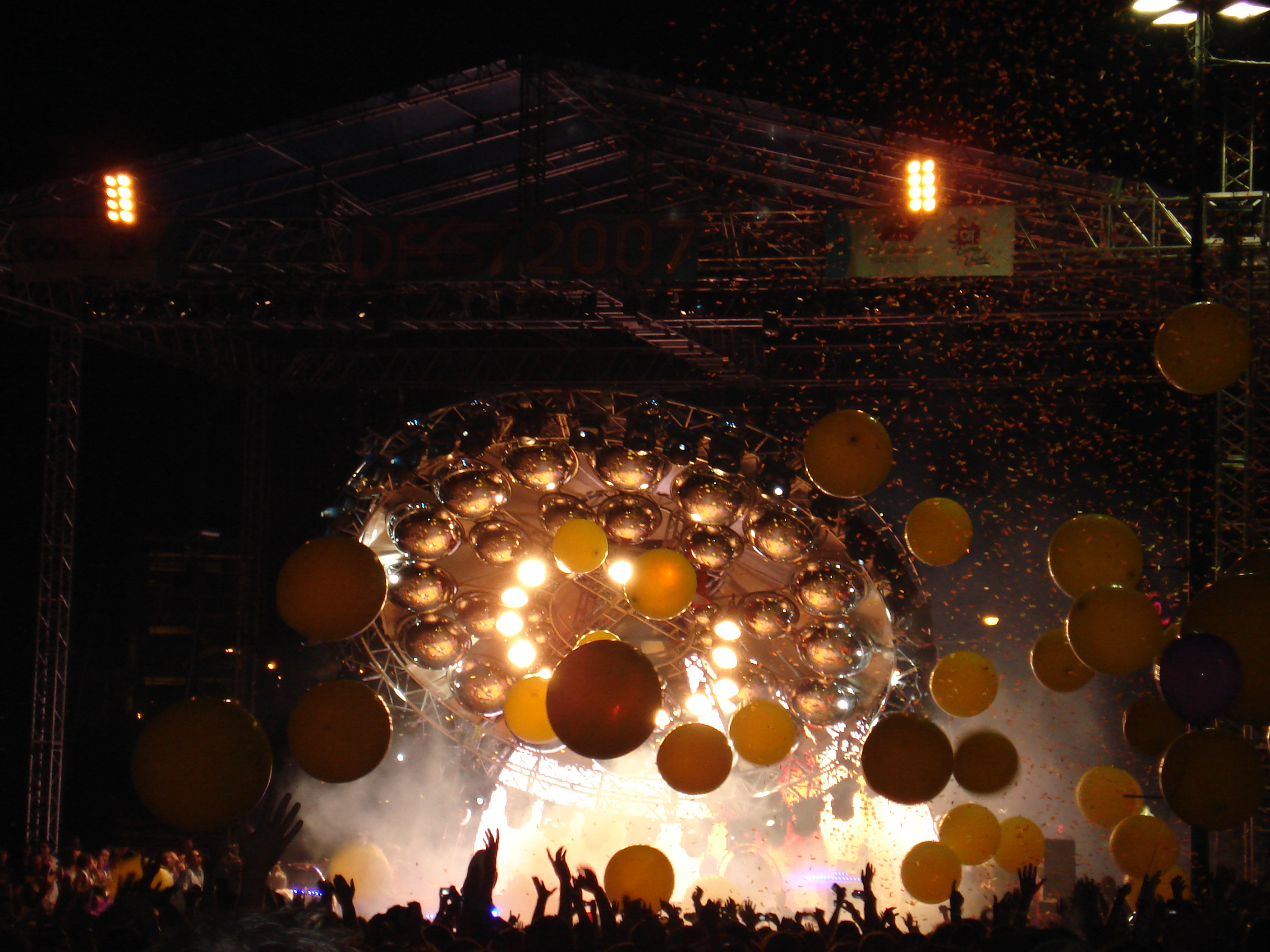
The Flaming Lips at Dfest in July 2007

The band released two singles from At War With the Mystics: "The W.A.N.D.", which was featured in a Dell commercial and which was originally put out as a download-only single in early 2006, and "The Yeah Yeah Yeah Song", which became their highest-charting single on the UK Singles Chart, peaking at No. 16. A 4-track EP, entitled It Overtakes Me, was released later in the UK that year. The only instrumental on the album, "The Wizard Turns On... The Giant Silver Flashlight and Puts on His Werewolf Moccasins", earned a 2006 Grammy Award for Best Rock Instrumental Performance, making it twice in a row the Lips have been nominated in that category and won.

Following the April 4, 2006, release of At War with the Mystics, the band began a tour to support the album in the United Kingdom, including a finale at the Royal Albert Hall and performances at the O2 Wireless Festival. At the Leeds England date of the festival, the band opened for the Who, of whom they are long standing fans.

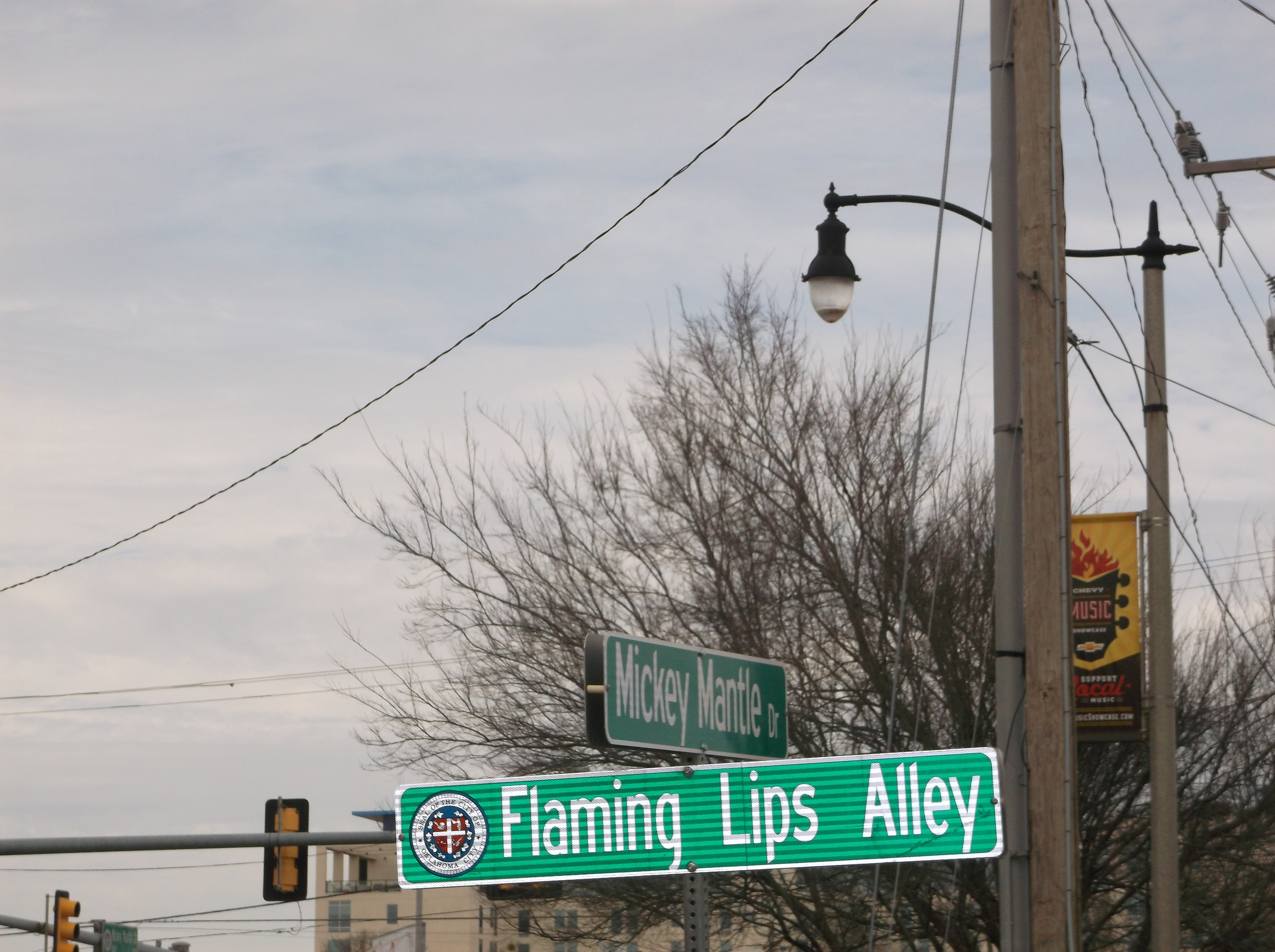
Flaming Lips Alley in Oklahoma City

The band continued to tour throughout the fall of 2006 stopping in Montreal, the Virgin Festival on the Toronto Islands, Atlantic City's House of Blues, The University of Vermont in Burlington, their hometown Oklahoma City, the Austin City Limits Music Festival in Austin, Texas, and New York City, NY as well as several other cities. The homecoming show in Oklahoma City was performed at the Zoo Amphitheater and included the unveiling of a new UFO stage prop, and would provide footage for the U.F.O.s at the Zoo concert DVD.

In November 2006 then mayor of Oklahoma City Mick Cornett proposed naming a downtown alley after the band. Vince Gill and Charlie Christian were also to be given street names by the city. Flaming Lips Alley is at the center of Oklahoma City's entertainment district, Bricktown. At the official dedication in 2007, Coyne said of Oklahoma City, "...We're on the way to becoming, I think, the fucking coolest city in America."

=== Christmas on Mars (2008) ===
In 2001, the Flaming Lips began filming a low-budget indie film entitled Christmas on Mars. Filming for the movie ended in late September 2005 and premiered on May 25, 2008, at the Sasquatch! Music Festival. The film tells the story of the first Christmas of a colony set-up on the surface of Mars and was written by Wayne Coyne, and co-directed by Wayne Coyne, Bradley Beesley and George Salisbury, with the band and their friends acting in the movie.

The band brought the film to rock festivals across America during the summer of 2008 and screened it in a large circus tent they had bought for that purpose. The film was released on DVD on November 11, 2008, along with a soundtrack written and performed by the Flaming Lips.

The band released their first live concert DVD, UFO's at the Zoo: The Legendary Concert in Oklahoma City, on August 7, 2007. The band also contributed original songs to the soundtracks of several 2007 films, including "The Supreme Being Teaches Spider-Man How to be in Love" for Spider-Man 3, "I Was Zapped by the Super Lucky Rainbow" for Good Luck Chuck, "Love the World You Find" for Mr. Magorium's Wonder Emporium, and "Maybe I'm Not the One" and "Tale of the Horny Frog" for The Heartbreak Kid.

=== Official rock song of Oklahoma (2009) ===
In March 2009 "Do You Realize??" was announced as the official rock song of Oklahoma. Ten choices were put to a public vote, and out of 21,000 votes cast nearly 51% were for "Do You Realize??" The Oklahoma Senate approved this choice unanimously. The Oklahoma House of Representatives failed to confirm the choice after Rep. Mike Reynolds, R-Oklahoma City attacked the band for its use of offensive language, and Rep. Corey Holland, R-Marlow said he had been "really offended" when Michael Ivins came to the announcement ceremony in March wearing a red T-shirt with a yellow hammer and sickle. However, that evening, Oklahoma governor Brad Henry announced he would sign an executive order naming the song the official rock song. Henry said that for more than 20 years the Flaming Lips have produced "creative, fun and provocative rock music." "The music of the Flaming Lips has earned Grammys, glowing critical acclaim and fans all over the world", the governor said. "A truly iconic rock n' roll band, they are proud ambassadors of their home state... They were clearly the people's choice, and I intend to honor that vote." However, it was revealed in 2013 that Republican governor Mary Fallin removed this designation by not renewing Brad Henry's executive order upon taking office in 2011. An alley in Oklahoma City had been named for the band in 2006.

=== Embryonic and Dark Side of the Moon (2009) ===
In 2009, the band released their twelfth studio album and first double album, Embryonic. The album, which was the band's first to open in the Billboard top 10, was widely critically acclaimed for its new direction; late in the recording the band added Derek Brown on keyboards, percussion and guitar. In December of the same year, the band released their second album of the year and thirteenth overall, The Flaming Lips and Stardeath and White Dwarfs with Henry Rollins and Peaches Doing The Dark Side of the Moon, a track-for-track cover of Pink Floyd's The Dark Side of the Moon, which was recorded with Stardeath and White Dwarfs and features guest appearances from Henry Rollins and Peaches. The album was released physically on vinyl and CD in 2010.

In 2010, the band performed "I Can Be a Frog" on the Nick Jr. television series Yo Gabba Gabba!.

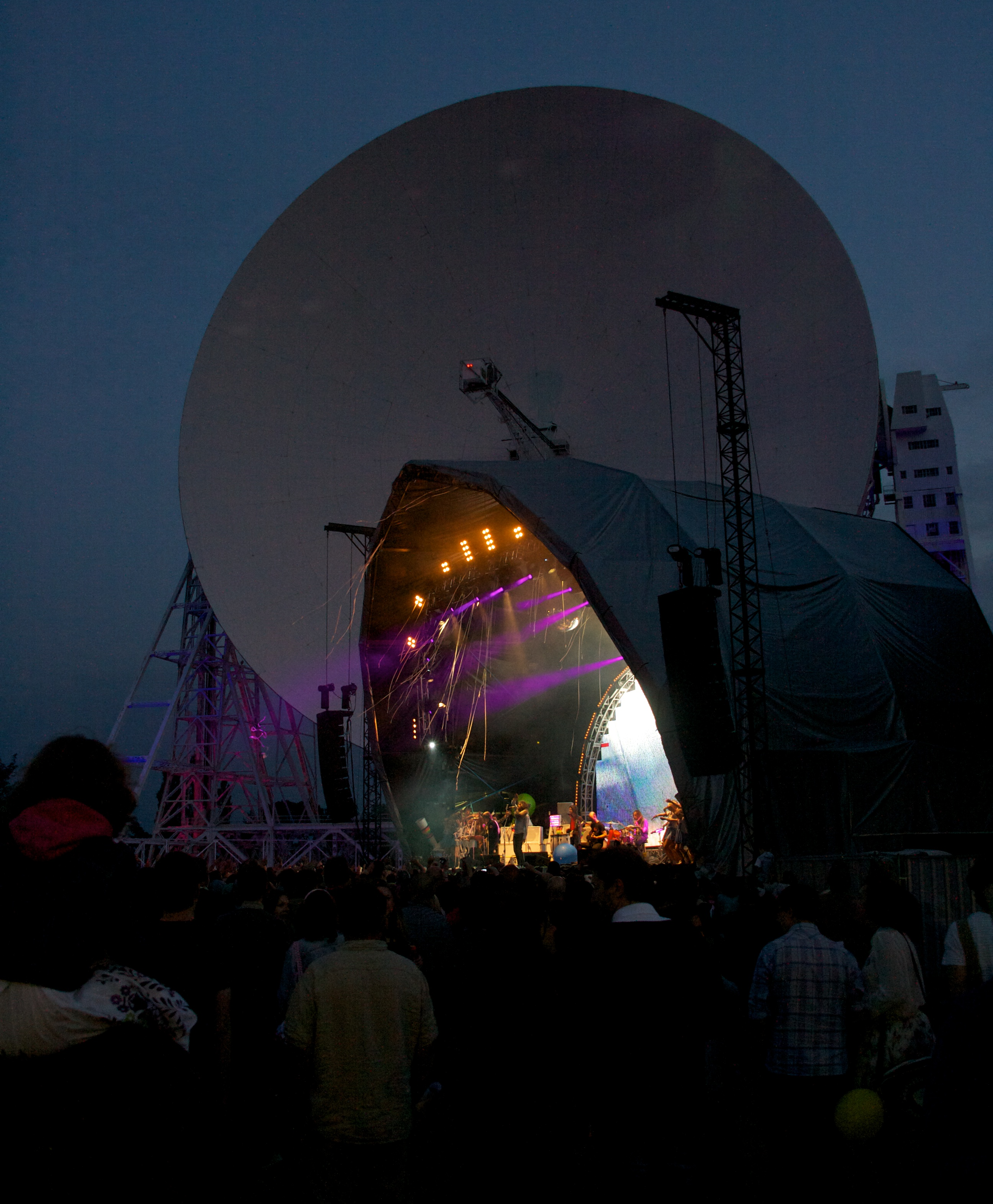
The Flaming Lips performing at Jodrell Bank Observatory

=== 2011 releases ===
In January 2011, the Lips announced their intention of releasing a new song every month of the year. In February, they released the first track titled "Two Blobs Fucking". The song exists as 12 separate pieces on YouTube and must be played simultaneously to be heard as intended.

In March 2011, the Lips released the EP The Flaming Lips with Neon Indian. In April, the band released the Gummy Song Skull EP, a seven-pound skull made of gummy bear material with a gummy brain, which contained a flashdrive with 4 songs on them. This release was extremely limited, but was soon leaked on the internet shortly after its release.

In May, the band released its second collaboration EP titled The Flaming Lips with Prefuse 73. It contains four songs and was released in a similar way to the earlier Neon Indian EP, in that the run was extremely limited and consisted of randomly colored, one of a kind discs. This EP was briefly available on the band's official website but sold out shortly after it was put up for sale.

June saw several releases by the band, the first being The Soft Bulletin: Live la Fantastique de Institution 2011, a live-in-studio recording of the band's 1999 album The Soft Bulletin which was on a flash drive embedded in a marijuana-flavored brain inside a strawberry flavored gummy skull. This was only released at the band's two night show at the Hollywood Forever Cemetery on June 14 and 15. This show was a special two-night, one morning event in which they played the entirety of The Soft Bulletin one night and a new revamped version of The Dark Side of the Moon and collaborated with Edward Sharpe and the Magnetic Zeros for a performance of "Do You Realize??" at dawn of the second day. Also included on this flash drive was a best-of compilation titled Everyone You Know Someday Will Die. It included songs from every portion of the band's career as well as a newly recorded intro. The final June release was the Gummy Song Fetus EP which consisted of three songs on a flash drive embedded in a bubblegum-flavored fetus made of gummy bear material.

In July, the band released The Flaming Lips with Lightning Bolt, a collaborative EP with experimental rock group Lightning Bolt, featuring the songs "I Wanna Get High But I Don't Want Brain Damage" and "Working at NASA on Acid". This EP was released on randomly colored vinyl as with the previous two collaborative EPs.

In late August, the band announced that it would be recording a six-hour-long song titled "I Found a Star on the Ground". This, along with two other songs, was released in September packaged with a set of spinning discs with animations on them. This release is officially called Strobo Trip. Featured in "I Found a Star on the Ground" is Sean Lennon who, with his band, opened for the Lips in early 2011. In the song Lennon reads off several lists of names of people who donated $100 to the Oklahoma City SPCA and Academy of Contemporary Music at University of Central Oklahoma. 212 names are featured in the song.

At midnight October 31, 2011, a 24-hour song was released titled "7 Skies H3". The song played live on a never-ending audio stream on a special website set up by the band and was made available for purchase as a hard drive encased in an actual human skull, limited to 13 copies.

The band's last release of 2011 was a 12" EP collaboration with Yoko Ono, entitled The Flaming Lips with Yoko Ono/Plastic Ono Band. It was sold only at the band's annual New Year's Eve show in Oklahoma City.

=== Heady Fwends, Guinness World Record and other collaborations (2012) ===
With their previous contract with Warner Bros. Records having expired in 2011, the band re-signed to Warner Bros. for the United States and to Bella Union in Europe in early 2012. The first release under these new deals was The Flaming Lips and Heady Fwends, initially released as a limited edition vinyl-only package for Record Store Day on April 21. The album features collaborations with artists such as Kesha, Nick Cave, and Erykah Badu. In an interview with American Songwriter, Coyne stated: "Since we were releasing music every month, we thought it would be a little bit boring for us each month to say 'Well here's four more Flaming Lips songs.' We just thought 'Well we'll get some of our friends, and we'll do collaborations and see what happens.'" The album later received a wider release on CD, and was digitally on June 26 in the US and July 30 in Europe.

The Flaming Lips broke Jay-Z's Guinness World Record for the most live concerts (8) in 24 hours, on June 27 and 28, 2012. The attempt was part of the O Music Awards, and was livestreamed online for the entire 24 hours. The attempt started in Memphis on the afternoon of June 27 and ended in New Orleans on the afternoon of June 28, with 20 minutes to spare. The band played with guests including Grace Potter and the Nocturnals, Neon Indian, Linear Downfall, Phantogram and HOTT MT, among others. The concerts, which were required to be at least 15 minutes long, as per Guinness rules, featured a mix of special covers, songs rarely or never performed live by the band before, and new songs from Heady Fwends.

In November 2012 the band's Lovely Sorts of Death Records released a collaborative track-by-track reinterpretation of King Crimson's In the Court of the Crimson King with Stardeath and White Dwarfs, Linear Downfall, New Fumes, and Space Face entitled Playing Hide and Seek with the Ghosts of Dawn on vinyl and on their own 'Satellite Heart Radio' website.

The band continued their working relationship with Kesha by appearing on her second studio album Warrior, co-producing and playing on the track "Past Lives" from the album's deluxe edition. Kesha and the band intended to release a collaborative studio album in 2013, entitled Lipsha; this was, however, ultimately shelved due to Kesha's then-ongoing legal issues.

=== The Terror and Miley Cyrus collaboration (2013–2015) ===
The band's next studio album, titled The Terror, was originally due for release on April 2, 2013, in the US and on April 1 in Europe, the tour began with a new member, keyboardist and guitarist Jake Ingalls. By expanding the band to a six-piece for the first time in their career, keyboardist Derek Brown moved his attention primarily to guitars and percussion. Because of a corruption while mastering the record on vinyl, the US release was delayed for two weeks, until April 16.

In anticipation of the album's release, their song, "Sun Blows Up Today", was featured in a Hyundai Super Bowl XLVII commercial. The band also released a lyric video on Video on YouTube for "Sun Blows Up Today" with animations created by long-time Lips collaborator George Salisbury. The band premiered the new album live at a free outdoor concert at SXSW on March 15, 2013.

Critical reception of the album has tended to focus on its thematic bleakness and the turgid noisiness of its instrumentation. Like the three albums often referred to as "a trilogy" accounting for the majority of the band's mainstream production over the past 15 years (consisting of The Soft Bulletin, Yoshimi Battles the Pink Robots, and At War With the Mystics), The Terror adheres to the love story/space opera narrative structure while taking a much darker approach. As noted in a review by Pitchfork, "The Terror deals in more personal turmoil– loneliness, depression, anxiety... Perhaps not coincidentally, the album was preceded by news of Coyne's separation from his partner of 25 years, Michelle, and of multi-instrumentalist Steven Drozd relapsing temporarily."

Jon Pareles of The New York Times summarized the thematic content of the album fairly succinctly when he wrote, "The lyrics [of 'The Terror'] find cosmic repercussions in a lovers' breakup; loneliness turns to contemplation of grim human compulsions and the end of the universe." Another critic goes so far as to say that the album underlines the Lacanian psychodynamics structurally inherent in the conventions of the space opera.

In November 2013 they produced and curated The Time Has Come to Shoot You Down...What a Sound, a reworking of the Stone Roses' debut album featuring New Fumes, Spaceface, Stardeath and White Dwarfs, Foxygen, Peaking Lights, Poliça and others.

In March 2014, longtime drummer and percussionist Kliph Scurlock left the band. He was replaced by two new members – drummer, percussionist, and keyboardist Matt Duckworth Kirksey, and percussionist Nicholas Ley – expanding the band again to a septet. In May, Scurlock claimed he had been fired for negative comments about Wayne Coyne's friend Christina Fallin, the daughter of Oklahoma's governor and leader of a band called Pink Pony. Fallin had recently been criticized for cultural appropriation after she wore a Native American headdress in a publicity photo. According to Scurlock, his criticism of Fallin's actions led to conflict with Coyne and his dismissal. In response, Drozd said, "[t]his Lips/Kliph bullshit has gone too far. We parted ways because of the usual band musical differences. The rest has been blown way out." Coyne went even further, calling Scurlock a "pathological liar" and stated that he never meant his defense of Fallin, which included posting a photo of his dog in a feathered headdress, to be offensive but that he was "very sorry, to anybody that is following my Instagram or my Twitter, if I offended anybody of any religion, any race, any belief system. I would say you shouldn't follow my tweets; you shouldn't even probably want to be a Flaming Lips fan because we don't really have any agenda."

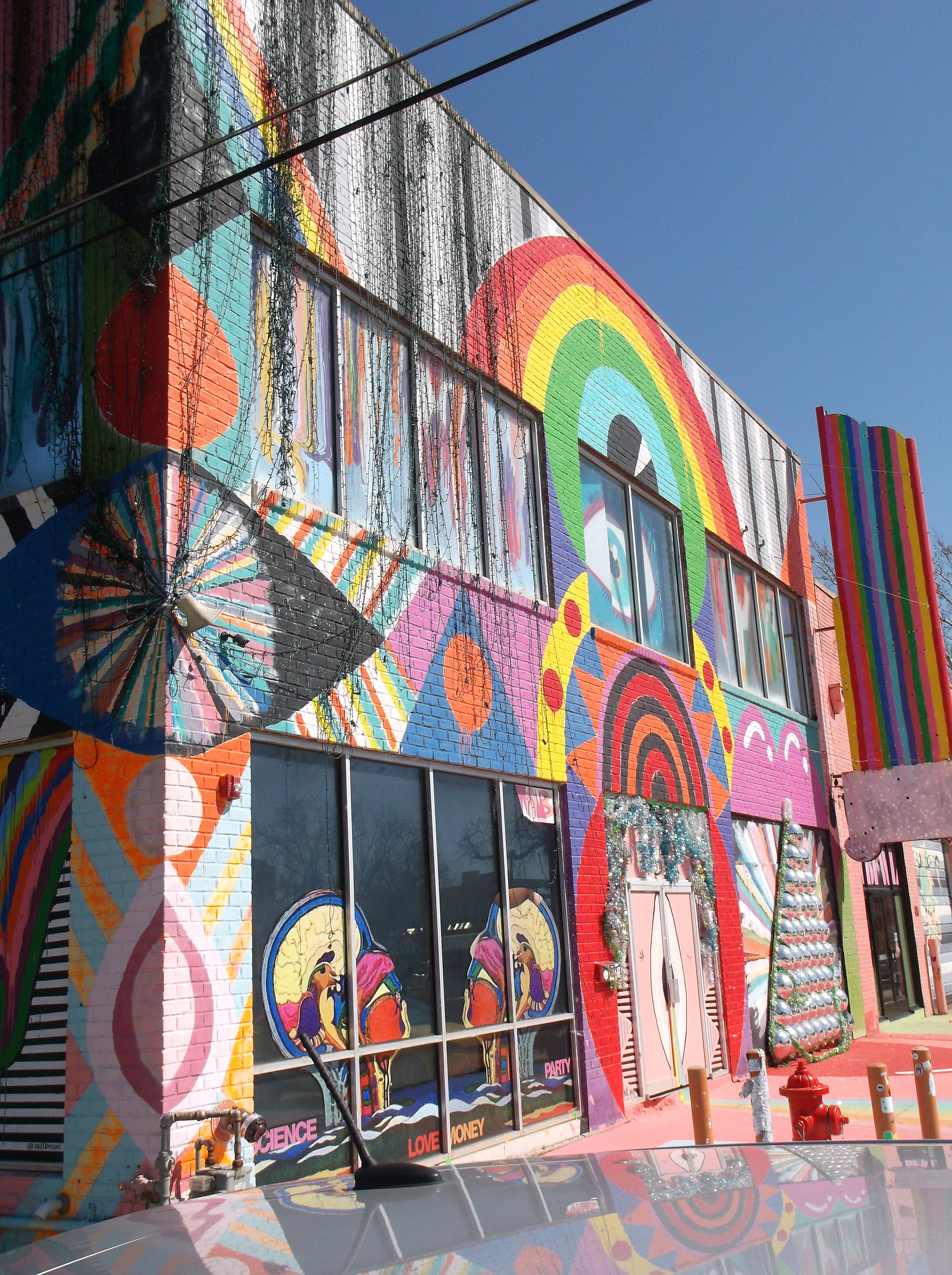
The Flaming Lips studio in Oklahoma City

On August 30, 2015, after hosting the 2015 MTV Video Music Awards, Miley Cyrus announced that Miley Cyrus & Her Dead Petz – a 23-track experimental album that Cyrus and the Flaming Lips wrote and recorded together – was available via online streaming for free. The album was described by Coyne as "a combination of Pink Floyd and Portishead," and "a slightly wiser, sadder, more true version" of Cyrus' pop music output. Music videos for the tracks "Dooo It!", "Lighter" and "BB Talk" were released on August 31, November 21 and December 11, respectively. In October 2015, Cyrus and the Flaming Lips performed "Karen Don't Be Sad" on the 41st-season premiere of Saturday Night Live, for which Cyrus was both host and musician guest. They were introduced by U.S. presidential candidate Hillary Clinton for their performance.

=== Later albums, collaborations, and classic line-up departures (2016–present) ===
According to the Tarbox Roads Studio's website, the Flaming Lips began recording a new album with Dave Fridmann on January 27, 2016. In a June interview with Danish music blog Regnsky, Wayne Coyne said that a new album would come out in January 2017, even though they had originally planned for it to be released in October 2016. Wayne Coyne later confirmed in a September interview with Consequence of Sound, that they would release a new album at the beginning of 2017. On October 20, the band confirmed the January 2017 release date for the album. The band embarked on a tour in support that was described as "rock's greatest acid punch party" with "balloons, confetti cannons and rainbow visuals". On January 13, 2017, the fourteenth Flaming Lips album Oczy Mlody was released, and featured a guest appearance by Miley Cyrus. The album charted in both the UK and US. On Record Store Day, April 22, 2017, the Flaming Lips released Onboard the International Space Station Concert for Peace, a re-recording of seven tracks from Oczy Mlody in a faux live setting.

The band's next studio album, King's Mouth, was released on April 13, 2019, for Record Store Day. Mick Jones of the Clash and Big Audio Dynamite narrated the album; Wayne Coyne said of Jones that "he's on almost every song... it really is quite unbelievable." In late 2019, Coyne and Drozd collaborated with garage rock duo Deap Vally to form a new band, Deap Lips. The project's self-titled debut album was released on March 13, 2020.

On March 23, 2020, Drozd announced that the band's sixteenth studio album, American Head, was due for release in the summer. The band officially announced the album's release date as September 11, 2020, along with the single "My Religion Is You" on June 6, 2020. The album included a duet with American country singer Kacey Musgraves, "God and the Policeman", with Musgraves also providing harmonies and backing vocals on the songs "Watching the Lightbugs Grow" and "Flowers of Neptune 6". During the COVID-19 pandemic, while unable to perform regular concerts, the band put on a unique performance in their hometown of Oklahoma City on October 12, 2020. During the show, both the band and the audience were encased in inflatable human-sized bubbles – the kind with which Coyne would often use to walk over the audience during the band's usual shows. They performed in this fashion on The Late Show with Stephen Colbert that same year, and again in 2021. In 2022, The Flaming Lips Space Bubble Film, a documentary film covering these experimental concerts, was released.

On August 16, 2021, Jake Ingalls announced on his Instagram page that he left the band on amicable terms. Also in August, Coyne commented on his Instagram that Michael Ivins was no longer in the band, officially leaving Coyne as the only original member. Micah Nelson – who had contributed guitar and vocals to American Head's opening track, "Will You Return / When You Come Down" – briefly became the band's touring bassist for live performances. He was soon replaced by Tommy McKenzie, who joined the band officially later in 2021. In November 2021, the band released Where the Viaduct Looms, a collaborative album with 13-year old Canadian musician Nell Smith. The album consisted of nine covers of songs written by Australian musician Nick Cave for his band Nick Cave & The Bad Seeds. Smith later died in a car accident on October 6, 2024, at the age of 17.

In 2024, the band, along with Dinosaur Jr., served as the opening act for Weezer during their Voyage to the Blue Planet concert tour. Following this run, Drozd stopped performing with the band. AJ Slaughter then subbed in as a touring musician, playing Drozd's parts live and also providing pedal steel. Slaughter made his debut with the band on their Australian tour in February 2025, where they performed Yoshimi Battles the Pink Robots in its entirety. Later that year, Drozd inadvertently confirmed he was no longer a member of the band by replying to a fan on Threads confirming as such, with Drozd not realising that his response could be read publicly. He later confirmed on Threads that he and Coyne had "parted ways", following his decision at the end of 2024 to "[not] tour anymore". Drozd wrote that he made the decision for him and his family, thanked the fans for their "support and concern", and ultimately "wish[ed] the Lips well". Coyne later wrote on Instagram that Drozd's stated reason for leaving was "absolutely not true". ... The reason he left is sad, and infuriating. It is his responsibility to tell everyone what happened; what he told everyone was a lie." Drozd later explained that a "personal crisis" following the Weezer tour led to his decision to quit touring, but he wanted to remain an active member of the band as a studio contributor. He and Coyne disagreed on what his role would be, which led to Drozd's departure.

On October 26, 2026, it was announced that the band had signed with Third Man Records, and would be releasing a new studio album, The Teardrop Throbs, on January 22, 2027.

== Style and influences ==
The Flaming Lips are known for their experimental approach to songwriting and composing, and have been classified as psychedelic rock, alternative rock and pop. In addition to psychedelia and bubblegum pop, the band is also known to take musical cues from noise rock.

== Members ==
Current members

- Wayne Coyne – lead vocals (1985–present), guitar, bass, keyboards, theremin (1983–present), backing vocals (1983–1985, occasional 1991–2024)
- Derek Brown – keyboards, guitar, percussion, backing vocals (2009–present) (guest appearance in 2003)
- Matt Duckworth Kirksey – drums, percussion, keyboards, backing vocals (2014–present)
- Tommy McKenzie – bass (2021–present)
- Adam Judd "AJ" Slaughter – guitar, keyboards, pedal steel (2025–present)

Former members

- Mark Coyne – lead vocals (1983–1985)
- Michael Ivins – bass, keyboards, backing vocals (1983–2021)
- Dave Kostka – drums (1983–1984)
- Richard English – drums, keyboards, backing vocals (1984–1989)
- Nathan Roberts – drums (1989–1991)
- Jonathan Donahue – guitar, backing vocals (1989–1991) (one-off reunion in 2019)
- Jon Mooneyham – guitar, backing vocals (1991)
- Steven Drozd – guitar, keyboards, bass, drums, backing and occasional lead vocals (1991–2024)
- Ronald Jones – guitar, backing vocals (1991–1996)
- Kliph Scurlock – drums, percussion (2002–2014)
- Jake Ingalls – keyboards, guitar (2013–2021)
- Nicholas Ley – percussion, drums, sampler (2014–2023)

Former touring musicians

- Ray Suen – percussion, violin, harp, keyboards (2009–2012)
- Micah Nelson – bass, keyboards, backing vocals (2021)

== Discography ==
- Hear It Is (1986)
- Oh My Gawd!!! (1987)
- Telepathic Surgery (1989)
- In a Priest Driven Ambulance (1990)
- Hit to Death in the Future Head (1992)
- Transmissions from the Satellite Heart (1993)
- Clouds Taste Metallic (1995)
- Zaireeka (1997)
- The Soft Bulletin (1999)
- Yoshimi Battles the Pink Robots (2002)
- At War with the Mystics (2006)
- Embryonic (2009)
- The Terror (2013)
- Oczy Mlody (2017)
- King's Mouth (2019)
- American Head (2020)
- The Teardrop Throbs (2027)

== Awards and nominations ==
The Flaming Lips won their first Grammy Award in 2003, for their track "Approaching Pavonis Mons by Balloon (Utopia Planitia)". To date, the band has been nominated for six Grammy Awards, and won three times.

Year	Nominated work	Award	Category	Result	Ref.
2000	The Soft Bulletin	NME Award	Best Album	Won	
2000	The Soft Bulletin	NME Award	Album of the Year	Won	
2003	"Approaching Pavonis Mons by Balloon (Utopia Planitia)"	Grammy Award	Best Rock Instrumental Performance	Won	
2004	Fight Test EP	Grammy Award	Best Alternative Music Album	Nominated	
2007	The Flaming Lips	Brit Award	Best International Group	Nominated	
2007	At War with the Mystics	Grammy Award	Best Alternative Music Album	Nominated	
2007	At War with the Mystics	Grammy Award	Best Engineered Album, Non-Classical	Won	
2007	"The Wizard Turns On..."	Grammy Award	Best Rock Instrumental Performance	Won	
2008	At War With the Mystics 5.1	Grammy Award	Grammy Award for Best Surround Sound Album	Nominated	
2018	"Tomorrow Is" for SpongeBob SquarePants: The Broadway Musical	Outer Critics Circle Award	Outstanding New Score	Won	
2018	"Tomorrow Is" for SpongeBob SquarePants: The Broadway Musical	Tony Award	Best Original Score	Nominated	
