= Yeah, I Know It's a Drag... But Wastin' Pigs Is Still Radical =

EP by The Flaming Lips
- Released: October 1991
- Recorded: 1991
- Genre: Alternative rock
- Label: Warner Bros.
- Producer: The Flaming Lips and Dave Fridmann

The Flaming Lips EP chronology
The Flaming Lips (1984)	Yeah, I Know It's a Drag... But Wastin' Pigs Is Still Radical (1991)	Due to High Expectations... The Flaming Lips Are Providing Needles for Your Balloons (1994)

Professional ratings
Review scores
Source	Rating
Allmusic	3/5 stars

Yeah, I Know It's a Drag... But Wastin' Pigs Is Still Radical is an EP by The Flaming Lips, released on Warner Bros. Records in 1991.

== Track listing ==
No.	Title	Length
1.	"Talkin' 'Bout the Smiling Deathporn Immortality Blues (Everyone Wants to Live Forever)"	3:50
2.	"All That Jazz/Happy Death Men" (Echo & the Bunnymen cover)	5:34
3.	"Jets (Cupid's Kiss vs. The Psyche of Death)"	4:22
