= Kliph Scurlock =

American drummer

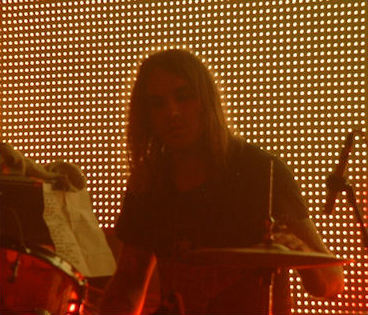
- Kliph Scurlock at a concert

Background information
- Born: Clifton Thomas Scurlock; June 16, 1973 (age 52)
- Origin: Topeka, Kansas, U.S.
- Genres: Alternative rock
- Occupation: Musician
- Instruments: Drums; percussion
- Years active: 1991–present

Clifton Thomas "Kliph" Scurlock (born June 16, 1973) is an American musician. He was the drummer and percussionist for alternative rock band The Flaming Lips from 2002 to 2014.

== Early life ==
Scurlock was born in Topeka, Kansas, the son of Roger W. Scurlock (born ca. 1946) and Linda Louise Rokey (September 6, 1944 – July 17, 1981). His love of music was inspired by his mother. Linda Scurlock was in the first all-female mariachi band, Mariachi Estrella. She also gave him his first Beatles album, which was on 8-track tape.

When he was eight years old, his mother died in the Hyatt Regency walkway collapse in Kansas City, where she was performing with Mariachi Estrella. After her death, Scurlock went to live with his father. He began playing in the school band and marching band in 6th grade. When he was in 11th grade, he began spelling his name K-l-i-p-h to distinguish himself from another student named Cliff. The spelling variant stuck and family and friends began spelling it that way.

== Career ==
At age 16, Scurlock bought a Ringo Starr series 1964 Ludwig Silver Sparkle Drum Set. Within two weeks, he was in his first band—a cover band whose first show was at a Topeka strip club named the Golden Horseshoe. The following year, he joined his first "real" band, Slackjaw, based out of Lawrence. When he was 18, he moved there. He quit Slackjaw in 1993 and played in a lot of other bands, including Kill Creek, Sleeztax, Panel Donor, the Rohypnol Rangers, and Contortion Horse.

In March 1999, Scurlock was hired as a roadie for the Flaming Lips while the band was on tour to promote their album The Soft Bulletin. He remained with them on their next tour while they served as Beck's backing band in 2002. Scurlock was chosen to play the drums on that tour, to enable another band member, multi-instrumentalist Steven Drozd, to play lead guitar. Scurlock then became the Flaming Lips' touring drummer so Drozd could continue playing guitar and keyboards live. Subsequently, there was a distinction between the Flaming Lips (Wayne Coyne, Michael Ivins, Drozd) and the Flaming Lips Live (which included Scurlock). However, upon the release of the Flaming Lips album Embryonic in October 2009, Scurlock was formally recognized in the liner notes as a full-fledged member of the band. In addition to the Embryonic album, he is credited on the 2003 Fight Test EP

In March 2014, Scurlock left the band. In May, Scurlock said that he had been fired for negative comments about Wayne Coyne's friend Christina Fallin, the daughter of Oklahoma's governor and leader of a band called Pink Pony. Fallin had recently been criticized for cultural appropriation after she wore a Native American headdress in a publicity photo. According to Scurlock, his criticism of Fallin's actions led to conflict with Coyne and his dismissal. In response, Drozd said, "[t]his Lips/Kliph bullshit has gone too far. We parted ways because of the usual band musical differences. The rest has been blown way out."

Scurlock toured alongside Super Furry Animals frontman Gruff Rhys, as part of Rhys's backing band on the 2014-15 American Interior tour. He also has played with the band Gulp, fronted by SFA bassist Guto Pryce, and was part of SFA's stage crew during their May 2015 gigs. Scurlock now resides in Cardiff, Wales and regularly collaborates with Welsh musicians such as Gwenno.
