= Wayne Coyne =

American musician (born 1961)

- Coyne performing in 2017

Background information
- Born: Wayne Michael Coyne; January 13, 1961 (age 65); Pittsburgh, Pennsylvania, United States
- Origin: Oklahoma City, Oklahoma, United States
- Genres: Neo-psychedelia; psychedelic rock; alternative rock; experimental rock
- Occupations: Singer; musician; songwriter
- Instruments: Vocals; guitar; keyboards; bass; theremin; percussion
- Years active: 1983–present
- Label: Warner
- Member of: The Flaming Lips; Electric Würms

Signature
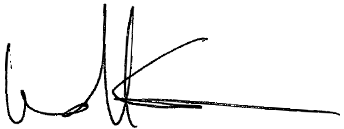

Wayne Michael Coyne (born January 13, 1961) is an American musician. He is the founder, lead vocalist, main songwriter, and only constant member of the psychedelic rock band the Flaming Lips.

== Early life ==
Coyne was born in Pittsburgh, Pennsylvania, United States, the son of Thomas Coyne and Dolores "Dolly" Jackson. The fifth of six children of an Irish Catholic family, Coyne moved with his family from Pittsburgh's Troy Hill neighborhood to Oklahoma in early 1961. Coyne grew up in Oklahoma City. Coyne preferred listening to music and playing pickup football. He, his sister, and his brothers dubbed themselves "The Fearless Freaks" for their brutal backyard football games. Tommy Coyne, Wayne's older brother, described the games as a "semi-civilized gang fight."

In 1977, while in high school, Coyne began working as a fry cook for a Long John Silver's restaurant in Oklahoma City. During his second year of employment, there was a rash of robberies in Oklahoma City. The restaurant was robbed and Coyne and other employees were held at gunpoint and forced to lie on the ground. Coyne was certain he was going to die. The assistant manager could not open the restaurant's safe, however, and the robbers eventually fled the scene. Coyne believes "this is really how you die...one minute you're just cooking up someone's order of French fries and the next minute you're laying on the floor and they blow your brains out. There's no music, there's no significance, it's just random." Coyne continued working at Long John Silver's until 1990.

== With the Flaming Lips ==
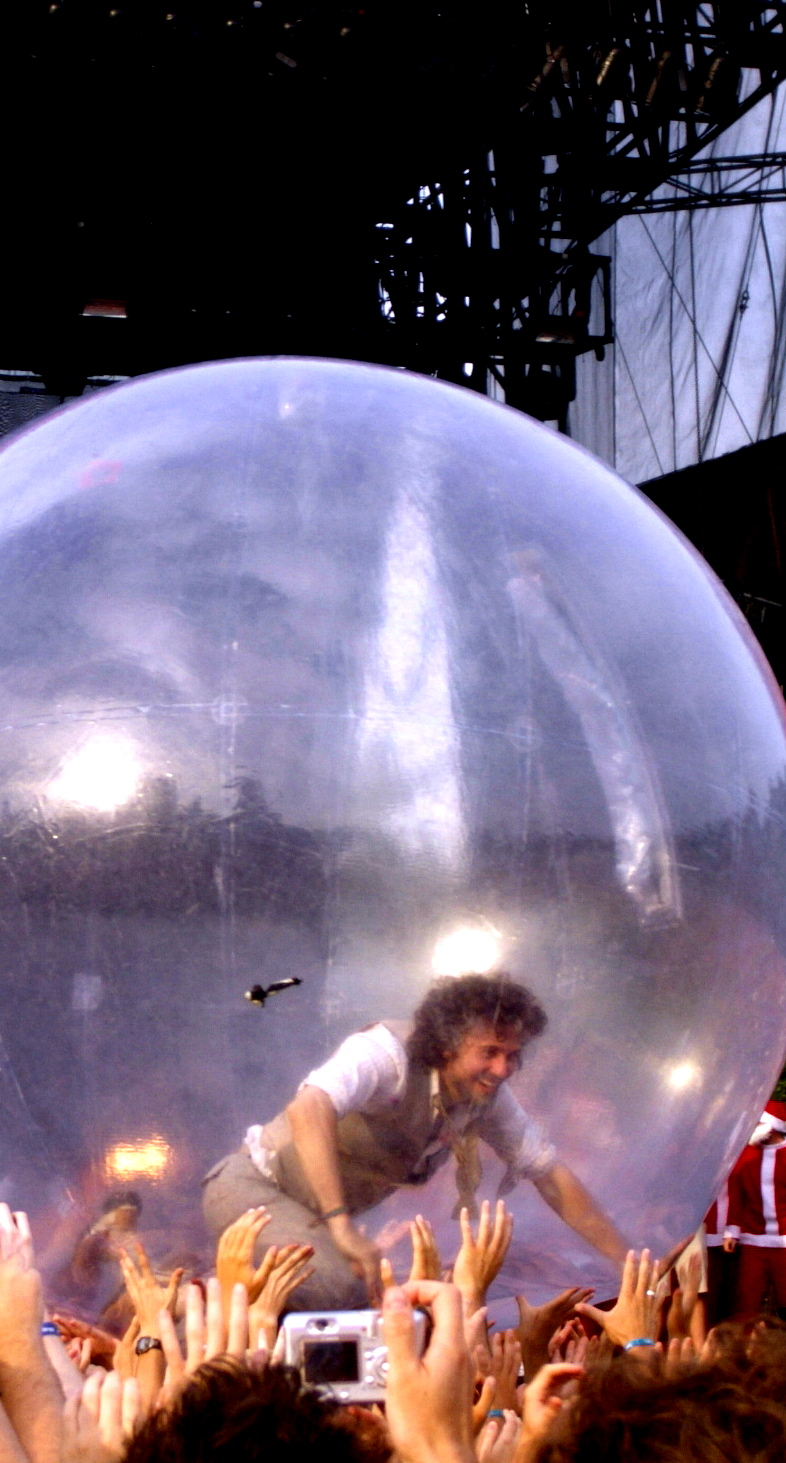
Coyne at Lollapalooza, 2006 Grant Park, Chicago

Coyne formed the Flaming Lips in 1983 with brother Mark singing lead, Michael Ivins on bass guitar, and Richard English on drums. Mark later left the band and Wayne assumed vocal duties. Wayne is the only constant member of the band since its founding. According to allmusic.com Coyne "became the primary singer and songwriter" of the band. According to an article in the September 16th, 1993 issue of Rolling Stone Mark and Wayne Coyne came up with the name "The Flaming Lips" as a reference to a rumor of a high school classmate who contracted genital herpes after receiving cunnilingus from a partner with active cold sores. Wayne remarked on this unsubstantiated claim:

When Mark and I were in, I think it was Junior Year in High School, there was a rumor about this girl who got herpes from this guy at a party. He went down on her with a cold sore. I don't think we knew the girl, and I'm not sure if she even existed, you know how kids just spread bullshit. But when we were thinking of band names one night over a pack of Schlitz and some left-handed cigarettes and remembered how we joked that they both had "Flaming Lips" and it just stuck.

During large-crowd festival performances, Coyne makes his entrance by descending from an alien mother ship (a nod to Parliament-Funkadelic) in a bubble and floats across the audience. Coyne has also been known to pour fake blood down his face via a hidden tube during live shows. Coyne does this to pay homage to a famous picture of Miles Davis who, after a performance, had blood on his suit because a police officer had beaten him during the show.

Flaming Lips concerts also feature confetti cannons, lasers, laser pointers, images projected on to a screen, dozens of large balloons, a stage filled with dancers dressed as aliens, yetis, the gloves etc. Before performing, Coyne can be seen helping the stage crew. Their performances have been likened to psychedelic experiences rather than simply music shows, a tradition that goes back to the band's formation.

== Experimental art ==
In 1996 and 1997, Coyne developed "The Parking Lot Experiments," where forty different tapes were distributed. The band instructed forty cars to start the tapes at the same time, resulting in a surround sound. Over 1,000 people gathered in a parking lot for this experiment.

The parking lot experiments led to the experimental album Zaireeka, which is made up of four stereo tracks, each on four different CDs. The four CDs are meant to be played simultaneously in order to hear the complete tracks. Coyne believes Zaireeka embraces "...a kind of anarchy in art. It was like an art happening – you have to bring four sound systems together. Sometimes you get great synchronicity; other times, it sounds haphazard. You get to hear music in a whole new way."

At the New Year's Eve Freakout in Oklahoma City on January 1, 2010, Coyne instructed the audience to set their cell phone alarms for 12:55 a.m. When the alarms went off, the alarm sounds were drowned out by cheering. Coyne remarked that "someone has a loud fucking iPhone."

In October 2010, Coyne created a screen print using his own blood. The poster commemorated The Flaming Lips' appearance at the Austin City Limits Music Festival. It has a picture of a skull drawn in a Wes Wilson style. Coyne printed it using his blood collected in a vial. The frontman stated, "We thought it would be silly to use chicken blood or something, they don't need to sacrifice their vital fluids any more than I need to"

In February 2017, Coyne debuted an art exhibit at the Waterloo Center for the Arts in Waterloo, Iowa called "Works by Wayne Coyne". The exhibit featured The King's Mouth, a 14-minute light attraction to enter and enjoy.

== Directorial debut ==
Coyne began making his science fiction film, Christmas on Mars, in 2001. It was a low budget project and principal photography was shot on a set in his backyard. The different parts of the spaceship set were built by Coyne.

The film tells the story of the first Christmas on a colonized Mars. In the film, Coyne plays a super-being who is curious about a baby being born on Mars.

Christmas on Mars was shown for the first time at the Sasquatch! Music Festival in a circus tent. The Flaming Lips took the tent on tour, showing the movie after each performance. "The concept was to come up with another one of those midnight movies, like The Rocky Horror Picture Show that I went to see as a teenager, all toked up, before the days of cable."

== Other projects and appearances ==
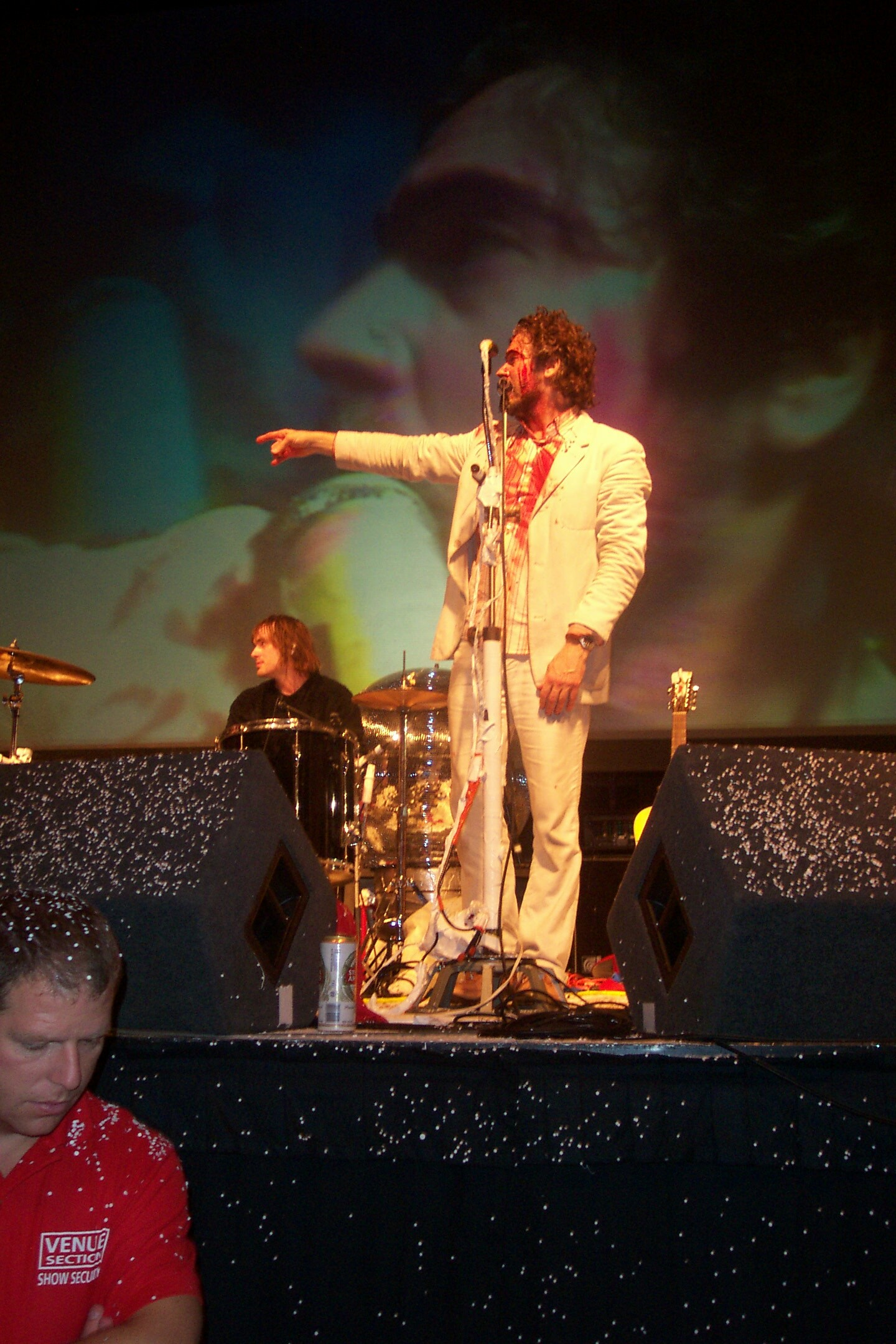
Wayne Coyne in Brighton Centre, UK in 2003

- Bradley Beesley directed a 2005 film about Coyne and the Flaming Lips, The Fearless Freaks, which features much footage of Coyne's early life, as well as his narration about his experiences in the band.
- In 2003, Coyne provided vocals on "The Golden Path" by The Chemical Brothers. This track was released on the Singles 93-03 album (CD1, Track 13).
- In 2003, Coyne and Flaming Lips-mate Steven Drozd wrote and performed the James Bond-esque theme song of the Looney Tunes show Duck Dodgers, based on the iconic Daffy Duck cartoon Duck Dodgers of the 24½th Century. The song was sung by Welsh singer Tom Jones.
- In 2005, Coyne recorded "Marching the Hate Machines (Into the Sun)" with the electronic-duo Thievery Corporation on their album The Cosmic Game.
- On May 24, 2006, a video of Coyne was shown at the graduation ceremony at his old high school, the Classen School of Advanced Studies in Oklahoma City, Oklahoma. In the video he spoke of not being a high school graduate, working at Long John Silver's, selling marijuana out of his apartment, and the value of life experience.
- In 2006, Coyne appeared in a Swedish music program called 'Musikministeriet' ('The Ministry of Music'). He was featured in every episode, beginning and ending each one with a few eloquent words about that particular episode's theme, and his opinions about it.
- On January 1, 2007, Coyne appeared in Pasadena, California's annual Rose Parade on the "Oklahoma Rising" float with members of the Flaming Lips, and other celebrities who claim Oklahoma as their native state, including astronaut John Herrington, 2006 Miss America Jennifer Berry, as well as the creator of "Desperate Housewives", Marc Cherry. It was the state's centennial birthday.
- Coyne and The Flaming Lips guest starred in an episode of the television show Charmed.
- Coyne and The Flaming Lips appeared on an episode of Beverly Hills, 90210, playing at the Peach Pit. They sometimes show the clip at live concerts.
- Coyne sings on the opening track, "Revenge", of Danger Mouse and Sparklehorse's album with David Lynch, "Dark Night of the Soul".
- Coyne sings on the track "Colossal Gray Sunshine" of Faultline's album Your Love Means Everything.
- Coyne contributed several tracks to Kesha's second album, Warrior, including tracks titled "You Control My Heart" and "Past Life." They also worked on Lipsha.
- On August 16, 2012, Coyne appeared on The Colbert Report for an interview by Stephen Colbert and a performance with the Flaming Lips on the deck of the USS Intrepid as part of "Stephest Colbchella '012: Rocktaugustfest".
- On March 12, 2013, Coyne appeared on a Virgin Mobile advertisement. In the commercial Coyne attempts to brainwash the viewer into switching mobile phone plans.
- Coyne appears on the track "The Perfect Life" on Moby's album Innocents released in October 2013.
- Coyne wrote and illustrated the comic book "The Sun is Sick", which was published in April 2013.
- Coyne and the Flaming Lips appeared in season 6, episode 1 ("Pickathon") of the series "Portlandia", which centered around a large, outdoor music festival.
- In 2022, Coyne co-directed a documentary about the band's 2021 COVID-19-era concerts featuring the bands and audience encased in 'space bubbles' entitled The Flaming Lips Space Bubble Film.
- In 2026, Coyne released a graphic novel adaptation of Yoshimi Battles the Pink Robots. Entitled Yoshimi Battles the Pink Robots: The Original Story by The Flaming Lips, it took Coyne four years to write, illustrate, and color the book.

== Personal life ==
Coyne lives on a compound of four houses in the same neighborhood in which he grew up. Each Halloween, Coyne dresses up to scare trick-or-treaters who come to his home. He feels that it is good to scare children, because when they grow older, there are things "that are horribly scary . . . you can't just run away from them or turn on a light and it runs away." Though an atheist, Coyne states: "I wish I did believe in God. It would be a great relief to think, 'God'll take care of it. God'll put gas in the car tomorrow.'"

In 2012 Coyne separated from his common-law wife, J. Michelle Martin-Coyne. In September 2013, Martin-Coyne filed for divorce on the grounds of "irreconcilable incompatibility." The two had no children together and disagree on how long they lived together (Martin-Coyne claiming since 1989, Coyne since 2004).

Coyne began dating Katy Weaver in 2012. The two got engaged in September 2018 and in November 2018 announced they were expecting their first child together. They got married January 5, 2019, in downtown Oklahoma City. In June 2019, Coyne and Weaver welcomed their first child, a son, named Bloom Bobby Coyne. On March 13, 2022, the Coynes announced the arrival of a second son named Rex Roses Coyne.
