= The Flaming Lips discography =

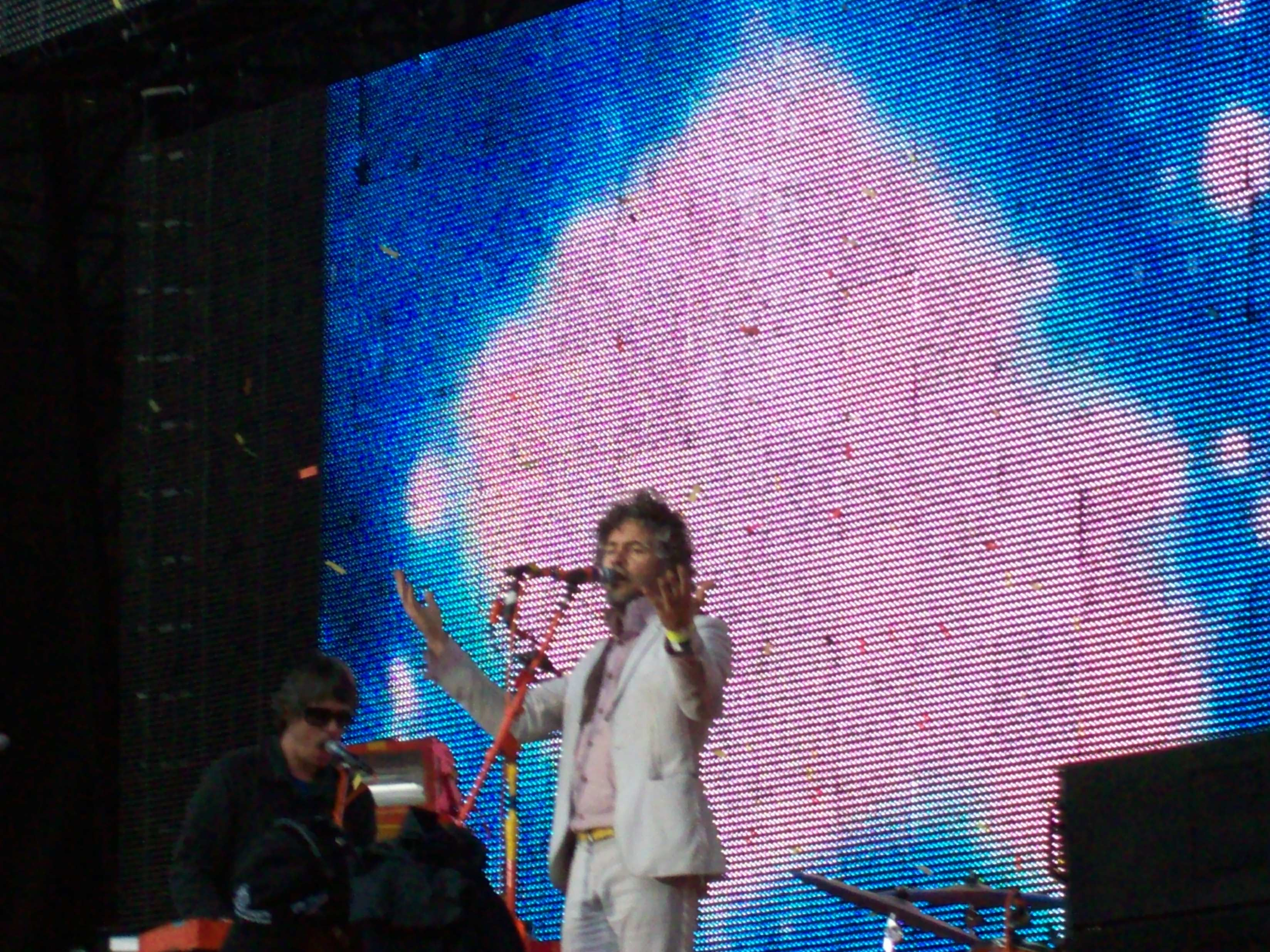
- The Flaming Lips performing in Mexico City
- Studio albums: 16
- Extended plays: 18
- Compilation albums: 10
- Singles: 16
- Video albums: 4

The discography of the Flaming Lips, an American rock band formed in 1983, consists of 16 studio albums (a 17th announced), 18 extended plays, 15 singles, 10 compilation albums, four video albums and an array of various other appearances.

== Studio albums ==
Title	Album details	Peak chart positions							Certifications (sales thresholds)
Title	Album details	US	US Heat.	AUS	BEL	JPN	NZ	UK	Certifications (sales thresholds)
Hear It Is	Released: August 22, 1986; Labels: Restless, Enigma/Pink Dust	—	—	—	—	—	—	—	
Oh My Gawd!!!	Released: November 1, 1987; Labels: Restless, Enigma	—	—	—	—	—	—	—	
Telepathic Surgery	Released: February 17, 1989; Labels: Restless, Enigma	—	—	—	—	—	—	—	
In a Priest Driven Ambulance	Released: September 12, 1990; Labels: Restless, City Slang	—	—	—	—	—	—	—	
Hit to Death in the Future Head	Released: August 11, 1992; Label: Warner Bros.	—	—	—	—	—	—	—	
Transmissions from the Satellite Heart	Released: June 22, 1993; Label: Warner Bros.	108	1	—	—	—	—	—	
Clouds Taste Metallic	Released: September 19, 1995; Label: Warner Bros.	—	16	—	—	—	—	—	
Zaireeka	Released: October 28, 1997; Label: Warner Bros.	—	—	N/R	N/R	N/R	N/R	N/R	
The Soft Bulletin	Released: June 22, 1999; Label: Warner Bros.	—	12	—	—	—	—	39	BPI: Gold
Yoshimi Battles the Pink Robots	Released: July 16, 2002; Label: Warner Bros.	50	—	62	—	80	47	13	RIAA: Gold; ARIA: Gold; BPI: Platinum
At War with the Mystics	Released: April 4, 2006; Label: Warner Bros.	11	—	20	47	50	36	6	BPI: Gold
Once Beyond Hopelessness	Released: November 11, 2008; Label: Warner Bros.	—	—	—	—	—	—	—	
Embryonic	Released: October 13, 2009; Label: Warner Bros.	8	—	43	50	61	—	43	
The Flaming Lips and Stardeath and White Dwarfs with Henry Rollins and Peaches Doing The Dark Side of the Moon	Released: December 22, 2009; Label: Warner Bros.	157	—	—	—	—	—	—	
The Flaming Lips and Heady Fwends	Released: April 21, 2012; Labels: Warner Bros./Lovely Sorts of Death, Bella Union	139	—	—	199	—	—	99	
The Terror	Released: April 1, 2013; Labels: Warner Bros./Lovely Sorts of Death, Bella Union	21	—	100	39	50	—	42	
The Time Has Come to Shoot You Down... What a Sound	Released: November 29, 2013; Label: Lovely Sorts of Death	—	—	—	—	—	—	—	
With a Little Help from My Fwends	Released: October 28, 2014; Label: Warner Bros.	58	—	—	108	—	—	84	
Atlas Eets Christmas	Released: November 28, 2014; Labels:	—	—	—	—	—	—	—	
Oczy Mlody	Released: January 13, 2017; Labels: Warner Bros./Bella Union	62	—	—	43	—	—	38	
King's Mouth	Released: July 19, 2019; Labels: Warner Bros./Bella Union	—	—	—	174	—	—	78	
American Head	Released: September 11, 2020; Labels: Warner Bros./Bella Union	172	—	—	17	—	—	17	
The Teardrop Throbs	Scheduled release: January 22, 2027; Labels: Third Man Records	—	—	—	—	—	—	—	
"—" denotes releases that did not chart or were not released in that territory.

== Compilations ==
Title	Album details
A Collection of Songs Representing an Enthusiasm for Recording...By Amateurs	Released: September 29, 1998; Labels: Restless
Finally the Punk Rockers Are Taking Acid	Released: September 17, 2002; Labels: Restless, Rykodisc
Shambolic Birth and Early Life Of	Released: September 17, 2002; Labels: Restless, Rykodisc
The Day They Shot a Hole in the Jesus Egg	Released: October 1, 2002; Labels: Restless, Rykodisc
Late Night Tales: The Flaming Lips	Released: March 14, 2005; Label: Azuli
20 Years of Weird: Flaming Lips 1986–2006	Released: October 16, 2006; Label: Warner Bros.
iTunes Originals – The Flaming Lips	Released: July 3, 2007
Heady Nuggs: The First Five Warner Bros. Records 1992–2002	Released: April 16, 2011; Label: Warner Bros.
Heady Nuggs: 20 Years After Clouds Taste Metallic 1994–1997	Released: November 27, 2015
Greatest Hits, Vol. 1	Released: June 1, 2018; Label: Warner Bros.
Scratching the Door: The First Recordings of the Flaming Lips	Released: April 20, 2018; Label: Rhino Entertainment Company
Seeing the Unseeable: The Complete Studio Recordings of the Flaming Lips 1986–1990	Released: June 29, 2018; Label: Rhino Entertainment Company
The Soft Bulletin Companion	Released: 2021

== Extended plays ==
Title	EP details	Notes
The Flaming Lips	Released: 1984; Labels: Lovely Sorts of Death, Restless, Enigma/Pink Dust	
Unconsciously Screamin'	Released: 1990; Labels: Atavistic, City Slang	CD single containing the non-album tracks "Ma, I Didn't Notice", "Lucifer Rising", and "Let Me Be It"
Yeah, I Know It's a Drag... But Wastin' Pigs Is Still Radical	Released: October 31, 1991; Label: Warner Bros.	
Due to High Expectations... the Flaming Lips Are Providing Needles for Your Balloons	Released: July 12, 1994; Label: Warner Bros.	Peaked at No. 182 on the US Billboard 200
The Southern Oklahoma Cosmic Trigger Contest	Released: March 10, 2001; Label: Independent	
Fight Test	Released: April 22, 2003; Label: Warner Bros.	CD single containing non-album tracks "The Strange Design of Conscience" and "Thank You Jack White (for the Fiber-Optic Jesus That You Gave Me)" Peaked at No. 93 on the US Billboard 200
Ego Tripping at the Gates of Hell	Released: November 18, 2003; Label: Warner Bros.	CD single non-album tracks "Assassination of the Sun", "I'm a Fly in a Sunbeam (Following the Funeral Procession of a Stranger)", "Sunship Balloons", and "A Change at Christmas (Say It Isn't So)"
Yoshimi Wins! (Live Radio Sessions)	Released: November 15, 2005; Label: Warner Bros.	
It Overtakes Me	Released: November 13, 2006; Label: Warner Bros.	CD single containing non-album track "I'm Afraid of Dying... Aren't You?"
Paranoia and Peace (with Tame Impala)	Released: October 29, 2013; Label: Lovely Sorts of Death	Split vinyl EP sold at Halloween concerts, with the Flaming Lips covering Tame Impala and Tame Impala covering the Flaming Lips.
Peace Sword	Released: October 29, 2013; Label: Warner Bros.	The title track, "Peace Sword (Open Your Heart)", was written for the film Ender's Game. The other tracks on the EP, however, were not accepted by the producers.

== Singles ==
Title	Year	Peak chart positions				Certifications	Album
Title	Year	US	US Alt.	AUS	UK	Certifications	Album
"Drug Machine" (Note: Renamed to Drug Machine in Heaven for the album.)	1989	—	—	—	—		Telepathic Surgery
"Unconsciously Screamin'"	1990	—	—	—	—		In a Priest Driven Ambulance
"Everyone Wants to Live Forever"	1992	—	—	—	—		Hit to Death in the Future Head
"Frogs"	1992	—	—	—	—		Hit to Death in the Future Head
"Ballrooms Of Mars" / "Sudden Death"	1992	—	—	—	—		Split single with Mr. Bungle
"She Don't Use Jelly"	1993	55	9	25	94		Transmissions from the Satellite Heart
"Turn It On"	1995	—	—	—	—		Transmissions from the Satellite Heart
"Bad Days" (Note: b/w "Girl with Hair Like an Explosion" (non-album track))	1995	—	—	—	77		Clouds Taste Metallic
"This Here Giraffe"	1996	—	—	—	72		Clouds Taste Metallic
"Brainville"	1996	—	—	—	—		Clouds Taste Metallic
"Race for the Prize"	1999	—	—	—	39		The Soft Bulletin
"Waitin' for a Superman"	1999	—	—	—	73		The Soft Bulletin
"Do You Realize??"	2002	—	—	—	32	RIAA: Gold	Yoshimi Battles the Pink Robots
"Yoshimi Battles the Pink Robots, Pt. 1"	2003	—	—	—	18		Yoshimi Battles the Pink Robots
"Fight Test"	2003	—	—	—	28		Yoshimi Battles the Pink Robots
"Ego Tripping at the Gates of Hell"	2003	—	—	—	—	—	Yoshimi Battles the Pink Robots
"The W.A.N.D. (The Will Always Negates Defeat)"	2006	108	—	—	41		At War with the Mystics
"The Yeah Yeah Yeah Song (With All Your Power)"	2006	—	—	79	16		At War with the Mystics
"It Overtakes Me"	2006	—	—	—	—	155	At War with the Mystics
"Love the World You Find"	2007	—	—	—	—		Mr. Magorium's Wonder Emporium
"Look... The Sun is Rising"	2013	—	—	—	—		The Terror
"Sun Blows Up Today"	2013	—	—	—	—		The Terror
"Space Oddity"	2016	—	—	—	—		non-album single
"The Castle"	2016	—	—	—	—		Oczy Mlody
"How??"	2016	—	—	—	—		Oczy Mlody
"Sunrise (Eyes of the Young)"	2016	—	—	—	—		Oczy Mlody
"We a Famly"	2017	—	—	—	—		Oczy Mlody
"Nigdy Nie (Never No)"	2017	—	—	—	—		Oczy Mlody
"Flowers of Neptune 6"	2020	—	—	—	—		American Head
"My Religion Is You"	2020	—	—	—	—		American Head
"Dinosaurs on the Mountain"	2020	—	—	—	—		American Head
"You n Me Sellin' Weed"	2020	—	—	—	—		American Head
"Will You Return / When You Come Down"	2020	—	—	—	—		American Head
"Mother Please Don't Be Sad"	2020	—	—	—	—		American Head
"God Will Control the Werewolves"	2026	—	—	—	—		The Teardrop Throbs
"—" denotes releases that did not chart or were not released in that territory.

== The Flaming Lips 2011 series ==
Title	Month	Details	Type	Notes
The Flaming Lips 2011 #1: Two Blobs Fucking	February	Released: February 14, 2011; Labels: Warner Bros./Lovely Sorts of Death	music video	Released as a 12-piece track on YouTube, each accompanied by its own respective video. Similar to their Zaireeka album, it is meant to be played simultaneously on 12 separate smartphones.
The Flaming Lips 2011 #2: The Flaming Lips with Neon Indian	March	Released: March 23, 2011; Labels: Warner Bros./Lovely Sorts of Death	EP	Collaborative mini-album with Neon Indian released at various records stores on special colored 12" vinyl.
The Flaming Lips 2011 #3: Gummy Song Skull	April	Released: April 20, 2011; Labels: Warner Bros./Lovely Sorts of Death	EP	Released at various record stores as a giant skull made of an edible gelatin substance. Inside the skull was a USB stick containing 4 new songs.
The Flaming Lips 2011 #4: The Flaming Lips with Prefuse 73	May	Released: May 23, 2011; Labels: Warner Bros./Lovely Sorts of Death	EP	Collaborative mini-album with Guillermo Scott Herren, released at various records stores on randomly colored 12" vinyls.
The Flaming Lips 2011 #5: The Soft Bulletin Live la Fantastique de Institution 2011	June	Released: June 14, 2011; Labels: Warner Bros./Lovely Sorts of Death	remix album	Rerecorded version of The Soft Bulletin live in-studio, released at two shows at the Hollywood Cemetery,
The Flaming Lips 2011 #6: Gummy Song Fetus	June	Released: June 25, 2011; Labels: Warner Bros./Lovely Sorts of Death	EP	Released at various record stores as a replica of an unborn fetus made of an edible gelatin substance. Inside the fetus was a USB stick containing 3 new songs.
The Flaming Lips 2011 #7: The Flaming Lips with Lightning Bolt	July	Released: July 26, 2011; Labels: Warner Bros./Lovely Sorts of Death	EP	Collaborative mini-album with Lightning Bolt, released at various records stores.
The Flaming Lips 2011 #8: Strobo Trip – Light & Audio Phase Illusions Toy	September	Released: September 20, 2011; Labels: Warner Bros./Lovely Sorts of Death	album	Box set released at various records stores containing a stroboscope light and a memory stick with three tracks of music, including one six-hour track.
The Flaming Lips 2011 #9: 7 Skies H3 – 24 Hour Skull	October	Released: October 31, 2011; Labels: Warner Bros./Lovely Sorts of Death	album	One 24-hour track released on limited edition flash drives encased in real human skulls, for Halloween. A website was also set up, streaming the song on an endless loop.
The Flaming Lips 2011 #10: Atlas Eets Christmas – Infinite Christmas Sounds	November	Released: November 27, 2011; Labels: Warner Bros./Lovely Sorts of Death	compilation album	Anthology of Flaming Lips Christmas songs, streamed on a loop at atlaseetschristmas.com.
The Flaming Lips 2011 #11: The Flaming Lips with Yoko Ono/Plastic Ono Band	December	Released: December 31, 2011; Labels: Warner Bros./Lovely Sorts of Death	EP	Collaborative EP with Yoko Ono and the Plastic Ono Band, released at a New Year's Eve concert, on 2000 multi-colored 12" vinyl, 600 of which glowed in the dark.

== Music videos ==
- Everyone Wants To Live Forever (1992)
- Frogs (1992)
- Turn It On (1993)
- She Don't Use Jelly (1993)
- Be My Head (1994)
- Bad Days (1995)
- Christmas At The Zoo (1995)
- When You Smile (1995)
- This Here Giraffe (1996)
- Race For The Prize (1999)
- Watin' For A Superman (1999)
- Do You Realize?? (2002)
- Are You A Hypnotist?? (2002)
- Yoshimi Battles the Pink Robots PT1 (2002)
- Phoebe Battles the Pink Robots (2002)
- Fight Test (2002)
- The Golden Path (2003)
- Spongebob & Patrick Confront the Psychic Wall of Energy (2004)
- Mr. Ambulance Driver (2005)
- The W.A.N.D. (2006)
- The Yeah Yeah Yeah Song (2006)
- I Can Be A Frog (2009)
- Watching The Planets (2009)
- Powerless (2010)
- The Sparrow Looks Up At The Machine (2010)
- See The Leaves (2010)
- I Wanna Get High But I Don't Want Brain Damage (2011)
- Girl, You're So Weird (2012)
- Supermoon Made Me Want To Pee (2012)
- The First Time I Ever Saw Your Face (2012)
- I'm Working At NASA On Acid (2012)
- The First Time I Ever Saw Your Face [Amanda Palmer cut] (2012)
- Ashes In The Air (2013)
- Bohemian Rhapsody (2013)
- Look... The Sun Is Rising (2013)
- You Lust (2013)
- Try To Explain (2013)
- Be Free... A Way (2013)
- Turning Violent (2013)
- How?? (2017)
- There Should Be Unicorns (2017)
- Sunrise (Eyes Of The Young) (2017)
- Nigdy Nie (Never No) (2017)
- The Castle (2017)
- Almost Home (Blisko Domu) (2017)
- We A Famly (2017)
- Giant Baby (2019)
- How Many Times (2019)
- Will You Return / When You Come Down (2020)
- Flowers of Neptune 6 (2020)
- Dinosaurs On The Mountain (2020)
- At The Movies On Quaaludes (2020)
- Brother Eye (2020)
- You N Me Sellin' Weed (2020)
- Mother Please Don't Be Sad (2020)
- Assassins Of Youth (2020)
- God And The Policeman (2020)
- My Religion Is You (2020)

== Other appearances ==
=== Studio ===
Year	Title	Release	Notes
1989	"After the Gold Rush"	The Bridge: A Tribute to Neil Young	Neil Young cover
1992	"Ballrooms of Mars"	split single with Mr. Bungle	T-Rex cover
1993	"Sun Arise"	Welcome to Our Nightmare: A Tribute to Alice Cooper	Rolf Harris cover
1993	"It Was a Very Good Year"	Chairman of the Board: Interpretations of Songs Made Famous by Frank Sinatra	Ervin Drake cover
1993	"Life on Mars?"	split single with the Lemonheads	David Bowie cover
1994	"Ice Drummer"	Your Invitation to Suicide: A Tribute to Songs of Martin Rev, Alan Vega	Suicide cover; some sources give release as 1993
1995	"Nobody Told Me"	Working Class Hero: A Tribute to John Lennon	John Lennon cover
1997	"Hot Day"	SubUrbia	original song
2000	"White Christmas"	It's a Cool Cool Christmas	Irving Berlin cover
2004	"Go"	The Late Great Daniel Johnston: Discovered Covered	Daniel Johnston cover with Sparklehorse
2004	"SpongeBob & Patrick Confront the Psychic Wall of Energy"	The SpongeBob SquarePants Movie: Music from the Movie and More...	original song
2005	"Seven Nation Army"	Late Night Tales: The Flaming Lips	The White Stripes cover
2005	"Bohemian Rhapsody"	Killer Queen: A Tribute to Queen	Queen cover
2005	"If I Only Had a Brain"	Stubbs the Zombie: The Soundtrack	Written by Yip Harburg and Harold Arlen
2007	"The Supreme Being Teaches Spider-Man How to Be in Love"	Spider-Man 3	original song
2007	"(Just Like) Starting Over"	Instant Karma: The Amnesty International Campaign to Save Darfur	John Lennon cover
2007	"I Was Zapped by the Lucky Super Rainbow"	Good Luck Chuck	original song
2007	"The Tale of the Horny Frog" and "Maybe I'm Not the One"	The Heartbreak Kid	original song
2007	"Love the World You Find"	Mr. Magorium's Wonder Emporium	original song
2009	"Borderline"	Covered, a Revolution in Sound	Madonna cover
2009	"Kundalini Express"	New Tales to Tell: A Tribute to Love and Rockets	Love and Rockets cover
2011	"Smothered in Hugs"	Sing for Your Meat: A Tribute to Guided by Voices	Guided by Voices cover
2012	"God Only Knows"	MOJO Presents Pet Sounds Revisited	The Beach Boys cover
2012	"Smoke on the Water"	Re-Machined: A Tribute to Deep Purple's Machine Head	Deep Purple cover
2015	"Atlantis"	Gazing with Tranquility: A Tribute to Donovan	Donovan cover
2016	"Dark Star"	Day of the Dead	Grateful Dead cover
2019	"Little Hands"	More Oar: A Tribute to the Skip Spence Album	Skip Spence cover
2019	"Sing It Now, Sing It Somehow"	Hanukkah+	original song
2021	"Snail: I'm Avail"	The SpongeBob Movie: Sponge on the Run	original song
2021	"Lay Lady Lay"	Dylan ...Revisited	Bob Dylan cover
2021	Where The Viaduct Looms	Nick Cave cover album	With Nell Smith
2022	"Mrs. Lennon"	Ocean Child: Songs of Yoko Ono	Yoko Ono cover
2022	"Lucifer Hummingbird"	For the Birds: Vol. II	original song

=== Radio ===
Year	Title	Original broadcast	Original artist	Release
1996	"Raindrops Keep Fallin' on My Head"	KCRW, May 1996	B. J. Thomas	"Brainville" B-side
2003	"Can't Get You Out of My Head"	KEXP, August 2002	Kylie Minogue	"Fight Test" B-side
2003	"The Golden Age"	CD101, August 2002	Beck	"Fight Test" B-side
2003	"Knives Out"	KCRW, August 2002	Radiohead	"Fight Test" B-side
2007	"War Pigs"	iTunes, 2007	Black Sabbath	iTunes Originals

=== Live ===
- "Thank You" and "Death Valley '69" – 1988 split single with the Fleshtones and Steve Kilbey
- "Whole Lotta Love" – 2005 soundtrack Fearless Freaks
- "Gates of Steel" – 2014 split single with Devo

== Video albums ==
Title	Album details
The Fearless Freaks	Released: May 17, 2005; Formats: DVD
VOID	Released: August 23, 2005; Formats: DVD
U.F.O.s at the Zoo	Released: August 7, 2007; Formats: DVD
Christmas on Mars	Released: November 11, 2008; Formats: DVD, Vinyl + DVD, DVD + CD

== Guest appearances ==
=== Albums ===
- Good News for People Who Love Bad News (2004) – Modest Mouse – additional instrumentation ("The Good Times Are Killing Me")
- "My Mechanical Friend" (2012) – Grace Potter – co-writing and instrumentation
- Warrior (2012) – Kesha – producer ("Past Lives")
- Miley Cyrus and Her Dead Petz (2015) – Miley Cyrus – producer ("Dooo It!", "Karen Don't Be Sad", "The Floyd Song (Sunrise)", "Something About Space Dude", "Fuckin Fucked Up", "BB Talk", "Milky Milky Milk", "Cyrus Skies", "I'm So Drunk", "Tangerine", "Tiger Dreams", "Evil Is But a Shadow" and "Miley Tibetan Bowlzzz")

=== Singles ===
- "The Golden Path" (2003) – The Chemical Brothers
