= Greatest Hits, Vol. 1 (Flaming Lips album) =

Greatest hits album by The Flaming Lips
- Released: April 2018
- Recorded: 1992–2017
- Genre: Alternative rock, experimental rock, psychedelic pop, dream pop
- Length: 223:47
- Label: Warner Bros. Records

The Flaming Lips chronology
Oczy Mlody (2017)	Greatest Hits, Vol. 1 (2018)	Death Trippin' at Sunrise: Rarities, B-Sides & Flexi Discs: 1986–1990 (2018)

Greatest Hits, Vol. 1 is a compilation album by the American experimental rock group The Flaming Lips. The first two discs are entirely made up of songs that span from 1992's Hit to Death in the Future Head to 2017's Oczy Mlody, with the third disc featuring demos, B-sides, rarities, and the band's contributions to movie soundtracks.

== Release ==
On April 27, 2018, it was announced that The Flaming Lips would release a new compilation album titled Greatest Hits, Vol. 1 on June 1 through Warner Bros. Records.

== Reception ==
Professional ratings
Review scores
Source	Rating
AllMusic	4/5 stars

AllMusic's Heather Phares noted that it "does an admirable job of boiling down their sprawling quarter-century stint on Warner Bros. into a slightly more manageable three-disc set", ultimately concluding that the album "caters to all levels of Flaming Lips fans and does it well".

== Track listing ==
All tracks written by Coyne/Drozd/Ivins, except when noted.

Disc 1
No.	Title	Writer(s)	Original album	Length
1.	"Talking 'Bout the Smiling Deathporn Immortality Blues (Everyone Wants to Live Forever)"		Hit to Death in the Future Head (1992)	3:50
2.	"Hit Me Like You Did the First Time"		Hit to Death in the Future Head	3:30
3.	"Frogs"		Hit to Death in the Future Head	4:26
4.	"Felt Good To Burn"		Hit to Death in the Future Head	3:21
5.	"Turn It On"	Coyne/Drozd/Ivins/Jones	Transmissions From the Satellite Heart (1993)	4:40
6.	"She Don't Use Jelly"	Coyne/Drozd/Ivins/Jones	Transmissions From the Satellite Heart	3:19
7.	"Chewin' the Apple of Your Eye"	Coyne/Drozd/Ivins/Jones	Transmissions From the Satellite Heart	3:48
8.	"Slow Nerve Action"	Coyne/Drozd/Ivins/Jones	Transmissions From the Satellite Heart	5:53
9.	"Psychiatric Explorations of the Fetus with Needles"	Coyne/Drozd/Ivins/Jones	Clouds Taste Metallic (1995)	3:28
10.	"Brainville"	Coyne/Drozd/Ivins/Jones	Clouds Taste Metallic	3:13
11.	"Lightning Strikes the Postman"	Coyne/Drozd/Ivins/Jones	Clouds Taste Metallic	2:50
12.	"When You Smile"	Coyne/Drozd/Ivins/Jones	Clouds Taste Metallic	3:03
13.	"Bad Days [Aurally Excited Version]"	Coyne/Drozd/Ivins/Jones	Clouds Taste Metallic	4:38
14.	"Riding to Work in the Year 2025"		Zaireeka (1997)	5:53
15.	"Race for the Prize (Sacrifice of the New Scientists)"		The Soft Bulletin (1999)	4:16
16.	"Waitin' for a Superman (Is It Gettin' Heavy?)"		The Soft Bulletin	4:18
17.	"The Spark That Bled"		The Soft Bulletin	5:55
18.	"What Is the Light?"		The Soft Bulletin	4:04

Disc 2
No.	Title	Writer(s)	Original album	Length
1.	"Yoshimi Battles the Pink Robots, Pt. 1"	Booker/Coyne/Drozd/Fridmann/Ivins	Yoshimi Battles The Pink Robots (2002)	4:42
2.	"In the Morning of the Magicians"	Booker/Coyne/Drozd/Fridmann/Ivins	Yoshimi Battles The Pink Robots	6:17
3.	"All We Have Is Now"	Booker/Coyne/Drozd/Fridmann/Ivins	Yoshimi Battles The Pink Robots	3:54
4.	"Do You Realize??"	Booker/Coyne/Drozd/Fridmann/Ivins	Yoshimi Battles The Pink Robots	3:32
5.	"The W.A.N.D."		At War With the Mystics (2006)	3:42
6.	"Pompeii am Gotterdammerung"		At War With the Mystics	4:21
7.	"Vein of Stars"		At War With the Mystics	4:10
8.	"The Yeah Yeah Yeah Song (With All Your Power)"		At War With The Mystics	4:54
9.	"Convinced of the Hex"		Embryonic (2009)	3:55
10.	"See the Leaves"		Embryonic	4:25
11.	"Silver Trembling Hands"		Embryonic	4:00
12.	"Is David Bowie Dying?"	Coyne/Drozd	The Flaming Lips and Heady Fwends (2012)	6:39
13.	"Try to Explain"	Coyne/Drozd	The Terror (2013)	4:44
14.	"Always There in Our Hearts"	Coyne/Drozd	The Terror	4:36
15.	"How??"	Coyne/Drozd	Oczy Mlody (2017)	4:24
16.	"There Should Be Unicorns"	Coyne/Drozd	Oczy Mlody	5:51
17.	"The Castle"	Coyne/Drozd	Oczy Mlody	4:50

Disc 3
No.	Title	Writer(s)	Original album	Length
1.	"Zero To a Million" (previously unreleased demo, recorded 1991)	Coyne/Donahue/Ivins		3:22
2.	"Jets (Cupid's Kiss Vs. the Psyche of Death) [2-Track Demo]"	Coyne/Donahue/Ivins	Yeah, I Know It's a Drag... But Wastin' Pigs Is Still Radical (1991)	4:21
3.	"Thirty-Five Thousand Feet of Despair"		Zaireeka (1997)	4:38
4.	"The Captain"		The Soft Bulletin 5.1 (2006)	5:09
5.	"1000 Ft Hands"		The Soft Bulletin 5.1	5:46
6.	"Noodling Theme [Epic Sunset Mix #5]"	Coyne/Drozd	The Southern Oklahoma Cosmic Trigger Contest (2001)	3:23
7.	"Up Above the Daily Hum"		Yoshimi Battles the Pink Robots 5.1 (2003)	3:49
8.	"The Yeah Yeah Yeah Song (In Anatropous Reflex)"	Coyne/Donahue/Ivins	At War with the Mystics 5.1 (2006)	4:17
9.	"We Can't Predict the Future"		The Soft Bulletin 5.1	3:03
10.	"Your Face Can Tell the Future"		At War with the Mystics 5.1	5:08
11.	"You Gotta Hold On"		At War with the Mystics 5.1	4:03
12.	"What Does It Mean?"	Coyne/Drozd/Ivins/Scurlock	Embryonic	5:09
13.	"Spider-Man Vs. Muhammad Ali" (edit of "The Supreme Being Teaches Spider-Man How To Be In Love" from Music from and Inspired by Spider-Man 3)	Coyne/Drozd		2:50
14.	"I Was Zapped By the Lucky Super Rainbow"		Good Luck Chuck Motion Picture Soundtrack (2007)	3:33
15.	"Enthusiasm for Life Defeats Existential Fear, Pt. 2"	Coyne/Drozd	Gummy Song Fetus (2011)	5:06
16.	"If Only I Had a Brain"	Arlen/Harburg	Stubbs the Zombie: The Soundtrack (2005)	2:16
17.	"Silent Night/Lord, Can You Hear Me" (from Silent Night Single)	Pierce		4:33
Total length:				3:43:47

== Charts ==
2023 chart performance for Greatest Hits, Vol. 1
Chart (2023)	Peak position
Hungarian Physical Albums (MAHASZ)	9
