= 20 Years of Weird: Flaming Lips 1986–2006 =

Compilation album by The Flaming Lips
- Released: March 27, 2006 (UK)
- Recorded: 1986–2006
- Genre: Indie rock
- Length: 67:24
- Label: Warner Bros.
- Producer: The Flaming Lips and various

The Flaming Lips compilation chronology
Yoshimi Battles the Pink Robots (2002)	20 Years of Weird: Flaming Lips 1986–2006 (2006)	iTunes Originals – The Flaming Lips (2007)

Professional ratings
Review scores
Source	Rating
Pitchfork Media	(6.0/10)

20 Years of Weird: Flaming Lips 1986–2006 is an updated version of the free compilation CD given away at the SXSW Film premier of The Flaming Lips documentary "The Fearless Freaks", a film by Bradley Beesley. It is a predominantly live compilation, recorded throughout the career of the Flaming Lips (between 1986 and 2003), though the first three tracks are recorded in the studio. These are: the introduction by Wayne Coyne, "Free Radicals" from the current album At War with the Mystics and "Enthusiasm for Life Defeats Existential Fear", a previously unavailable track.

Some notable tracks contained on this compilation are "Shine on Sweet Jesus", a track recorded live with a short lived line-up which included Jonathan Donahue (of Mercury Rev), and current Flaming Lips producer Dave Fridmann, also of Mercury Rev. There is also a cover of Led Zeppelin's "Whole Lotta Love" (sung with the lyrics "Whole Lotta Satan"), which is played before "Cant Stop the Spring". The track "Sleeping on the Roof" is a live recording from the Flaming Lips' "Parking Lot Experiments" in 1996, where the band got some of their fans to play pre-recorded tapes (of music by the band) in their car stereos simultaneously.

== Track listing ==
No.	Title	Length
1.	"Wayne's Intro"	2:13
2.	"Free Radicals" (from At War with the Mystics)	3:39
3.	"Enthusiasm for Life Defeats Existential Fear..."	5:04
4.	"With You" (from Hear It Is)	3:29
5.	"Whole Lotta Love/Can't Stop the Spring" (Led Zeppelin cover/from Oh My Gawd!!!)	5:50
6.	"Shine on Sweet Jesus – Jesus Song No. 5" (from In a Priest Driven Ambulance)	5:36
7.	"Space Age Love Song" (Flock of Seagulls cover)	3:59
8.	"Moth in the Incubator" (from "Transmissions from the Satellite Heart")	5:37
9.	"When You Smile/Psychiatric Explorations of the Fetus with Needles*" (from Clouds Taste Metallic)	12:05
10.	"Sleeping on the Roof"	14:31
11.	"The Observer" (from The Soft Bulletin)	5:15

* – Not mentioned on CD track list.
