= A Collection of Songs Representing an Enthusiasm for Recording...By Amateurs =

Compilation album by The Flaming Lips
- Released: September 29, 1998
- Recorded: 1984–1991
- Genre: Indie rock
- Length: 64:51
- Label: Restless

The Flaming Lips compilation chronology
| A Collection of Songs Representing an Enthusiasm for Recording...By Amateurs (1998) | Finally the Punk Rockers Are Taking Acid (2002) |

Professional ratings
Review scores
| Source | Rating |
|---|---|
| Allmusic | 4.5/5 stars |
| Christgau's Consumer Guide | (dud) |
| The Encyclopedia of Popular Music | 3/5 stars |
| The Rolling Stone Album Guide | 3/5 stars |
| Pitchfork | 7.0/10 |

A Collection of Songs Representing an Enthusiasm for Recording...By Amateurs is a compilation album by The Flaming Lips, released on September 29, 1998 on Restless Records.

== Track listing ==
All tracks are written by The Flaming Lips, unless otherwise noted.

| No. | Title | Original appearance | Length |
|---|---|---|---|
| 1. | "Bag Full of Thoughts" | The Flaming Lips (1984) | 5:38 |
| 2. | "Jesus Shootin' Heroin" | Hear It Is (1986) | 7:21 |
| 3. | "One Million Billionth of a Millisecond on a Sunday Morning" | Oh My Gawd!!! (1987) | 9:23 |
| 4. | "Chrome Plated Suicide" | Telepathic Surgery (1989) | 5:45 |
| 5. | "Michael Time to Wake Up" | Telepathic Surgery (1989) | 0:31 |
| 6. | "Hell's Angels Cracker Factory" | Telepathic Surgery (1989) | 3:02 |
| 7. | "Unconsciously Screamin'" | In a Priest Driven Ambulance (1990) | 3:54 |
| 8. | "God Walks Among Us Now" | In a Priest Driven Ambulance (1990) | 4:45 |
| 9. | "Strychnine/Peace, Love, and Understanding" (Gerald Rosie/Nick Lowe) | Double-A-Side with "Drug Machine" (1989) | 3:23 |
| 10. | "Death Valley '69" (Robert Bertelli, Kim Gordon, Thurston Moore, Lee Ranaldo) | The Bob Flexi #32 | 3:04 |
| 11. | "Thank You" (Jimmy Page, Robert Plant) | The Bob Flexi #32 | 2:30 |
| 12. | "Ma, I Didn't Notice" | Unconsciously Screamin' single (1990) | 7:41 |
| 13. | "After the Gold Rush" (Neil Young) | The Bridge: A Tribute to Neil Young (1989) | 4:14 |
| 14. | "I Want to Kill My Brother; The Cymbal Head" | Guitarrorists various artists compilation (1991) | 3:40 |

Tracks 10. & 11. Live from the Milestone Club, Charlotte, NC, 9-11-87
