= Scratching the Door: The First Recordings of the Flaming Lips =

Compilation album by The Flaming Lips
- Released: April 20, 2018
- Recorded: 1983–1984
- Genres: Alternative rock; experimental rock; noise rock
- Length: 73:46
- Label: Warner Bros.

The Flaming Lips chronology
Onboard the International Space Station: Concert for Peace (2017)	Scratching the Door: The First Recordings of the Flaming Lips (2018)	Seeing the Unseeable: The Complete Studio Recordings of the Flaming Lips 1986-1990 (2018)

Scratching the Door: The First Recordings of the Flaming Lips is a rarities album of the very first recordings made by the American experimental rock group The Flaming Lips, including their self-titled EP and the demos for the band's first album, Hear It Is.

== Release ==
On February 28, 2018, the release of this album and another compilation, Seeing the Unseeable: The Complete Studio Recordings of the Flaming Lips 1986-1990 was announced.

== Critical reception ==
Professional ratings
Review scores
Source	Rating
AllMusic	3.5/5 stars
Under the Radar	6.5/10 stars

AllMusic's Heather Phares stated that it "is an entertaining reminder of just how much the band changed over the years", concluding that it's "a suitably gonzo document of the early days of one of indie's most idiosyncratic yet definitive acts". Under the Radar's Frank Valish proclaimed "What is surprising, listening to these recordings 30-some years later, is how well they stand up in light of the band's more lauded work", concluding "But ultimately, Scratching the Door is more than mere historical document. It's a still vital collection and reminder that The Flaming Lips didn't begin with The Soft Bulletin or even "She Don't Use Jelly". They were exciting from the start".

== Track listing ==
All tracks written by The Flaming Lips unless otherwise noted. Track listing and credits partially adapted from liner notes.

Self-titled EP
No.	Title	Length
1.	"Bag Full of Thoughts"	5:40
2.	"Out for a Walk"	3:14
3.	"Garden of Eyes"	1:56
4.	"Forever Is a Long Time"	3:19
5.	"Scratching the Door"	7:09
6.	"My Own Planet"	4:11

1st Cassette Demo
No.	Title	Writer(s)	Length
7.	"Killer on the Radio"		2:58
8.	"Batman Theme"	Hefti	1:47
9.	"Anyway, Anyhow, Anywhere"	Daltrey/Townshend	2:32
10.	"Handsome Johnny"	Havens/Gossett, Jr.	2:56

2nd Cassette Demo
No.	Title	Length
11.	"Flaming Lips Theme Song"	3:53
12.	"The Future Is Gone"	3:22
13.	"Underground Pharmacist"	4:48
14.	"Real Fast Words"	3:15

Hear It Is Demos
No.	Title	Writer(s)	Length
15.	"Groove Room"		6:07
16.	"Jesus Shooting Heroin"		7:05
17.	"Trains, Brains & Rain"		4:18
18.	"Communication Breakdown"	Page/Jones/Bonham	3:44

Hear It Is Session Outtake
No.	Title	Length
19.	"Summertime Blues"	2:29
Total length:		73:46
