= Waiting for Superman =

Waiting For Superman may refer to:

- Waiting for "Superman", a 2010 documentary
- Waiting for Superman (song), a 2013 song by the American rock band Daughtry
- "Waiting for Superman" (Superman & Lois), an episode of Superman & Lois

== See also ==
- Waitin' for a Superman, a 1999 song by The Flaming Lips
