= The Mushroom Tapes =

The Mushroom Tapes may refer to:

- The Mushroom Tapes (book), a 2025 non-fiction work by Helen Garner, Chloe Hooper, and Sarah Krasnostein
- The Mushroom Tapes, title of the second disc in the 2002 album The Day They Shot a Hole in the Jesus Egg, by the Flaming Lips
- The Mushroom Tapes, a "greatest hits" album of tracks by Australian band The Badloves, released under this title in 2000
