= Taylor Johnson =

Taylor Johnson may refer to:

- Taylor Johnson (rugby league)
- Taylor Johnson (tennis)
- Taylor Johnson, musician in the David Crowder Band

== See also ==
- Taylor-Johnson, a surname
