= The Flaming Lips (EP) =

EP by The Flaming Lips
- Released: 1984
- Recorded: 1984
- Genres: Post-punk; experimental rock; noise rock
- Length: 25:46
- Label: Restless
- Producer: The Flaming Lips

The Flaming Lips chronology
The Flaming Lips (1984)	Hear It Is (1986)

Professional ratings
Review scores
Source	Rating
AllMusic	2/5 stars
The Rolling Stone Album Guide	2/5 stars

The Flaming Lips is the debut release by American rock band the Flaming Lips, released in 1984.

== Re-releases ==
The EP was remastered and re-released as part of the compilation Finally the Punk Rockers Are Taking Acid. "Bag Full of Thoughts" was lifted for the retrospective compilation A Collection of Songs Representing an Enthusiasm for Recording...By Amateurs. In 2014, it was re-released on vinyl, with the cover art altered to an abstract illustration of the original photograph used on the original release. The EP in its entirety was included on the rarities album Scratching the Door: The First Recordings of the Flaming Lips, with "Garden of Eyes" and "Forever Is A Long Time" being split into two separate tracks.

== Track listing ==
All tracks are written by The Flaming Lips.

No.	Title	Length
1.	"Bag Full of Thoughts"	5:34
2.	"Out for a Walk"	3:20
3.	"Garden of Eyes/Forever is a Long Time"	5:29
4.	"Scratching the Door"	7:12
5.	"My Own Planet"	4:11
Total length:		25:46

== Personnel ==
- Wayne Coyne – guitars
- Mark Coyne – vocals
- Michael Ivins – bass guitar
- Richard English – drums
