= Gummy Song Skull =

2011 EP by the Flaming Lips

EP by The Flaming Lips
- Released: April 2011
- Recorded: April 2011
- Genre: Experimental rock, psychedelic rock
- Length: 24:42
- Label: Warner Bros. Lovely Sorts of Death
- Producer: The Flaming Lips, Dave Fridmann

Flaming Lips EP chronology
The Flaming Lips with Neon Indian (2011)	Gummy Song Skull (2011)	The Flaming Lips with Prefuse 73 (2011)

Gummy Song Skull is an EP released by The Flaming Lips as part of the Flaming Lips 2011 series of monthly music releases. This was a limited release contained on a USB keydrive and placed inside a brain-shaped gummy which was further encased in a gummy skull. The EP was only sold in a few record stores in the US, at a price of $150. It has yet to be officially released on any other format.

== Track listing ==
No.	Title	Length
1.	"Drug Chart"	5:16
2.	"In Our Bodies, Out of Our Heads"	4:43
3.	"Walk with Me"	5:39
4.	"Hillary's Time Machine Machine"	9:03

== Personnel ==
- Wayne Coyne
- Steven Drozd
- Michael Ivins
- Kliph Scurlock
- Derek Brown
