= Finally the Punk Rockers Are Taking Acid =

Compilation album by The Flaming Lips
- Released: October 1, 2002
- Recorded: 1984–1989
- Genre: Alternative rock, punk rock
- Label: Restless
- Producer: The Flaming Lips, Paul Avery

The Flaming Lips compilation chronology
A Collection of Songs Representing an Enthusiasm for Recording...By Amateurs (1998)	Finally the Punk Rockers Are Taking Acid (2002)	The Day They Shot a Hole in the Jesus Egg (2002)

Professional ratings
Review scores
Source	Rating
Allmusic	2.5/5 stars
Rolling Stone	4/5 stars
The Rolling Stone Album Guide	3/5 stars

Finally the Punk Rockers Are Taking Acid is a compilation album by The Flaming Lips, collecting their first three studio albums (Hear It Is, Oh My Gawd!!! and Telepathic Surgery) alongside their self-titled debut EP The Flaming Lips, and previously unreleased material and demo recordings.

It is the first of two releases archiving the band's Restless Records releases, and is followed by The Day They Shot a Hole in the Jesus Egg.

== Track listing ==
=== Disc one ===
This disc contains all of the tracks from The Flaming Lips and Hear It Is (omitting the bonus track, "Summertime Blues," found on some releases of Hear It Is), plus four bonus tracks. The track list for this disc is misprinted, switching "Garden of Eyes/Forever is a Long Time" and "Scratchin' the Door."

No.	Title	Length
1.	"Bag Full of Thoughts"	5:39
2.	"Out for a Walk"	3:20
3.	"Garden of Eyes/Forever Is a Long Time"	5:29
4.	"Scratchin' the Door"	7:12
5.	"My Own Planet"	4:11
6.	"With You"	3:39
7.	"Unplugged"	2:14
8.	"Trains, Brains & Rain"	3:39
9.	"Jesus Shootin' Heroin"	7:19
10.	"Just Like Before"	3:22
11.	"She Is Death"	4:05
12.	"Charlie Manson Blues"	4:22
13.	"Man From Pakistan"	3:59
14.	"Godzilla Flick"	4:06
15.	"Staring at Sound/With You"	5:06

Bonus tracks
No.	Title	Length
16.	"Killer on the Radio"	2:57
17.	"Batman Theme"	1:46
18.	"Anyway, Anyhow, Anywhere"	2:30
19.	"Handsome Johnny"	2:57

=== Disc two ===
This disc contains all of the tracks from Oh My Gawd!!! as well as five bonus tracks.

No.	Title	Length
1.	"Everything's Explodin'"	4:44
2.	"One Million Billionth of a Millisecond on a Sunday Morning"	9:21
3.	"Maximum Dream for Evil Knievel"	2:51
4.	"Can't Exist"	2:48
5.	"Ode to C.C. (Part 1)"	0:44
6.	"The Ceiling Is Bendin'"	3:45
7.	"Prescription: Love"	6:10
8.	"Thanks to You"	3:56
9.	"Can't Stop the Spring"	4:11
10.	"Ode to C.C. (Part 2)"	1:50
11.	"Love Yer Brain"	7:43

Bonus tracks
No.	Title	Length
12.	"Groove Room"	6:09
13.	"Jesus Shootin' Heroin"	7:05
14.	"Trains, Brains & Rain"	3:19
15.	"Communication Breakdown/Dazed & Confused"	3:50
16.	"One Million Billionth of a Millisecond on a Sunday Morning" (Live)	9:12

=== Disc three ===
This disc contains all of the tracks from Telepathic Surgery as well as seven bonus tracks.

No.	Title	Length
1.	"Drug Machine in Heaven"	2:11
2.	"Right Now"	3:57
3.	"Michael, Time to Wake Up"	0:29
4.	"Chrome Plated Suicide"	5:43
5.	"Hari-Krishna Stomp Wagon"	3:47
6.	"Miracle on 42nd St."	2:52
7.	"Fryin' Up"	2:44
8.	"Hell's Angel's Cracker Factory" (Edit)	3:02
9.	"U.F.O. Story"	6:39
10.	"Redneck School of Technology"	2:57
11.	"Shaved Gorilla"	2:56
12.	"The Spontaneous Combustion of John"	0:53
13.	"Last Drop of Morning Dew"	1:58
14.	"Begs and Achin'"	4:14

Bonus tracks
No.	Title	Length
15.	"Death Valley '69" (Live)	3:04
16.	"Thank You"	2:27
17.	"Can't Stop the Spring"	4:27
18.	"Jesus Shooting Heroin" (Live)	8:14
19.	"My Own Planet" (Live)	7:37
20.	"After the Gold Rush"	4:11
21.	"Death Tripping at Sunrise"	4:32
