= Oczy Mlody =

Studio album by the Flaming Lips
- Released: January 13, 2017
- Recorded: June 2012 – June 2016
- Studio: Pink Floor Studios in Oklahoma City, Oklahoma, Tarbox Road Studios in Cassadaga, New York
- Genre: Neo-psychedelia; electronic; experimental rock; dream pop
- Length: 57:44
- Label: Warner Bros. (US), Bella Union (UK)
- Producer: The Flaming Lips, Dave Fridmann, Scott Booker

The Flaming Lips chronology
With a Little Help from My Fwends (2014)	Oczy Mlody (2017)	King's Mouth (2019)

Singles from Oczy Mlody
- 1. "The Castle" Released: October 21, 2016; 2. "How??" Released: November 11, 2016; 3. "Sunrise (Eyes of the Young)" Released: December 16, 2016; 4. "We a Famly" Released: January 6, 2017; 5. "Nigdy Nie (Never No)" Released: January 13, 2017

Oczy Mlody [ˈɔt͡ʂɨ ˈmwɔdɨ] (an erroneous Polish phrase, which could mean "the young eyes") is the fourteenth studio album by American rock band The Flaming Lips, released on January 13, 2017, on Warner Bros in the US and Bella Union in the UK. It is the first album to feature band members Jake Ingalls, Nicholas Ley and Matt Duckworth.

== Background and recording process ==
Studio work on the band's album The Terror wrapped up in April 2012, the year before Ingalls joined. Recordings for Oczy Mlody began only two months later and continued intermittently for four years in parallel with much other activity. In 2013 the band released a Stone Roses cover album. After touring for The Terror wrapped up in 2014, longtime member Kliph Scurlock was fired from the band. About the same time, the band teamed up with Miley Cyrus, who appeared on their covers version of the 1967 album Sgt. Pepper's Lonely Hearts Club Band by the Beatles titled With a Little Help from My Fwends. The following year, they assisted her with recording Miley Cyrus & Her Dead Petz, and went on tour as her backing band in support of the album. Recordings for Oczy Mlody eventually finished in June 2016, and the album was released on 13 January 2017.

== Title ==
In two videos released in late 2016, frontman Wayne Coyne describes how he found the album title and some of the song titles and lyrics in a second-hand book, a Polish translation of Erskine Caldwell's Close to Home, titled Blisko domu. He and the band liked the words primarily due to their sound, rather than their meaning, "which he interpreted as 'Oxy Melody,' a futuristic drug."

In any event, the grammatical cases, genders and word order in the Polish phrase are erroneous: oczy (eyes) is plural, and młody (young) is masculine singular. The correct translation of "The Young Eyes" would be: Młode oczy. Unless, the author's intention was to say: Oczy młodych, which translates to "The Eyes of the Young [People]".

== Reception ==
Professional ratings
Aggregate scores
Source	Rating
AnyDecentMusic?	6.7/10
Metacritic	69/100
Review scores
Source	Rating
AllMusic	3.5/5 stars
Clash	8/10
The Guardian	4/5 stars
The Independent	4/5 stars
Mojo	3/5 stars
NME	3/5 stars
Pitchfork	6.2/10
Rolling Stone	3/5 stars
The Skinny	4/5 stars
Slant Magazine	4.5/5 stars

Oczy Mlody was released to positive to mixed reviews from critics. AllMusic's Heather Phares gave the album 3.5/5 stars and noted that "Though its title is Polish for 'the eyes of the young', the Flaming Lips' state of mind on their Oczy Mlody album isn't exactly naive [sic]", ultimately concluding that "Though ['We a Famly''s] happy ending feels a bit tacked-on compared to the rest of Oczy Mlody's trippy melancholy, its meaning is clear: finding hope isn't easy, but seen the right way, it can be an adventure." Clash Magazine gave the album a positive 8/10 score and noted that "Lyrically, Oczy Mlody falls into quixotic non-sequiturs that will either have you nodding sagely or rolling your eyes, depending on your disposition ('Legalise it, every drug right now', anyone?), but that's par for the course. They've managed to meld together the grand themes of The Soft Bulletin and Yoshimi... with some of the experimentation of Embryonic and The Terror, and it makes for a fascinating return." In a highly positive review, Slant Magazine's Jonathan Wroble awarded the album 4.5/5 stars and praised it for being a "masterstroke of rhythm and tone that neither trips head-on into bliss nor spins into dismay". A more mixed review came from Rolling Stone, who gave the album 3/5 stars and noted that it's "decidedly more stripped back and puts a fresh gleam on the Lips' usual pucker", but that "Aside from a lousy plot, Oczy Mlody's only other failing is it's a slow build" and concluded that "The album is a bitter pill at first [sic] but it pays off to tune in and turn on".

On Metacritic, the album has a 69/100 score based on 31 critics, indicating "generally favorable reviews".

== Track listing ==
All tracks are written by Derek Brown, Wayne Coyne, Steven Drozd, Matt Duckworth, Jake Ingalls, Michael Ivins, and Nicholas Ley; except "How??", "There Should Be Unicorns", and "The Castle", written by Wayne Coyne and Steven Drozd.

Oczy Mlody track listing
No.	Title	Length
1.	"Oczy Mlody"	2:53
2.	"How??"	4:24
3.	"There Should Be Unicorns"	5:49
4.	"Sunrise (Eyes of the Young)"	4:04
5.	"Nigdy Nie (Never No)"	4:10
6.	"Galaxy I Sink"	3:57
7.	"One Night While Hunting for Faeries and Witches and Wizards to Kill"	6:07
8.	"Do Glowy"	4:18
9.	"Listening to the Frogs with Demon Eyes"	7:35
10.	"The Castle"	4:50
11.	"Almost Home (Blisko Domu)"	4:53
12.	"We a Famly" (featuring Miley Cyrus)	4:44
Total length:		57:44

Japanese bonus track
No.	Title	Length
13.	"Jest (There Is...)"	3:58
Total length:		61:50

== Personnel ==
The Flaming Lips

- Wayne Coyne – vocals, guitar, keyboards, mixing, engineering, artwork, design, graphics
- Michael Ivins – bass guitar
- Steven Drozd – vocals, guitar, keyboards, mixing, engineering
- Derek Brown – backing vocals, guitar, keyboards, mixing, engineering
- Matt Duckworth – backing vocals, drums, keyboards, mixing, engineering
- Jake Ingalls – guitar, keyboards, mixing, engineering
- Nicholas Ley – drums, mixing, engineering

Additional contributors

- Dave Fridmann – production, mastering, mixing, engineering
- Mike Ivins – mixing, engineering, backing vocals, bass guitar, keyboards
- Dennis Coyne – additional production, engineering
- Michael Fridmann – additional production
- George Salisbury – artwork, design, graphics, layout
- Robert Beatty – artwork, cover art, design, graphics
- Reggie Watts – additional vocals on "There Should Be Unicorns"

== Charts ==
Chart (2017)	Peak position
Belgian Albums (Ultratop Flanders)	43
Belgian Albums (Ultratop Wallonia)	138
German Albums (Offizielle Top 100)	88
Japanese Albums (Oricon)	147
New Zealand Heatseeker Albums (RMNZ)	1
Scottish Albums (OCC)	34
Swiss Albums (Schweizer Hitparade)	52
UK Albums (OCC)	38
US Billboard 200	62
