= Shambolic Birth and Early Life Of =

The Shambolic Birth and Early Life Of

Compilation album by The Flaming Lips
- Released: 17 September 2002
- Recorded: Goodnight Audio in Dallas, Texas, Hollywood, California, and Bensen Sound in Oklahoma City, Oklahoma
- Genre: Psychedelic rock
- Length: 49:58
- Label: Restless Records
- Producer: The Flaming Lips, Ruben Ayala, Randy Burns, and Scott Booker

The Flaming Lips compilation chronology
The Day They Shot a Hole in the Jesus Egg (2002)	The Shambolic Birth and Early Life Of (2002)	Late Night Tales: The Flaming Lips (2005)

The Shambolic Birth and Early Life Of is a promo compilation album by The Flaming Lips, released in 2002. It summarizes the first six years of The Flaming Lips. Released with limited distribution in music shops to promote Finally the Punk Rockers Are Taking Acid and The Day They Shot a Hole in the Jesus Egg, it is similar in many respects to the 1998 compilation 1984-1990.

== Track listing ==
No.	Title	Length
1.	"Killer on the Radio"	2:58
2.	"My Own Planet"	4:11
3.	"She Is Death"	4:05
4.	"One Million Billionth of a Millisecond on a Sunday Morning"	9:21
5.	"Unconsciously Screamin'"	3:52
6.	"Strychnine/ (What's So Funny 'Bout) Peace, Love, and Understanding"	3:59
7.	"Lucifer Rising"	3:35
8.	"Take Me Ta Mars"	3:13
9.	"Chrome Plated Suicide"	5:43
10.	"Agonizing"	3:26
11.	"Shine on Sweet Jesus"	4:27
12.	"Golden Hearse"	1:08
