= Anxious (album) =

Studio album by Nell Smith
- Released: April 11, 2025
- Recorded: 2023
- Studio: Brighton, United Kingdom
- Genre: Psychedelic pop; indie pop
- Length: 40:08
- Label: Bella Union
- Producer: Jack Wolter; Lily Wolter

Nell Smith chronology
Where the Viaduct Looms (2021)	Anxious (2025)

Singles from Anxious
- 1. "Anxious" Released: 6 February 2025; 2. "Billions of People" Released: 20 March 2025; 3. "Daisy Fields" Released: 11 April 2025

Anxious is the only studio album by English-Canadian singer Nell Smith. It was posthumously released on 11 April 2025, by UK-based label Bella Union.

Nell Smith (born 17 July 2007; Leeds, England) died at the age of 17 after being involved in a car crash in Alberta on 6 October 2024. She was contributing to the filming of a music video for her single "Split in the Sky" at the time.

== Background ==
Announced on 6 February 2025, by Bella Union, the album precedes Smith's collaborative project with the Flaming Lips, Where the Viaduct Looms. It was recorded in the label's studio in Brighton, and produced by sibling duo, Jack and Lily Wolter. Consisting of ten songs, the album incorporates elements of indie pop.

The title track was released as the lead single on the same date as the album's announcement, alongside a music video. It was described by American Songwriter as "a bright, psych-pop track that explores moments of anxiety and self-consciousness." The second single of the album, "Billions of People", was released on 20 March 2025. It was written in 2022 after Smith toured with the Flaming Lips in England. The third single, "Daisy Fields", was released on 11 April 2025, together with the album.

== Reception ==
Professional ratings
Review scores
Source	Rating
AllMusic	4/5 stars

AllMusic's Heather Phares noted that "Smith was only getting started on Anxious, and its poignant, eloquent peek into teenage girlhood is something to be cherished." Consequence described the album as "an upbeat slice of psych-pop in which Smith expresses her love of music as a way to cope with anxiety." Montreal Rocks commented "So many debut albums try to sound older, wiser, more polished than they need to be. Anxious doesn't do that. It leans into its youth. There's joy in the way it experiments, in the way it invites odd sounds into the mix just to see what happens." Spin referred to the album as a "collection of teenage hopes, fears, and emotions, but always expressed with a bright, 'Why not?' energy of experimentation. Think Regina Spektor fronting The Flaming Lips and you'll be close—but still not quite at Smith's indie pop sound."

== Track listing ==
Anxious track listing
No.	Title	Length
1.	"Anxious"	4:11
2.	"Daisy Fields"	3:30
3.	"Bubba"	3:18
4.	"The Worst Best Drug"	4:13
5.	"Service Song"	3:41
6.	"Boy in a Bubble"	6:47
7.	"Splash"	2:53
8.	"I Know Nothing"	3:48
9.	"Billions of People"	3:58
10.	"Split in the Sky"	3:49
Total length:		40:08

== Personnel ==
Credits for Anxious adapted from AllMusic.

- Alex Hanson – executive producer
- Erik Hanson – executive producer
- Jack Wolter – engineer, producer, vocals
- Lily Wolter – engineer, producer, vocals
- Nell Smith – primary artist, vocals
- Phill Williams – executive producer
- Stephen Kerrison – mastering
- Tim Sensabaugh – executive producer
