= Late Night Tales: The Flaming Lips =

Compilation album by various artists
- Released: March 7, 2005
- Genre: Alternative rock
- Label: Azuli
- Producer: Nigel Godrich, The Chemical Brothers, Brian Eno, Radiohead, Ken Nelson, Björk, et al.

The Flaming Lips compilation chronology
Shambolic Birth and Early Life Of (2002)	Late Night Tales: The Flaming Lips (2005)	20 Years of Weird: Flaming Lips 1986-2006 (2006)

Late Night Tales chronology
Four Tet (2004)	The Flaming Lips (2005)	Belle & Sebastian (2006)

Professional ratings
Review scores
Source	Rating
Allmusic	3.5/5 stars
Pitchfork Media	(7.6/10)

Late Night Tales: The Flaming Lips is a compilation album compiled by the members of The Flaming Lips, featuring songs by various artists. The album was released on March 7, 2005, and it features one new Flaming Lips recording, a cover of the White Stripes' "Seven Nation Army".

Late Night Tales: The Flaming Lips is the 13th in the Late Night Tales series. Each installment in the series is a compilation of songs that were influential on or favourites of the featured artist. Previous Late Night Tales compilations have been put together by Four Tet, Nightmares on Wax, Jamiroquai, and Turin Brakes, among others.

== Track listing ==
No.	Title	Performing Artist	Length
1.	"Unravel"	Björk	3:14
2.	"My Ship"	Miles Davis	4:24
3.	"Speed of Sound"	Chris Bell	5:09
4.	"It's a Bit of a Pain"	Faust	3:08
5.	"2HB"	Roxy Music	4:09
6.	"People"	Alfie	4:10
7.	"Flim"	Aphex Twin	2:53
8.	"Galileo" (Edit)	Mice Parade	1:57
9.	"Up the Down Escalator"	The Chameleons UK	3:57
10.	"Seven Nation Army" (Harry Potter's and George W. Bush's Severed Head Army Mix)	The Flaming Lips	2:49
11.	"Playground for a Wedgeless Firm"	The Chemical Brothers	2:21
12.	"Saudade"	Love & Rockets	4:57
13.	"Monochrome"	Lush	4:57
14.	"Sleep Comes Down"	The Psychedelic Furs	3:41
15.	"River Man"	Nick Drake	4:15
16.	"On Fire"	Sebadoh	3:34
17.	"Pyramid Song"	Radiohead	4:45
18.	"I'm Not in Love"	10cc	5:57
19.	"Another Green World"	Brian Eno	2:18
20.	"The Jist"	David Shrigley	3:08
