= This Here Giraffe =

Single by The Flaming Lips

from the album Clouds Taste Metallic
- Released: February 1996
- Recorded: 1995
- Genre: Neo-psychedelia, alternative rock, noise pop
- Length: 3:49
- Label: Warner Bros.
- Songwriters: Ronald Jones, Wayne Coyne, Michael Ivins, Steven Drozd
- Producer: The Flaming Lips

The Flaming Lips singles chronology
"Bad Days" (1995)	"This Here Giraffe" (1996)	"Brainville" (1996)

"This Here Giraffe" is a song by American psychedelic rock group The Flaming Lips. The song was released as a single from their 1995 album Clouds Taste Metallic.

The single was released exclusively in the UK on two CDs through Warner Bros. Records. It was accompanied by a music video directed by Sofia Coppola. The CD is notable because it was produced in the shape of a star.

In February 2015, it was played live alongside all the songs from the album at First Avenue for the first and only time ever.

== Track listings ==
CD 1

1. "This Here Giraffe"
2. "Jets Part 2" (live Peel Session version - recorded 1992)
3. "Life on Mars" (Written by David Bowie) (live Peel Session version - recorded 1992)

CD 2 (star-shaped)

1. "This Here Giraffe"
2. "The Sun" (live Peel Session version - recorded 1992)
3. "Hit Me Like You Did the First Time" (live Peel Session version - recorded 1992)

== Chart positions ==
Chart (1996)	Peak position
UK Singles (Official Charts)	72
