= Where the Viaduct Looms =

Studio album by Nell Smith and The Flaming Lips
- Released: 26 November 2021
- Genre: Alternative rock
- Length: 37:18
- Label: Bella Union
- Producer: The Flaming Lips

Nell Smith chronology
| Where the Viaduct Looms (2021) | Anxious (2025) |

The Flaming Lips chronology
| American Head (2020) | Where the Viaduct Looms (2021) | The Teardrop Throbs (2027) |

Where the Viaduct Looms is a collaboration album by the Flaming Lips and Nell Smith, released on November 26, 2021, by Bella Union. The album consists of Nick Cave covers, and is the only album Smith released in her lifetime before her 2024 death.

== Track listing ==
All tracks are written by Nick Cave.

| No. | Title | Length |
|---|---|---|
| 1. | "Girl In Amber" | 3:49 |
| 2. | "Weeping Song" | 4:27 |
| 3. | "Into My Arms" | 4:25 |
| 4. | "O Children" | 5:27 |
| 5. | "The Kindness Of Strangers" | 3:17 |
| 6. | "No More Shall We Part" | 4:02 |
| 7. | "Red Right Hand" | 4:35 |
| 8. | "The Ship Song" | 3:27 |
| 9. | "We Know Who You Are" | 3:49 |
| Total length: | | 37:18 |

== Personnel ==
- Nell Smith - vocals
- Wayne Coyne - guitars, backing vocals
- Derek Brown - keyboards, guitars
- Matt Kirksey - drums, percussion
- Steven Drozd - guitar, keyboards
- Michael Ivins - bass guitar, keyboards
- Jake Ingalls - keyboards, guitar
- Nicholas Ley - percussion, drums, sampler

Addsonal musicians

- Rachel Behan - backing vocals (tracks 3-5)
- Nev Cottee - guitar (track 2), bass guitar (track 9)
