= The Teardrop Throbs =

Studio album by The Flaming Lips
- Released: January 22, 2027
- Label: Third Man Records
- Producers: The Flaming Lips; Taylor Johnson; Dave Fridmann; Scott Booker

The Flaming Lips chronology
Where the Viaduct Looms (2021)	The Teardrop Throbs (2027)

Singles from The Teardrop Throbs
- 1. "God Will Control the Werewolves" Released: October 26, 2026

The Teardrop Throbs is the upcoming seventeenth studio album by American alternative rock band The Flaming Lips. It is set to be released January 22, 2027. It is the band's first studio album release in 7 years (the longest gap in the band's career) and the first after signing to Third Man Records.

== Background ==
On October 26, 2026, the album was announced and the first single, "God Will Control the Werewolves" was released.

The Teardrop Throbs notably marks the band's first studio album to not feature founding member and bass player Michael Ivins, who left the band in 2021. It is also their first album since 1992's Hit to Death in the Future Head to not feature long-time keyboardist, guitarist and drummer Steven Drozd, who was fired from the band in 2025. As such, it marks the recording debut for Tommy McKenzie and AJ Slaughter, the respective replacements for both members.

The band announced a tour throughout the United States and United Kingdom in promotion of the album, with each stop having two shows each focusing on the album and the band's early career and the other having "reimaginings" of songs from the album and songs they released from the 2000s onwards.

== Release ==
The album is set to release on Third Man Records on January 22, 2027. It is the first album of the band's to not be released on Warner Records in 37 years.

== Track listing ==
The Teardrop Throbs track listing
No.	Title	Length
1.	"Throb"	1:29
2.	"God Will Control the Werewolves"	4:21
3.	"Titan"	2:33
4.	"Every Teardrop Cried"	3:53
5.	"Hooray"	3:42
6.	"Instructions On How to Draw an Eyeball or How to Deal with a Loved One Who Is Addicted to Drugs"	4:53
7.	"You See You in Me"	3:50
8.	"You've Got Brain Damage"	3:40
9.	"At the End of the Day"	2:05
10.	"The Trees Are Getting Their Leaves / Ceasefire in the City of Singing Flame"	3:42
11.	"Ego Tripping at the Gates of Hell Part 2"	6:35
12.	"A Sunset Far Away"	3:57
13.	"Now I Understand"	1:46
