= Gummy Song Fetus =

EP by The Flaming Lips
- Released: June 2011
- Recorded: Earlier 2011
- Genre: Experimental rock, psychedelic rock
- Length: 12:30
- Label: Warner Bros. Lovely Sorts of Death
- Producer: The Flaming Lips, Dave Fridmann

Flaming Lips EP chronology
The Flaming Lips with Prefuse 73 (2011)	Gummy Song Fetus (2011)	The Flaming Lips with Lightning Bolt (2011)

Gummy Song Fetus is a three-track EP by the Flaming Lips, consisting of a USB drive embedded inside a gummy fetus. It was first hand-delivered to Love Garden record store in Lawrence, Kansas by Wayne Coyne before its official release date of June 25, 2011, where the early gummy fetuses sold out quickly. Being that the gummy fetuses are smaller than the $150 Gummy Skulls released previously in April 2011, they were originally priced at $30, as opposed to the former's price. Songs were recorded at Tarbox Road Studios in Cassadaga, New York, Steven's computer, Michael's musical M.A.S.H., and Wayne's house in Oklahoma City, Oklahoma, March–May 2011.

== Track listing ==
All tracks are written by Derek Brown, Kliph Scurlock, Michael Ivins, Steven Drozd, and Wayne Coyne.

No.	Title	Length
1.	"Enthusiasm for Life Defeats Existential Fear Part 2"	5:05
2.	"Steven's Moonbow"	1:26
3.	"Squishy Glass"	5:59
