= With a Little Help from My Fwends =

2014 album by the Flaming Lips

Studio album by the Flaming Lips
- Released: October 27, 2014
- Genres: Psychedelic rock; neo-psychedelia
- Label: Warner Bros.
- Producers: Scott Booker, the Flaming Lips

The Flaming Lips chronology
The Time Has Come to Shoot You Down... What a Sound (2013)	With a Little Help from My Fwends (2014)	Oczy Mlody (2017)

Professional ratings
Aggregate scores
Source	Rating
Metacritic	59/100
Review scores
Source	Rating
AllMusic	3.5/5 stars
Billboard	3.5/5 stars
Consequence of Sound	C
The 405	8/10
The Line of Best Fit	6.5/10
NME	7/10
Pitchfork	5.5/10
Slant Magazine	2/5 stars
Robert Christgau	A−

With a Little Help from My Fwends is the second main album of the "Fwends" series by American rock band the Flaming Lips. It is a track-for-track tribute to the Beatles album Sgt. Pepper's Lonely Hearts Club Band, with guest performers appearing on each song. It was released on October 27, 2014, through Warner Bros. Records. All proceeds from record sales went to the Bella Foundation, an organization in Oklahoma City that helps provide veterinary care to pet owners in need.

== Track listing ==
All tracks are written by Lennon–McCartney except "Within You Without You", by George Harrison.

No.	Title	Featured	Length
1.	"Sgt. Pepper's Lonely Hearts Club Band"	My Morning Jacket, Fever the Ghost & J Mascis	2:45
2.	"With a Little Help from My Friends"	Black Pus & Autumn Defense	3:33
3.	"Lucy in the Sky with Diamonds"	Miley Cyrus & Moby	5:41
4.	"Getting Better"	Dr. Dog, Chuck Inglish & Morgan Delt	4:07
5.	"Fixing a Hole"	Electric Würms	3:48
6.	"She's Leaving Home"	Phantogram, Julianna Barwick & Spaceface	3:12
7.	"Being for the Benefit of Mr. Kite!"	Maynard James Keenan, Puscifer & Sunbears!	2:34
8.	"Within You Without You"	Birdflower & Morgan Delt	4:39
9.	"When I'm Sixty-Four"	Def Rain & Pitchwafuzz	3:19
10.	"Lovely Rita"	Tegan and Sara & Stardeath and White Dwarfs	4:18
11.	"Good Morning Good Morning"	Zorch, Grace Potter & Treasure Mammal	3:14
12.	"Sgt. Pepper's Lonely Hearts Club Band (Reprise)"	Foxygen & Ben Goldwasser	5:14
13.	"A Day in the Life"	Miley Cyrus & New Fumes	4:55
Total length:			51:24

== Charts ==
Chart performance for With a Little Help from My Fwends
Chart (2014)	Peak position
Belgian Albums (Ultratop Flanders)	108
Scottish Albums (Official Charts)	80
UK Albums (Official Charts)	84
US Billboard 200	58
US Top Alternative Albums (Billboard)	3
US Top Rock Albums (Billboard)	10
