= It Overtakes Me =

EP by The Flaming Lips
- Released: November 13, 2006
- Recorded: 2004–2006
- Genre: Indie rock
- Length: 15:49
- Label: Warner Bros.
- Producer: The Flaming Lips, Dave Fridmann, Scott Booker

The Flaming Lips EP chronology
Ego Tripping at the Gates of Hell (2003)	It Overtakes Me (2006)	The Flaming Lips with Neon Indian (2011)

"It Overtakes Me" (extended title: "It Overtakes Me / The Stars Are So Big... I Am So Small... Do I Stand a Chance?") is a song by The Flaming Lips, and the title track of a four-track EP of the same name, released on November 13, 2006.

The EP contains a shorter version of the song featured on At War with the Mystics, with the "Stars Are So Big..." segment omitted. "It Overtakes Me" received some exposure in the United Kingdom due to its inclusion in a television commercial for Beck's in mid-2006.

== Track listing ==
No.	Title	Length
1.	"It Overtakes Me" (Radio edit)	3:15
2.	"I'm Afraid of Dying... Aren't You?" (Uses the main riff from the chorus of "It Overtakes Me" as a main theme)	4:08
3.	"Free Radicals" (The Bird and the Bee Mix)	5:13
4.	"Time Travel?? Yes!!" (With Steven Michael Burns. Is a different version of the track on "The Yeah Yeah Yeah Song (With All Your Power)" and "The W.A.N.D. (The Will Always Negates Defeat)" single)	3:12

== Charts ==
Chart performance for "It Overtakes Me"
Chart (2006)	Peak position
UK Downloads (OCC)	155
