= The W.A.N.D. (The Will Always Negates Defeat) =

Single by The Flaming Lips

from the album At War with the Mystics
- Released: January 10, 2006 (US); July 17, 2006 (UK)
- Recorded: 2004–2006
- Genre: Alternative rock
- Length: 3:42
- Label: Warner Bros.
- Songwriter(s): Wayne Coyne; Michael Ivins; Steven Drozd
- Producer(s): The Flaming Lips; Dave Fridmann; Scott Booker

The Flaming Lips singles chronology
"The Golden Path" (2003)	"The W.A.N.D. (The Will Always Negates Defeat)" (2006)	"The Yeah Yeah Yeah Song (With All Your Power)" (2006)

"The W.A.N.D. (The Will Always Negates Defeat)" (usually shortened to "W.A.N.D.") is a song by The Flaming Lips, featured on their 2006 album At War with the Mystics.

== Release information ==
"The W.A.N.D." was initially released on online stores such as the iTunes Music Store on January 10, 2006.

On 7 March that year, a CD single for the track was released in the United States, featuring two unreleased B-sides: a new studio version of "You Got to Hold On" (which would later appear in an online advertisement for Coca-Cola) and "Time Travel... Yes!!" featuring a digitally altered Steve Burns delivering a spoken monologue about time travel.

Again in 2006, it was released as a commercial single in the United Kingdom on July 17, but failed to enter the top 40, peaking at #41.

"The W.A.N.D." was first performed live at the Langerado Music Festival in Fort Lauderdale, Florida on March 11, 2006.

The song was featured in the Dell Inspiron commercials released in early 2007 and can be heard as part of the Major League Baseball 2K8 soundtrack.

== Music video ==
There are two music videos, one for MTV and an alternate version, which is a slow-motion reverse pillow fight between two members of TXRD Lonestar Rollergirls, Lux and Venis Envy. Captions ask at the end: "Are these two women really fighting???" and "And if they were, would that be cool??".

== Track listing ==
US CD

1. "The W.A.N.D."
2. "You Got to Hold On"
3. "Time Travel... Yes!!"
  - This is a different version than the song of the same name on the "It Overtakes Me" EP.

UK 7-inch picture disc

1. "The W.A.N.D." (Album version)
2. "You Got to Hold On"

UK CD 1

1. "The W.A.N.D." (Album version)
2. "The W.A.N.D." (Supernaturalistic – Goldfrapp remix)

UK CD 2

1. "The W.A.N.D."
2. "You Gotta Hold On"
3. "The Yeah Yeah Yeah Song (In Anatropous Reflex)"
4. "The W.A.N.D." (Music video)

== Charts ==
Chart (2006)	Peak position
UK Singles (OCC)	41
US Bubbling Under Hot 100 (Billboard)	8
US Hot Singles Sales (Billboard)	6
US Pop 100 (Billboard)	81

== Use in popular media ==
"The W.A.N.D." is used in the Dell Inspiron commercial advertising their new Inspirons in different colors.

In Lakai's 2007 video Fully Flared, the song is used in Cairo Foster's part.

The song is featured on the NBA 2K16 soundtrack.

The song was used as the theme for the fan-made title sequence for the 2016 film Doctor Strange.

The song was used in the Netflix series Outer Banks.
