= The Flaming Lips with Lightning Bolt =

EP by: The Flaming Lips; Lightning Bolt
- Released: July 26, 2011
- Genre: Noise; psychedelia
- Length: 22:16
- Label: Warner Bros.; Lovely Sorts of Death

Flaming Lips EP chronology
Gummy Song Fetus (2011)	The Flaming Lips with Lightning Bolt (2011)	Strobo Trip (2011)

The Flaming Lips with Lightning Bolt is a collaborative EP by The Flaming Lips and Lightning Bolt, released in 2011. The four-track EP includes four tracks ranging in length from six to eleven minutes. The first two tracks are credited to The Flaming Lips with Lightning Bolt, while the latter two are credited to Lightning Bolt with The Flaming Lips.

== Critical reception ==
Professional ratings
Review scores
Source	Rating
PopMatters	5/10 discs
Tiny Mix Tapes	3.5/5 marks

Upon release, The Flaming Lips with Lightning Bolt was greeted with a mixed critical reaction.

== Track listing ==
Side A: The Flaming Lips w/ Lightning Bolt
No.	Title	Length
1.	"I'm Working at NASA on Acid"	8:02
2.	"I Want to Get High But I Don't Want Brain Damage"	4:46

Side B: Lightning Bolt w/ The Flaming Lips
No.	Title	Length
3.	"NASA's Final Acid Bath"	5:00
4.	"I Want to Get Damaged But I Won't Say Hi"	4:28

Track listing adapted from AllMusic and Stereogum.
