= Due to High Expectations... The Flaming Lips Are Providing Needles for Your Balloons =

Due to High Expectations... The Flaming Lips are Providing Needles for Your Balloons

Compilation album by The Flaming Lips
- Released: June 1994
- Recorded: Summer 1992 – April 1994
- Genre: Alternative rock
- Length: 44:09
- Label: Warner Bros.
- Producer: The Flaming Lips, Keith Cleversley

The Flaming Lips EP chronology
Yeah, I Know It's a Drag... But Wastin' Pigs Is Still Radical (1991)	Due to High Expectations... The Flaming Lips are Providing Needles for Your Balloons (1994)	The Southern Oklahoma Cosmic Trigger Contest (2001)

Professional ratings
Review scores
Source	Rating
Allmusic	3/5 stars

Due to High Expectations... The Flaming Lips are Providing Needles for Your Balloons (usually referred to as Providing Needles for Your Balloons) is a compilation record released by the American rock group The Flaming Lips in 1994.

According to the band's website, it was released because there had been new albums in 1992 and 1993, but there would not be one in 1994, thus the fans were expecting new Lips material. This is probably due to the success of Transmissions from the Satellite Heart and the band's extensive promotion of that album. Released as an EP, it is a collection of unreleased studio and live recordings, some of which are covers. Despite being categorized as an EP, the release runs as long as a full album. The artwork reflects the graphic themes of Transmissions from the Satellite Heart.

== Track listing ==
No.	Title	Length
1.	"Bad Days"	4:35
2.	"Jets Part 2 (My Two Days as an Ambulance Driver)"	3:50
3.	"Ice Drummer"	4:25
4.	"Put the Waterbug in the Policeman's Ear"	5:20
5.	"Chewin' the Apple of Yer Eye"	5:26
6.	"Chosen One"	7:28
7.	"Little Drummer Boy"	5:28
8.	"Slow Nerve Action"	7:33
9.	"Steven's Weird Thing" (Hidden track)

== Further credits ==
1. Recorded in April 1994 by Keith Cleversley. Different mix from Clouds Taste Metallic version.
2. Part one can be found on the previous EP, Yeah, I Know It's a Drag... But Wastin' Pigs Is Still Radical.
3. Recorded for a Suicide tribute album.
4. Song about Wayne's brother's experience shopping at a grocery store while high.
5. Recorded live at Northern Lights record store in Minneapolis December 6, 1993.
6. Recorded live at Northern Lights record store in Minneapolis December 6, 1993. Smog cover.
7. Recorded live at Northern Lights record store in Minneapolis December 6, 1993. Katherine Kennicott Davis cover.
8. Radio broadcast, March 1994.
9. Hidden track: A short instrumental which would appear in its finished form on Zaireeka as "The Train Runs over the Camel but Is Derailed by the Gnat".
