= Telepathic Surgery =

Studio album by the Flaming Lips
- Released: February 1989
- Recorded: 1988
- Studio: Goodnite Audio, Dallas
- Genre: Alternative rock; noise rock; neo-psychedelia
- Length: 38:42; 64:37 (CD issue); 61:57 (2 Disc(3 sides) Vinyl issue)
- Label: Restless/Enigma; 1877-72350-2
- Producer: Wayne Coyne, Richard English, Michael Ivins

The Flaming Lips chronology
Oh My Gawd!!! (1987)	Telepathic Surgery (1989)	In a Priest Driven Ambulance (1990)

Singles from Telepathic Surgery
- 1. "Drug Machine in Heaven" Released: February 1989

Professional ratings
Review scores
Source	Rating
AllMusic	2.5/5 stars
The Encyclopedia of Popular Music	2/5 stars
The Great Rock Discography	5/10
MusicHound Rock	2.5/5 stars
NME	9/10
Paste	6.9/10
(The New) Rolling Stone Album Guide	3/5 stars

Telepathic Surgery is the third studio album by American rock band the Flaming Lips, released in February 1989. It is the final album with drummer Richard English.

== Overview ==
Telepathic Surgery began life as a concept album; the band initially set out to create a 30-minute sound collage. The plan was later scrapped; however, the remnants of this original idea are evident within the album's loose, meandering structure and the epic "Hell's Angel's Cracker Factory". The album is named after a line from the song "Chrome Plated Suicide".

"Chrome Plated Suicide" stands out as one of the group's most accomplished early recordings, possibly due to being based on Guns N' Roses' critically acclaimed "Sweet Child o' Mine". Sub Pop asked the group to record "Drug Machine in Heaven" for their 'single of the month' series. It was retitled as "Drug Machine" and is the group's first official single. The 'A-side' was backed with "Strychnine/What's So Funny (About Peace, Love and Understanding)", a cover of "Strychnine" by The Sonics and "(What's So Funny 'Bout) Peace, Love, and Understanding" by Brinsley Schwarz, but based on the Elvis Costello and the Attractions cover version.

Similar to many albums of its time, the CD release of Telepathic Surgery had a track listing differing from its LP release due to the time restraints of a single vinyl LP. Extra tracks on CD versions were "Fryin' Up" and "Hell's Angel's Cracker Factory", which are included in between "Miracle on 42nd Street and "U.F.O. Story".

== Reissue ==
The album was reissued and remastered as part of the Finally the Punk Rockers Are Taking Acid boxset in 2002, which included the extra tracks from the CD but "Hell's Angels Cracker Factory" was amended to just over three minutes in length.

Telepathic Surgery was reissued in limited quantities in 2005 on blue vinyl. The reissue is on 3 sides and contains the bonus track "Hell's Angels Cracker Factory", a 23-minute song with backward vocals and long guitar solos. The cover depicts promotional photos including the band standing in front of a staged fatal car crash. The inside sleeve contains a story about the early Lips by Michael Ivins, then bassist of the Flaming Lips.

== Track listing ==
=== Original release ===
Side A
No.	Title	Length
1.	"Drug Machine in Heaven"	2:11
2.	"Right Now"	3:55
3.	"Michael, Time to Wake Up"	0:30
4.	"Chrome Plated Suicide"	5:39
5.	"Hari-Krishna Stomp Wagon (Fuck Led Zeppelin)"	3:54
6.	"Miracle on 42nd Street"	2:36

Side B
No.	Title	Length
7.	"U.F.O Story"	6:33
8.	"Redneck School of Technology"	2:55
9.	"Shaved Gorilla"	2:54
10.	"The Spontaneous Combustion of John"	0:52
11.	"The Last Drop of Morning Dew"	1:59
12.	"Begs and Achin'"	4:17

Side C
No.	Title	Length
13.	"Hell's Angel's Cracker Factory" (Only included on 2005 editions)	23:02

=== CD ===
No.	Title	Length
1.	"Drug Machine in Heaven"	2:11
2.	"Right Now"	3:57
3.	"Michael, Time to Wake Up"	0:29
4.	"Chrome Plated Suicide"	5:41
5.	"Hari-Krishna Stomp Wagon (Fuck Led Zeppelin)"	3:45
6.	"Miracle on 42nd Street"	2:48
7.	"Fryin' Up"	2:40
8.	"Hell's Angel's Cracker Factory"	23:02
9.	"U.F.O Story"	6:41
10.	"Redneck School of Technology"	2:46
11.	"Shaved Gorilla"	2:58
12.	"The Spontaneous Combustion of John"	0:53
13.	"The Last Drop of Morning Dew"	1:58
14.	"Begs and Achin'"	4:24

== Personnel ==
- Wayne Coyne – lead vocals, guitar
- Michael Ivins – bass, backing vocals
- Richard English – drums, backing vocals, keyboards
- Produced by The Flaming Lips
- Ruben Ayala – recording engineer
- Craig 'Niteman' Taylor – harmonica
- Michelle Martin – photography
- Michele Vlasimsky – layout design, photography
