= At War with the Mystics =

Studio album by the Flaming Lips
- Released: April 3, 2006
- Recorded: June 2004 – January 2006
- Studios: Tarbox Road Studios, Cassadaga, New York
- Genres: Psychedelic rock; dream pop; neo-psychedelia; space rock
- Length: 54:53
- Label: Warner Bros.
- Producers: The Flaming Lips; Dave Fridmann; Scott Booker

The Flaming Lips chronology
Yoshimi Battles the Pink Robots (2002)	At War with the Mystics (2006)	Atlas Eets Christmas (2007)

Singles from At War with the Mystics
- 1. "The W.A.N.D. (The Will Always Negates Defeat)" Released: January 10, 2006; 2. "The Yeah Yeah Yeah Song (With All Your Power)" Released: April 17, 2006; 3. "It Overtakes Me" Released: November 13, 2006

Professional ratings
Aggregate scores
Source	Rating
Metacritic	76/100
Review scores
Source	Rating
AllMusic	3.5/5 stars
Entertainment Weekly	B
The Guardian	4/5 stars
The Independent	5/5 stars
Los Angeles Times	3.5/4 stars
NME	8/10
Pitchfork	6.7/10
Q	4/5 stars
Rolling Stone	3/5 stars
Spin	B+

At War with the Mystics is the eleventh studio album by American rock band the Flaming Lips, released on April 3, 2006, by Warner Bros. Records. The album is more guitar-driven and features more politically themed lyrics than the band's previous two albums The Soft Bulletin (1999) and Yoshimi Battles the Pink Robots (2002). It is the group's first album featuring contributions from drummer Kliph Scurlock despite not being credited alongside the rest of the band until the following album, Embryonic.

At War with the Mystics won a 2006 Grammy Award for Best Rock Instrumental Performance and Best Engineered Album, Non-Classical, and was also nominated for Best Alternative Album. By 2009, the album had sold over 220,000 copies in the United States, according to Nielsen SoundScan.

== Track listing ==
All tracks are written by The Flaming Lips.

No.	Title	Length
1.	"The Yeah Yeah Yeah Song (With All Your Power)"	4:51
2.	"Free Radicals (A Hallucination of the Christmas Skeleton Pleading with a Suicide Bomber)"	3:39
3.	"The Sound of Failure / It's Dark... Is It Always This Dark??"	7:18
4.	"My Cosmic Autumn Rebellion (The Inner Life as Blazing Shield of Defiance and Optimism as Celestial Spear of Action)"	4:48
5.	"Vein of Stars"	4:15
6.	"The Wizard Turns On... The Giant Silver Flashlight and Puts on His Werewolf Moccasins"	3:41
7.	"It Overtakes Me / The Stars Are So Big... I Am So Small... Do I Stand a Chance?"	6:50
8.	"Mr. Ambulance Driver"	4:21
9.	"Haven't Got a Clue"	3:23
10.	"The W.A.N.D. (The Will Always Negates Defeat)"	3:44
11.	"Pompeii am Götterdämmerung"	4:22
12.	"Goin' On"	3:39
Total length:		54:53

iTunes exclusive bonus tracks
No.	Title	Length
13.	"Bohemian Rhapsody" (This track originally appeared on Killer Queen: A Tribute to Queen)	6:36
14.	"The Gold in the Mountain of Our Madness" (Also appears as the final track on the Japanese import version)	4:47
15.	"The Yeah Yeah Yeah Song" (Long version)	5:22
16.	"Time Travel...YES!!" (Non-album track, featuring Steven Michael Burns)	3:21

== 5.1 audio mix ==
Like The Soft Bulletin and Yoshimi, At War with the Mystics was released as a special edition 5.1 CD+DVD-Audio mix on October 24, 2006, accompanied by studio outtakes, videos, and exclusive radio sessions.

No.	Title	Length
1.	"The Yeah Yeah Yeah Song (With All Your Power)"	5:22
2.	"Free Radicals (A Hallucination of the Christmas Skeleton Pleading with a Suicide Bomber)"	3:40
3.	"The Sound of Failure / It's Dark... Is It Always This Dark??"	7:18
4.	"My Cosmic Autumn Rebellion (The Inner Life as Blazing Shield of Defiance and Optimism as Celestial Spear of Action)"	5:01
5.	"Vein of Stars"	4:15
6.	"The Wizard Turns On... The Giant Silver Flashlight And Puts On His Werewolf Moccasins"	3:45
7.	"It Overtakes Me / The Stars Are So Big... I Am So Small... Do I Stand a Chance?"	6:55
8.	"Mr. Ambulance Driver"	4:22
9.	"Haven't Got a Clue"	3:23
10.	"The W.A.N.D. (The Will Always Negates Defeat)"	3:43
11.	"Pompeii am Götterdämmerung"	4:22
12.	"Goin' On"	3:37

=== Outtakes ===
No.	Title	Length
1.	"Why Does It End?"	4:38
2.	"You Gotta Hold On"	4:52
3.	"Your Face Can Tell the Future"	5:21
4.	"The Gold in the Mountain of Our Madness"	4:48
5.	"Time Travel?? Yes!!"	3:23
6.	"Bohemian Rhapsody"	6:36

=== Radio sessions ===
No.	Title	Length
1.	"My Cosmic Autumn Rebellion"	4:40
2.	"Goin' On"	3:44
3.	"Unmade Bed / No Quarter"	6:56
4.	"The Sound of Failure"	4:03
5.	"Vein of Stars"	4:50
6.	"Vein of Stars" (Operatic Spook)	4:15
7.	"The Yeah Yeah Yeah Song" (Chicken Fried Hoedown Protest Rally)	4:44
8.	"The Yeah Yeah Yeah Song" (In Anatropous Reflex)	4:22

=== Videos ===
No.	Title	Length
1.	"Mr. Ambulance Driver"	5:00
2.	"The Yeah Yeah Yeah Song"	4:06
3.	"The W.A.N.D."	3:48
4.	"2006 OKC Classen High Commencement Speech"	12:18

== Personnel ==
The Flaming Lips

- Wayne Coyne – vocals, guitars, keyboards, mixing, production
- Steven Drozd – guitars, bass, keyboards, drums, vocals, mixing, production
- Michael Ivins – bass, keyboards, backing vocals, mixing, production, additional engineering

Additional member

- Kliph Scurlock – drums, percussion

Additional personnel

- Scott Booker – production
- Dave Fridmann – additional songwriting, production, mixing, programming, engineering, mastering
- Greg Kurstin – additional songwriting, production, backing vocals and instruments on "Haven't Got a Clue"

== Charts ==
=== Weekly charts ===
Chart (2006)	Peak position
Australian Albums (ARIA)	20
Belgian Albums (Ultratop Flanders)	47
Danish Albums (Hitlisten)	20
Dutch Albums (Album Top 100)	82
Finnish Albums (Suomen virallinen lista)	25
French Albums (SNEP)	151
Irish Albums (IRMA)	6
Italian Albums (FIMI)	78
New Zealand Albums (RMNZ)	36
Norwegian Albums (VG-lista)	14
Scottish Albums (Official Charts)	7
Swedish Albums (Sverigetopplistan)	32
UK Albums (Official Charts)	6
US Billboard 200	11
US Top Rock Albums (Billboard)	2

=== Year-end charts ===
Chart (2006)	Position
UK Albums (OCC)	196
