= The Yeah Yeah Yeah Song (With All Your Power) =

Single by The Flaming Lips

from the album At War with the Mystics
- Released: April 17, 2006
- Recorded: 2004–2005
- Genre: Pop rock, psychedelic rock
- Length: 4:55 (album version); 5:22 (full version)
- Label: Warner Bros.
- Songwriters: Wayne Coyne, Michael Ivins, Steven Drozd
- Producers: The Flaming Lips, Dave Fridmann, Scott Booker

The Flaming Lips singles chronology
"The W.A.N.D. (The Will Always Negates Defeat)" (2006)	"The Yeah Yeah Yeah Song (With All Your Power)" (2006)	"It Overtakes Me EP" (2006)

"The Yeah Yeah Yeah Song (With All Your Power)" is a song by The Flaming Lips, released as the second single from their 2006 album At War with the Mystics. It is their highest-charting single so far in the UK, peaking at #16.

== About the song ==
The theme of the lyrics is more political than their earlier material, as it asks listeners what they would do if they had all the power in the world. The questions asked are answered by a chorus of repetitive "yeah"s in the first verse and "no"s for the second verse. Wayne Coyne has repeatedly stated that the song does not directly refer to George W. Bush, as members of the media have speculated, but serves as a general statement about abuse of power. Coyne summarized his intended interpretation to the band's audience at the Austin City Limits Music Festival that "Power is like money. It should be earned, not given to you."

This song was used in Intel's "Raise Your Hand" ad campaign, which features text question over shots of people in various settings raising their hand while the chorus "Yeah Yeah Yeah" was repeated. It was also used over the opening scenes and credits of The Brothers Solomon. A 2008 television commercial for a Kraft salad dressing features this song in the background, as does a wind power commercial for the group's hometown utility company, OG&E (Oklahoma Gas & Electric), in which Coyne appears along with other Oklahoma luminaries and representatives of the general public. The song was also used in the trailer for the film Moving McAllister, as well as the movie I Love You, Man, and the pilot for the Fox show Sons of Tucson. It was also featured on a commercial in late 2006 for Cartoon Network's Squirrel Boy, and in the soundtrack of the game FIFA Street 2. It has been also included in the 2024 animated movie Orion and the Dark.

=== Wayne Coyne's view on the song ===
"Steven had been recording in a separate vocal booth on his computer and I walked by and heard the crazy grouped vocals doing the "yeah yeah yeah" part and I was immediately hooked. This is one of those songs that points the finger at the pettiness of those in power but also points the finger back at ourselves - what would YOU do? Power in the hands of the inexperienced (which is what we would be) is very dangerous..."

== Music video ==
The music video has three segments. In the first, Asian women forcibly tape hamburgers to a businessman and then he is let loose, chased by several shirtless obese men and watched by amused but non-interfering police officers, played by Flaming Lips members Michael Ivins, Steven Drozd and Kliph Scurlock. In the second segment, a woman is similarly covered by doughnuts and is chased by the police officers. In the third segment, frontman Wayne Coyne - who portrays a ruthless leader - has raw steaks and some lengths of intestine stapled to him and gets chased by a werewolf.

== UK track listings ==
- 7"
1. "The Yeah Yeah Yeah Song"
2. "Why Does It End?"
- CD
1. "The Yeah Yeah Yeah Song"
2. "The Gold in the Mountain of Our Madness"
- Maxi-CD
1. "The Yeah Yeah Yeah Song"
2. "Time Travel...YES!!!"
  - This is not the same version of the song on the "It Overtakes Me" EP.
3. "Why Does It End?"
4. "The Yeah Yeah Yeah Song" (Music video)

== Australian track listing ==
- Maxi-CD
1. "The Yeah Yeah Yeah Song"
2. "The W.A.N.D."
3. "The Gold in the Mountain of Our Madness"
4. "Why Does It End?"

== Chart positions ==
Chart (2006)	Peak position
Australian ARIA Singles Chart	79
UK Singles Chart	16
U.S. Billboard European Hot 100 Singles	48
