= Nell Smith =

Canadian-based singer-songwriter (2007–2024)

Nell Smith (July 17, 2007 – October 6, 2024) was a Canadian-based musician best known for her collaboration with the Flaming Lips on the 2021 Nick Cave covers album Where the Viaduct Looms. Signed to Bella Union, she was working on her debut solo album, Anxious, at the time of her death, which was released posthumously in 2025.

== Early life ==
Smith was born in Leeds, England, and moved to Canada with her family when she was five years old. She grew up in Fernie, British Columbia.

Smith attended music festivals and concerts with her parents and developed an early interest in music. As a child and early teenager, she frequently attended shows by the Flaming Lips, often standing at the front of the stage and singing along.

== Career ==
=== Collaboration with the Flaming Lips ===
Smith’s musical career began following a chance encounter with Flaming Lips frontman Wayne Coyne at a concert in Calgary in 2018. After recognizing Smith from previous shows, Coyne stayed in contact with her and encouraged her to develop her songwriting and guitar skills.

During the COVID-19 pandemic, plans for Smith to record with the band in Oklahoma were postponed. Instead, she recorded vocal tracks remotely, which the Flaming Lips arranged and produced. The resulting album, Where the Viaduct Looms (2021), consisted of nine cover versions of songs by Nick Cave and was released by Bella Union. The album received attention for Smith’s vocal performances, including praise from Cave himself.

=== Solo work ===
Following Where the Viaduct Looms, Smith signed with Bella Union and began work on her debut solo album. The album was recorded in Brighton, England, with Jack and Lily Wolter of the band Penelope Isles, and was nearing completion at the time of her death.

Smith’s solo debut album, Anxious, was released posthumously in 2025. Reviewing the album for Spin, Brendan Hay described it as optimistic and imaginative, highlighting Smith's songwriting and vocal presence.

== Death ==
Smith died in October 2024 at the age of 17 after being killed in a car accident in Alberta. Tributes were paid by Wayne Coyne during Flaming Lips concerts shortly after her death.

== Discography ==
=== Albums ===
- Where the Viaduct Looms (with the Flaming Lips, 2021)
- Anxious (2025)
