= Race for the Prize =

Single by The Flaming Lips

from the album The Soft Bulletin
- Released: June 1999
- Recorded: 1999
- Genre: Neo-psychedelia; symphonic pop
- Length: 4:09
- Label: Warner Bros.
- Songwriter(s): Wayne Coyne, Michael Ivins, Steven Drozd
- Producer(s): The Flaming Lips, Dave Fridmann, Scott Booker

The Flaming Lips singles chronology
"Brainville" (1996)	"Race for the Prize" (1999)	"Waitin' for a Superman" (1999)

"Race for the Prize" (subtitled "Sacrifice of the New Scientists"), is a song by The Flaming Lips, released as the first single taken from their 1999 album The Soft Bulletin, and reaching #39 in the UK Singles Chart as the highest-charting single from the album. In 2010 Pitchfork Media included the song at number 30 on their Top 200 Tracks of the 90s. The song is also played live frequently, and is usually featured as a set opener for many of their concerts.

== Single release ==
The single, released in 1999, was the album's highest-charting single, reaching the top 40 at #39.

The b-side of the UK release featured material previously featured in Flaming Lips U.S. releases.

The single's b-sides both featured in the Japanese and UK single releases, "Riding to Work in the Year 2025 (Your Invisible Now)" and "Thirty-Five Thousand Feet of Despair" later appeared in CD5 of the U.S. release of the album's subsequent single "Waitin' for a Superman."

== Track listing ==
UK CD1

1. "Race for the Prize"
2. "Riding to Work in the Year 2025 (Your Invisible Now)" (From Zaireeka CD No.1)
3. "Thirty-Five Thousand Feet of Despair" (From Zaireeka CD No.1)

UK CD2

1. "Race for the Prize"
2. "Riding to Work in the Year 2025 (Your Invisible Now)" (From Zaireeka CD No.2)
3. "Thirty-Five Thousand Feet of Despair" (From Zaireeka CD No.2)

Japan CD

1. "Race for the Prize"
2. "Race For the Prize" (Remix)
3. "Riding to Work in the Year 2025 (Your Invisible Now)" (Stereo remix)
4. "Thirty-Five Thousand Feet of Despair" (Stereo remix)
5. "The Big Ol' Bug Is the New Baby Now" (Stereo remix)

== Chart positions ==
Chart (1999)	Peak position
UK Singles Chart	39

== Oklahoma City Thunder fight song ==
In 2012, the band rewrote some of the lyrics to the song to make a fight song for their hometown NBA team: the Oklahoma City Thunder. The new song is called "Thunder Up: Race for the Prize." The Thunder played in the NBA Finals that year.
