= Taylor-Johnson =

Taylor-Johnson is a surname and may refer to:

- Aaron Taylor-Johnson (born 1990), British actor
- Sam Taylor-Johnson (née Taylor-Woods; born 1967), British filmmaker, photographer and visual artist

== Other ==
- Taylor–Johnson Temperament Analysis, a personality test
