= Waitin' for a Superman =

Single by The Flaming Lips

from the album The Soft Bulletin
- B-side: "Thirty-Five Thousand Feet of Despair"; "Riding to Work in the Year 2025 (Your Invisible Now)"
- Released: October 1999
- Recorded: 1999
- Genre: Symphonic pop
- Length: 4:17
- Label: Warner Bros.
- Songwriters: Wayne Coyne, Michael Ivins, Steven Drozd
- Producers: The Flaming Lips, Dave Fridmann, Scott Booker

The Flaming Lips singles chronology
| "Race for the Prize" (1999) | "Waitin' for a Superman" (1999) | "Do You Realize??" (2002) |

"Waitin' for a Superman" (subtitled "Is It Gettin' Heavy??" for the song's U.S. album release) is a song by The Flaming Lips, released as the second single taken from their 1999 album The Soft Bulletin, and reaching No. 73 in the UK Singles Chart.

During a live performance in Dublin in April 2025, singer Wayne Coyne explained that the song was inspired by a childhood friend who died of leukemia aged 10.

== Single release ==
The b-sides of the UK release complete the 4-CD set for "Thirty-Five Thousand Feet of Despair" and "Riding to Work in the Year 2025." The first two CD parts for these songs can be found on the two UK "Race for the Prize" singles.

The U.S. release features material from the UK release of "Race for the Prize."

The song was also released by UK band Fightstar.

David Bazan has been known to cover this song live.

Coldplay covered the song live at a show in Oklahoma, the home state of the Flaming Lips, on the Viva la Vida Tour in 2008.

Iron & Wine included an acoustic cover of the song on the album "Around the Well" in 2009.

Scott Weiland covered the song on the album "A Compilation of Scott Weiland Cover Songs" in 2011.

== Track listing ==
US CD

1. "Waitin' for a Superman (Is It Gettin' Heavy??)" (Radio edit)
2. "Waitin' for a Superman" (Album version)
3. "Waitin' for a Superman" (Mokran remix)
4. "Thirty-Five Thousand Feet of Despair" (Stereo remix)
5. "Riding to Work in the Year 2025 (Your Invisible Now) (Stereo remix)
6. QuickTime-accessible music videos for "Waitin' for a Superman", "Race for the Prize", and "Be My Head".

UK CD1

1. "Waitin' for a Superman" (Radio edit)
2. "Riding to Work in the Year 2025 (Your Invisible Now)" (From Zaireeka CD No.3)
3. "Thirty-Five Thousand Feet of Despair" (From Zaireeka CD No.3)

UK CD2

1. "Waitin' for a Superman" (Radio edit)
2. "Riding to Work in the Year 2025 (Your Invisible Now)" (From Zaireeka CD No.4)
3. "Thirty-Five Thousand Feet of Despair" (From Zaireeka CD No.4)

== Chart performance ==
| Chart (1999) | Peak position |
|---|---|
| UK Singles Chart | 73 |
