= The Day They Shot a Hole in the Jesus Egg =

Compilation album by The Flaming Lips
- Released: October 1, 2002
- Recorded: 1989–1991
- Genre: Alternative rock
- Length: 139:46
- Label: Restless
- Producer: The Flaming Lips, Dave Fridmann

The Flaming Lips compilation chronology
Finally the Punk Rockers Are Taking Acid (2002)	The Day They Shot a Hole in the Jesus Egg (2002)	Shambolic Birth and Early Life Of (2002)

Professional ratings
Review scores
Source	Rating
Allmusic	4.5/5 stars
The Rolling Stone Album Guide	3/5 stars

The Day They Shot a Hole in the Jesus Egg (subtitled The Priest Driven Ambulance Album, Demos, and Outtakes, 1989-1991) is a 2xCD compilation of material by the Flaming Lips released by Restless Records in late 2002. It is the second of two reissues compiling the band's work with the record label, and follows Finally the Punk Rockers Are Taking Acid.

The first disc contains the album In a Priest Driven Ambulance, followed by related B-sides from that era. The second disc contains a much-bootlegged series of demos called The Mushroom Tapes, featuring early versions and alternate mixes of Ambulance tracks.

The first disc of this set was released on vinyl as a limited-edition, pink-colored two-record set under the title of In a Priest Driven Ambulance.

The compilation is named after a line from the Flaming Lips song "Five Stop Mother Superior Rain". It also includes new liner notes from band frontman Wayne Coyne.

== Track listing ==
=== Disc one ===
In a Priest Driven Ambulance
No.	Title	Length
1.	"Shine On Sweet Jesus - Jesus Song No.5"	4:27
2.	"Unconsciously Screamin'"	3:52
3.	"Rainin' Babies"	4:28
4.	"Take Meta Mars"	3:13
5.	"Five Stop Mother Superior Rain"	6:19
6.	"Stand In Line"	4:36
7.	"God Walks Among Us Now - Jesus Song No.6"	4:53
8.	"There You Are - Jesus Song No.7"	4:31
9.	"Mountain Side"	6:36
10.	"(What A) Wonderful World"	3:41

Bonus tracks
No.	Title	Length
11.	"Lucifer Rising"	3:35
12.	"Ma, I Didn't Notice"	8:10
13.	"Let Me Be It"	5:32
14.	"Drug Machine"	2:53
15.	"Strychnine/Peace, Love, & Understanding"	3:59

=== Disc two ===
The Mushroom Tapes
No.	Title	Length
1.	"Take Meta Mars"	2:45
2.	"Mountain Side"	3:14
3.	"There You Are - Jesus Song No.7"	3:41
4.	"Five Stop Mother Superior Rain"	3:05
5.	"Rainin' Babies"	2:30
6.	"Unconsciously Screamin'"	3:18
7.	"Stand In Line"	4:13
8.	"God's a Wheeler Dealer"	2:43
9.	"Agonizing"	3:26
10.	"One Shot"	2:52
11.	"Cold Day"	2:44
12.	"Jam"	1:07

Bonus tracks
No.	Title	Length
13.	"She's Gone Mad"	9:15
14.	"Golden Hearse"	3:55
15.	"Unconsciously Screamin'" (Alternative Version)	3:53
16.	"Stand In Line" (Alternative Version)	6:34
17.	"I Want to Kill My Brother; The Cymbal Head"	3:38
18.	"Five Stop Mother Superior Rain" (Alternative Version)	6:05
