= The Southern Oklahoma Cosmic Trigger Contest =

EP by The Flaming Lips
- Released: 2001
- Recorded: 2000–2001
- Genre: Indie rock
- Length: 12:29
- Label: Independent
- Producer: The Flaming Lips

The Flaming Lips EP chronology
Due to High Expectations... The Flaming Lips Are Providing Needles for Your Balloons (1994)	The Southern Oklahoma Cosmic Trigger Contest (2001)	Fight Test (2003)

The Southern Oklahoma Cosmic Trigger Contest is a soundtrack by The Flaming Lips to the Bradley Beesley fishing documentary Okie Noodling, featuring three country-tinged songs not found elsewhere, two of which are instrumentals.

It was distributed as a promotional CD at early screenings of the film.

== Track listing ==
No.	Title	Length
1.	"The Southern Oklahoma Cosmic Trigger Contest"	7:31
2.	"Noodling Theme" (Epic Sunset Mix #5)	3:27
3.	"At the Fish Fry and the Bigot's Drunk"	1:31
