= Clouds Taste Metallic =

Studio album by The Flaming Lips
- Released: September 19, 1995
- Genres: Neo-psychedelia; alternative rock; noise pop
- Length: 47:31
- Label: Warner Bros.
- Producers: The Flaming Lips; Dave Fridmann

The Flaming Lips chronology
Transmissions from the Satellite Heart (1993)	Clouds Taste Metallic (1995)	Zaireeka (1997)

Singles from Clouds Taste Metallic
- 1. "Bad Days" Released: October 1995; 2. "This Here Giraffe" Released: February 1996; 3. "Brainville" Released: August 1996

Professional ratings
Review scores
Source	Rating
AllMusic	4.5/5 stars
Encyclopedia of Popular Music	4/5 stars
The Great Rock Discography	7/10
Los Angeles Times	3/4 stars
MusicHound	4.5/5
NME	5/10
The Philadelphia Inquirer	3.5/4 stars
Rolling Stone	3/5 stars
The Rolling Stone Album Guide	4/5 stars
Spin	7/10

Clouds Taste Metallic is the seventh studio album by American rock band the Flaming Lips, released on September 19, 1995, by Warner Bros. Records. It was the last album to feature guitarist Ronald Jones. The album's recording is heavily featured in the Fearless Freaks documentary.

Clouds Taste Metallic was projected to be the band's first commercially successful release after the major success of "She Don't Use Jelly" from their previous album Transmissions from the Satellite Heart (1993), but failed to garner the same commercial success of its predecessor. However, in recent years, it has been regarded by critics and fans as one of the Flaming Lips' best albums, and has achieved cult status.

The name of the album comes from a story by former Tool bassist Paul D'Amour, who, after being flown through a cloud in a roofless airplane, heard the pilot remark: "You know, it's weird, clouds taste metallic."

== Track listing ==
No.	Title	Length
1.	"The Abandoned Hospital Ship"	3:38
2.	"Psychiatric Explorations of the Fetus with Needles"	3:27
3.	"Placebo Headwound"	3:40
4.	"This Here Giraffe"	3:46
5.	"Brainville"	3:13
6.	"Guy Who Got a Headache and Accidentally Saves the World"	4:29
7.	"When You Smile"	3:13
8.	"Kim's Watermelon Gun"	3:21
9.	"They Punctured My Yolk"	4:21
10.	"Lightning Strikes the Postman"	2:50
11.	"Christmas at the Zoo"	3:06
12.	"Evil Will Prevail"	3:45
13.	"Bad Days" (Aurally Excited Version)	4:38

== Heady Nuggs: 20 Years After Clouds Taste Metallic ==
On December 18, 2015, Heady Nuggs: 20 Years After Clouds Taste Metallic: 1994-1997 was released, which contained a three-CD or five-LP compilation including the album, the 1994 odds-and-ends EP Due to High Expectations... The Flaming Lips Are Providing Needles for Your Balloons, a previously unreleased concert called Psychiatric Explorations Of The Fetus With Needles (Live In Seattle 1996), and a further rarities collection titled The King Bug Laughs. The CD only release also contains an original comic written and illustrated by Wayne Coyne. The vinyl reissue of Clouds Taste Metallic contains autographs signed by Wayne Coyne, and the deluxe edition contains a bundle of several out of print posters & T-shirts of the band that were originally available at concerts on their tour in 1995-1996 in support of Clouds Taste Metallic. Also included are digital downloads for songs such as the 1996 live versions of "Psychiatric Explorations of the Fetus With Needles" and "Put The Waterbug In The Policeman's Ear", studio versions of both said songs, and two additional studio recordings of "Hot Day", which was recorded for the soundtrack to the 1996 film subUrbia, and "Chosen One", which is a cover of Smog.

Side one
No.	Title	Length
1.	"The Abandoned Hospital Ship"	3:38
2.	"Psychiatric Explorations of the Fetus with Needles"	3:27
3.	"Placebo Headwound"	3:40
4.	"This Here Giraffe"	3:46
5.	"Brainville"	3:13
6.	"Guy Who Got a Headache and Accidentally Saves the World"	4:29

Side two
No.	Title	Length
7.	"When You Smile"	3:13
8.	"Kim's Watermelon Gun"	3:21
9.	"They Punctured My Yolk"	4:21
10.	"Lightning Strikes the Postman"	2:50
11.	"Christmas at the Zoo"	3:06
12.	"Evil Will Prevail"	3:45
13.	"Bad Days" (Aurally Excited Version)	4:38

Side three
No.	Title	Length
14.	"Bad Days"	4:35
15.	"Jets Part 2 (My Two Days as an Ambulance Driver)"	3:50
16.	"Ice Drummer"	4:25
17.	"Put the Waterbug in the Policeman's Ear"	5:20
18.	"Chewin' the Apple of Yer Eye"	5:26

Side four
No.	Title	Length
19.	"Chosen One" (Live)	7:28
20.	"Little Drummer Boy" (Live)	5:28
21.	"Slow Nerve Action" (Live)	7:33

Side five
No.	Title	Length
22.	"The Abandoned Hospital Ship" (Live)	7:25
23.	"Unconsciously Screamin'" (Live)	4:21
24.	"Take Meta Mars" (Live)	4:26

Side six
No.	Title	Length
25.	"Moth in the Incubator" (Live)	6:49
26.	"Put The Waterbug In The Policeman’s Ear" (Live)	6:04
27.	"Lightning Strikes the Postman" (Live)	3:28

Side seven
No.	Title	Length
28.	"Bad Days" (Live)	5:26
29.	"She Don't Use Jelly" (Live)	3:48
30.	"Chewin' the Apple of Your Eye" (Live)	6:42
31.	"When You Smile" (Live)	5:37

Side eight
No.	Title	Length
32.	"Psychiatric Explorations of the Fetus with Needles" (Live)	9:35
33.	"Love Yer Brain" (Live)	5:11
34.	"Placebo Headwound" (Live)	4:44

Side nine
No.	Title	Length
35.	"It Was a Very Good Year"	3:56
36.	"Sun Arise"	5:20
37.	"Life on Mars?"	4:04
38.	"Ballroom of Mars" (T. Rex cover)	4:29

Side ten
No.	Title	Length
39.	"Hot Day"	1:41
40.	"Nobody Told Me"	3:49
41.	"Magician vs. the Headache"	3:39
42.	"She Don't Use Jelly (Live at KJ103)"	3:33

== Personnel ==
- Wayne Coyne – vocals, guitar
- Steven Drozd – drums, piano, keyboards, guitar, vocals, glockenspiel
- Michael Ivins – bass, backing vocals
- Ronald Jones – guitar, vocals

== Alternate version ==
As part of Record Store Day 2016, the CD Lightning Strikes the Postman was released. This was an alternate mix of Clouds Taste Metallic prominently featuring ex-guitarist Ronald Jones.

== Cover versions ==
"They Punctured My Yolk" was sampled on the Beastie Boys' album To the 5 Boroughs in the song "We Got The." "Lightning Strikes the Postman" was covered by Scottish rock band Aereogramme on their album Seclusion.
