= In a Priest Driven Ambulance =

Studio album by the Flaming Lips
- Released: September 18, 1990
- Genres: Alternative rock; noise pop; psychedelic rock
- Length: 46:36 (original release); 55:43 (1995 re-release)
- Label: Restless Records/Enigma
- Producers: The Flaming Lips, Dave Fridmann

The Flaming Lips chronology
Telepathic Surgery (1989)	In a Priest Driven Ambulance (1990)	Hit to Death in the Future Head (1992)

Singles from In a Priest Driven Ambulance
- 1. "Unconsciously Screamin'" Released: March 1990

Professional ratings
Review scores
Source	Rating
AllMusic	4/5 stars
The Encyclopedia of Popular Music	3/5 stars
The Great Rock Discography	6/10
MusicHound Rock	4/5 stars
The Rolling Stone Album Guide	3.5/5 stars
Select	4/5
Sounds	4/5 stars

In a Priest Driven Ambulance (With Silver Sunshine Stares) is the fourth studio album by American rock band the Flaming Lips, released in 1990. It is the first Flaming Lips album to feature Jonathan Donahue (also of Mercury Rev) and drummer Nathan Roberts. This line-up would subsequently be signed by Warner Bros. Records and go on to record the follow-up album Hit to Death in the Future Head. It is a concept album primarily focused on frontman Wayne Coyne's fascination with religion.

A music video for the song "Unconsciously Screamin" was shot at a religious theme park called Holy Land USA in Waterbury, Connecticut, as well as Hampshire College in Amherst, Massachusetts and City Gardens in Trenton, New Jersey. It was directed by Jim Spring and Jens Jurgensen.

The album was re-released as a CD with two bonus tracks on January 17, 1995, although the full name with subtitle appears only on the vinyl release. It was also re-released in a two-CD special edition in 2002 under the title The Day They Shot a Hole in the Jesus Egg. The first disc of this release, composed of the entire Priest album and numerous bonus tracks, was also released as a limited-edition two-record vinyl release on pink vinyl.

"Unconsciously Screamin'" was released as an EP in 1991 to promote the album. Two of the B-sides were featured as bonus tracks on the 1995 re-release.

== Track listing ==
=== Original release ===
No.	Title	Length
1.	"Shine on Sweet Jesus"	4:27
2.	"Unconsciously Screamin'"	3:52
3.	"Rainin' Babies"	4:28
4.	"Take Meta Mars"	3:13
5.	"Five Stop Mother Superior Rain"	6:19
6.	"Stand in Line"	4:42
7.	"God Walks Among Us Now"	4:46
8.	"There You Are"	4:32
9.	"Mountain Side"	6:36
10.	"What a Wonderful World"	3:44

=== Limited edition vinyl-only reissue ===
In a Priest Driven Ambulance was reissued in 2005 on pink vinyl. The reissue is on four sides and contains the bonus tracks “Lucifer Rising”, “Ma, I Didn’t Notice”, “Let Me Be It”, “Drug Machine”, and “Strychnine/Peace, Love, and Understanding”. The cover has promotional photos and the inside sleeve has a story about the early Lips by Scott Booker.

Side One
No.	Title	Length
1.	"Shine on Sweet Jesus"	4:28
2.	"Unconsciously Screamin’"	3:53
3.	"Rainin’ Babies"	4:29
4.	"Take Meta Mars"	3:13
5.	"Five Stop Mother Superior Rain"	6:20

Side Two
No.	Title	Length
6.	"Stand in Line"	4:37
7.	"God Walks Among Us Now (Jesus Song No. 6)"	4:53
8.	"There You Are (Jesus Song No. 7)"	4:32
9.	"Mountain Side"	6:36
10.	"(What a) Wonderful World"	3:41

Side Three
No.	Title	Length
11.	"Lucifer Rising"	3:36
12.	"Ma, I Didn’t Notice"	8:11

Side Four
No.	Title	Length
13.	"Let Me Be It"	5:32
14.	"Drug Machine"	2:53
15.	"Strychnine/Peace, Love and Understanding"	3:59

- "Drug Machine" is the Sub Pop single rerecording of "Drug Machine in Heaven"; the song in its original form was featured on Telepathic Surgery.

== Influences ==
The song "Take Meta Mars" is closely modeled on the Can song "Mushroom" off the album Tago Mago.

== Personnel ==
- Wayne Coyne – vocals, guitar
- Michael Ivins – bass
- Jonathan Donahue – guitar
- Nathan Roberts – drums
- Dave Fridmann – recording engineer, producer
- Michele Vlasimsky – executive producer, photography
