= Oh My Gawd!!! =

Studio album by The Flaming Lips
- Released: June 1987
- Genres: Alternative rock; noise rock; neo-psychedelia
- Length: 48:00
- Label: Restless
- Producer: The Flaming Lips

The Flaming Lips chronology
Hear It Is (1986)	Oh My Gawd!!! (1987)	Telepathic Surgery (1989)

Professional ratings
Review scores
Source	Rating
AllMusic	3/5 stars
Encyclopedia of Popular Music	3/5 stars
The Great Rock Discography	7/10
MusicHound	3.5/5
Paste	6.9/10
The Rolling Stone Album Guide	3/5 stars

Oh My Gawd!!! (also known as Oh My Gawd!!!...The Flaming Lips) is the second studio album by the American rock band The Flaming Lips, released in June 1987 on Restless Records.

== Production ==
According to liner notes on a 1998 compilation, Wayne Coyne and Michael Ivins were experimenting with sleep deprivation while recording this album.

== Track listing ==
All tracks are written by The Flaming Lips.

No.	Title	Length
1.	"Everything's Explodin'"	4:44
2.	"One Million Billionth of a Millisecond on a Sunday Morning"	9:21
3.	"Maximum Dream for Evil Knievel"	2:50
4.	"Can't Exist"	2:48
5.	"Ode to C.C. (Part I)"	0:46
6.	"The Ceiling Is Bendin'"	3:45
7.	"Prescription: Love"	6:10
8.	"Thanks to You"	3:56
9.	"Can't Stop the Spring"	4:11
10.	"Ode to C.C. (Part II)"	1:50
11.	"Love Yer Brain"	7:44
Total length:		48:00

Notes

- The first track opens with the quote, "Take this, brother. May it serve you well," from the Beatles' "Revolution 9"
- The last track closes with a loop of the phrase "turn off your mind, relax..." sampled from the Beatles' "Tomorrow Never Knows"
- The track "Ode to C.C. (Part I)" references C.C. DeVille from the glam rock band Poison and contains a 30-second clip of "Talk Dirty to Me" when played backward on the vinyl version of the album.

== Retrospective reviews ==
Critics have noted the album's similarity to the music of Pink Floyd, particularly on the track "One Million Billionth of a Millisecond on a Sunday Morning." Zach Schonfeld, writing for Paste, described Oh My Gawd!!! as the Flaming Lips' "most eclectic early offering", albeit with "plenty of the band’s hooky hillbilly-punk in between." Brad Shoup wrote for Stereogum that "in time, the Flaming Lips would learn to incorporate their experiments into the songs, rather than cramming them in for the hell of it. But their glee at what they get away with here is infectious."

== Personnel ==
The Flaming Lips

- Wayne Coyne – lead vocals, guitar
- Michael Ivins – bass
- Richard English – drums, piano, backing vocals, lead vocals on "Can't Exist" and "Thanks to You"

Technical personnel

- Ruben Ayala – engineer
- The Flaming Lips – front cover painting
- Michele Vlasimsky – photography
