= Hear It Is =

1986 studio album by The Flaming Lips

Studio album by the Flaming Lips
- Released: July 1986
- Genre: Alternative rock; noise rock
- Length: 44:22
- Label: Restless; Rykodisc
- Producer: The Flaming Lips; Randy Burns

The Flaming Lips chronology
The Flaming Lips (1984)	Hear It Is (1986)	Oh My Gawd!!! (1987)

Professional ratings
Review scores
Source	Rating
AllMusic	2.5/5 stars
Encyclopedia of Popular Music	2/5 stars
The Great Rock Discography	5/10
MusicHound	3/5
Paste	6.9/10
The Rolling Stone Album Guide	2/5 stars

Hear It Is is the debut studio album by American rock band The Flaming Lips, released on July 1986, by Restless Records. It marked the official debut of Wayne Coyne on vocals after the departure of his brother Mark Coyne.

== Track listing ==
All tracks are written by the Flaming Lips, except where noted.

No.	Title	Length
1.	"With You"	3:39
2.	"Unplugged"	2:14
3.	"Trains, Brains & Rain"	3:39
4.	"Jesus Shootin' Heroin"	7:21
5.	"Just Like Before"	3:22
6.	"She Is Death"	4:04
7.	"Charlie Manson Blues"	4:22
8.	"Man from Pakistan"	3:59
9.	"Godzilla Flick"	4:05
10.	"Staring at Sound/With You (Reprise)"	5:08

Bonus tracks
No.	Title	Length
11.	"Summertime Blues" (On some editions)	2:30
12.	"Bag Full of Thoughts" (On "Pink Dust" edition)	5:38
13.	"Out for a Walk" (On "Pink Dust" edition)	3:20
14.	"Garden of Eyes/Forever Is a Long Time" (On "Pink Dust" edition)	5:27
15.	"Scratching the Door" (On "Pink Dust" edition)	7:09
16.	"My Own Planet" (On "Pink Dust" edition)	4:12

== Personnel ==
The Flaming Lips

- Wayne Coyne – lead vocals, guitars
- Mike Ivins – bass, backing vocals
- Richard English – drums, keyboards, backing vocals

Technical personnel

- Randy Burns – engineer
- The Flaming Lips – design
- Michele Vlasimsky – photography
