= The Soft Bulletin =

Studio album by the Flaming Lips
- Released: May 17, 1999
- Recorded: April 1997 – February 1999
- Studios: Tarbox Road Studios, Cassadaga, New York
- Genres: Neo-psychedelia; psychedelic rock; symphonic pop; symphonic rock; art rock; alternative rock; dream pop
- Length: 58:26
- Label: Warner Bros.
- Producers: The Flaming Lips; Dave Fridmann; Scott Booker

The Flaming Lips chronology
Zaireeka (1997)	The Soft Bulletin (1999)	Yoshimi Battles the Pink Robots (2002)

Singles from The Soft Bulletin
- 1. "Race for the Prize" Released: June 14, 1999; 2. "Waitin' for a Superman" Released: November 8, 1999

The Soft Bulletin is the ninth studio album by American rock band the Flaming Lips, released by Warner Bros. Records on May 17, 1999, in the United Kingdom, and on June 22, 1999, in the United States. The album was released to widespread acclaim, and was hailed by critics as a departure from their previous guitar-heavy alternative rock sound into a more layered, intricately arranged work.

== Music and lyrics ==
The album was considered to mark a change in the course for the band, with more traditional catchy melodies, accessible-sounding music (their previous album Zaireeka was a quadruple album of experimental sounds meant to be played on four separate stereo systems simultaneously), and more serious and thoughtful lyrics.

The album was also noted for its fusion of ordinary rock instruments, electronic beats, and synthesizers. Its large, layered, symphonic sound has also earned it a reputation as the Pet Sounds of the 1990s from a few critics. This sound was achieved in part by detuning and layering multiple MIDI keyboards as opposed to recording a live orchestra.

== Artwork ==
The cover artwork of the album is a modified version of a photograph taken by Lawrence Schiller titled The Acid Test: Neal Cassady, which according to Schiller, depicts Neal Cassady dancing with his own shadow during an Acid Test conducted by the Merry Pranksters. The original photograph was featured in a 1966 Life magazine article on LSD.

== Reception ==
Professional ratings
Aggregate scores
Source	Rating
Metacritic	85/100
Review scores
Source	Rating
AllMusic	5/5 stars
Entertainment Weekly	A
The Guardian	4/5 stars
Melody Maker	4/5 stars
NME	9/10
Pitchfork	10/10
Rolling Stone	3/5 stars
The Rolling Stone Album Guide	5/5 stars
Spin	9/10
The Village Voice	B

The Soft Bulletin was lauded by critics and fans alike and topped numerous "Best of 1999" lists. The album is now considered by many to be the Flaming Lips's masterpiece. The Soft Bulletin is considered by some to be partially responsible for establishing the latter-day identity of the Flaming Lips, and as its following expanded over the years after its release, paving the way to their being among the most well-respected groups of the 2000s.

In 2006, Robert Dimery chose The Soft Bulletin and its follow-up Yoshimi Battles the Pink Robots as part of his book 1001 Albums You Must Hear Before You Die. Pitchfork ranked the album 3rd on the Top 100 albums of the 1990s list, and awarded it a rare score of 10.0. AllMusic's Jason Ankeny gave it a highly enthusiastic review, concluding that "there's no telling where The Lips will go from here, but it's almost beside the point – not just the best album of 1999, The Soft Bulletin might be the best record of the entire decade".

Since late 2010, the album has been sporadically performed live in its entirety over the years, and on May 26, 2016, an orchestra was used to embellish sounds of the album while the band played their main instruments for the album at the concert.

As of 2002 it had sold 100,000 units in the United States according to Nielsen SoundScan. In 2006, the album earned certified Gold status in United Kingdom (BPI).

== Track listing ==
Upon its release, The Soft Bulletin was subject to record company demands for commercial-sounding music, hence the inclusion of remixes of several songs. In addition, the US ("The Spiderbite Song") and UK ("Slow Motion") CDs each contain one track that the other does not.

=== US CD release ===
All tracks are written by The Flaming Lips.

No.	Title	Length
1.	"Race for the Prize" (Mokran remix)	4:09
2.	"A Spoonful Weighs a Ton"	3:32
3.	"The Spark That Bled"	5:55
4.	"The Spiderbite Song"	4:02
5.	"Buggin'" (Mokran remix)	3:16
6.	"What Is the Light?"	4:05
7.	"The Observer"	4:11
8.	"Waitin' for a Superman"	4:17
9.	"Suddenly Everything Has Changed"	3:54
10.	"The Gash"	4:02
11.	"Feeling Yourself Disintegrate"	5:17
12.	"Sleeping on the Roof"	3:09
13.	"Race for the Prize"	4:18
14.	"Waitin' for a Superman" (Mokran remix)	4:19
Total length:		58:26

The worldwide digital edition uses the US track listing but switches the versions of "Race for the Prize" (track 1 and 13).

=== UK and Australian CD release ===
No.	Title	Length
1.	"Race for the Prize"	4:18
2.	"A Spoonful Weighs a Ton"	3:32
3.	"The Spark That Bled"	5:55
4.	"Slow Motion"	3:53
5.	"What Is the Light?"	4:05
6.	"The Observer"	4:10
7.	"Waitin' for a Superman"	4:17
8.	"Suddenly Everything Has Changed"	3:54
9.	"The Gash"	4:02
10.	"Feeling Yourself Disintegrate"	5:17
11.	"Sleeping on the Roof"	3:09
12.	"Race for the Prize" (Mokran remix)	4:09
13.	"Waitin' for a Superman" (Mokran remix)	4:19
14.	"Buggin'" (Mokran remix)	3:16

=== Vinyl release ===
Side one
No.	Title	Length
1.	"Race for the Prize"
2.	"A Spoonful Weighs a Ton"
3.	"The Spark That Bled"
4.	"The Spiderbite Song"

Side two
No.	Title	Length
1.	"Buggin'"
2.	"What Is the Light?"
3.	"The Observer"

Side three
No.	Title	Length
1.	"Waitin' for a Superman"
2.	"Suddenly Everything Has Changed"
3.	"The Gash"

Side four
No.	Title	Length
1.	"Slow Motion"
2.	"Feeling Yourself Disintegrate"
3.	"Sleeping on the Roof"

== The Soft Bulletin Companion ==
The Soft Bulletin Companion was a promotional release containing outtakes recordings and alternate mixes produced during the sessions for The Soft Bulletin. It is notable for being one of the few releases to feature single-disc mixes of songs from their previous album Zaireeka. It was originally distributed as a promotional CD-R in 1999, and was later released commercially as a limited edition vinyl LP for Record Store Day in June 2021, before a wider CD and digital release in July 2021.

All tracks written by Wayne Coyne, Steven Drozd and Michael Ivins, except when noted.

No.	Title	Writer(s)	Length
1.	"Thirty-Five Thousand Feet Of Despair"		5:05
2.	"1000 Ft. Hands" (Early Mix)		3:17
3.	"Riding To Work In The Year 2025 (Your Invisible Now)"		5:52
4.	"Buggin'" (Lips Mix)		3:24
5.	"A Machine In India" (Edit)		4:08
6.	"Okay I'll Admit That I Really Don't Understand"		4:33
7.	"The Captain"		5:14
8.	"Satellite Of You"		4:29
9.	"The Spiderbite Song" (Early Mix)		3:55
10.	"Slow Motion" (Early Mix)		3:19
11.	"1000 Ft. Hands" (Final Mix)		5:50
12.	"Little Hands" (Rough Mix)	Alexander Spence	4:39
13.	"The Big Ol' Bug Is The New Baby Now"		4:59

== The Soft Bulletin 5.1 ==
On January 31, 2006, Warner Bros. re-released The Soft Bulletin in the US as a two-disc package titled The Soft Bulletin 5.1. It includes a remastered CD and a DVD-Audio disc that contains a 5.1-channel surround sound mix of the album.

=== Package content ===
==== CD and DVD ====
1. "Race for the Prize" – 4:18
2. "A Spoonful Weighs a Ton" – 3:32
3. "The Spark That Bled" – 5:55
4. "Slow Motion" – 3:49
5. "What Is the Light?" – 4:05
6. "The Observer" – 4:11
7. "Waitin' for a Superman" – 4:17
8. "Suddenly Everything Has Changed" – 3:54
9. "The Gash" – 4:02
10. "Feeling Yourself Disintegrate" – 5:23
11. "Sleeping on the Roof" – 3:04
12. "The Spiderbite Song" – 4:02
13. "Buggin'" – 3:22

==== DVD videos ====
1. "Race for the Prize" – 4:26
2. "Waitin' for a Superman" – 4:39

==== DVD outtakes ====
1. "1000 Ft. Hands" – 5:50
2. "The Captain Is a Cold Hearted and Egotistical Fool" – 5:14
3. "Satellite of You" – 4:32

==== DVD radio sessions ====
1. "Up Above the Daily Hum" – 4:38
2. "The Switch That Turns Off the Universe" – 7:54
3. "We Can't Predict the Future" – 3:04
4. "It Remained Unrealizable" – 8:34
- The 5.1 package has the UK track list with the remixes at the end removed. They were replaced with "The Spiderbite Song" and the original mix of "Buggin'" which had previously only seen release on a US promotional CD.
- This package marks the first time that US consumers have been able to get "Slow Motion" on CD, as this had previously only been available on the UK CD and the US vinyl releases.

=== Packaging error ===
The first pressings of The Soft Bulletin 5.1 were erroneously shipped with an original US CD instead of the new remastered CD with the revised track list. The band offered to replace the incorrect CD with the new version for anyone who received the wrong CD in their package. In addition, many people who sent their incorrect CDs in for replacement also received a handwritten letter of apology from the band's bassist, Michael Ivins. Warner Bros. has since fixed this problem.

== Personnel ==
The Flaming Lips

- Wayne Coyne – vocals, guitar, keyboards, theremin
- Michael Ivins – bass, keyboards, backing vocals, engineering
- Steven Drozd – drums, percussion, guitar, keyboards, bass, backing vocals

Production

- The Flaming Lips – production, mix, recording
- Dave Fridmann – production, mix, recording
- Michael Ivins – additional engineering
- Scott Booker – production
- Steve Hall – mastering (at Future Disc Systems)

Remixes

- Peter Mokran – additional production & mix
- Scott Bennett – additional bass on "Waitin' for a Superman (Remix)"

Packaging

- Lawrence Schiller – cover photograph
- George Salisbury – layout & design

== Charts ==
Weekly chart performance for The Soft Bulletin
Chart (2024)	Peak position
Hungarian Physical Albums (MAHASZ)	32
Scottish Albums (Official Charts)	51
UK Albums (Official Charts)	39
