= Michael Ivins =

American musician (born 1963)

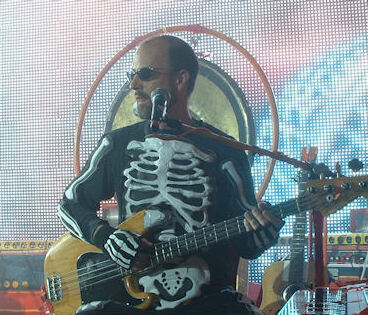

Background information
- Born: Michael Lee Ivins; March 17, 1963 (age 63)
- Origin: Omaha, Nebraska, U.S.
- Genres: Neo-psychedelia; alternative rock
- Occupation: Musician
- Instruments: Bass; keyboards; vocals
- Years active: 1983–present
- Label: Warner Bros.
- Formerly of: The Flaming Lips

Michael Lee Ivins (born March 17, 1963) is the former bassist, keyboardist, backing vocalist and founding member of The Flaming Lips.

Along with Mark Coyne and Wayne Coyne, he formed The Flaming Lips in 1983 in Oklahoma City, Oklahoma. According to frontman Coyne, Ivins was found as the bassist for the band because of his punk-rock look, and not because of his musical ability. In fact, Ivins initially could not play bass, but he learned how and was bassist for the band for 38 years, until 2021. Ivins developed an interest in the recording process and helped engineer the Flaming Lips' studio recordings starting in 1994, ending with 2020's American Head. Ivins has also been credited with working with artists such as Mastodon, Ben Folds Five, The Bad Plus, The Postal Service and The Holy Fire.

Ivins would often wear dark sunglasses to live performances, as well as a full-body skeleton suit in tribute to John Entwistle who wore a similar suit during the Who’s 1970 tour. He also wore a skeleton suit when the Flaming Lips covered the Who’s Tommy medley at the 2008 VH1 Rock Honors. Ivins would also commonly wear T-shirts with hammer and sickle designs. During the announcement of "Do You Realize??" as the official rock song of Oklahoma in 2009, Rep. Corey Holland, R-Marlow said he had been "really offended" when Ivins came to the official ceremony wearing a hammer and sickle shirt. Ivins later reflected on the controversy, saying “I don’t think it was the actual intention to cause an actual uproar. […] I suppose it could have been any shirt but then what’s the fun in that?”.

On August 20, 2021, Wayne Coyne confirmed in a post on Instagram that Ivins was no longer in the band. In a 2022 interview, Coyne explained why Jake Ingalls and Ivins left, stating Ivins was burnt out from his work with the Flaming Lips.

During the second half of 2022, Ivins began to appear in Instagram clips advertising a new group he is in with guitarist/vocalist Julia Kean called The Lolly Bombs. Since 2023, Ivins and Kean have been releasing music on their Bandcamp page, and are currently working on a full-length studio album.

Ivins and Flaming Lips manager Scott Booker both had a guest appearance in the episode "Demons" of Star Trek: Enterprise.
