= List of Blue's Clues characters =

The characters (minus Magenta, Periwinkle, and Rainbow Puppy, Mailbox) as they appear in Blue's Clues & You!.

Blue's Clues is an American children's television series airing on the Nickelodeon family of channels. The series takes place inside a world in which everything is made of paper cutouts, clay, and other craft materials. It is presented by a live-action human host who lives in a yellow house inhabited by anthropomorphic everyday objects.

Steve Burns hosted the series from its debut in 1996 until 2002, when the part was taken over by Donovan Patton. The program features an ensemble cast of animated characters who interact with the host. Co-creator Traci Paige Johnson voices the title character, an animated, blue-spotted dog named Blue who communicates through distinctive barks. The series composers Michael Rubin and Nick Balaban voiced Mailbox and Mr. Salt, respectively.

In addition to the main characters, the show included various newly introduced recurring characters and guest stars throughout its run. Some guests appeared as live-action companions of the host, while others voiced an animated cameo role. When a spin-off series titled Blue's Room premiered in 2004, a group of puppet characters was introduced as new friends of Blue. A reboot titled Blue's Clues & You! premiered in 2019, with Josh Dela Cruz as the new host.

== Characters ==
=== Main ===
- Blue (vocal effects by Traci Paige Johnson in Blue's Clues and Blue’s Clues & You!, voiced by Victoria Pontecorvo and puppeteered by Leslie Carrara-Rudolph in Season 1 and Noel MacNeal in Season 2 of Blue's Room) is a playful and friendly female dog with light blue fur and dark blue spots. She cannot talk but communicates with her owners, Steve, Joe and Josh, through barks that they interpret. In each episode, she plays a game called Blue's Clues, in which she leaves three blue paw print clues for the host and viewers to find in order to answer a question. She has the ability to enter storybooks and picture frames by "skidooing" into them with a special dance routine. In the sixth season, she is granted a magic playroom called Blue's Room in which she can interact with the viewer and a cast of live-action puppet characters. In most animated appearances, she is one of the series' creators. Johnson was cast as the character's voice because out of the crew, she was able to sound the most like a dog.
- Steve (played by Steve Burns) is the host of the show's first four seasons, Joe's older brother, Josh, Linda, and Paulo's cousin. Steve's Grandma's older grandson, and Lola's grandnephew, known for wearing his green horizontal striped shirt, and khaki pants. He is Blue's first owner and caregiver. He is intelligent, cheerful, friendly, helpful and sympathetic, but sometimes clumsy, impulsive and forgetful. He is always excited and prepared to play Blue's Clues, but can almost never find clues himself and relies on the viewer to help locate them. Whenever he finds a clue, he draws it on a pocket-sized pad of paper called the Handy Dandy Notebook. When he finishes a game of Blue's Clues, he sits in a giant red armchair called the Thinking Chair and comes up with possible solutions to Blue's puzzles. Within the first two seasons, he would give out wrong and silly answers during thinking time, much to Blue's dismay. His favorite time of the day is mail time when he receives a letter from Mailbox. At the end of the fourth season, Steve becomes the mentor to his younger brother, Joe, because he teaches him to play "Blue's Clues" in the episode "Joe Gets a Clue". After that, Steve leaves for college on a hopscotch scholarship and leaves Joe to take care of his house and Blue. There, he becomes the varsity captain for the hopscotch team at his college as revealed in the 100th episode special. Years after the original series, a background civilian for the 2009 animated film Up was allegedly created after himself, this time in CGI animation, seen watching Carl's house being lifted by balloons, taking flight from town towards the beginning of the film. In the reboot series Blue's Clues & You!, Steve has since graduated from college and now runs the Blueprints Detective Agency (BDA) and appears as a recurring character. He is the one that most countries dubbed or replaced (there are three countries known for Steve's replacement, first in the UK, where British TV personality Kevin Duala got the role, second in Portugal, third in Korea).
- Joe (played by Donovan Patton) is the host of the show's final two seasons. He is Steve's younger brother who stays at the Blue's Clues house after Steve leaves for college, and is known for wearing different color shirts with a horizontal stripe full of squares, including Red, Orange, Yellow, Green, Blue, and Purple. His favorite toy is a stuffed duck named Boris. He owns a Handy Dandy Notebook similar to Steve's, but it is larger and shaped like the Thinking Chair. In later episodes of the final two seasons, Joe normally does not draw clues in his notebook and instead watches magically animated versions of the clues appear. Although sometimes silly and younger than Steve, he seems to be more mature and straight-talking as he never gave out wrong answers during thinking time thanks to Steve advising him not to give out wrong answers. In the reboot series Blue's Clues & You!, Joe now runs the Present Store and appears as a recurring character.
- Josh (played by Josh Dela Cruz) is the host of the revival series Blue's Clues & You! and the third and final host of the franchise. He is Steve and Joe's younger Filipino-American cousin and a talented singer. Josh's double-sided Handy Dandy Notebook has a phone on the other side, which he uses to communicate with the other characters. Josh's favorite color is blue, and he plays an acoustic guitar in nearly every episode, his guitar has red swirls on it similar to those on the thinking chair. Josh is easily excited and, like Steve, occasionally gives out wrong answers to Blue's Clues before coming up with the correct answer much to Blue's amusement.
- Mailbox (voiced by Michael Rubin, who is normally credited under the stage name Seth O'Hickory in the original series and Doug Murray in the reboot series) is a cheerful and purple mailbox who lives at the foot of the pathway in front of the Blue's Clues house. In each episode, Mailbox delivers a letter or informs an incoming e-mail after the host sings a special, Western-style song called "Mailtime" ("Post Time" in the UK) and sits on the Thinking Chair. His letters contain video messages from children around the world that relate to the episode's topic. Originally, Mailbox has a thick Brooklyn accent but now he doesn't have it; he likes to crack jokes, he wants to be a comedian when he grows up and he also has a collection of postage stamps. Although he is normally stationed on a stake in the ground, he can use an "extendo" arm to move anywhere around the house or the backyard. In the UK, he was called "Postbox" and had a British accent.
- Sidetable Drawer, usually called Sidetable for short, (voiced by Aleisha Allen in the original series and Liyou Abere in the reboot series from 2019 to 2020, Shazdeh Kapadia from 2020 to 2024 and Skywalker Hughes in 2024) is red with an orange drawer, and the keeper of the Handy Dandy Notebook. She lives in the living room to the left of the Thinking Chair. Whenever Steve or Joe starts a game of Blue's Clues, they must go to Sidetable and ask her for their notebook. She usually has Steve's telephone on top of her and holds an assortment of useful items in her drawer, depending on the situation. She is a talented singer and enjoys performing on stage. However, she is shy and sometimes lets her lack of confidence prevent her from singing in front of others. She has been known to be sad whenever someone doesn't say "please", as proven in the episode "Blue's Sad Day". Sidetable likes all kinds of music. Unlike the other characters, Sidetable has an inanimate form without a face that is seen whenever she is not speaking. In the reboot series, her tabletop is square and gains a wooden texture.
- The Spice Family, also known as the Shakers, are a group of condiment dispensers who live in the kitchen, each named after the type of spice they contain.
  - Mr. Salt (voiced by Nick Balaban in the original series & Blue's Big City Adventure and Brad Adamson in the reboot series from seasons one to four, and Nick Balaban in season five) is white of French heritage, Grandma Cayenne's son-in-law, Grandpa Thyme's son, Aunt Nutmeg's brother-in-law, and Paprika, Cinnamon, Sage, and Ginger's father and acts as the homemaker of the Blue's Clues house. He takes care of the other residents and prepares food for them. He and his wife Mrs. Pepper come from Paris, where they worked as cooks. Despite his experience as a chef, Mr. Salt is prone to accidents in the kitchen and often needs the host's help when he is baking.
  - Mrs. Pepper (voiced by Penelope Jewkes during the first season and by Spencer Kayden for the remainder of the original series and by Gisele Rousseau in the reboot series) is gray, and the mother figure of the Blue's Clues house, Grandma Cayenne's daughter, Grandpa Thyme's daughter-in-law, Aunt Nutmeg's sister, and Paprika, Cinnamon, Sage, and Ginger's mother. She spends much of her time caring for Paprika and Cinnamon. In her free time, she likes to sing with Mr. Salt and swim in the kitchen sink. She is commonly shown holding Cinnamon in her arms while Mr. Salt holds Paprika.
  - Paprika (voiced by Jenna Marie Castle as a baby and by Corrine Hoffman as a toddler in the original series and by Shechinah Mpumlwana in the reboot series from 2019 to 2020 and by Abigail Nicholson from 2020 to 2023 and Abigail Oliver in 2024) is reddish-brown, and Mr. Salt and Mrs. Pepper's daughter. In the first three seasons, she is a baby and only speaks in incomplete sentences. She has an orange gummy teddy bear and sleeps in a crib made from a peanut. In the fourth season, Paprika becomes a toddler and prepares to be a responsible sibling after the announcement of Mrs. Pepper's second child. In the reboot series, she gets older and is now a preteen.
  - Cinnamon (voiced by Nick Balaban's daughter, Annalivia Balaban in the original series, Jaiden Cannatelli in the reboot series from 2019 to 2020, Niko Ceci from 2020 to 2024 and Jayd Reroché in 2024) is Mr. Salt and Mrs. Pepper's son, who is introduced over a five-episode story arc during the fourth season. He has several hand-me-down playthings from Paprika and a purple rattle, which is his favorite toy. When Paprika helps teach him how to do things, she learns more about herself and her role as his older sister. In the reboot series, he gets older and has a clearer and deeper voice.
  - Sage and Ginger are Mr. Salt and Mrs. Pepper's 1 year old fraternal twins, who only appear in Blue's Clues & You!. They are both short bottles with faces, arms, and cork caps. Sage is a boy whose bottle is colored green, and Ginger is a girl whose bottle is colored light brown.
- Shovel (voiced by Stephen Schmidt from 1996 to 2001, by Jonathan Press from 2001 to 2003, by Thomas Sharkey in the original series, and by Leo Orgil in the reboot series from 2019 to 2022, and by Nathan Sayavong in season four and Luke Dietz in season five) and Pail (voiced by Marshall Claffy from 1996 to 2001, by Julia Wetherell from 2001 to 2003, and by Nicole Gibson in 2004 in the original series and by Jordana Blake in the reboot series from 2019 to 2022 and by Michela Luci from 2023 to 2024) are a 6-year-old brother and sister, respectively, who live in the garden of the Blue's Clues house. They accompany Steve or Joe whenever a game of Blue's Clues leads them outside to the backyard. Their favorite activity is building sand castles together on the sand table. They love learning about the different types of animals that live outside. They both dream of becoming veterinarians when they grow up. Their color schemes parallel each other's; Shovel is yellow with a red mouth, while Pail is red with a yellow mouth. In the UK, these eponymously named anthropomorphic kids' construction toys are called "Spade" and "Bucket".
- Tickety Tock, usually called Tickety for short, (voiced by Kathryn Avery from 1996 to 2001 and by Kelly Nigh from 2001 to 2004 in the original series and by Ava Augustin in the reboot series from seasons one to four and Maja Vujicic in season five), is a pink alarm clock and Grandfather Clock's granddaughter who lives on a nightstand in the bedroom of the Blue's Clues house. The '12' mark on her face is usually replaced by a symbol that relates to the episode's topic. She loves counting different things and often invites the host and the viewers to help her with basic math. Tickety is very number-oriented and likes to keep schedules. She is responsible for waking the residents of the Blue's Clues house every morning by ringing her bells. She is best friends with Slippery.
- Slippery Soap, usually called Slippery for short, (voiced by Cody Ross Pitts from 1996 to 2001, Patrick Van Wagenen from 2001 to 2003, and Sean Hanley in 2004 in the original series and Jacob Soley in the reboot series from seasons one to four and Lexi Perri in season five), is a lavender-colored bar of soap is Slick's cousin who lives in the bathroom of the Blue's Clues house. He often has trouble standing upright and is known for shouting "Whoa!" whenever he slides around. He is always surrounded by a trail of bubbles. He dreams of becoming the captain of a boat when he grows up and likes to wear a blue sailor cap with an anchor emblem on it. He is best friends with Tickety. He is always surrounded at the bottom by a trail of translucent bubbles of various colors. In the original series, Slippery, Shovel, and Pail were the only main non-human characters with permanent eyebrows.
- Magenta (voiced by Koyalee Chanda in the original series and Diane Salema in the reboot series) is Blue's best friend, who is identical to Blue with the exception of a magenta fur coat and glasses. She is one of Blue's classmates at school and has visited the Blue's Clues house on special occasions. Magenta is shyer than Blue but shares the same playful and fun attitude.
- Periwinkle, or simply Peri for short, (voiced by Cameron Bowen from 2000 to 2001, by Kenny Kim from 2001 to 2003, and by Jansen Panettiere in 2004, and Luxton Handspiker from 2021 to 2022 in the reboot series and by Peter Laurie from 2023 to 2024), is a male white kitten with dark blue stripes from the city and Mauve's grandson. His hobbies include performing magic tricks, putting on shows, and building forts. He is very outgoing and can speak, unlike most animal characters. He is in a long-distance friendship with a purple bird from the city named Plum. He is a bilingual speaker.
- Rainbow Puppy (voiced by Brianna Bryan) is a bipedal rainbow-colored dog who appears as Blue's new neighbor in Blue's Clues & You!, She is a charismatic, confident puppy from the city who loves to sing and dance. Making her debut in the reboot's third season premiere, Our New Neighbor!, she replaces Periwinkle's bilingual bird friend, Plum. Unlike other puppies and just like Blue in Blue's Room, she can walk and talk like a human. She also appeared in Blue's Big City Adventure.
- Sprinkles (voiced by Joey Mazzarino) is Blue's baby brother and the co-host of the show added to the cast in the second season. Originally a plain white puppy, Sprinkles developed spots upon learning a few things. Sprinkles was created by two sisters, Ashleigh and Lacey Campion through a Nick Jr. competition.

=== Supporting ===
- Snail (voiced by Nick Balaban) is a pink garden snail who appears hidden in three scenes of every episode. His appearances are intended as Easter eggs for viewers to look for. The snail is rarely addressed directly or acknowledged by the main characters. He makes a guest appearance during the final musical number in Blue's Big Musical Movie, in which he sings while riding a skateboard and reveals himself to have a loud, deep voice. In the spin-off series Blue's Room, the snail appears as a stuffed animal in the background.
- The Felt Friends are a group of children made entirely of geometric felt shapes. They live in a world that Blue and the host can enter by "skidooing" into a picture frame in the Blue's Clues house. They often ask for the host's help when they need to count, build, or fix something constructed with felt shapes. Many of the Felt Friends' names start with the letter F.
- Turquoise is Blue's pet turtle, who has a light blue shell with dark blue pentagonal shapes on it. Steve gives her to Blue as a special birthday present. Turquoise appears sporadically in episodes afterwards, normally in a small glass terrarium on the bedroom shelf.
- Baby Bear is a young female bear cub from the storybook "Goldilocks and the Three Bears". After Blue and Steve visit her story in "Blue's Story Time", she becomes a recurring friend of Blue and visits the main characters on special occasions. She lives with her parents Papa Bear and Mama Bear. Her catchphrase is "I'm not tired!"
- Gingerbread Boy is a talking gingerbread cookie who lives in a board game similar to Candy Land. Blue and Steve occasionally "skidoo" into his game to visit him. He has a sister, Gingerbread Girl.
- Green Puppy, or Green for short, (voiced by Adam Peltzman), is one of Blue's schoolmates, a mint green bulldog who communicates through gruff barks. Unlike the other dogs featured in the series, Green Puppy is depicted with visible teeth incisors and has short ears. Green Puppy is playful, but she can be a bit rough.
- Orange Kitten, or Orange for short, (voiced by Caitlin Hale in the original series and Glee Dango in the reboot series), is a kitten who attends Blue's preschool class.
- Purple Kangaroo, or Purple for short, (voiced by Alexander Claffy in the original series and Justice James in the reboot series from seasons one to four and Ivano DiCaro in season five), is a soft-spoken lavender-colored kangaroo who also attends Blue's preschool class.

=== Minor ===
- Miranda (played by Shannon Walker Williams in the original series and Adriana Vasquez in the reboot series) is Magenta's owner and Steve and Josh's friend.
- Marlee (played by herself) is a librarian who is featured in the Steve and Marlee promos. She appears to be deaf and silent, but can read people's lips and communicates through sign language.
- Miss Marigold (voiced by Aisha Hinds in the original series and Rachel Bloom in the reboot series) is the teacher of Blue's preschool class who appears in three episodes. Unlike most other humans on the show, she is not portrayed by a live-action actor but is animated. In the reboot series, she is a pink, anthropomorphic hippopotamus with a flower on her head.
- Steve and Joe's Grandma (played by Rue McClanahan) is the grandmother of Steve and Joe, who wears a green striped dress similar to Steve's shirt. She lives next door to the Blue's Clues house and is occasionally mentioned by Steve.
- Wynonna (played by herself) is Green Puppy's owner and Steve's friend. She and Green Puppy celebrate Christmas.
- Tyrese (played by himself) is Purple Kangaroo's owner and Steve's friend. He and Purple Kangaroo celebrate Kwanzaa.
- Sam (played by Lisa Datz) is Orange Kitten's owner and Steve's friend. She and Orange Kitten celebrate Hanukkah.
- Sifter is a close friend of Shovel and Pail. His favorite hobby is playing basketball.
- Plum (voiced by Nicolas Salgado, who is sometimes credited as Nicolas Marti Salgado) is a small purple bird and an old friend of Periwinkle's from the city. He's also bilingual, speaking both Spanish and English. He did not appear in the reboot as he got replaced by Rainbow Puppy
- Lola (played by Carolyn Fe) is Josh's grandmother from the Philippines. She has the answer to Blue's Clues and in the Mailtime segment of "Sleepy Singalong with Blue". She has also appeared in some digital content released on the Blue's Clues & You! YouTube channel singing songs with Josh in English and Tagalog.
- Aly (played by Izzi Nagel) is Periwinkle's owner; she never appeared or was mentioned in the original series until her only appearance in "A Blue's Clues Festival of Lights" in the reboot series.
- Mauve (voiced by Rex Hagon) is a pink adult cat and Periwinkle's grandfather. He and his grandson, Periwinkle, celebrate Hanukkah with Josh, Blue, and their friends. Due to his Jewish heritage, he wears a traditional blue Kippah on the back of his head.
- Pearl (voice by Sadie Trant) is a clever and cheerful bunny who has albinism and nystagmus.
