= Donovan Patton =

American actor (born 1978)

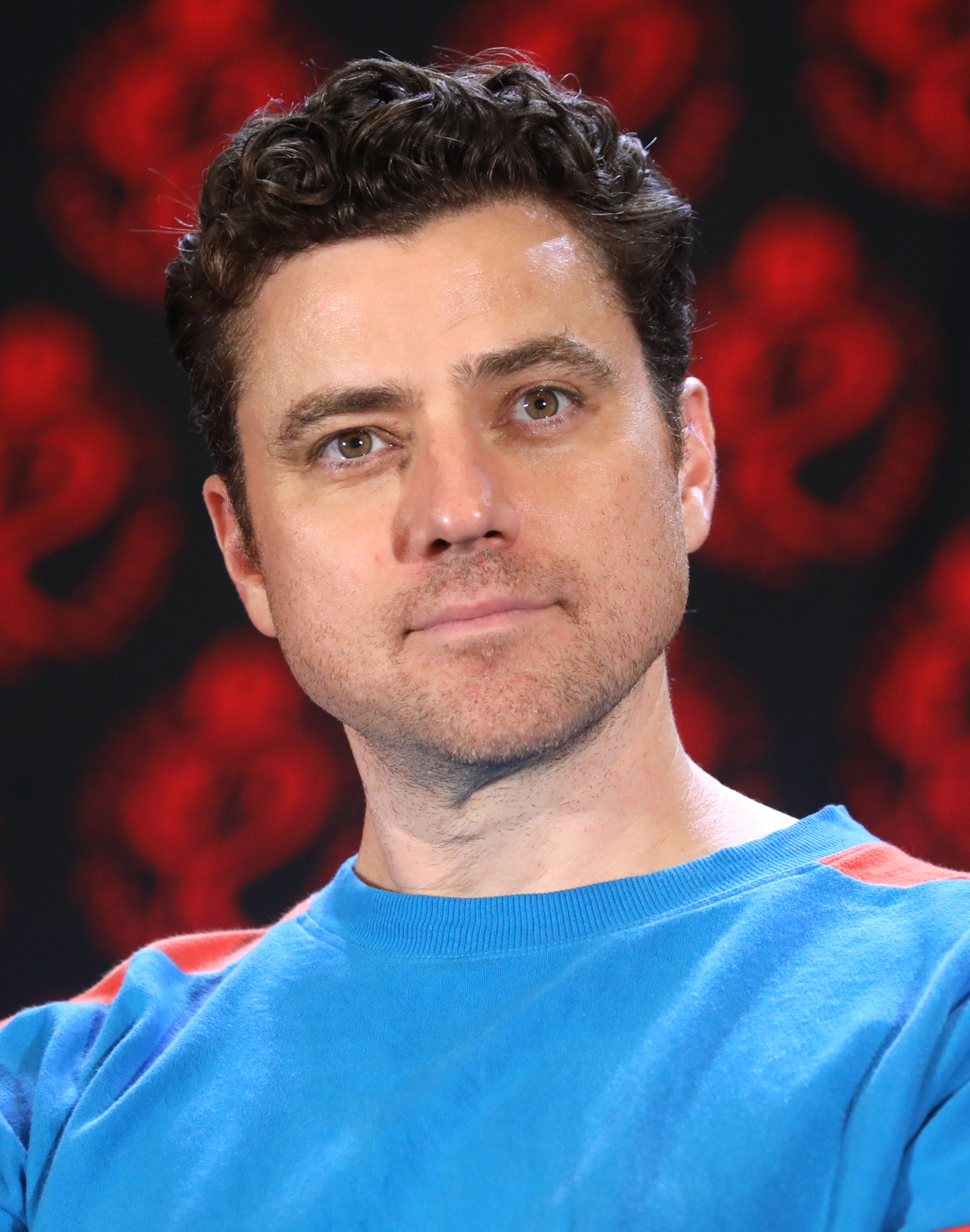
- Patton in 2024
- Born: March 1, 1978 (age 48); Naval Air Station Agana, Guam, U.S.
- Occupations: Actor; television host
- Years active: 1996–present
- Spouse: Jackie Patton
- Children: 2

Donovan Patton (born March 1, 1978) is an American actor and television host. Patton graduated from the Interlochen Arts Academy and acted in Shakespeare plays such as Much Ado About Nothing and Romeo and Juliet before replacing Steve Burns as the host of the television program Blue's Clues in 2002. Series co-creator Angela Santomero stated that Patton brought Joe, his character, closer to the preschool viewer, as Joe was more willing to "jump into a problem rather than figuring it out first like Steve". He also reprised his role as Joe in the spin-off Blue's Room (2004–2007) and the reboot Blue's Clues & You! (2019–2024). Since 2006, Patton also voices Bot on Nickelodeon's Team Umizoomi, and CatRat on the Netflix original DreamWorks series Gabby's Dollhouse.

Although most of his career has been in children's television programs, Patton has also appeared in independent films, such as Black Wine (2005), Awake (2013), Lies I Told My Little Sister (2014), The Broken Ones (2017), The Murder (2019), The Anniversary (2019), Psycho Escort (2020), and DieRy (2020), and in television shows, such as Blue Bloods (2011), Nurse Jackie (2011), and Damages (2012).

He also appeared in video games, such as Grand Theft Auto V (2013), Lego Jurassic World (2015), Star Wars: The Old Republic – Knights of the Fallen Empire (2015), Halo 5: Guardians (2015), Horizon: Zero Dawn (2017), Minecraft: Story Mode (2017), and God of War (2018).

== Early life and education ==
Patton was born on a U.S. military base in Guam to Michael Patton (1951–2014), an Air Force meteorologist, and Darlene Curtis (born 1952), who worked for the Leukemia and Lymphoma Society. He has an older brother, Casey, and a younger half-sister, Annabelle. After his parents divorced when he was 3, he, his brother, and their mother moved to Colorado. They moved to Las Vegas when Donovan was 12. Patton graduated from the Interlochen Arts Academy in northwest Michigan in 1996, having transferred there his junior year.

== Career ==
His first acting roles were in Shakespeare plays such as Much Ado About Nothing and Romeo and Juliet. He took acting classes in Manhattan while working odd jobs such as a book clerk and a video deliveryman.

=== Blue's Clues ===
Patton's "big break" came in the autumn of 2000 when he was cast to replace Steve Burns as Joe, the second host of the Nickelodeon children's television program Blue's Clues. At the time, Patton worked as a waiter and a part-time actor in Williamsburg, Brooklyn, New York. He was originally set up for a part in Blair Witch Project 2 at the time, but he considered the role as Joe "a happy accident". Patton became a "household name" and has been called "an unqualified star to the 5-and-under set and their parents". He was subjected to "the same kind of scrutiny" as Burns, who was involved in Patton's selection and helped train him, to earn the role. Patton was selected out of 1,500 auditions. He had never seen the show before his audition, but like Burns was the favorite with preschool test audiences. He said, "I am convinced that I got that part because of a Christopher Walken impression I sometimes do. There's a tape out there, somewhere, with both Steve Burns and myself doing a Blue's Clues scene both as Christopher Walken, which we did at the screen test. I haven't seen the tape, but I know somewhere it still exists". Burns trained Patton to take over the host spot and advised him not to "think of [the show] as children's TV", but rather as "acting and telling the truth". Burns left the show in January 2001, with the transition episodes airing in April 2002.

According to Traci Paige Johnson, one of the producers and creators of Blue's Clues, Patton's character was more like a preschooler and more innocent than Steve. Angela Santomero, another producer and creator, stated that Patton's characterization as Joe brought him closer to the preschool viewer as Joe was more willing to "jump into a problem rather than figure it out first like Steve". Patton liked working on Blue's Clues because, as he stated, "I got to go be a kid for twelve hours a day". He called the show's crew "a real fun little family" and a "well-oiled machine" by the time he joined the show. Patton remained on the show for 48 episodes, until it ended its run in 2006, and also appeared in its spin-off, Blue's Room, which premiered in 2004. Several years later, Patton said he had not yet grasped the enormity of replacing Burns, even after he became a parent and witnessed the show's effect on his own children. He admitted that he preferred when his daughter watched the Steve episodes.

Patton, alongside Burns, appeared in the first episode of the 2019 revival Blue's Clues & You!, reprising their roles as Joe and Steve respectively to help their cousin Josh (who was played by Josh Dela Cruz) learn how to take care of Blue. Patton and Burns continued to make recurring appearances throughout the remainder of the series, and prominently co-starred in the Paramount+ movie Blue's Big City Adventure in 2022.

=== Later roles ===
In 2012, Patton appeared in the short films Awake and Pharmboy, the latter of which was directed by his longtime friend Lawrence Feeney. Mark Finguerra, the director of Awake, was able to look past the potential typecasting of Patton's role in Blue's Clues to cast him in a darker role. Patton had impressed him in an audition for an earlier feature film. Finguerra called Patton a "complete professional [and a] tremendous actor", and enjoyable on set. He appeared in the soap opera One Life to Live, in which he played, in a departure of his previous roles, "a very angry man". In 2014, he appeared in a small movie shot mostly in New Jersey, entitled Lies I Told My Little Sister, directed by William Stribling and starring Lucy Walters. He also stars in Four for Fun, a film by Jason Cook, alongside Jacob Young, Brytni Sarpi, and Annika Foster.

== Personal life ==
Patton called his career, with its mixture of children's television and darker roles in independent films, "an odd experience" and told a reporter that he had spent half his life at Nickelodeon. In 2009, he was cast as Bot, the robot superhero, on the children's show Team Umizoomi through the relationships he had made at Nickelodeon on Blue's Clues. He found working on Team Umizoomi "comforting" because many of the same crew, producers, and creators had also worked on Blue's Clues. It was the first time he had worked as a voice-over artist, unlike on Blue's Clues, when he was able to be more physical acting in front of a blue screen. He said, about Team Umizoomi, "the work the animators have done on it has been superlative". He stated that he enjoyed working on Team Umizoomi because it gave him the opportunity to participate in a show from its inception, which he had missed with Blue's Clues. Patton said his voice performance of Bot, which he modeled on Brent Spiner's performance as the android Data on Star Trek: The Next Generation and was influenced by Mel Blanc's work in the classic Warner Bros. cartoons, "ended up sounding more like my natural voice, with a teeny bit of superhero in there". Despite both roles in Blue's Clues and Team Umizoomi requiring him to sing, he did not consider himself a natural singer and felt that he had to work hard at it. He said, about being cast as Bot, "I get to be a superhero. Who doesn't want to be a superhero?" Patton was the only main cast member to stay on Team Umizoomi for its entire run, voicing Bot in all episodes spread through its four seasons.

Patton is married to his wife Jackie and has two children. They live in Los Angeles. He is active in several charities in the New York City area, including Literacy Inc., the Make-a-Wish Foundation, and the Columbia Presbyterian Hospital, a large children's hospital.

== Filmography ==
=== Film ===
Year	Title	Role	Notes
2005	Black Wine	Todd	
2009	Imagine That	Joe	Uncredited
2012	Pharmboy	Mr. Morris	
2013	Monsters University	Additional voices	
2014	Lies I Told My Little Sister	Josh Davidson	
2017	The Broken Ones	Tim Kelly	
2020	Psycho Escort	Russell	
2020	DieRy	Larry Clark	
2022	Four For Fun	Søren	
2022	Blue's Big City Adventure	Joe	
2025	Gabby's Dollhouse: The Movie	CatRat (voice)	

=== Television ===
Year	Title	Role	Notes
2002	The Today Show	Himself	Episode: "26 April 2002"
2002–06	Blue's Clues	Joe	48 episodes
2002	Maury	Himself	Episode: "13 November 2002"
2003	Nickelodeon Kids' Choice Awards '03	Himself	Uncredited
2004–07	Blue's Room	Joe	12 Episodes
2010–15	Team Umizoomi	Bot (US version)	80 episodes
2011	Blue Bloods	Bellhop	Episode: "Age of Innocence"
2011	Nurse Jackie	Husband	Episode: "Mitten"
2012	Damages	Dry Cleaning Boy at Hewes & Associates	Episode: "Have You Met the Eel Yet?"
2015–18	Clarence	Mr. Reese, additional voices (voice)	30 episodes
2016–17	Creative Galaxy	Chef Zesty (voice)	5 episodes
2018	The Myth of Robo Wonder Kid	Birt, Mr. Mudtroll (voices)	TV Short
2018	The Church of What's Happening Now	Himself	Episode: "Donovan Patton"
2018	We Bare Bears	Additional voices	Episode: "Paperboyz"
2019–24	Blue's Clues & You!	Joe	Recurring role
2020	Sidewalks Entertainment	Himself – Guest	Episode: "Holidays with Josh and Donovan"
2021–present	Gabby's Dollhouse	CatRat	Main Role
2022	Meet the Voxels	Deuce	Episode: "Pilot"
2025	Devil May Cry	Bloodstryke (voice)	

=== Video games ===
Year	Title	Role	Notes
2002	Blue's Clues: Blue's Preschool	Joe	
2002	Blue's Clues Kindergarten	Joe	
2003	Blue's Clues: Blue Takes You to School	Joe	
2012	Nickelodeon Dance 2	Bot (voice)	
2013	Grand Theft Auto V	Actor	Uncredited (Also additional motion capture)
2015	Lego Jurassic World	Voice Cast	
2015	Lego Dimensions	Additional voices	
2015	Star Wars: The Old Republic – Knights of the Fallen Empire	Additional voices	
2015	Halo 5: Guardians	Additional voices	
2017	Horizon Zero Dawn	Gildun	The Frozen Wilds downloadable content
2017	Minecraft: Story Mode – Season 2	Warden	
2017	Horizon Zero Dawn: The Frozen Wilds	Gildun	
2018	God of War	Additional voices	
2021	Halo Infinite	Additional voices	
2023	Horizon Forbidden West	Gildun	The Burning Shores downloadable content

=== Shorts ===
Year	Title	Role
2012	It's Not You, It's Me	Arguing Man
2012	Beyond Belief	Shaina's Dad
2013	Awake	Eddie
2015	Clarence Shorts: Big Boy	Mr. Reese (voice)
2016	Clarence Shorts: Beans	Mr. Reese (voice)
2016	Clarence Shorts: Sticky Clarence	Mr. Reese (voice)
2019	The Murder	Psychiatrist
2019	The Anniversary	Psychiatrist

=== Video ===
- Dr. Ice (1996) – Waiter
- It's Joe Time (2002) – Joe
- Blue's Clues: Meet Joe! (2002) – Joe
- Blue's Big Band (2003) – Joe
- Blue Takes You to School (2003) – Joe
- Blue's Biggest Stories (2006) – Joe
- Blue's Jobs (2006) – Joe
- Meet Blue's Baby Brother (2006) – Joe
- Fred's Birthday (2006) – Joe

== Works cited ==
- Barron, Natania (January 25, 2010). "Donovan Patton Interview". GeekDad. Wired. Archived from the original on November 11, 2014.
- Tracy, Diane. (2002). Blue's Clues for Success: The 8 Secrets Behind a Phenomenal Business. New York: Kaplan Publishing. ISBN 0-7931-5376-X.
