= Deep Sea Recovery Efforts =

Studio album by Steve Burns and the Struggle
- Released: 2009
- Genre: Indie rock, dream pop, alternative rock
- Length: 36:56
- Producer: Richard Johnson Jr.

Steve Burns chronology
Songs for Dustmites (2003)	Deep Sea Recovery Efforts (2009)	Foreverywhere (2017)

Deep Sea Recovery Efforts is the second studio album by American musician and actor Steve Burns. It is a follow-up to his 2003 debut Songs for Dustmites (2003).

== Track listings ==
All tracks are written by Steve Burns except where noted.

No.	Title	Length
1.	"Projecting"	3:11
2.	"The Newton Creek Song"	3:05
3.	"The Unbeliever"	4:00
4.	"Strange [By Galaxie 500]"	4:10
5.	"A Slightly Bigger Space"	4:16
6.	"Tiger Tiger (The Angie Song)"	3:34
7.	"Lords of Cobble Hill"	5:02
8.	"Leviticus"	4:37
9.	"A Very Troubled Day"	5:02
