= Steven Drozd =

American musician

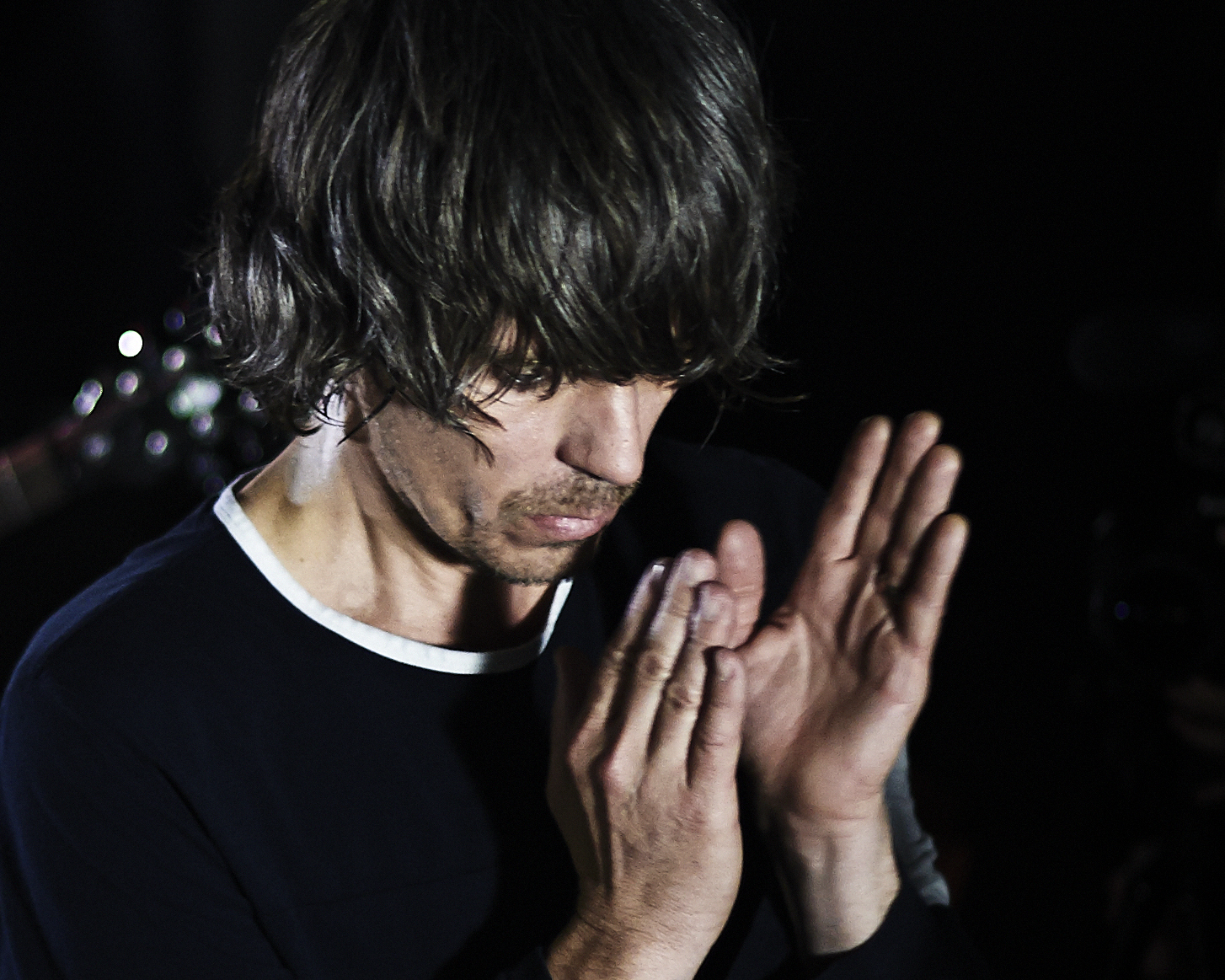
- Drozd in 2013

Background information
- Born: Steven Gregory Drozd; June 11, 1969 (age 57); Houston, Texas, United States
- Genre: Alternative rock
- Occupations: Musician; composer; songwriter
- Instruments: Vocals; guitar; bass; keyboards; drums
- Years active: 1983–present
- Label: Warner Bros.

Steven Gregory Drozd (born June 11, 1969) is an American musician. He was a composer, multi-instrumentalist, and songwriter for the Flaming Lips from 1991 to 2024.

== Early life ==
Drozd was born in Houston, Texas, and grew up in Richmond and Rosenberg, Texas, with three brothers and a sister. He attended George Junior High and B. F. Terry High School. His father, Vernon, was a member of the polka band Vernon Drozd and the Texas Brass. At the age of ten, he began playing drums with his father's band and later played piano in various country honky-tonk groups. After high school, Drozd moved to Oklahoma City and performed, mainly on drums, with a number of underground bands in the area.

== The Flaming Lips ==
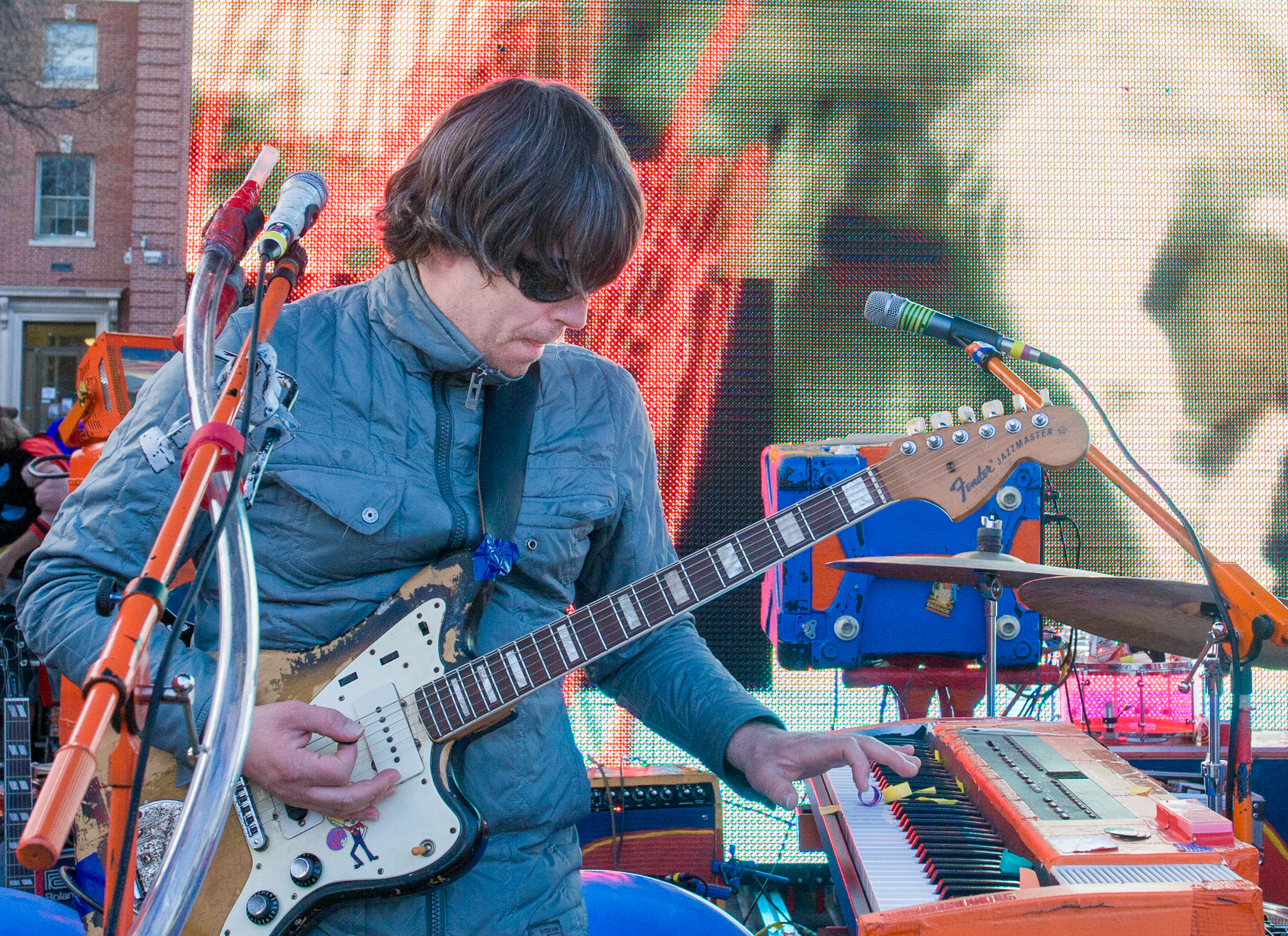
Drozd playing both keyboard and guitar at the same time

Drozd joined the Flaming Lips in 1991 as a drummer. While his style is influenced by the drum sounds of the 1970s, his time spent with his father's polka band helped him develop a sense of delicacy and syncopation. His thick grooves, with episodes of odd-time funk, are interspersed with straight-ahead rock, mixing various genres. From 1991 to 1996, Drozd only performed drums live; he assumed complete guitar and keyboard duties following Ronald Jones's departure, only performing drums live on the studio albums until his firing from the band in 2024.

== Other ventures ==
He is the songwriting/musician half of You in Me, a Neil Diamond-inspired duo, with Alan Novey on vocals. Drozd writes the songs, and he and Novey perform them as a tribute to Diamond.

He and Steve Burns created the band StevenSteven, a children's psychedelic music project.

The artist Imagene Peise, an alias for a collaboration between Drozd and Wayne Coyne, records elevator music-style covers and originals, culled from the home recordings of Drozd with imagery and myth from the imagination of Coyne.

Drozd and Coyne have a second group together called Electric Würms, with Drozd taking the lead role in the band. Influenced by prog rock, krautrock, and punk rock, their goal is to explore the outer reaches of traditional rock music, as well as to perform Flaming Lips deeper cuts. Nashville-based Linear Downfall completes the ensemble.

== Contributing work ==
Drozd has appeared on a number of recordings of other artists, including Elliott Smith's From a Basement on the Hill, Jay Farrar's Sebastopol and ThirdShiftGrottoSlack and Steve Burns' Songs for Dustmites. Drozd is featured on the online release of Cake's B-sides and Rarities (2007).

In 2013 Drozd created and directed a volunteer group of music students at ACMUCO called the Mutating Cell Ensemble, whose goal is to experiment with polyrhythm and repetition. They have performed once. Drozd composed and performed on the song "Mattress Warehouse" by Foxygen, off their album ...And Star Power, released on October 14, 2014.

== Film work ==
In the Flaming Lips' film Christmas on Mars (2008), he plays Major Syrtis, the main character of the film. Drozd has appeared on Noggin's Jack's Big Music Show, with Jon Stewart and Steve Burns.

In 2020, he scored the TV series Moonbase 8.

== Discography ==
=== Solo ===
| Year | Title | Notes |
|---|---|---|
| 2021 | The Ten Commandments | collaborative soundtrack album to the 1923 film, with Scott Amendola and Steve Berlin. |

=== Imagene Peise ===
| Year | Title | Notes |
|---|---|---|
| 2007 | Atlas Eets Christmas | collaborative project with Wayne Coyne |

=== You in Me ===
| Year | Title | Notes |
|---|---|---|
| 2011 | "Hot Coffee"/"The Drifter" | Neil Diamond-inspired collaborative project with Alan Novey. |

=== Electric Würms ===
| Year | Title | Notes |
|---|---|---|
| 2014 | Musik Die Schwer zu Twerk | band project including Wayne Coyne |

=== StevenSteven ===
| Year | Title | Notes |
|---|---|---|
| 2017 | Foreverywhere | collaborative project with Steve Burns |
