= Foreverywhere =

Children's album by Steve Burns and Steven Drozd

Studio album by STEVENSTEVEN
- Released: February 24, 2017
- Genre: Pop, rock, children's music, neo-psychedelia
- Length: 50:11

Foreverywhere is an album of children's music by American musician and actor Steve Burns and collaborator Steven Drozd under the band name STEVENSTEVEN. The duo worked previously on Burns's solo albums.

== Background ==
After Drozd helped Burns record his first solo album, Songs for Dustmites, the two musicians became friends as Burns was a longtime admirer of Drozd's band The Flaming Lips. A few years later, the duo recorded a children's song called "I Hog the Ground" for the Nickelodeon show Jack's Big Music Show and enjoyed themselves so much that they decided to create a children's album together.

"We deliberately took kiddie-cliché ideas and tried to elevate them, which is why there's a unicorn and a rainbow princess," Burns said about the album. "The kids I've met are very emotionally complex people. I just don't think that there's much difference between what makes music great for adults and what makes music great for kids."

== Promotion ==
Music videos were created for the songs "OK Toilet Bowl", "The Unicorn and Princess Rainbow", and "A Fact is a Gift That You Give Your Brain".

Burns and Drozd performed songs from the album live at the Brooklyn Bowl on February 26, 2017.

In a rare television appearance, Burns appeared on TMZ in March 2017 to discuss the album and its fourth track "OK Toilet Bowl". On the song, Burns said, "We call that a song about courage because, that age group, that's a big fear of theirs actually and we wanted to address that."

== Adaptation ==
On July 26, 2019, Burns announced via Instagram that Foreverywhere was being adapted into an audio book:

"These are the things you need to know: A lonesome prog rock Finalcorn. A cosmic guitar shredding princess. A giant named Rick. Monsters. Ramen shops. Friendship. Music. FOREVERYWHERE is about a lot of things. Add this Audible Original to your wish list; Audible members, you can get it FREE on Aug 1st! Based on the kids album I made with @stevendrozd. Written by @bitchinville, narrated by yours truly and featuring @carlyciarrocchi as Princess Rainbow. Link in bio, yo."

- Original Instagram post

Six days later on August 1, 2019, the audio book was released exclusively to Audible. It features narration from Burns as well as Carly Ciarrocchi and Stephanie Mayers.

== Track listings ==
All tracks are written by Steve Burns and Steven Drozd

No.	Title	Length
1.	"The Unicorn and Princess Rainbow"	5:11
2.	"Mimic Octopus"	3:05
3.	"A Fact is a Gift That You Give Your Brain"	2:38
4.	"OK Toilet Bowl"	3:27
5.	"Space Rock Rock"	3:02
6.	"The Lonely Unicorn is Never Giving Up!"	4:03
7.	"If You're Ginormous and You Know It"	3:56
8.	"I Won't Let You Change Who I Am"	3:29
9.	"The Happy Then Sad Then Triumphant Spider"	6:37
10.	"I'm Up"	4:05
11.	"Foreverywhere"	10:38
Total length:		50:11
