= Steve Burns =

American actor (born 1973)

- Burns in 2026
- Born: Steven Michael Burns; October 9, 1973 (age 53); Boyertown, Pennsylvania, U.S.
- Education: DeSales University
- Occupations: Actor; musician; television host
- Years active: 1994–present
- Musical career
- Genres: Indie rock; alternative rock
- Instruments: Vocals; guitar; keyboards
- Label: PIAS

Steven Michael Burns (born October 9, 1973) is an American actor, musician, and television host. He is best known for portraying a fictional version of himself as the host of the children's television series Blue's Clues from 1996 until 2002, for which he was nominated for a Daytime Emmy in 2001. He has also done extensive voice-over work for advertising, including the "Snickers satisfies" advertising campaign.

Following his departure from Blue's Clues, Burns focused on his music career, releasing the solo albums Songs for Dustmites (2003) and Deep Sea Recovery Efforts (2009). He later formed the children's music band STEVENSTEVEN with longtime collaborator Steven Drozd, releasing the album Foreverywhere in 2017.

Burns reprised his role on the 2019 reboot Blue's Clues & You! as a recurring character and cousin of the franchise's new host, Josh Dela Cruz. He also wrote and directed several episodes of the rebooted series until its cancellation in 2024.

== Early life and career ==
Steven Michael Burns was born on October 9, 1973, in Boyertown, Pennsylvania, to Joseph Burns Jr. (1938–2015) and Janet Burns (née Petaccio). He has two older sisters named Karen and Jennifer. His father served in the U.S. Navy and later became the human resources director of Safeguard Business Systems. He attended Boyertown Area Senior High School in Berks County, graduating in 1992.

During his high school and college years, Burns played in several bands: Sudden Impact US, Nine Pound Truck, and the Ivys, the latter of which he called a "Morrissey rip-off band". He studied theatre under an acting scholarship at DeSales University in Center Valley, Pennsylvania, in the Lehigh Valley, where he was discovered by an agent. He dropped out of school and moved to New York City to become a professional actor. He lived in a basement apartment near Times Square, finding his first success as a voice-over artist for ads and making appearances on Homicide: Life on the Street and Law & Order.

== Blue's Clues ==
In 1994, Burns auditioned for Blue's Clues, thinking it was a voice-over role for a game show. He modeled his audition performance after Christopher Walken. He had long hair and an earring. "I was a bit of a skate rat," he said. Initially, the Nickelodeon executives were not supportive of Burns hosting their new show; in subsequent auditions, the show's creators requested that he dress more conservatively. (Burns reported that the creators, in a call-back phone conversation, asked him, "Could you not look like yourself tomorrow morning?") It became apparent, however, that he was the favorite with preschool test audiences. Executive producer and co-creator Traci Paige Johnson reported that of the 100 people they auditioned, Burns was "the realest". As Alice Wilder, Nickelodeon's Director of Research and Development, said: "There was just something about this kid, who was fresh out of Pennsylvania, who just knew where to look in the camera to really talk to kids. He was just right."

Blue's Clues premiered on September 8, 1996, on Nick Jr. and was an instant hit due to Burns's performances as much as the show's format. He became "a superstar" among his audience and their parents, but unknown to everyone else, and enjoyed what he called being a "micro-celebrity, about as small a celebrity as you can be". As The New York Times reported, he "developed an avid following among both preteen girls and mothers. The former send torrents of e-mail; the latter scrutinize the show with an intensity that might make even Elmo, the red Muppet, blush." In 2000, People included Burns in their annual list of America's most eligible bachelors. According to writer Diane Tracy, Burns was "destined for the part". Also, according to Tracy, Burns was not the typical children's television host: "There is nothing syrupy about him—his humor is sometimes borderline offbeat, but never inappropriate for preschoolers."

The show was filmed in a studio in Tribeca, Manhattan. Burns became "very involved" with the production of Blue's Clues from the beginning. One of the most challenging aspects of hosting the show was performing on the "blue screen" before the animation was added. Burns called it "maddening" and likened it to "acting at the bottom of a swimming pool".

=== Departure ===
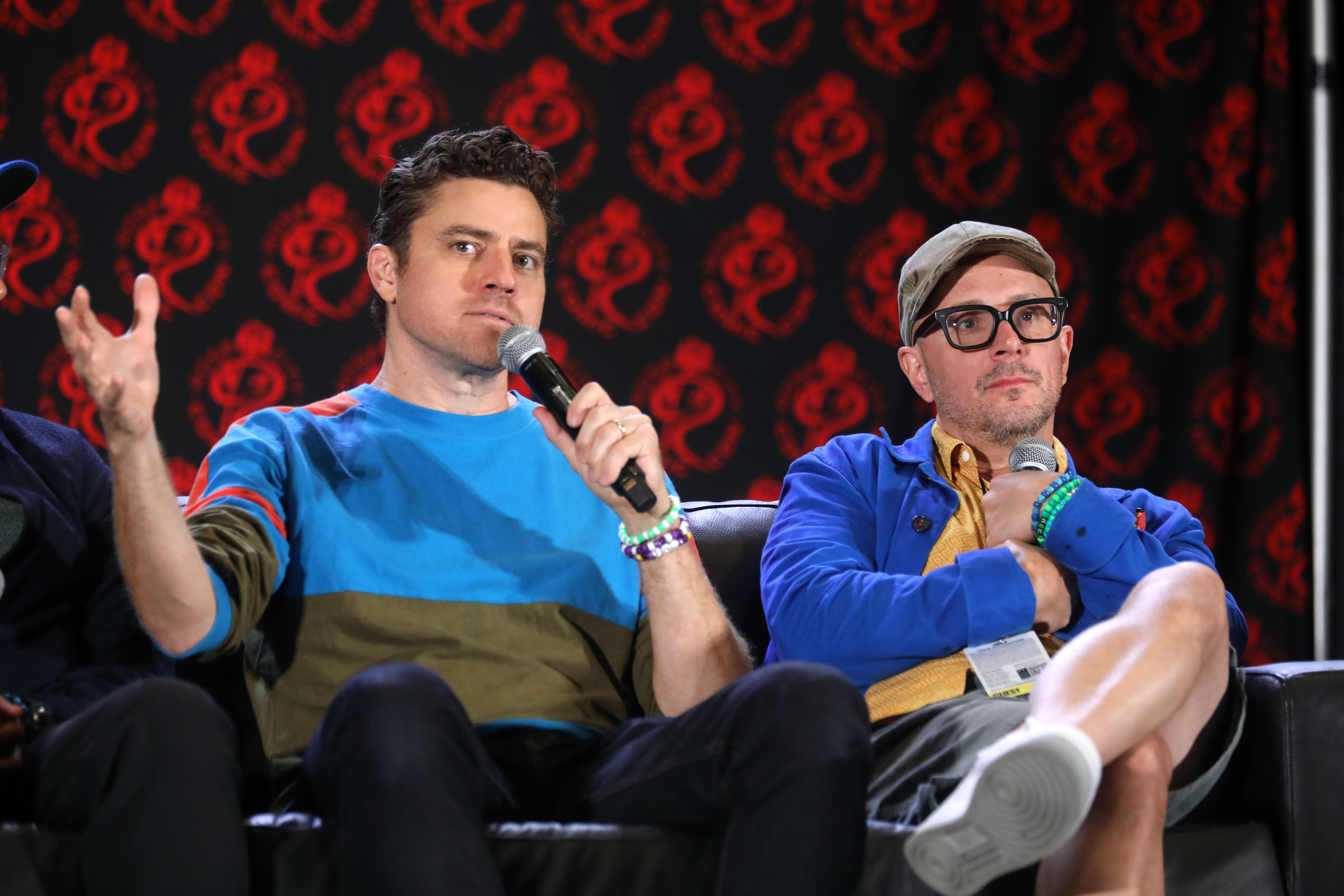
Donovan Patton ("Joe" on Blue's Clues, left) and Burns at 2024 Rose City Comic Con at the Oregon Convention Center in Portland, Oregon

After almost six years and nearly 100 episodes, Burns announced he was leaving Blue's Clues in January 2001. In his final episodes, which aired as a three-part special on April 29, 2002, "Steve" leaves for college and introduces new host Donovan Patton as his younger brother, Joe.

According to Johnson, Burns never wanted to become a "children's host". He loved kids, but stated, "he could not make a life-long career out of it." Burns went on by saying, "I knew I wasn't going to be doing children's television all my life, mostly because I refused to lose my hair on a kid's TV show, and it was happening, fast." The day following the filming of his final episode for the show, he shaved his head – something that he wanted to do for several years, but the show's producers would not allow. He explained in a 2016 interview that "a lot of the original people on the show, like the people who created it, were all moving on to other careers. It just felt like time." In a 2022 Variety interview, Burns revealed that he suffered from clinical depression while on the show.

Burns's departure led to the resurfacing of rumors that had circulated about him since 1998, including death from a heroin overdose, being killed in a car accident, and (similar to rumors about Paul McCartney in 1966) being replaced with a look-alike. Burns made an appearance on The Rosie O'Donnell Show to dispel these rumors, and he and co-creator Angela Santomero appeared on The Today Show to help concerned parents extinguish the fears of kids who may have heard these rumors.

Burns consulted on the casting for the revival of Blue's Clues, titled Blue's Clues & You! and hosted by Josh Dela Cruz. He and Patton reprised their roles in the premiere episode to welcome their "cousin" Josh, as well as on a recurring basis for the rest of the series. Burns and Patton also made prominent appearances in the Paramount+ movie Blue's Big City Adventure in 2022. In addition, Burns wrote and directed several episodes of the revival.

Burns appeared in videos for the twenty-fifth anniversary of the premiere of Blue's Clues in 2021, including a widely watched Twitter video on Nick Jr.'s Twitter account in which he – in character as the host of the show – explained reassuringly that he had never forgotten the viewers after leaving to go to college, and marveling at how much each of them had experienced since then.

== Music, film & television career ==
After leaving Blue's Clues in 2002, Burns began working on material for his first album, Songs for Dustmites. The album was released by PIAS Recordings in August 2003. He posted eleven songs on his webpage and then realizing he needed help with drums and arrangements went to Steven Drozd of the Flaming Lips for advice. Drozd assisted Burns with six tracks, Lips bassist Michael Ivins engineered the album, and longtime Lips producer Dave Fridmann produced it. One of the songs from the album, "Mighty Little Man", is used as the opening theme for the CBS series Young Sheldon. Burns made several appearances on the series beginning in January 2022, playing a Star Trek enthusiast whom the title character meets.

Burns started a band, Steve Burns and the Struggle, and completed his second album, Deep Sea Recovery Efforts, which was released in 2009. Members of the Struggle include Drozd and Ryan Smith of A Million Billion.

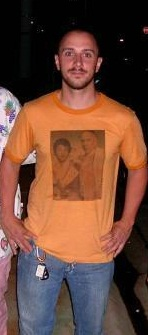
Burns, c. 2008

Burns acted in the 2007 horror-comedy film Netherbeast Incorporated with Darrell Hammond and Dave Foley, playing the part of a vampire. In 2008, he played an astronaut in Christmas on Mars, a science fiction film from the Flaming Lips. In March 2012, he appeared in the YouTube comedy series The Professionals.

He appeared in DeSales University's production of Amadeus as the title character in 2007 and also appeared in The Comedy of Errors.

In late 2016, Burns released a children's album with Drozd, titled Foreverywhere under the name "STEVENSTEVEN". They released a video of the album's first song, "The Unicorn and Princess Rainbow".

Burns made a guest appearance on Tim Kubart's 2018 children's album Building Blocks.

== Podcast ==
In June 2025, it was announced that Burns would be starting a podcast for adults called Alive. Produced in partnership with Lemonada Media, the weekly series premiered on September 17, 2025.

The podcast is aimed at an adult audience, particularly those who grew up watching Burns on Blue's Clues, and focuses on reflective conversations about topics such as mental health, relationships, and broader questions about modern life. Burns has described the project as a continuation of the interactive and emotionally supportive tone of Blue's Clues, adapted for adulthood.

Episodes typically feature one-on-one conversations with guests from a variety of backgrounds, including academics, creators, and public figures, with an emphasis on open dialogue and shared exploration of complex issues. The show has been characterized as “funny, tender, and just a little weird,” and structured around the idea of listening and engaging with the audience rather than presenting definitive answers.

In 2026, Burns was nominated for an Ambie Award (Awards for Excellence in Audio) in the category of Best Podcast Host or Hosts for his work on the show.

== Personal life ==
After residing in Williamsburg, Brooklyn for much of his adult life, Burns told the New York Post in 2020 that he had been living mostly near the Catskill Mountains for the past four years.

== Filmography ==
=== TV series ===
- Blue's Clues – himself (also producer, co-producer, and consulting producer on some episodes)
- Blue's Clues & You! – himself, Mapbook (voice) (also directed and wrote several episodes)
- Figure It Out – himself, panelist (1999)
- Homicide: Life on the Street – David Tarnofski
- Jack's Big Music Show – himself/performer along with Steven Drozd – episode: "Ground Hog Day"
- Law & Order – Kevin Jeffries
- Little Bear – Mr. Skunk (voice; uncredited) – episode: "The Painting/The Kiss/The Wedding"
- The Bedtime Business Song – himself
- The Early Show – himself
- The Panel – himself
- The Professionals – Investor X
- The Rosie O'Donnell Show – himself
- Today – himself
- Yes, Dear – himself (uncredited) – episode: "Arm-prins"
- Young Sheldon – theme song performer, Nathan

=== TV specials ===
- The 42nd Annual New York Emmy Awards – himself/presenter
- Macy's Thanksgiving Day Parade – himself

=== Video games ===
- Blue's 123 Time Activities – himself
- Blue's ABC Time Activities – himself
- Blue's Alphabet Book - himself
- Blue's Art Time Activities – himself
- Blue's Big Musical – himself
- Blue's Birthday Adventure – himself
- Blue's Reading Time Activities – himself
- Blue's Treasure Hunt – himself

=== Shorts ===
- Blue's Birthday – himself
- La lecon – Arthur Knudson
- The Bill (2001) – Bill
- Hot Pants – Ben

=== Stage ===
- Amadeus – Mozart
- The Comedy of Errors – Dromio
- Steve Burns: Alive (2026) - himself (also co-writer)

=== Movies ===
- Blue's Big Musical Movie – himself
- Christmas on Mars – Major Lowell
- Marie and Bruce – Fred
- Netherbeast Incorporated – Otto Granberry
- Who Framed Jesus – The Narrator
- Blue's Big City Adventure – himself

=== Documentaries ===
- The Fearless Freaks – himself
- I Love You, You Hate Me – himself

== Discography ==
- Songs for Dustmites (2003)
- Deep Sea Recovery Efforts (2009) (as Steve Burns and the Struggle)
- Foreverywhere (2017) (with Steven Drozd, as STEVENSTEVEN)
