= Blue's Big City Adventure =

2022 live-action/animated film directed by Matt Stawski

- Official release poster
- Directed by: Matt Stawski
- Written by: Angela Santomero; Liz Maccie
- Based on: Blue's Clues & Blue's Clues & You! by Traci Paige Johnson; Todd Kessler; Angela Santomero
- Produced by: Traci Paige Johnson; Angela Santomero
- Starring: Josh Dela Cruz; Traci Paige Johnson; Steve Burns; Donovan Patton; BD Wong; Ali Stroker; Taboo; Alex Winter; Phillipa Soo; Steven Pasquale
- Cinematography: Derek McKane
- Edited by: Scott Richter
- Music by: Alex Geringas; Anthony Green
- Production companies: Paramount+; Nickelodeon Movies; Nickelodeon Animation Studio; 9 Story Media Group; Brown Bag Films; Boxel Animation; Line by Line Media
- Distributed by: Paramount+
- Release dates: November 18, 2022 (Paramount+); March 28, 2023 (DVD); May 29, 2023 (TV)
- Running time: 74 minutes
- Countries: United States; Canada
- Language: English

Blue's Big City Adventure (previously titled Blue's Broadway Dreams) is a 2022 live-action animated musical comedy film. It is the second installment of the Blue's Clues film series, and a standalone sequel to Blue's Big Musical Movie which itself is based on the Nick Jr. Channel television series, Blue's Clues, based on its revival/sequel Nick Jr. Channel television series, Blue's Clues & You!, and the 19th episode of that show's third season. Directed by Matt Stawski, the film stars Traci Paige Johnson as the voice of Blue, alongside Josh Dela Cruz, Donovan Patton, and Steve Burns. As the events of the film take place after the original series and during the fourth season of Blue's Clues & You!, the film follows Josh and Blue as they travel to New York City to audition for a Broadway musical.

It was released on Paramount+ on November 18, 2022, and received positive reviews from critics. The film had its television premiere on Nick Jr. in the United Kingdom on December 5, 2022, and Nickelodeon in the United States on May 29, 2023.

== Plot ==
Josh has dreamed of singing in a Broadway musical since he was a kid. One day, he receives a letter from Rainbow Puppy, a friend of Periwinkle, telling him to come to New York City later that day to audition for her new Broadway show, Happiness is Magic. Josh is excited, though also nervous, but then receives encouragement from the others. Mr. Salt puts the address of the theater in Josh's handy-dandy notebook. Blue and Josh later leave for New York City in a bus called the Skidoo Express.

Upon arriving in New York City, Josh decides to look in the handy-dandy notebook to see where the theater is, but realizes it's missing. Without it, Josh does not know where the theater is. So, Blue decides that they play Blue's Clues to figure out where Josh's audition is, with help from the viewer as usual. During their search for clues, they also come across Broadway actor, Ali Stroker, who teaches them that practicing for something makes it less overwhelming. They also encounter singer, Taboo, who helps them find them music to give them more confidence. They eventually find all three clues: a piano, rainbow curtains, and a stage, and discover they simply need to find a theater with a piano, rainbow curtains, and a stage.

Back at the Blue's Clues house, the others discover that the handy-dandy notebook was accidentally left behind by Josh, so Mr. Salt, Tickety Tock, and Slippery Soap head off to the city in a jet to return the notebook to Josh. They then visit Steve at the Blue Prints Detective Agency for help. They also get help from Joe at the present store to create balloons spelling Josh and Blue's names as a message to them, informing them they're searching for them, though the balloons later deflate. Meanwhile, at the theater where the auditions are being held, Rainbow Puppy and the director are unimpressed by most of the acts.

After they had figured out Blue's Clues, Josh and Blue then hitch a ride to the theater in a taxi vehicle, though do not know the exact address to the theater. During the ride, they spot Steve, Joe, Mr. Salt, Tickety Tock, and Slippery Soap, and they join them. Mr. Salt gives Josh his handy-dandy notebook and Mr. Salt tells the address of the theater to the taxi driver: 12345 Broadway. By the time they arrive, however, the auditions have already ended. Josh sings on stage anyway as Mr. Salt had an idea. Rainbow Puppy and the director see Josh singing on the Jumbotron and return to the theater to tell him they want him to play the lead role in the show. Blue, Josh, and the whole gang perform in the show together, which is praised by the audience. After the show finishes, Josh thanks the viewer for all their help.

In a mid-credit scene, as he is getting ready for bed, Josh tells the audience that the movie is over and he and Blue sing the "So Long Song".

== Cast ==
- Josh Dela Cruz as Josh
- Steve Burns as Steve
- Donovan Patton as Joe
- BD Wong as Director
- Max Darwin as Audition Person #1
- Adam John Richardson as Audition Person #2
- Kara Irene Mikula as Audition Person #3
- Phillipa Soo as Audition Person #4
- Evelyn Lee as Kid #1
- Austin Elle Fisher as Kid #2
- Sid Kamat as Kid #3
- Sebastian Ortiz as Kid #4
- Summer Rae Daney as Kid #5
- Cameron Keitt as Kid #6
- Allegra Tumbleson as Kid #7
- Daniel Shin as Kid #8
- Ali Stroker as herself
- Taboo as himself
- Alex Winter as Cab Driver
- Steven Pasquale as Janitor
- Jessica Gower as Dancer

=== Voice cast ===
- Traci Paige Johnson as Blue
- Brianna Bryan as Rainbow Puppy
- Nick Balaban as Mr. Salt
- Ava Augustin as Tickety Tock
- Gisèle Rousseau as Mrs. Pepper
- Breeze Dango as Cuppa Coffee
- Tianna SwamiNathan as Young Bird
- Joseph Motiki as Adult Bird
- Hope Cassandra as 20 Something
- Jacob Soley as Slippery Soap
- Shazdeh Kapadia as Sidetable Drawer
- Doug Murray as Mailbox
- Lisa Norton as NYC Mailbox
- Cory Doran as Trash Can

== Production ==
On July 12, 2021, it was reported that a movie based on Blue's Clues & You! will be made to mark the 25th anniversary of the Blue's Clues franchise. Directed by Matt Stawski and written by Angela Santomero and Liz Maccie, the film began production, with Cinematography by Derek McKane, Production Design by Alex M. Calle, and Costume Design by Caitlin Doukas, in summer 2021. On February 15, 2022, the title was revealed as Blue's Big City Adventure.

== Soundtrack ==
Blue's Big City Adventure (Original Motion Picture Soundtrack)

Soundtrack album by Alex Geringas
- Released: November 18, 2022
- Genre: Children's music
- Length: 28:38
- Label: Republic Records Kids & Family

The film's soundtrack album was released on digital platforms by Republic Records Kids & Family label, on the same day. To promote it, a single version of "On Our Way" was released on October 7, 2022.

No.	Title	Length
1.	"Blue's Big City Adventure (Opening)"	0:29
2.	"Brand New Day"	3:04
3.	"Mail Time Barbershop (Movie Version)"	0:07
4.	"Mail Time (Movie Version)"	0:11
5.	"We Just Got a Letter (Movie Version)"	0:30
6.	"Got the Audition"	0:12
7.	"On Our Way Skidoo"	0:36
8.	"On Our Way"	3:07
9.	"Happiness Is Magic (Mr. Salt)"	0:33
10.	"How To Play Blue's Clues (Movie Version)"	1:26
11.	"The Planet Song (Movie Version)"	1:33
12.	"That's My Song"	3:57
13.	"We Just Figured Out Blue's Clues (Movie Version)"	0:41
14.	"Rock Blue's Clues & You (Theme)"	1:16
15.	"Happiness Is Magic (Audition)"	1:42
16.	"Happiness Is Magic (Broadway)"	3:30
17.	"Closing Song (Movie Version)"	0:34
18.	"Happy Puppy Dance"	0:15
19.	"Blue's Big City Adventure (Score Suite)"	4:55
Total length:		28:38

== Release ==
The film's trailer was previewed by Josh Dela Cruz at PaleyWKND on October 1, 2022, and later released online on October 3, 2022. Blue's Big City Adventure was released on Paramount+ on November 18, 2022. In a promotion for the film sponsored by Nickelodeon, minor league ice hockey team Atlanta Gladiators wore Blue's Clues jerseys for their match against the Orlando Solar Bears on November 4, 2022. The film was released on DVD on March 28, 2023. The movie made its linear premiere on Nickelodeon in the United States on May 29, 2023.

== Reception ==
On the review aggregator site Rotten Tomatoes, 83% of six critics' reviews have given the film a positive review, with an average rating of 7.3/10.

Marco Vito Oddo of Collider gave the film a "B" rating, writing "As a result, Blue's Big City Adventure is a movie aimed at preschoolers that's also enjoyable for adults, with exciting musical numbers that help break the simple story and explore the street art history of New York City." In a positive review, Calum Marsh of The New York Times praised Dela Cruz's performance, saying he brought "unbridled charisma to a role that is basically a glorified kindergarten teacher". Nate Adams of The Only Critic wrote, "A harmless, colorful and cheery addition to the Blue's Clues canon, Blue's Big City Adventure has something for everyone."

A critic for Decider gave the film a negative review, criticizing it for not having enough Blue's clues, poor characterization, and for weak, confusing worldbuilding.

== See also ==
- List of Blue's Clues characters
- Blue's Clues & You!
