= Josh Dela Cruz =

American actor (born 1989)

Joshua Dela Cruz
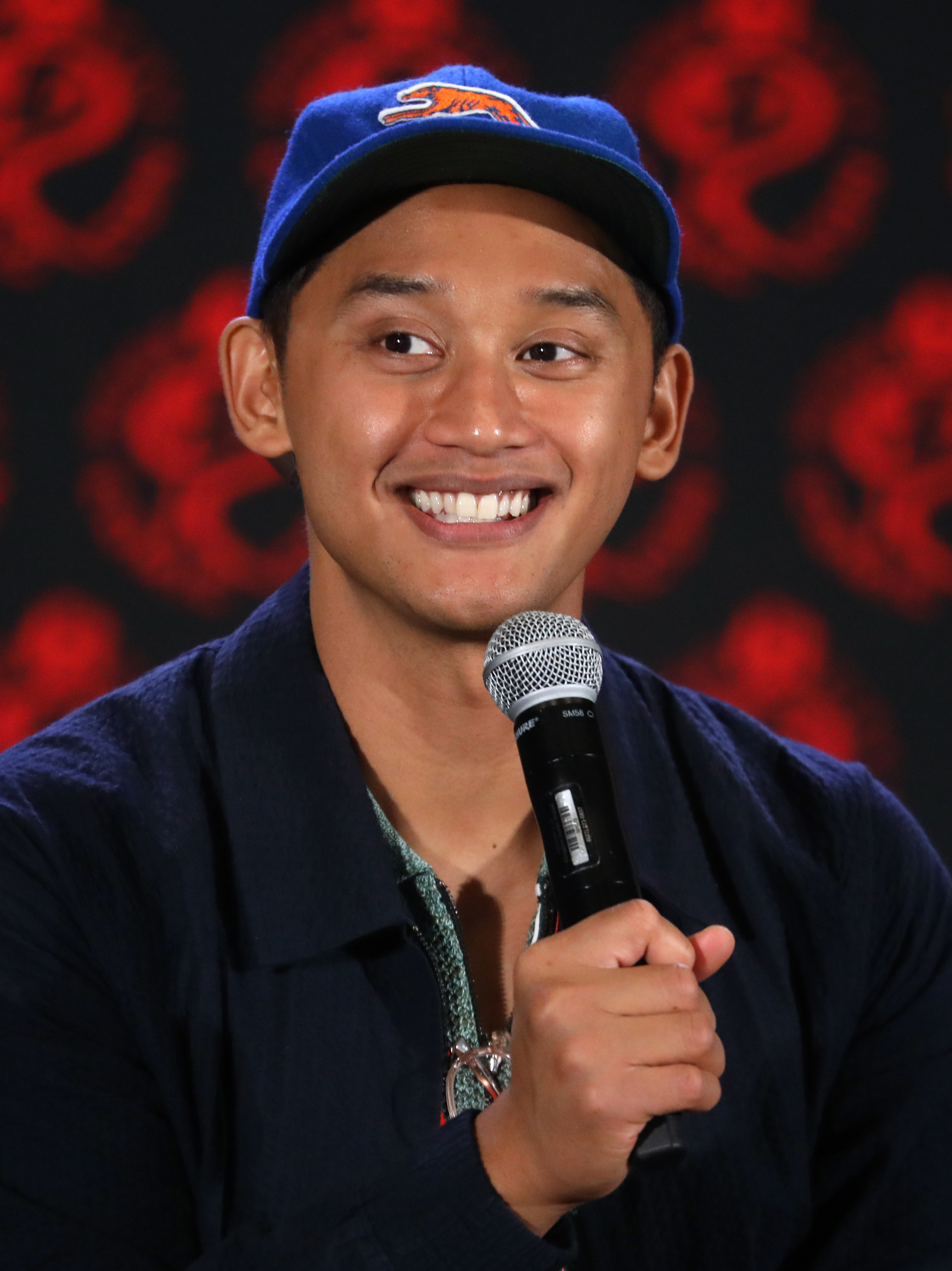
- Dela Cruz in 2024
- Born: March 23, 1989 (age 37); United Arab Emirates
- Education: Montclair State University
- Occupation: Actor
- Years active: 2011–present
- Known for: Josh in Blue's Clues & You!
- Spouse: Amanda Dela Cruz

Joshua Dela Cruz (born March 23, 1989) is an American actor. He played a fictional version of himself as the host in the preschool series Blue's Clues & You!. He was the third and most recent host of the Blue's Clues franchise, after Steve Burns and Donovan Patton.

== Early life and education ==
Dela Cruz was born in the United Arab Emirates to Filipino parents of Bicolano and Ilocano descent. He was raised in New Milford, New Jersey. He graduated from New Milford High School in 2007 and from Montclair State University in 2011.

== Career ==
After graduating from Montclair, Dela Cruz performed in several Broadway and off-Broadway productions, including Aladdin, Here Lies Love, The King and I and Encores!: Merrily We Roll Along.

On September 13, 2018, Nickelodeon announced that Dela Cruz would be Blue's Clues & You!'s host after auditioning over 3,000 actors. Growing up in New Jersey, Dela Cruz watched the original show with his younger sister. Steve Burns, the first host of the original series, participated in the casting process. Dela Cruz also portrayed Josh in two guest appearances in The Tiny Chef Show.

== Personal life ==
Dela Cruz met his wife Amanda Phillips while they both attended Montclair State University. In 2015, he proposed to her in Central Park while filming a dance duet to Frank Sinatra's "You Make Me Feel So Young".

== Credits ==
=== Television ===
- Blue's Clues & You! – Josh
- Bull – Adam Bunson
- Time After Time – Box Office Attendant
- The Tiny Chef Show – Josh
- Law & Order Toronto: Criminal Intent - Jerome Abalos

=== Film ===
- Blue's Big City Adventure – Josh

=== Video games ===
- Nick Jr. Party Adventure - Josh

=== Theater ===
- Waterfall: A New Musical – Noppon (2023 production)
- Maybe Happy Ending - Oliver (2016 production)
- Aladdin – Ensemble, Aladdin (understudy, 2013–2018)
- Here Lies Love – (2013 production)
- Encores!: Merrily We Roll Along – (2012 production)
- The King and I – Lun Tha (2011 and 2012 productions)
- Here Lies Love – Ninoy Aquino (2026 production, Los Angeles)
