= Blue's Clues Kindergarten =

2002 video game

- Developer: ImaginEngine
- Publisher: Infogrames
- Series: Blue's Clues
- Platforms: Microsoft Windows, Macintosh
- Release: July 24, 2002
- Genre: Edutainment

Blue's Clues Kindergarten is a Windows and Macintosh PC video game distributed on CD-ROM. Based on the television series Blue's Clues, kids can learn different skills that will help them get ready for grade school.

== Plot ==
Periwinkle is nervous about going to school. To help him, Blue and Joe turn Blue's house into a make-believe kindergarten with games about science, math, rhyming, art, and more. Choose from five games with Blue, Joe, and friends, while three adjustable levels of difficulty match children's growth. Play Refrigerator Rhymes in Blue's kitchen, tell time with Tickety, learn math at the Sand Table with Shovel and Pail, and Super Science at Peri's fort.

== Critical reception ==
The game received positive reception from critics, with Edutaining Kids giving the game a B+, Review Corner rating it 8.2 out of 10, Tech with Kids providing a 4/5 star-rating, and KidZone an 7.8 out of 10 score.
