= Atlas Eets Christmas =

2007 album

Studio album by Imagene Peise
- Released: December 15, 2007
- Genres: Christmas music, cool jazz

The Flaming Lips chronology
At War with the Mystics (2006)	Atlas Eets Christmas (2007)	Once Beyond Hopelessness (2008)

Atlas Eets Christmas is the first album of the rock band the Flaming Lips under their alias Imagene Peise. It is an instrumental Christmas music album that was originally released as a limited edition CD in 2007, and was eventually released in vinyl for the 2014 Boxing Day.

== Reception ==
Editors at AllMusic rated this album 3.5 out of 5 stars, with critic Timothy Monger writing "the album plays like the soundtrack to some sort of unearthed educational filmstrip where science meets Santa" and characterizes the release as "a warmly intended yet moon-cold Christmas album that is still surprisingly pleasant". Writing for Sputnikmusic, praise jimmy gave this release a 4.0 out of 5, calling it more reserved than the band's usual psychedelic rock and "going for a more reserved, peaceful sound this time around".

== Track listing ==
Atlas Eets Christmas track listing
No.	Title	Writer(s)	Length
1.	"Winter Wonderland"	Felix Bernard, Richard B. Smith	3:45
2.	"Silver Bells"	Jay Livingston, Ray Evans	2:41
3.	"Christmas Laughing Waltz (including Jingle Bells)"	Steven Drozd, Traditional	4:29
4.	"Silent Night"	Traditional	3:18
5.	"Atlas Eets Christmas"	Wayne Coyne, Steven Drozd	3:08
6.	"Do You Hear What I Hear?"	Gloria Shayne, Noel Regney	4:01
7.	"Have Yourself a Merry Little Christmas"	Hugh Martin, Ralph Blane	3:00
8.	"White Christmas (Binson Echorec Sleigh Ride)"	Irving Berlin	3:19
9.	"Frosty the Snowman"	Steve Nelson, Walter E. Rollins	2:32
10.	"Christmas Kindness Song"	Steven Drozd	3:09
11.	"The Christmas Song"	Mel Tormé, Robert Wells	3:41
Total length:			37:03
