= Blue's Clues & You! =

Television series from Nickelodeon

- Genre: Educational
- Created by: Traci Paige Johnson; Todd Kessler; Angela C. Santomero
- Based on: Blue's Clues
- Developed by: Traci Paige Johnson; Angela C. Santomero
- Presented by: Josh Dela Cruz
- Voices of: Traci Paige Johnson; Doug Murray; Liyou Abere; Shazdeh Kapadia; Skywalker Hughes; Brad Adamson; Nick Balaban; Gisele Rousseau; Shechinah Mpumlwana; Abigail Nicholson; Abigail Oliver; Jaiden Cannatelli; Niko Ceci; Jayd Deroché; Leo Orgil; Nathan Sayavong; Luke Dietz; Jordana Blake; Michela Luci; Ava Augustin; Maja Vujicic; Jacob Soley; Lexi Perri
- Opening theme: "Blue's Clues & You! Theme Song" by Josh Dela Cruz
- Composers: PT Walkley; Michael Rubin (original songs); Nick Balaban (original songs)
- Countries of origin: United States; Canada
- Original language: English
- No. of seasons: 5
- No. of episodes: 90

Production
- Executive producers: Angela C. Santomero; Vince Commisso; Wendy Harris; Traci Paige Johnson; Todd Kessler; Jennifer Twomey
- Production companies: Brown Bag Films; Nickelodeon Animation Studio

Original release
- Network: Nickelodeon (United States, 2019–2023); Nick Jr. (United States, 2023–2024); Treehouse TV (Canada); YouTube (2024)
- Release: November 11, 2019 – September 27, 2024

Related
- Blue's Clues; Blue's Room

Blue's Clues & You! is an interactive educational children's television series developed by Traci Paige Johnson and Angela C. Santomero for Nickelodeon. Combining live-action and animation, it is a revival of the 1996–2006 Blue's Clues television series, which was created by Johnson, Santomero, and Todd Kessler. The revival features a new host, Josh Dela Cruz, and was produced by Nickelodeon Animation Studio in association with Brown Bag Films. It premiered on Nickelodeon on November 11, 2019. On July 17, 2025, Josh Dela Cruz announced that Nickelodeon abruptly canceled the show and that only four episodes of the supposed fifth season were produced. The final season was released on YouTube on September 27, 2024.

== Premise ==
Similar to the 1996–2006 original series, this series has live-action and animation. The series features new production designs, and the characters (aside from the host) are animated digitally, though the visual style remains similar to the style used in the original series.

Like the original show, Blue's Clues & You! depends upon built-in silences designed to encourage audience participation and what The New York Times called "direct address inviting preschoolers to play along with games and solve mini-mysteries". The show's producers factored in the impact of the previous series, and that although young children had more access to technology and were more visual than preschoolers before, they still had the same developmental and emotional needs to "slow down".

== Cast and characters ==
=== Main ===
- Blue (vocal effects by Traci Paige Johnson) – A blue puppy who leaves pawprints on objects (and occasionally characters) as clues to what she wants to do.
- Josh (portrayed by Josh Dela Cruz) – The host of the series. He is a cousin of Steve and Joe from the original series.
- Mailbox (voiced by Doug Murray) – A mailbox who delivers a letter or e-mail to Josh every day.
- Sidetable Drawer (voiced by Liyou Abere in season one, Shazdeh Kapadia from seasons two to four, and Skywalker Hughes in season five) – The keeper of the Handy Dandy Notebook, who lives in the living room.
- Mr. Salt (voiced by Brad Adamson from seasons one to four and Nick Balaban in Blue's Big City Adventure and season five) and Ms. Pepper (voiced by Gisele Rousseau) – A married couple of condiment dispensers who live in the kitchen.
- Paprika (voiced by Shechinah Mpumlwana in season one, Abigail Nicholson in seasons two and three, and Abigail Oliver in seasons four and five) – Mr. Salt and Mrs. Pepper's eldest child. She carries a smartphone made from a graham cracker.
- Cinnamon (voiced by Jaiden Cannatelli in season one, Niko Ceci from seasons two to four, and Jayd Deroché in season five) – A cinnamon shaker who is Paprika's younger brother. He wears a baseball cap.
- Sage and Ginger – Paprika and Cinnamon's 1-year-old youngest brother and sister.
- Shovel (voiced by Leo Orgil from seasons one to three, Nathan Sayavong in season four and Luke Dietz in season five) and Pail (voiced by Jordana Blake from seasons one to three and Michela Luci in seasons four and five) – A brother and sister who live in the backyard.
- Tickety Tock (voiced by Ava Augustin from seasons one to four and Maja Vujicic in season five) – An alarm clock who wakes the residents of the Blue's Clues House each morning.
- Slippery Soap (voiced by Jacob Soley from seasons one to four and Lexi Perri in season five) – A bar of soap who lives in the bathroom sink. He slides around everywhere he goes.

=== Recurring ===
- Magenta (vocal effects by Diane Salema) – A magenta puppy who is Blue's best friend from school.
- Periwinkle (voiced by Luxton Handspiker in season three and Peter Laurie in seasons four and five) – A kitten who made his debut in the third season.
- Rainbow Puppy (voiced by Brianna Bryan) – A rainbow-colored puppy who is Periwinkle's friend from the city.
- Steve (portrayed by Steve Burns) – Josh's cousin and Joe's older brother, a college graduate who works at the Blue Prints Detective Agency (a nod to the title of the pilot for the original series). He was the first host of the original series.
- Joe (portrayed by Donovan Patton) – Josh's other cousin and Steve's younger brother, who works at the Present Store. He was the second host of the original series.
- Lola (portrayed by Carolyn Fe) – Josh's grandmother, originally from the Philippines (lola translates to "grandmother" in Filipino).

== Episodes ==
=== Series overview ===
Season	Episodes		Originally released		
Season	Episodes		First released	Last released	Network
1	17		November 11, 2019	July 14, 2020	Nickelodeon
2	21		August 19, 2020	September 17, 2021	Nickelodeon
3	18		October 1, 2021	October 6, 2022	Nickelodeon
4	30	14	October 20, 2022	September 11, 2023	Nickelodeon
4	30	16	October 9, 2023	February 15, 2024	Nick Jr.
5	4		September 27, 2024		YouTube

=== Season 1 (2019–20) ===
No. overall	No. in season	Title	Directed by	Written by	Original release date	Prod. code	U.S. viewers (millions)
1	1	"Meet Josh!"	M.R. Horhager & Jennifer Sherman	Angela C. Santomero	November 11, 2019 (Note: These episodes were released early to Vudu on September 27, 2019.)	101	0.87
Josh needs to figure out what is missing for snack time and learns how to play Blue's Clues with help from Steve and Joe. Josh, Blue and the viewers also help the Spice Family put groceries away and match chicks on a farm. This episode is a remake of "Blue Prints" and "Snack Time" from the original series.
2	2	"Playdate with Magenta"	Steve Burns & M.R. Horhager	Original script : Alice Wilder & Michael Smith; Edited by : Angela C. Santomero & Becky Friedman Lowitt	November 12, 2019	103	N/A
Josh needs to figure out what Blue wants to do on her playdate with Magenta. Josh, Blue and the viewers also make racecars with Mr. Salt and Mrs. Pepper and help Shovel and Pail follow footprints at the park. This episode is a remake of "Magenta Comes Over" from the original series.
3	3	"Big News with Blue"	Steve Burns & Jennifer Sherman	Original script : Angela C. Santomero; Edited by : Angela C. Santomero & Becky Friedman Lowitt	November 13, 2019	104	0.55
Josh needs to figure out what Blue is trying to tell everyone. Josh, Blue and the viewers also go on a treasure hunt with Shovel and Pail and send a message to Slippery Soap's friend in a chalk world. This episode is a remake of "Blue's News" from the original series.
4	4	"ABC's with Blue"	Steve Wright & M.R. Horhager	Original script : Angela C. Santomero; Edited by : Angela C. Santomero & Becky Friedman Lowitt	November 14, 2019	105	0.59
Josh needs to figure out what book Blue wants to read. Josh, Blue and the viewers also help Mr. Salt and Mrs. Pepper find groceries and fix jumbled sentences in a storybook. This episode is a remake of "Blue's ABCs" from the original series.
5	5	"123's with Blue"	Steve Wright & Jennifer Sherman	Original script : Angela C. Santomero; Edited by : Angela C. Santomero & Becky Friedman Lowitt	November 18, 2019	106	0.53
Josh needs to figure out what book Blue wants to buy. Josh, Blue and the viewers also count graham crackers with Shovel and Pail and shop at Joe's present store. This episode is a remake of "Math" from the original series.
6	6	"Sad Day with Blue"	Steve Wright & M.R. Horhager	Angela C. Santomero	November 19, 2019	107	0.66
Josh needs to figure out why Blue is feeling sad. Josh, Blue and the viewers also identify Fred Felt Friend's emotions and help Blue's friends at school. This episode is a remake of "Blue's Sad Day" from the original series.
7	7	"Laugh with Blue"	Steve Wright & Jennifer Sherman	Original script : Adam Peltzman; Edited by : Angela C. Santomero	November 20, 2019	108	0.49
Josh needs to figure out what will make Blue laugh. Josh, Blue and the viewers also follow a gopher's pattern and see the mixed-up wonders of Silly Town. This episode is a remake of "What's So Funny?" from the original series.
8	8	"Song Time with Blue"	Steve Wright & M.R. Horhager	Original script : Angela C. Santomero; Edited by : Angela C. Santomero & Becky Friedman Lowitt	November 21, 2019	109	0.49
Josh needs to figure out what song Blue wants to sing for song time. Josh, Blue and the viewers also match a mixed-up instrument sound and sing "Row, Row, Row Your Boat" with chicks on a farm. This episode is a remake of "Blue's Favorite Song" from the original series.
9	9	"Getting Glasses with Magenta"	Steve Wright & M.R. Horhager	Original script : Angela C. Santomero; Edited by : Angela C. Santomero & Becky Friedman Lowitt	December 13, 2019	111	0.61
Josh needs to figure out what Magenta can do with her new glasses. Josh, Blue and the viewers also visit the eye doctor with Magenta and convince Magenta to wear her new glasses at the playground. This episode is a remake of "Magenta Gets Glasses" from the original series.
10	10	"Growing with Blue"	Steve Wright & Jennifer Sherman	Original script : Angela C. Santomero; Edited by : Angela C. Santomero & Becky Friedman Lowitt	January 10, 2020	110	0.50
Josh needs to figure out what Blue wants to do outside. Josh, Blue and the viewers also help Mr. Salt and Mrs. Pepper figure out where orange juice comes from and help the Felt Friends figure out where different crops grow. This episode is a remake of "The Grow Show" from the original series.
11	11	"Happy Birthday Blue"	M.R. Horhager & Jennifer Sherman	Original script : Angela C. Santomero; Edited by : Angela C. Santomero & Becky Friedman Lowitt	February 7, 2020	102	0.77
Josh needs to figure out what birthday present Blue wants. Josh and the viewers also do a bit of decorating for Blue's birthday party, shop at Joe's present store and watch Blue open presents. This episode is a remake of "Blue's Birthday" from the original series.
12	12	"Story Time with Blue"	Steve Wright & M.R. Horhager	Original script : Angela C. Santomero; Edited by : Angela C. Santomero & Becky Friedman Lowitt	March 6, 2020	113	0.49
13	13	"The Thinking Squad"	Steve Wright & Jennifer Sherman	Original script : Adam Peltzman & Michael T. Smith; Edited by : Alyson Piekarsky	April 3, 2020	116	0.58
14	14	"Science with Blue"	Jeremy Slutskin & Jennifer Sherman	Original script : Angela C. Santomero; Edited by : Angela C. Santomero & Becky Friedman Lowitt	May 5, 2020	112	0.51
15	15	"Colors Everywhere with Blue"	M.R. Horhager	Original script : Jennifer Twomey; Edited by : Angela C. Santomero	June 2, 2020	117	0.52
16	16	"Pajama Party with Blue"	Steve Wright & Jennifer Sherman	Original script : Adam Peltzman; Edited by : Angela C. Santomero & Becky Friedman Lowitt	June 16, 2020	118	0.56
17	17	"Bluestock" "Blue's Sing-Along Spectacular"	Jeremy Slutskin & M.R. Horhager	Original script : Sascha Paladino; Edited by : Angela C. Santomero	July 14, 2020	115	0.45

=== Season 2 (2020–21) ===
No. overall	No. in season	Title	Directed by	Written by	Original release date	Prod. code	U.S. viewers (millions)
18	1	"Blue's Big Beat Band"	Jeremy Slutskin & Jennifer Sherman	Jorge Aguirre	August 19, 2020	201	0.42
19	2	"Hide and Seek with Blue"	Steve Wright & M.R. Horhager	Pammy Salmon	September 16, 2020	202	0.50
20	3	"Blue's Treasure Hunt"	Steve Wright & Jennifer Sherman	Alyson Piekarsky	September 30, 2020	203	0.48
21	4	"Spooky Costume Party with Blue"	Steve Wright & M.R. Horhager	Original script : Alice Wilder & Michael Smith; Edited by : Angela C. Santomero & Becky Friedman Lowitt	October 16, 2020 (Note: This episode was first released in Fantastic Fall DVD on September 22, 2020.)	119	0.50
22	5	"Thankful with Blue"	Steve Wright & Jennifer Sherman	Original script : Jennifer Brackenbury & Angela C. Santomero; Edited by : Angela C. Santomero & Becky Friedman Lowitt	November 6, 2020	120	0.59
23	6	"Welcome to Blue's Bistro"	Steve Burns & M.R. Horhager	Steve Burns	November 13, 2020	206	0.43
24	7	"Blue's Big Baking Show"	Jeremy Slutskin & M.R. Horhager	Jorge Aguirre	November 20, 2020	204	0.40
25	8	"Blue's Night Before Christmas"	Steve Burns & M.R. Horhager	Steve Burns	December 4, 2020	208	0.52
26	9	"Sleepy Singalong with Blue"	Jeremy Slutskin & Jennifer Sherman	Mary Jacobson	December 18, 2020	207	0.49
27	10	"Blue's Big Dance Party"	Steve Wright & Jennifer Sherman	Pammy Salmon	January 1, 2021	205	0.45
28	11	"Blue's Big Imagination"	Donovan Patton & Jennifer Sherman	Angela C. Santomero	January 22, 2021	209	0.44
29	12	"What I Like About Blue"	Steve Wright & M.R. Horhager	Pammy Salmon	February 12, 2021	214	0.31
30	13	"Blue's Show and Tell Surprise"	Steve Wright & Jennifer Sherman	Caitlin Hodson	March 5, 2021	213	0.38
31	14	"Blue's Rainy Day Rainbow"	Steve Wright & Jennifer Sherman	Caitlin Hodson	March 12, 2021	211	0.40
32	15	"Spring is Here!"	Steve Wright & Jennifer Sherman	Alyson Piekarsky	April 23, 2021	217	0.34
33	16	"Blue's Big Neighborhood Adventure"	Steve Wright & Jennifer Sherman	Jorge Aguirre	May 21, 2021	215	0.34
34	17	"Blue's Beach Bonanza"	Steve Burns & Jennifer Sherman	Steve Burns	June 4, 2021	219	0.40
35	18	"Blue's Anywhere Box Surprise"	Steve Wright & M.R. Horhager	Jorge Aguirre	June 25, 2021	212	0.42
36	19	"Mystery of the Missing Pies"	Steve Wright & M.R. Horhager	Jill Cozza-Turner	July 2, 2021	220	0.32
37	20	"Blue Makes a Movie with YOU!"	Steve Wright & M.R. Horhager	Caitlin Hodson	August 20, 2021	218	0.32
38	21	"It's YOUR Birthday!"	Steve Wright & M.R. Horhager	Pammy Salmon	September 17, 2021	216	0.31

=== Season 3 (2021–22) ===
No. overall	No. in season	Title	Directed by	Written by	Original release date	Prod. code	U.S. viewers (millions)
39	1	"Our New Neighbor!"	Jeremy Slutskin & Jennifer Sherman	Kevin Del Aguila	October 1, 2021	301	0.17
40	2	"The Ghost of the Living Room"	Alyson Court & M.R. Horhager	Steve Burns	October 18, 2021	304	0.29
41	3	"Blue's Big Costume Parade"	Steve Wright & M.R. Horhager	Alyson Piekarsky	October 29, 2021	210	0.28
42	4	"A Blue's Clues Festival of Lights"	Steve Wright & M.R. Horhager	Alyson Piekarsky	November 26, 2021	306	0.29
43	5	"Blue's Snowy Day Surprise"	Steve Wright & Jennifer Sherman	Caitlin Hodson	December 6, 2021	307	0.31
44	6	"Blue's Dino Clues"	Donovan Patton & M.R. Horhager	Alyson Piekarsky	January 14, 2022	302	0.29
45	7	"Building with Blue"	Alyson Court & Jennifer Sherman	Kevin Del Aguila	February 4, 2022	305	0.34
46	8	"Blue's Backyard Sports Spectacular"	Steve Wright & M.R. Horhager	Alyson Piekarsky	February 8, 2022	308	0.22
47	9	"Blue's Mystery Present"	Jeremy Slutskin & Jennifer Sherman	Caitlin Hodson	March 18, 2022	303	0.28
48	10	"Mailtime Mystery"	Steve Wright & Jennifer Sherman	Kevin Del Aguila	March 18, 2022	309	0.28
49	11	"Magenta's Case of the Giggles"	Nicole Stamp & Jennifer Sherman	Kevin Del Aguila	April 1, 2022	315	0.28
50	12	"Rainbow Puppy's Skidoo Adventure"	Jeremy Slutskin & M.R. Horhager	Alyson Piekarsky	May 13, 2022	318	0.18
51	13	"Blue's Treasure of Clue Lagoon"	Jeremy Slutskin & Jennifer Sherman	Caitlin Hodson	June 22, 2022	319	0.33
52	14	"Blue and Little Rainbow Riding Hood"	Jeremy Slutskin & M.R. Horhager	Kevin Del Aguila	August 5, 2022	320	0.18
53	15	"Blue's Storytime with Camila"	Steve Wright & M.R. Horhager	Steve Burns	October 3, 2022	310	0.18
54	16	"Tickety's Big Musical Morning"	Steve Wright & Jennifer Sherman	Caitlin Hodson	October 4, 2022	311	0.22
55	17	"Something New at Blue's School"	Steve Wright & M.R. Horhager	Kevin Del Aguila	October 5, 2022	312	0.26
56	18	"Feelin' Filipino"	M.R. Horhager	Billy Lopez	October 6, 2022	316	0.20

=== Season 4 (2022–24) ===
No. overall	No. in season	Title	Directed by	Written by	Original release date	Prod. code	U.S. viewers (millions)
Nickelodeon
57	1	"The Legend of the Jack O'Lantern"	Steve Wright & Jennifer Sherman	Caitlin Hodson	October 20, 2022	402	0.18
58	2	"Into the Blueniverse!"	Jeremy Slutskin & Jennifer Sherman	Caitlin Hodson	November 7, 2022	317	0.20
59	3	"Sage & Ginger's Baby Book"	Steve Wright & Jennifer Sherman	Alyson Piekarsky	November 8, 2022	313	0.24
60	4	"Joshini the Amazing"	Steve Wright & M.R. Horhager	Steve Burns	November 9, 2022 (Note: This episode was first released in Rainbow Puppy Adventures DVD on October 4, 2022.)	314	0.23
61	5	"Getting Healthy with Blue"	Steve Wright & Jennifer Sherman	Original script : Angela C. Santomero; Edited by : Angela C. Santomero & Becky Friedman Lowitt	November 10, 2022 (Note: This episode was first released in Caring with Blue DVD on October 6, 2020.)	114	0.22
62	6	"A Blue Christmas with You!"	Steve Wright & M.R. Horhager	Kevin Del Aguila	November 29, 2022	406	0.17
63	7	"Blue's Wish Comes True!"	Steve Wright & Jennifer Sherman	Kevin Del Aguila	February 3, 2023	401	0.18
64	8	"Thank You Day"	Alyson Court & M.R. Horhager	Darnell Lamont Walker	February 10, 2023	404	0.12
65	9	"Firefighter Blue to the Rescue!"	Steve Wright & Jennifer Sherman	Alyson Piekarsky	March 3, 2023	403	0.20
66	10	"Knights of the Snack Table"	Kevin Del Aguila & M.R. Horhager	Steve Burns	May 5, 2023	405	0.13
67	11	"Night at the Blueseum"	Nicole Stamp & Jennifer Sherman	Caitlin Hodson & Donovan Patton	May 12, 2023	407	0.12
68	12	"A Tale of Shovel & Pail"	M.R. Horhager	Caitlin Hodson	May 19, 2023	408	0.14
69	13	"The Case of the Missing Thinking Chair"	Steve Burns & Jennifer Sherman	Steve Burns	May 26, 2023	411	0.16
70	14	"Return of the Thinking Squad"	Steve Wright & Jennifer Sherman	Caitlin Hodson & Donovan Patton	September 11, 2023	417	0.08
Nick Jr.
71	15	"Rainbow Puppy's Big Farm Fair" "A Blue-Ribbon Prize"	Nicole Stamp & Jennifer Sherman	Alyson Piekarsky	October 9, 2023	409	0.11
72	16	"Pearl's Kickball Championship"	Donovan Patton & M.R. Horhager	Kevin Del Aguila	October 10, 2023	410	0.07
73	17	"The Big Blue Derby"	Steve Wright & M.R. Horhager	Alyson Piekarsky	October 11, 2023	412	N/A
74	18	"Blue's New Pet"	Steve Wright & Jennifer Sherman	Kevin Del Aguila	October 12, 2023	413	0.14
75	19	"The Wizard of Skidoo"	Steve Wright & M.R. Horhager	Caitlin Hodson	October 16, 2023	414	0.08
76	20	"Josh's Crummy Day"	Alyson Court & Jennifer Sherman	Kevin Del Aguila	October 17, 2023	415	0.09
77	21	"Josh and Blue's Ice Cream Shoppe"	M.R. Horhager	Alyson Piekarsky	October 18, 2023	416	N/A
78	22	"The Smelly Smell"	Steve Wright & M.R. Horhager	Caitlin Hodson	October 19, 2023	418	N/A
79	23	"Rock On, Rainbow Puppy!"	Steve Wright & M.R. Horhager	Alyson Piekarsky	October 23, 2023	420	N/A
80	24	"¡Hola, Mexico City!"	Steve Wright & Jennifer Sherman	Kevin Del Aguila	October 24, 2023	421	0.10
81	25	"Josh Visits the Philippines!" "Kamusta, Philippines!"	M.R. Horhager	Emman Sadorra & Caitlin Hodson	October 25, 2023	422	N/A
82	26	"Happy Birthday, Sage & Ginger"	Steve Wright & Jennifer Sherman	Darnell Lamont Walker	October 26, 2023	419	N/A
83	27	"If You Don't See It, Be It!"	Steve Wright & M.R. Horhager	Kevin Del Aguila	February 12, 2024	426	0.08
84	28	"Hotel Blue"	Alyson Court & Jennifer Sherman	Alyson Piekarsky	February 13, 2024	423	N/A
85	29	"Blue's Breaking News"	Alyson Court & M.R. Horhager	Steve Burns	February 14, 2024	424	0.09
86	30	"Blue's Countdown Celebration"	Steve Wright & Jennifer Sherman	Caitlin Hodson	February 15, 2024	425	0.08

=== Season 5 (2024) ===
No. overall	No. in season	Title	Directed by	Written by	Original release date	Prod. code
87	1	"Blue Goes Green"	Steve Wright & Jennifer Sherman	Caitlin Hodson	September 27, 2024	TBA
88	2	"Welcome to Camp Clue"	Steve Wright & Jennifer Sherman	Caitlin Hodson & Ava X. Rigelhaupt	September 27, 2024	TBA
89	3	"Camp Clue Hits the Trail"	M.R. Horhager	Alyson Piekarsky	September 27, 2024	TBA
90	4	"Blue's Big Backyard Carnival Prize"	Steve Wright & M.R. Horhager	Alyson Piekarsky	September 27, 2024	TBA

== Production ==
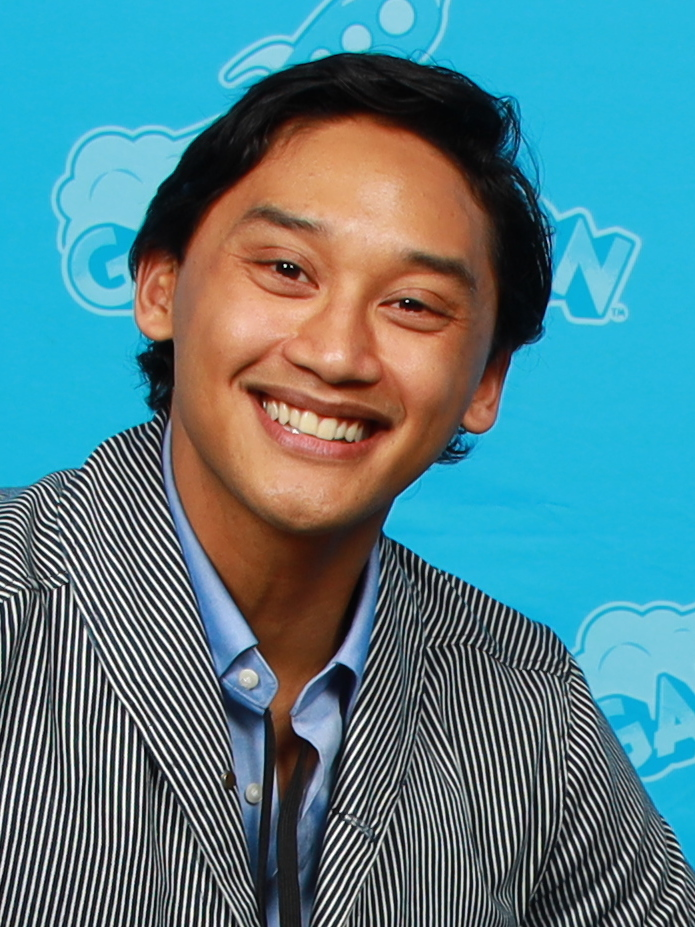
Josh Dela Cruz, the host of the series

In 2017, the show's original creators, Angela C. Santomero and Traci Paige Johnson, after many years of trying to bring Blue's Clues back to Nickelodeon, were given permission to develop a reboot for 20 episodes.

On April 17, 2018, Nickelodeon posted a video discussing the audition process for the revival. Over a thousand people participated in the auditions.

On September 13, 2018, Nickelodeon announced that Josh Dela Cruz, best known as an understudy for Disney's Aladdin on Broadway for five years, would be the series' new host. Dela Cruz, who grew up in New Jersey, watched the original run of the show with his younger sister and is the only Asian-American to host Blue's Clues. Traci Paige Johnson, who co-created the series and voiced Blue, reprises the role in the revival. Steve Burns, the first host of the series, participated in the casting process.

9 Story Media Group's live-action and animation division co-produces the series with animators from Brown Bag Films. The animators updated the show with objects familiar to preschoolers of the modern age; for example, the handy dandy notebook doubles as a smartphone and emails arrive during mail time. The series is being filmed in 9 Story's Toronto studio.

On May 27, 2019, a first-look trailer was released to the public. On August 2, an extended version of the theme song was released.

On August 26, 2019, it was announced that the series would premiere on November 11, and that the show's two original hosts, Burns and Donovan Patton, would be returning to portray their respective characters in the series premiere episode. The New York Times reported that Burns was at first reluctant to continue his association with the show, but was persuaded by its fans on social media to write, direct, and appear on the show.

On November 19, 2019, the series was renewed for a second season of 20 episodes. The series was later renewed for a third season of 20 episodes on February 19, 2020, a fourth season of 26 episodes on February 18, 2021, and a fifth season of 26 episodes on March 24, 2022. On July 17, 2025, however, Josh Dela Cruz confirmed on Instagram that only four episodes of the fifth season were produced, and that Nickelodeon abruptly canceled the show.

== Release ==
The series premiered on Nickelodeon on November 11, 2019. Three episodes were made available to stream for free on Vudu on September 27, ahead of the official release on Nickelodeon. In Canada, the series premiered on Treehouse TV on the same day as the U.S. date.

On March 28, 2024, the series was removed from Paramount+ as part of a "strategic decision to focus on content with mass global appeal".

== Awards and nominations ==
Year	Award	Category	Result	Ref.
2020	47th Daytime Emmy Awards	Outstanding Preschool Children's Series	Nominated	
2020	47th Daytime Emmy Awards	Outstanding Interactive Media for a Daytime Program	Nominated	
2020	Cynopsis Best of the Best Awards	Best Preschool Series	Nominated	
2021	Kidscreen Awards	Best Mixed-Media Series	Nominated	
2021	48th Daytime Emmy Awards	Outstanding Writing Team for a Preschool, Children's or Family Viewing Program	Nominated	
2021	48th Daytime Emmy Awards	Outstanding Directing Team for a Preschool, Children's or Family Viewing Program	Nominated	
2021	4th Annual Gay Emmys	Outstanding Animated Series	Nominated	
2023	2nd Children's and Family Emmy Awards	Outstanding Preschool Series	Nominated	
2024	4th Astra TV Awards	Best Children or Family Series	Nominated	
2025	3rd Children's and Family Emmy Awards	Outstanding Preschool Series	Won	

== Other media ==
=== Film ===
On July 12, 2021, it was revealed that an animated movie for the series would be made, marking the 25th anniversary of the franchise. In the film, Josh and Blue attempt to audition for a Broadway musical. Directed by Matt Stawski and written by Angela Santomero and Liz Maccie, the film began production in summer 2021. On February 15, 2022, the title was revealed as Blue's Big City Adventure. The film was released on Paramount+ on November 18, 2022.

=== Merchandising ===
In July 2019, Nickelodeon & Viacom Consumer Products announced that Just Play, a Florida toy company, would produce plush, figurines, playsets, and roleplay merchandise based on the series, while VTech, a Hong Kong company, would produce "early learning toys with modern tech features". Cardinal, a New York-based company, manages games and puzzles. The products became available for purchase in fall 2020.

=== Tour ===
On March 8, 2022, a touring production titled Blue's Clues & You! Live on Stage was announced. The tour, which ran from September 24, 2022, to February 11, 2023, traveled across the United States.
