= Songs for Dustmites =

Studio album by Steve Burns
- Released: August 12, 2003
- Recorded: 2002
- Studios: Tarbox Road Studios (Cassadaga, New York); various other studios in New York
- Genres: Noise pop; indie rock; alternative rock; shoegaze
- Length: 45:44
- Label: PIAS
- Producers: Dave Fridmann; Ed Buller

Steve Burns chronology
Songs for Dustmites (2003)	Deep Sea Recovery Efforts (2009)

Songs for Dustmites is the debut studio album by American musician, actor, and television host Steve Burns. It was released on August 12, 2003, through PIAS America. The album was produced by Dave Fridmann and Ed Buller.

After quitting Blue's Clues, Burns described himself as being "in a position where I could do what I wanted". He decided to collaborate with Fridmann and members of the Flaming Lips, a band who had previously worked with Fridmann. After receiving multiple offers from various record labels, Burns signed with PIAS. Songs for Dustmites is a pop/rock or indie rock album, and its lyrics are mostly about "science and love". The album received positive reviews from music critics, although some of them attributed its success more to Burns's collaborators.

The track "Mighty Little Man" is used as the theme song for the CBS television series Young Sheldon.

== Background and recording ==
Before acting in Blue's Clues, Burns had been in many high-school and college bands. When he left the show in 2002 after working there for six years, he "found [himself] in a position where [he] could do what [he] wanted," and he decided to become a musician. He worked on demos, rehearsing the songs over and over again, scared to show them to anyone. Burns began recording the album once he purchased a computer that could record and edit sounds. He recorded it in a trial-and-error way, until he believed it sounded right. Burns started making Songs for Dustmites after he "was obsessed with a picture someone had shown [him] of a dustmite fighting with a micro gear."

Burns later sent producer Dave Fridmann an e-mail introducing himself and sent the demos the day after Fridmann's son had a Blue's Clues-themed birthday party. Fridmann liked the demos, so he sent Burns to Tarbox Road Studios near Fredonia, New York, where they worked with Flaming Lips member Steven Drozd. Mac Randall of The New York Observer hypothesized that the band decided to work with Burns because it was "too off-the-wall to resist." Burns stated of recording with members of the Flaming Lips that "There were definitely moments when I would run into the next room so I could giggle maniacally, jump up and down and clap my hands," calling the experience "a dream come true." According to Burns, "he and Fridmann gave [him] a lot of help in understanding the studio process, how it all works, how to take a musical idea and shine it up into a song." Ed Buller wrote to Burns, "sort of in disbelief." Burns suspects that Buller searched the internet for Burns and downloaded his songs, "expecting to make fun of [him]," and was surprised that the music was not bad. Burns also met and worked with Mike Rubin from Murmur Music, saying that "some of the best work on the album came out of that relationship." Burns received numerous offers from various record labels mostly due to him making an album being a "ridiculous story." He chose to sign with PIAS Recordings after talking with Kevin Wortis of the label, saying he "was the first one who sat me down and said, 'This makes sense. I don't know why, but there is a thread of logic between Blue's Clues, the Flaming Lips and your record'."

== Composition ==
"Mighty Little Man"
Opening track "Mighty Little Man" was written as a "positive, empowering, exclamation point of a song".

Lyrically, Songs for Dustmites deals with "familiar themes of love and loss", while Burns himself has described the album as "songs about science and love". Musically, the album fits into the pop/rock and alternative rock genres, and is heavily influenced by the Flaming Lips. The lyrics of the opening track "Mighty Little Man" have been interpreted in different ways: a television watcher who suddenly turns into "an everyday superhero", or "a lonely inventor's eureka moment". It was inspired by inventor Thomas Edison and his "DIY projects that changed human history". When Burns made the song, he wanted to "write a positive, empowering, exclamation point of a song". The song itself contains a "fury of noise". The following track, "What I Do on Saturday", is a "playful" pop song, while "Maintain" is a more mainstream song influenced by American alternative band They Might Be Giants. The song "Troposphere" is "bright and bouncy", sounding like the Flaming Lips song "Fight Test". The ballad "A Song for Dustmites" contains piano and synths. The next track, "Stick Around", is melancholic and sounds optimistic with its cello and trumpet. ">1" is a "simple" downtempo song that tells the story of a dysfunctional relationship. It features strings and a guitar solo.

== Reception ==
Professional ratings
Review scores
Source	Rating
AllMusic	3.5/5 stars
Pitchfork	(7.8/10)
PopMatters	(favorable)

Songs for Dustmites received positive reviews from music critics; most of them were surprised that an album made by the former Blue's Clues host would be any good. Heather Phares of AllMusic called the album "a promising debut", writing it was "a good-natured collection of atmospheric pop that takes a few chances now and then." She gave the album three and a half stars out of five. Pitchfork gave it a 7.8/10 and complimented Burns' "lyrical insight and gift for writing and arranging endlessly listenable pop songs". The album as a whole was described as managing "to remain true to Burns' legacy as a nice-guy kid's show host despite having made an unabashedly adult record that deals with familiar themes of love and loss". Brian Houston of PopMatters wrote that "Songs for Dustmites is a successful album, but the caveat will always be that the reason for the success lies with the Lips contributions and not with Burns' talent or vision".

== Track listing ==
All tracks are written by Steve Burns.

No.	Title	Length
1.	"Mighty Little Man" (featuring Steven Drozd)	4:13
2.	"What I Do on Saturday" (featuring Steven Drozd)	3:25
3.	"Maintain" (featuring Steven Drozd)	3:16
4.	">1"	2:51
5.	"Troposphere" (featuring Steven Drozd)	4:49
6.	"Stick Around"	4:51
7.	"A Reason"	2:45
8.	"Music for Montgomery County, PA" (instrumental)	1:04
9.	"A Song for Dustmites" (featuring Steven Drozd)	4:55
10.	"Superstrings"	4:32
11.	"A Sniveling Mess"	4:06
12.	"Henry Krinkle's Lament" (featuring Steven Drozd)	4:54

== Personnel ==
Credits are adapted from the album's liner notes.

- Steve Burns – lead vocals, guitar (1–7, 9–12); harmonica (1, 3, 4), thinking chair (4); effects (5, 6, 11), tone generator (7), Rhodes piano (8), space oscillator (8, 9, 11)
- Steven Drozd – keyboards, drums (1–3, 5, 9); guitar (1, 5, 12), backing vocals (2, 3, 9), bass (5), piano (9, 12), Hammond organ (12)
- Dave Fridmann – bass (1)
- Ed Buller – keyboards (2, 3)
- Mary Gavazzi Fridmann – magic porpoise voice (5, 9)
- Michael Rubin – baritone guitar (6, 11, 12), keyboards (6, 10–12), trumpet and string arrangements (6)
- Jim O'Connor – trumpet, piccolo trumpet (6)
- Dorothy Lawson – cello (6)
- Ralph Farris – viola (6)
- Conrad Korsch – bass (10)
- Bernard Devlin – drums (10–12)
- Jim Whitney – bass (11, 12)
- Michael Gentile – flute (12)
- Peter Robbins – tambourine (12)
