= Blue's Clues (video game series) =

Educational adventure video game series based on TV show by Nickelodeon

Several video games based upon Blue's Clues, a children's educational television series by Nickelodeon, have been released, educational video games and web browser games based on the show. Most of the PC CD ROM-format titles were developed and published by Humongous Entertainment.

== List of games ==
=== PC CD-rom games ===
- Blue's Birthday Adventure (September 8, 1998)
- Blue's ABC Time Activities (September 1, 1998)
- Blue's 123 Time Activities (May 11, 1999)
- Blue's Treasure Hunt (September 7, 1999)
- Blue's Art Time Activities (August 22, 2000)
- Blue's Reading Time Activities (August 22, 2000)
- Blue's Clues Preschool (August 20, 2002)
- Blue's Clues Kindergarten (October 17, 2002)
- Blue Takes You to School (August 11, 2003)
- Blue's Room: Blue Talks (August 12, 2004)

=== Home console and handheld console games ===
- Blue's Big Musical (2001, PlayStation)
- Blue's Alphabet Book (2001, Game Boy Color)
- Blue's Clues: Blue's Collection Day (2006, V.Smile)

=== Online web browser games ===
- Blue's Clues:
  - Joe's 3D Scavenger Hunt
  - Dot to Dot
  - You Take Blue to School
  - Ghost Hunt
  - Doodle Doodle Guess & Draw
  - Blue's Gold Clues Challenge
  - Color with Blue
  - Blue's Mix 'n Match Dress-Up
  - Joe's Scrapbook Journey
  - Blue's Puppy Maker
  - Polka Dot's Bubble Puzzle
  - Periwinkle's Disappearo
  - Blue's Music Maker
  - Blue's Matching
  - Blue's Birthday Party Dress-Up
  - Blue's Checkup
  - Where Do Slippers Sleep?
  - Goodnight Bird
  - Blue Is My Name
  - What's in the Box?
  - Blue Answers Your Questions
  - Do the Blue
- Blue's Clues & You!:
  - A Day with Blue
  - Flip and Match
  - World Cooking
  - Wordlinks

A series of Shockwave-formatted minigames directly based on scenes from the original series were also produced

- Do You See My Friend?
- Put Tickety Back Together
- Sorting Pictures With Blue and Steve
- Sorting Clothes
- Instrument Sound Matching!
- Paint Blue's Wagon
- Clouds - Use Your Imagination!
- Matching Snowflakes
- Jigsaw Puzzles
- Picture Frame Patterns
- Fairy Tale Matching
- Letter "P" Word Play
- Shadow Matching
- Felt Friends Dress-Up
- Picture Riddles
- Healthy Snacks
- The Popsicle Stick Project
- Lights On Lights Off!
- Sink and Float
- Recycle!
- Let's Dream!
- Blue's ABCs
- Counting with Cash Register
- Blue's Birthday!
- Water Xylophone!
- Race Against Time
- Lost and Found
- Feelings
- Felt Friend Tic-Tac-Toe
- Kaleidoscope Pictures!
- What Does Paprika Need?
- Teeter-Totter
- Blowing Matching Bubbles!
- Racing Cars!
- Art Appreciation!
- Weight and Balance!
- What's That Sound?
- Hide-and-Seek!
- Blue's Treasure Hunt!
- Concentration
- Blue's Pajama Party
- Holiday Quilt
- Let's Draw!
- Thankful
- Signs

== Commercial performance ==
Business Wire called Blue's ABC Time Activities "one of the most anticipated kids software debuts in recent memory". Together, Blue's Birthday Adventure and Blue's ABC Time Activities sold-through over 150,000 units in their first month of release, and were the second and third best selling educational titles. The two titles became the No. 1 and No. 4 selling educational CD-ROM titles of 1998, respectively. ABC was the fourth best-selling video game title in the week before January 3, 1999, after Barbie Photo Designer, Tomb Raider III, and Fallout 2, and became the third best-selling title out of all PC games in the third quarter and nine months, ending on December 31, 1998. PC Data, which generated the sales data, commented that the popularity of the Blue Clue's CD-ROMs was evident from the impressive sales numbers it consistently generated.

== Critical reception ==
=== Blue's 123 Time Activities ===
The game was the winner of the 1999/2000 BESSIE Award for Math.

=== Blue's ABC Time Activities ===
SuperKids deemed it "pleasant" and said it would appeal to fans of the TV show. Review Corner said the educational value was "excellent", while noting it was "entertaining and appealing for preschoolers". Allgame deemed it a "very good package". PC Data reported that Blue's ABC Time Activities was the United States' best-selling educational software during 1998.

=== Blue's Art Time Activities ===
Tech With Kids said the game wasn't as intuitive as previous titles. Entertaining Kids thought a negative of the game was inability to provide a "good freeform art activity".

=== Blue's Reading Time Activities ===
Tech With Kids wrote that the game was special because it taught word awareness, not simply the alphabet or letter sounds. Discovery School opined the title was well-designed and entertaining. Edutaining Kids thought the game was "clever". Just Adventure gave the game an "A". Daily News commented the game saw the host "gently walking players through graphically simple but engaging activities". Allgame thought that "normally, the Blue's Clues series of games are excellent", but found various technical difficulties with this title.
