= Fisherman =

Person who captures fish and sells or trades it

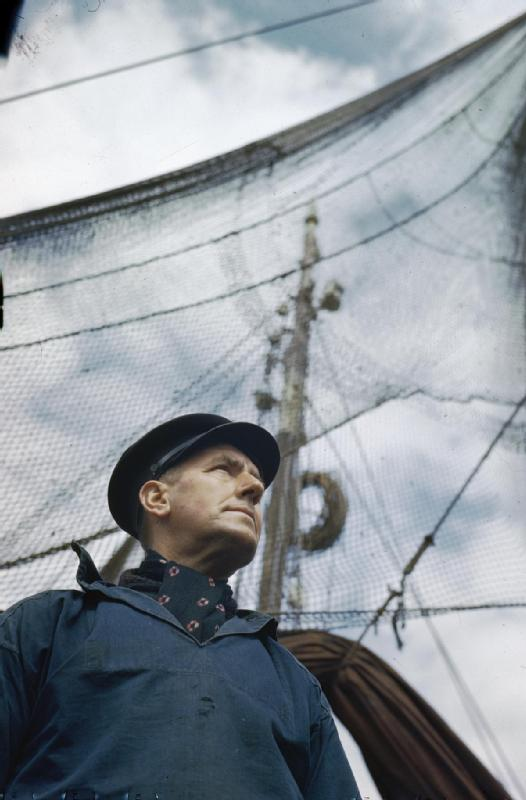
- A Belgian fisherman in the British Fishing Village of Brixham, Devon in 1944

Occupation
- Names: Fish-harvester
- Occupation type: Employment, self-employed
- Activity sectors: Commercial

Description
- Related jobs: fish farmers

A fisherman or fisher is someone who captures fish and other animals from a body of water, or gathers shellfish.

Worldwide, there are about 38 million commercial and subsistence fishers and fish farmers. Fishermen may be professional or recreational. Fishing has existed as a means of obtaining food since the Mesolithic period.

== History ==
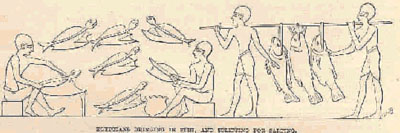
Egyptians bringing in fish and splitting them for salting

Fishing has existed as a means of obtaining food since the Mesolithic period. Fishing had become a major means of survival as well as a business venture.

Fishing and fishermen have also influenced Ancient Egyptian religion; mullets were worshipped as a sign of the arriving flood season. Bastet was often manifested in the form of a catfish. In ancient Egyptian literature, the process that Amun used to create the world is associated with the tilapia's method of mouth-brooding.

== Commerce ==
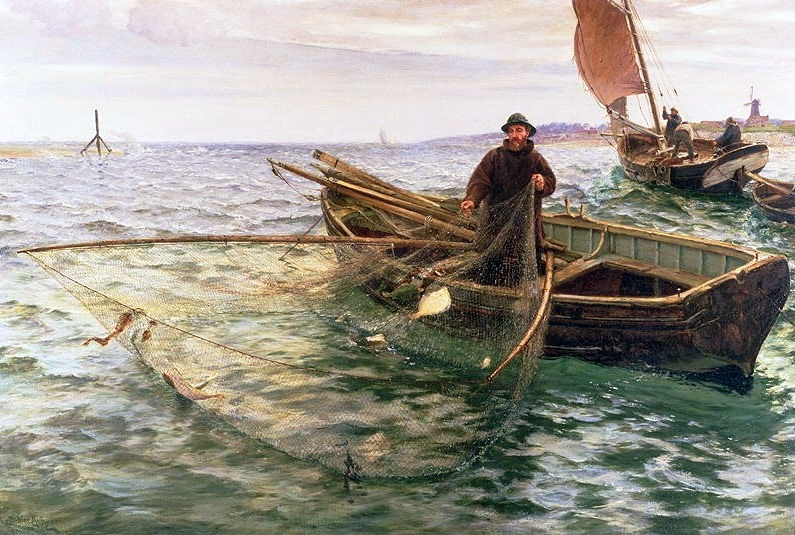
The fisherman – by Charles Napier Hemy, 1888

According to the FAO, there were about 39 million fishermen in countries producing more than 200,000 tonnes in 2012,

which is nearly 140% the number in 1995. The total fishery production of 66 million tonnes equated to an average productivity of 3.5 tonnes per person.

Most of this growth took place in Asian countries, where four-fifths of world fishermen and fish farmers dwell.

Most fishermen are involved in offshore and deep-sea fisheries. Women and men fish in some regions inshore from small boats or collect shellfish and seaweed. In many artisanal fishing communities, women and men are responsible for making and repairing nets, post-harvest processing and marketing.

== Recreation ==
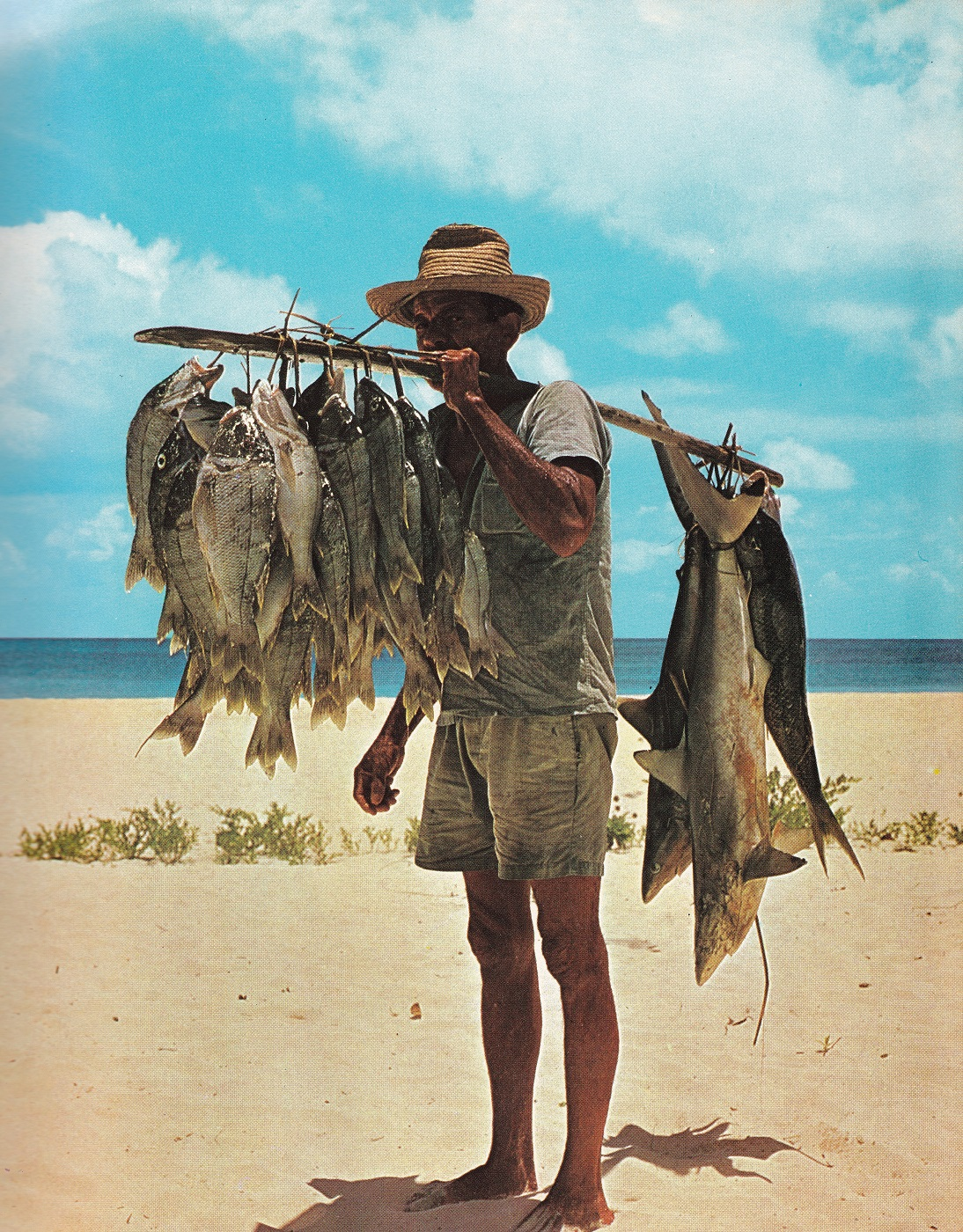
A fisherman and his catch, including small sharks, hooked on hand lines miles offshore in the Seychelles

Recreational fishing is fishing for pleasure or competition. It can be contrasted with commercial fishing, which is fishing for economic profit, or subsistence fishing, which is fishing for survival.

The most common form of recreational fishing is done with a rod, reel, line, hooks and any one of a wide range of baits. Lures are frequently used in place of bait. Some people make handmade lures, including plastic lures and artificial flies.

The practice of catching or attempting to catch fish with a hook is called angling, and fishers using this technique are sometimes referred to as anglers. When angling, it is sometimes expected or required that the fish be caught and released. Big-game fishing is fishing from boats to catch large open-water species such as tuna, sharks and marlin. Noodling and trout tickling are also recreational activities.

== Communities ==
For some communities, fishing provides not only a source of food and work but also community and cultural identity.

== Safety issues ==
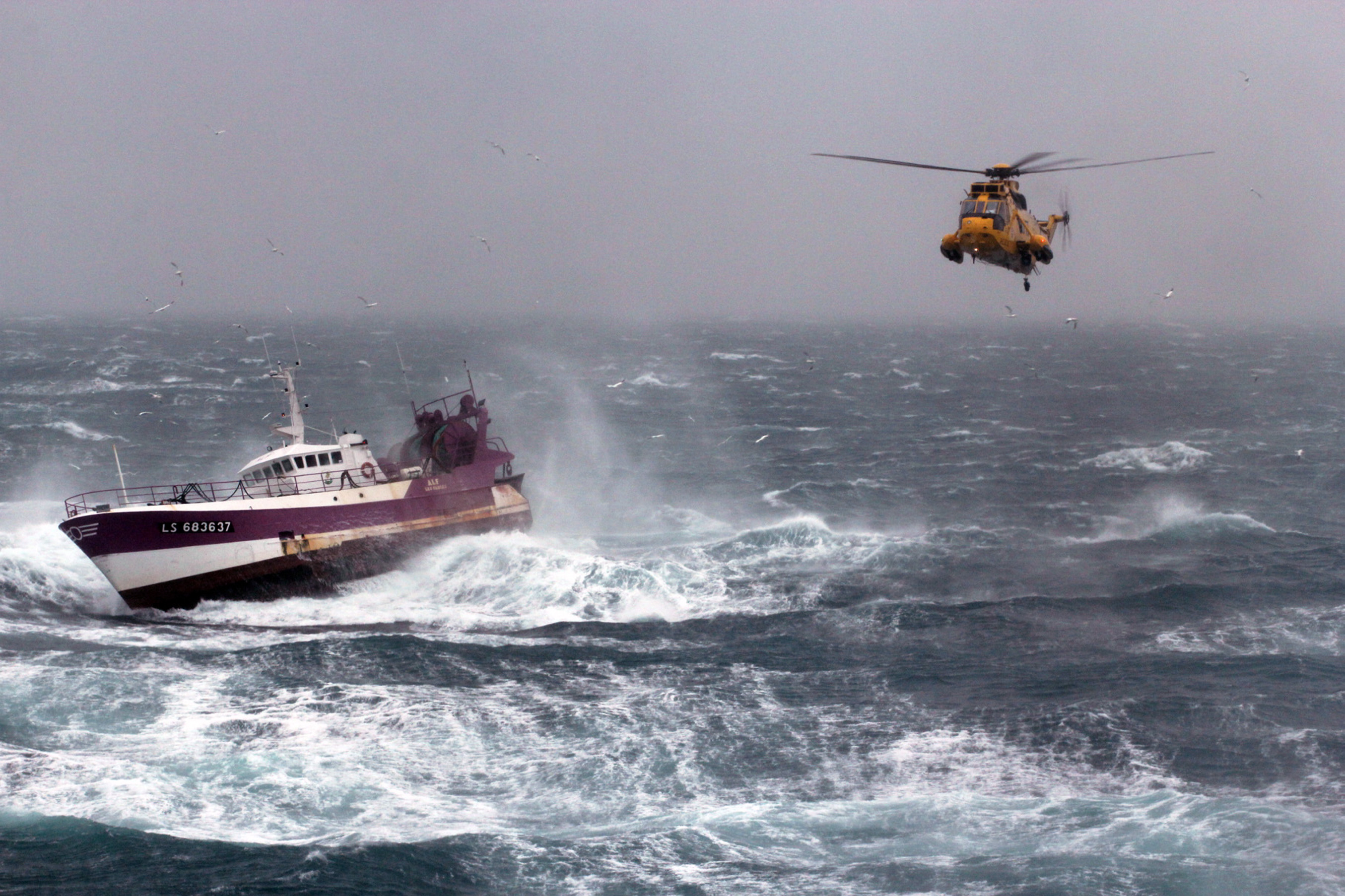
A Royal Air Force search and rescue Sea King helicopter comes to the aid of the French fishing vessel Alf during a storm in the Irish Sea.

The fishing industry is hazardous for Artisan fishers. Between 1992 and 1999, US commercial fishing vessels averaged 78 deaths per year. The main contributors to fatalities are:

- inadequate preparation for emergencies
- poor vessel maintenance and inadequate safety equipment
- lack of awareness of or ignoring stability issues.

Many fishermen, while accepting that fishing is dangerous, staunchly defend their independence. Many proposed laws and additional regulation to increase safety have been defeated because fishers oppose them.

=== Alaska ===
Alaska's commercial fishermen work in one of the world's harshest environments. The hardships they endure include isolated fishing grounds, high winds, seasonal darkness, very cold water, icing, and short fishing seasons, when very long work days are the norm. Fatigue, physical stress, and financial pressures face most Alaska fishermen through their careers. Out of 948 work-related deaths in Alaska during 1990–2006, one-third (311) were of fishermen. This is estimated to be equivalent to an annual fatality rate of 128 per 100,000 workers/year. This fatality rate is 26 times the overall U.S. work-related fatality rate of about 5 per 100,000 workers/year for the same time period.

While the work-related fatality rate for commercial fishermen in Alaska is still very high, it does appear to be decreasing: since 1990, there has been a 51 percent decline in the annual fatality rate. The successes in commercial fishing are due in part to the U.S. Coast Guard implementing new safety requirements in the early 1990s. These safety requirements contributed to 96 percent of commercial fishermen surviving vessel sinkings/capsizings in 2004, whereas in 1991, only 73 percent survived. While the number of occupational deaths of commercial fishermen in Alaska has been reduced, there is a continuing pattern of losing 20 to 40 vessels every year. There are still about 100 fishermen who must be rescued each year from cold Alaska waters. Successful rescue is still dependent on the expertly trained personnel of the US Coast Guard Search and Rescue operations, but their efforts can be hindered by the harshness of seas and the weather. Furthermore, the people involved in Search and Rescue operations are themselves at considerable risk of injury or death during these rescue attempts.

== Gallery ==
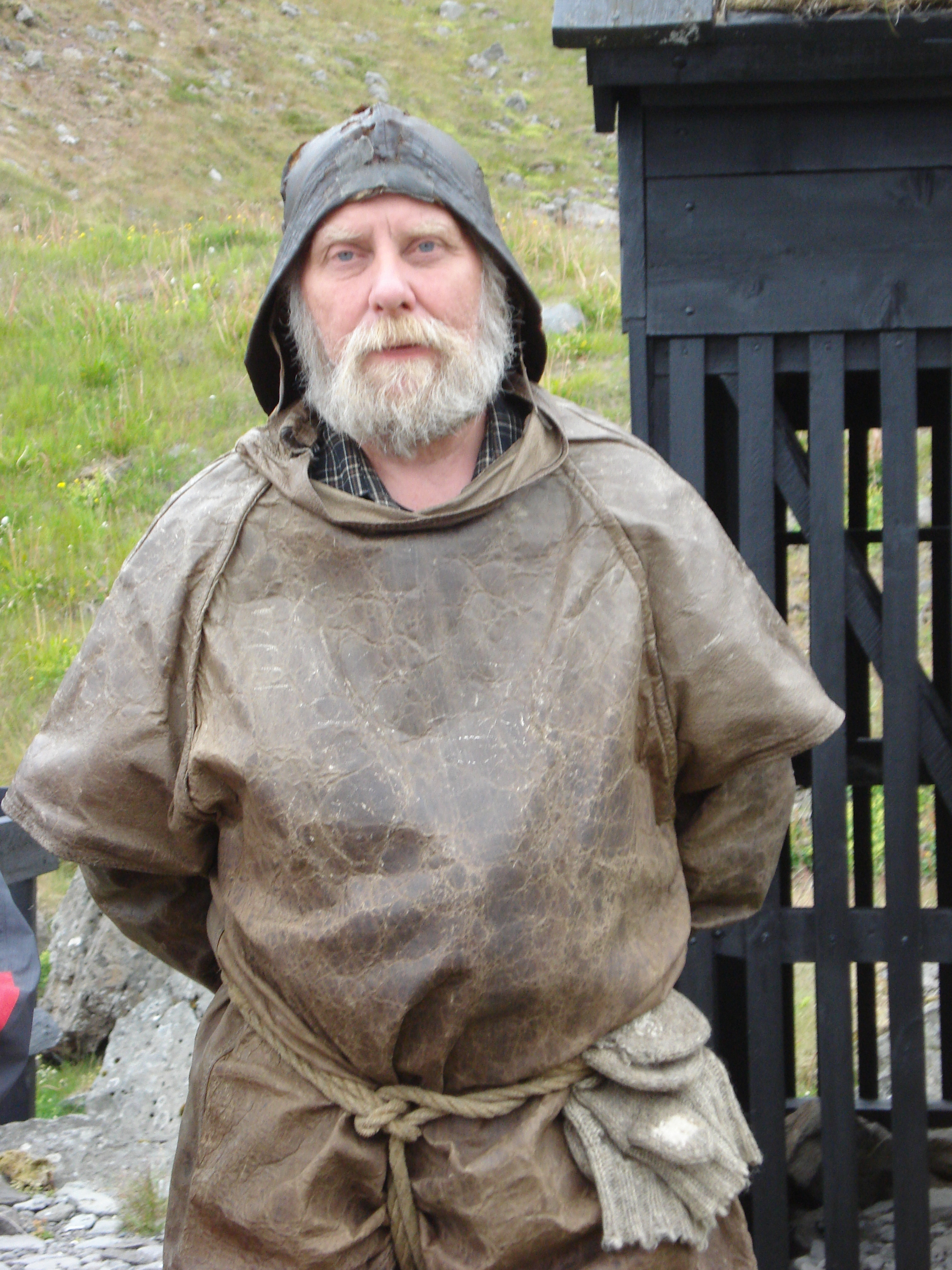
Traditional Icelandic fisherman

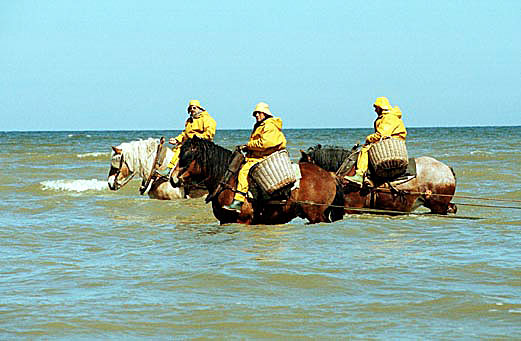
Belgium shrimpers on horseback

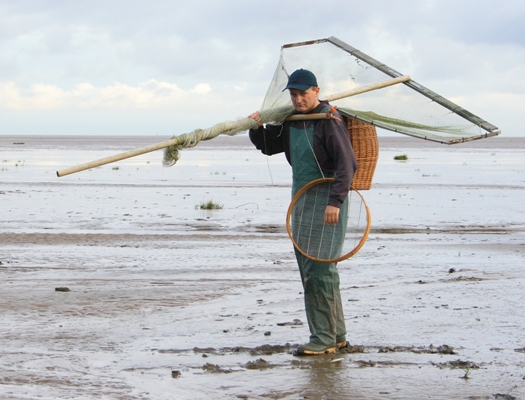
English shrimper with pushnet

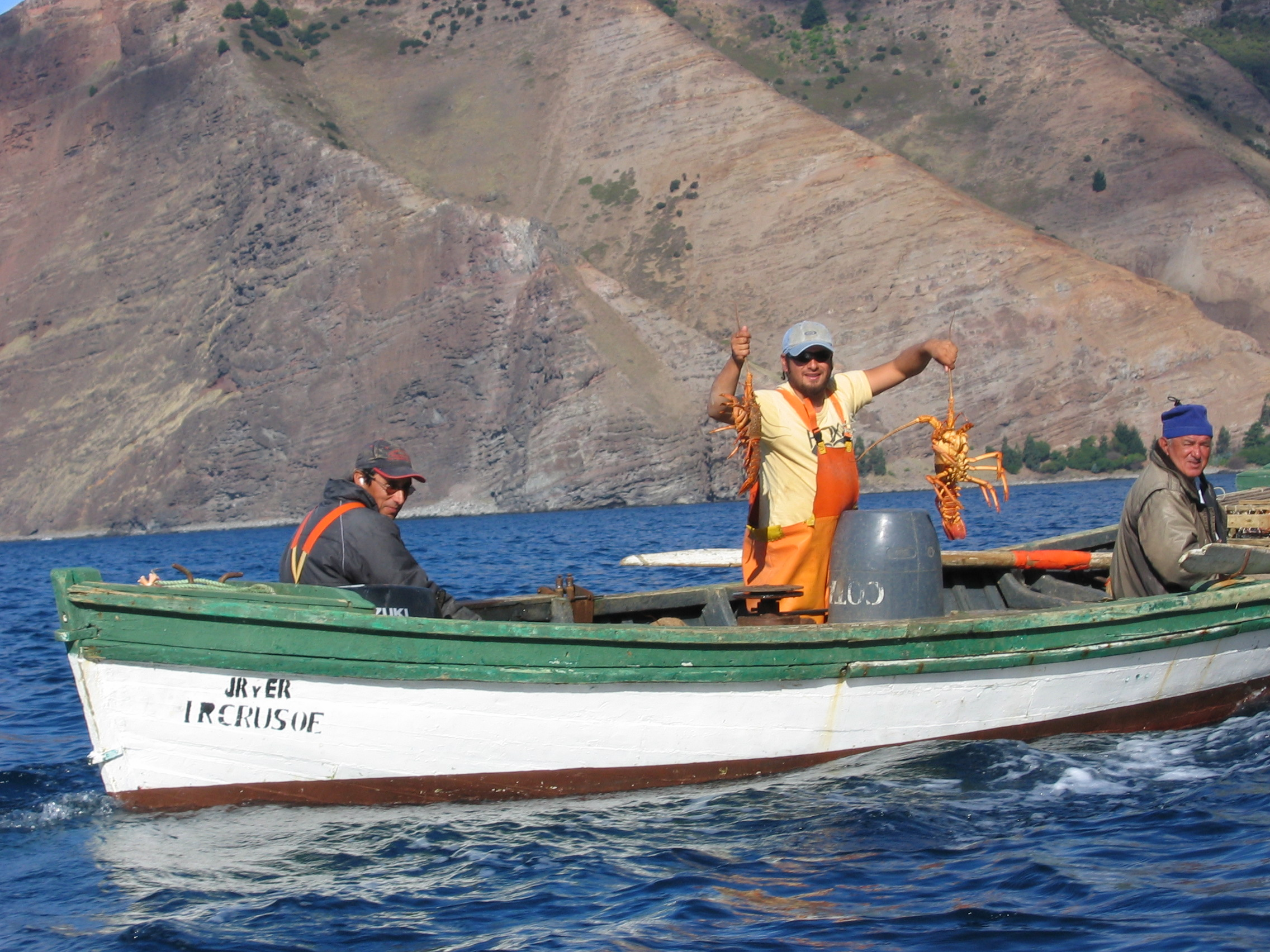
Chilean fishermen with lobsters

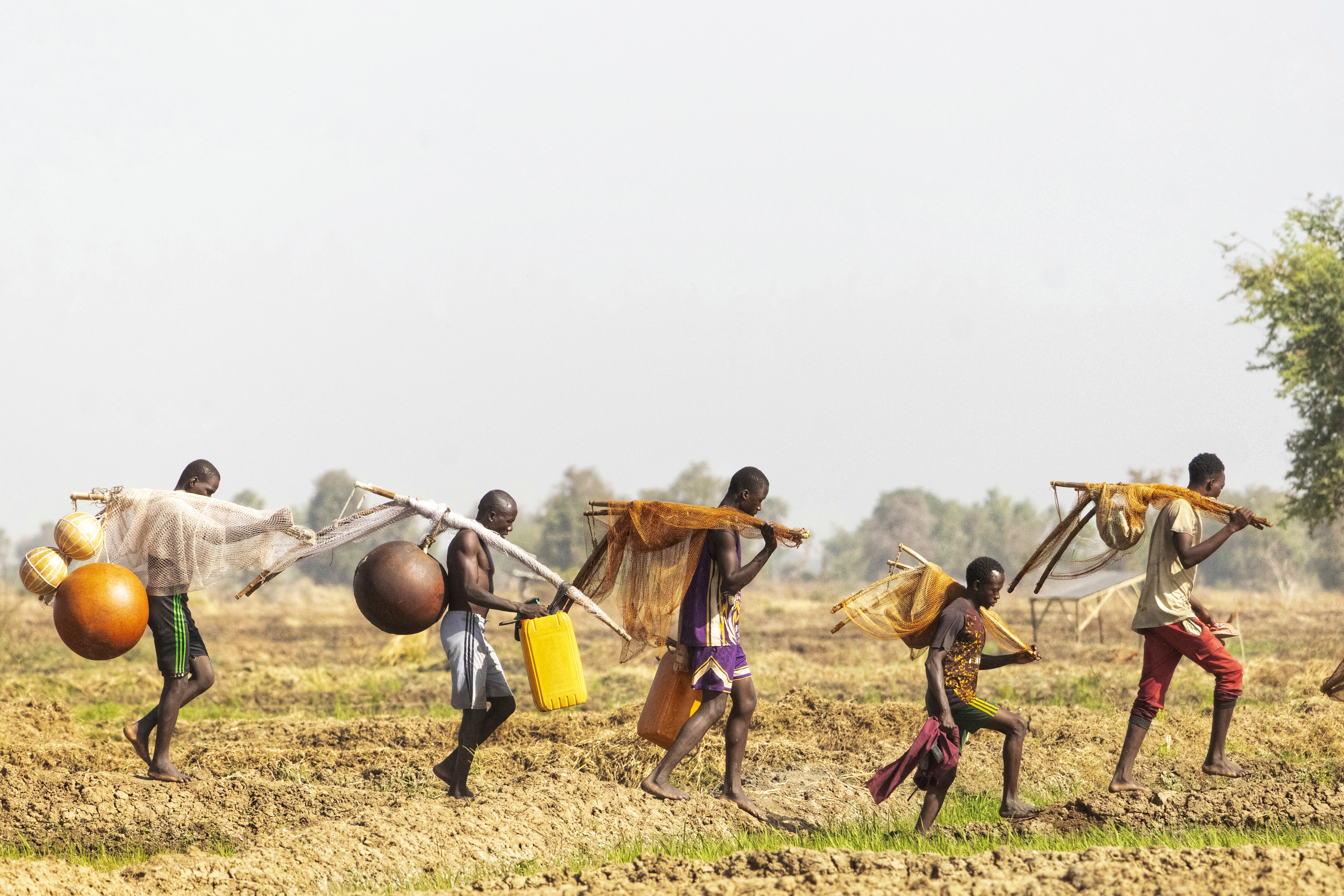
Nigerian fishermen with bottle gourds and fishnets

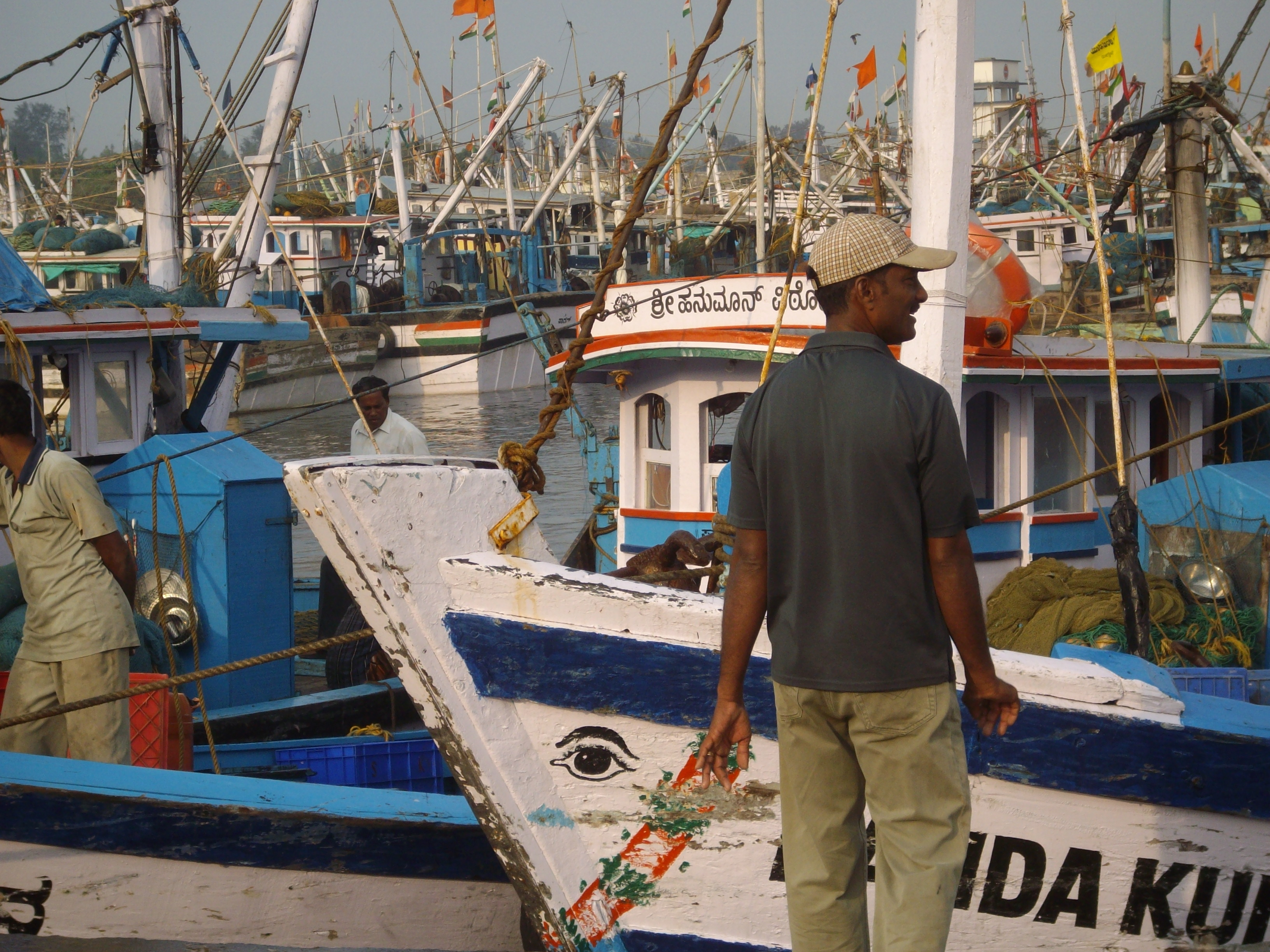
Indian fisherman

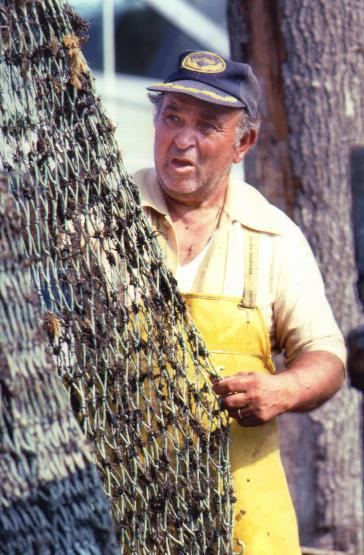
Long Island fisherman

== See also ==
- Fishing
- Recreational fishing
- Aquaculture
- Fish farming
- Fishery
- List of American fishers
