= Bradley Beesley =

American film director

Bradley Beesley is an American Independent film and video director, producer and cinematographer. Born in Oklahoma and based in Austin, Texas, he "has made a cinematic career documenting oddball Americana, strange sub-cultures and homegrown rock stars."

== Background ==
Beesley has long been associated with the Oklahoma City-based alternative rock band The Flaming Lips, filming some promotional videos for the band's album Hit to Death in the Future Head. Most of Beesley's video work with the band is included on the VOID video retrospective.

Aside from his work with The Flaming Lips, Beesley has directed a number of award-winning documentaries. His first was 1999's "Hill Stomp Hollar", a one-hour film about the Fat Possum record label and many of the blues artists, particularly R. L. Burnside.

Beesley's next film Okie Noodling (2001) focused on the unusual practice of catching catfish using only the bare hand as bait. It featured an original soundtrack by The Flaming Lips and won the Audience Choice Award and was runner-up for Best Documentary at the 2001 South by Southwest film festival.

In 2005, Beesley released the documentary The Fearless Freaks: The Wondrously Improbable Story of The Flaming Lips. Critics said the film offered an unusually personal and intimate view into the band.

The Flaming Lips also provided the soundtrack for the documentary that Beesley produced and co-directed, Summercamp!, which opened July 18, 2007.

Beesley has often worked with the American visual and recording artist Craig Smith. In 2013 Beesley and Smith presented photographs from and a screening of the film Sweethearts of the Prison Rodeo as part of an international visual art exhibition held at CEPA Gallery in Buffalo, New York entitled Art of Sport. In 2009 Beesley and Smith presented photographs from the film Sweethearts of the Prison Rodeo at the BFI London Film Festival in the UK and the University of the Arts London London College of Communication. Earlier that year an exhibition of photographs from Beesley's Sweethearts of the Prison Rodeo by Craig Smith and Shane Brown was held at the Super!Alright in Austin, Texas during the film's premiere at the South by Southwest (SXSW) Film Festival. Smith's photographs for Beesley's film Okie Noodling (2001) were featured in the US magazine Sports Illustrated prior to the completion of the film's sequel.

== Filmography ==
- Slacker 2011 (2011) (segment)
- Sweethearts of the Prison Rodeo (2009) - Director, co-producer, co-camera
- Christmas on Mars (2008) - Cinematographer and narrator
- Summercamp! (2007) - Producer and co-director (with Sarah Price)
- U.F.O.s at the Zoo: The Flaming Lips Live in Oklahoma City (2007) - Co-director
- Roller Girls (2006) - Co-director (with Dan Brown, Tina Gazzerro, and Mark Miks
- The Fearless Freaks (2005) - Director
- Okie Noodling (2001) - Producer and director
- Hill Stomp Hollar (1999) - Director
- Car Wish 2000 (1999) - Director
- Road Kill Zoo (2014)- Director

== Videography ==
- The Flaming Lips: "Frogs" (1992) - Co-directed with Wayne Coyne
- The Flaming Lips: "Turn It On" (1993) - Co-directed with Wayne Coyne
- The Flaming Lips: "She Don't Use Jelly" (1993) - Co-directed with Wayne Coyne
- The Flaming Lips: "Be My Head" (1994) - Co-directed with Wayne Coyne
- The Flaming Lips: "Christmas at the Zoo" (1995) - Co-directed with Wayne Coyne
- The Flaming Lips: "Bad Days" (1995) - Co-directed with Wayne Coyne
- The Flaming Lips: "When You Smile" (1995) - Co-directed with Wayne Coyne
- The Flaming Lips: "Waitin' for a Superman" (1999) - Co-directed with Wayne Coyne
- The Flaming Lips: "Race for the Prize" (1999) - Co-directed with Wayne Coyne
- The Flaming Lips: "Do You Realize??" (2002) - Co-directed with Wayne Coyne
- The Flaming Lips: "Yoshimi Battles the Pink Robots, pt. 1" (2002) - Co-directed with Wayne Coyne
- The Flaming Lips: "Fight Test" (2002) - Co-directed with Wayne Coyne
- Biffy Clyro: "My Recovery Injection" (2003)
- Biffy Clyro: "Questions and Answers" (2004)
- The Flaming Lips: "SpongeBob & Patrick Confront the Psychic Wall of Energy" (2004) - Co-directed with Wayne Coyne
- The Flaming Lips: "Mr. Ambulance Driver" (2004) - Co-directed with Wayne Coyne
- The Flaming Lips: "The W.A.N.D. (The Will Always Negates Defeat)" (2006)
- Mojave 3: "Breaking the Ice" (2006)
