= Chicken hypnotism =

Hypnosis of chickens

A chicken being "hypnotized"

A chicken can be hypnotized, or put into a trance, with its head down near the ground, by drawing a line along the ground with a stick or a finger, starting at the beak and extending straight outward in front of the chicken. If the chicken is hypnotized in this manner, it will continue to stare at the line and remain immobile for as long as 30 minutes. Other methods of inducing this state are also known. Ethologists refer to this state as 'tonic immobility', i.e. a natural state of semi-paralysis that some animals enter when presented with a threat.

An early reference of this phenomenon was described in 1646 in Ars Magna Lucis et Umbrae by Athanasius Kircher.

== Methods ==
One technique of hypnosis is to hold the chicken face up with its back on the ground, and then run a finger downwards from the chicken's wattles to just above its vent. The chicken's feet are exposed, which allows easy application of medication for foot mites, etc. Clapping hands or giving the chicken a gentle shove will waken it.

One can also hypnotize a chicken by mimicking how it sleeps – with its head under its wing. In this method, the bird is held firmly, placing its head under its wing. Then, the chicken is rocked gently back and forth and set very carefully on the ground. When this is done it generally stays in the same position for about 30 seconds. H.B. Gibson, in his book Hypnosis – its Nature and Therapeutic Uses, states that the record period for a chicken remaining under hypnosis is 3 hours, 47 minutes.

== Notable practitioners ==
Werner Herzog is "known to hypnotize chickens; he also hypnotized the cast of his 1976 film Heart of Glass".

Steve Fairnie, a 1980s British musician, advised: "You have to dominate the chicken and be right above it staring into its eyes. Then it will either go under or it will viciously attack you, so you have to be a bit careful...".

== In popular culture ==
- Friedrich Nietzsche, 19th-century German philosopher, in his book Thus Spoke Zarathustra used a philosophical metaphor referring to the hypnosis of the chicken. It is in Chapter 6, "The Pale Criminal", and reads as follows: "The streak of chalk bewitcheth the hen; the stroke he struck bewitched his weak reason. Madness AFTER the deed, I call this." Nietzsche employs this metaphor again within the third essay of On the Genealogy of Morality, stating, "The unhappy man has heard, has understood; he is like a hen around which a line has been drawn. He cannot get out of this drawn circle."
- It is mentioned in the 1938 Agatha Christie novel Appointment with Death.
- Clark Gable, in the 1945 film Adventure, hypnotizes a rooster while he and Greer Garson try to lure chickens from behind the bush by using the rooster as bait.
- Werner Herzog has included chicken hypnotism in several films, including the 1968 Signs of Life, which features a scene in which a chicken is hypnotized by a line drawn by chalk, and his 1974 film The Enigma of Kaspar Hauser.
- Federico Fellini's 1984 And the Ship Sails On features a scene in which a male opera singer hypnotises a chicken in the mess hall.
- Ernest Hemingway briefly describes the process in The Dangerous Summer, comparing it to the hypnotic effect of a bullfighters' cape.
- The 1993 film Even Cowgirls Get the Blues has some lines about chicken hypnotism and shows a character hypnotizing chickens by twirling them in the air exactly twenty times.
- The United States military, when trying to avoid divulging information, gives reporters briefings with 25 minutes of intentionally dull PowerPoint presentations and 5 minutes left at the end for questions from anyone who is still awake. The presentations are called hypnotizing chickens.
- Thomas B. Hess, art critic and long time editor of ARTnews, used chicken hypnotism to describe Barnett Newman's iconic "zip" paintings in a March 1950 review: "There were some terrific optical illusions: if you stared closely at the big red painting with the thin white stripe, its bottom seemed to shoot out at your ankles, and the rectangular canvas itself appeared wildly distorted. It is quite like what happens to a hen when its beak is put on the ground and a chalk line drawn away from it on the floor. However, very few spectators actually became hypnotized".
- The Iggy Pop song "Lust for Life" contains a line referring to "hypnotizing chickens", in a nod to William Burroughs' novel The Ticket That Exploded.
- Australian Test cricketer Max Walker included chicken hypnotism in the title of his book How to Hypnotise Chooks (1987) — chooks being Australian slang for chicken.
- Danny Glover hypnotizes a rooster in the 1990 film To Sleep with Anger.

== See also ==
- Snake charming
- Trout tickling
