= And the Ship Sails On =

- Italian release poster
- Directed by: Federico Fellini
- Written by: Federico Fellini; Tonino Guerra; Andrea Zanzotto (lyrics); Catherine Breillat (French version)
- Produced by: Franco Cristaldi; Renzo Rossellini (uncredited); Daniel Toscan du Plantier (uncredited)
- Starring: Freddie Jones; Barbara Jefford; Victor Poletti; Peter Cellier; Elisa Mainardi; Norma West; Paolo Paoloni; Sarah Jane Varley; Fiorenzo Serra; Pina Bausch; Pasquale Zito
- Cinematography: Giuseppe Rotunno
- Edited by: Ruggero Mastroianni (a.m.c.)
- Music by: Gianfranco Plenizio (choreography by Leonetta Bentivoglio)
- Distributed by: Gaumont Distribution
- Release date: 7 September 1983
- Running time: 132 minutes
- Countries: Italy; France
- Language: Italian
- Box office: $226

And the Ship Sails On (Italian: E la nave va) is a 1983 Italian satirical comedy film directed and co-written by Federico Fellini. It depicts the events on board a luxury liner filled with the friends of a deceased opera singer who have gathered to mourn her. The film was selected as the Italian entry for the Best Foreign Language Film at the 56th Academy Awards, but was not accepted as a nominee.

== Plot ==
The film opens depicting a scene in July 1914 immediately prior to the cruise ship Gloria N. setting sail from Naples Harbor. The opening sequence is in sepia tones, as if it were a film shot in that era, with no sound other than the whirring of the projector. Gradually the sepia fades into full colour and we can hear the characters’ dialogue.

Orlando, an Italian journalist, supplies commentary by directly addressing the camera, explaining to the viewer that the cruise is a funeral voyage to disperse the ashes of opera singer Edmea Tetua near the island of Erimo, her birthplace. Considered the greatest singer of all time, Tetua is celebrated for her goddess-like voice.

The bumbling but lovable journalist also provides highly subjective anecdotes and gossip on the wide array of cartoon characters that evoke the golden age of the "funny papers" (Little Nemo, Bringing Up Father, The Katzenjammer Kids) but with a perverse Felliniesque twist. These include more opera singers, voice teachers, orchestra directors, theatre producers, actors, prime ministers, counts, princesses, Grand Dukes, and panic-stricken fans of the deceased diva.

A jealous and bitter soprano named Ildebranda desperately tries to penetrate the secret behind Edmea Tetua's unforgettable voice. A bristle-haired Russian basso is shown around the ship's vast mess hall where, using only his voice, he hypnotizes a chicken. A curly-cued actor travels with his mother in order to seduce sailors. Sir Reginald Dongby, a voyeuristic English aristocrat, relishes spying on Lady Violet, his nymphomaniac wife. The Grand Duke of Harzock, a Prussian, is an obese bubble of a young man whose blind sister (the Tanztheater performer and choreographer Pina Bausch) schemes with her lover, the prime minister, to disinherit her brother. The brooding Count of Bassano closets himself in his cabin transformed into a temple dedicated to the diva's memory.

An awful stench rises from the ship's hold and soon it's revealed that a love-sick rhinoceros has been neglected by the ship's crew. The beast is pulled up, washed on deck, and returned to the hold with fresh water and hay.

On the third day of the voyage, the passengers discover a crowd of shipwrecked Serbians camped on the deck of the ship. Fleeing in rafts towards Italy after the assassination at Sarajevo, the refugees were brought on board the previous night by the captain. The Grand Duke and his men, however, are convinced the Serbians are terrorists and order the captain to isolate the group to a corner of the ship. The upshot is Fellini's barely disguised take on the Marx Brothers's A Night at the Opera in a heady mix of cultures, both ethnic and artistic, where aristocrats and snobs joyfully share the stage (the ship's deck) with peasants and vibrant Serbian folklore (as choreographed by Leonetta Bentivoglio).

But the revels end when the menacing flagship of the Austro-Hungarian fleet sails into view, demanding the return of the Serbian refugees. The captain agrees on condition that Edmea Tetua's ashes be dispersed at Erimo beforehand. After the ceremony, the refugees are loaded into a lifeboat for delivery to the Austrians but a young Serbian hurls a bomb at the flagship, causing pandemonium. The Austrians respond by cannon fire. The Gloria N. sinks while Albertini wields his baton, aristocrats march to the lifeboats, a grand piano slides across the floor smashing mirrors, and butterflies twitter serenely above the melee of suitcases in flooded corridors.

In a reverse tracking shot, Fellini reveals the stupendous behind-the-scenes of his floating opera of a movie - giant hydraulic jacks (constructed by Oscar-winning set designer, Dante Ferretti) that created the ship's rolling sea movements, along with acres of plastic ocean, an army of technicians burning naphthalene for the smoke of disaster effect, and, finally, an enigmatic figure that may be Orlando or Fellini intentionally hiding behind his own camera filming the main camera filming himself.

The main camera then tracks forward to a final shot of Orlando in a lifeboat with the rhinoceros happily munching on hay. "Did you know," confides Orlando, "that a rhinoceros gives very good milk?" Laughing, he once again mans the oars to disappear on a vast plastic ocean.

== Cast ==
- Freddie Jones as Orlando
- Barbara Jefford as Ildebranda Cuffari
- Victor Poletti as Aureliano Fuciletto
- Peter Cellier as Sir Reginald Dongby
- Elisa Mainardi as Teresa Valegnani
- Norma West as Lady Violet Dongby
- Paolo Paoloni as Master Albertini
- Sarah-Jane Varley as Dorotea
- Fiorenzo Serra as The Grand Duke
- Pina Bausch as The Princess
- Pasquale Zito as Count Bassano
- Linda Polan as Ines Ruffo Saltini
- Philip Locke as Prime Minister
- Jonathan Cecil as Ricotin
- Maurice Barrier as Ilya Ziloev
- Fred Williams as Sabatino Lepori
- Elizabeth Kaza
- Colin Higgins as Police chief
- Vittorio Zarfati as Second Master Rubetti
- Umberto Zuanelli as First Master Rubetti
- Claudio Ciocca as Second officer
- Antonio Vezza as The Captain
- Alessandro Partexano as Official
- Domenico Pertica as Pastor
- Christian Fremont
- Marielle Duvelle
- Helen Stirling
- Janet Suzman as Edmea Tetua

The singers:

- Mara Zampieri as Ildebranda Cuffari
- Elizabeth Norberg Schulz as Ines Ruffo Saltini
- Nucci Condò as Teresa Valegnani
- Giovanni Bavaglio as Fuciletto
- Carlo Di Giacomo as Sabatino Lepori
- Boris Carmeli as Ilya Ziloev

The Serbs:

- Elizabeth Norberg Schulz as 1st Soprano
- Bernadette Lucarini as 2nd Soprano
- Bruno Beccaria as Tenor

Other performers:

- Umberto Barone as Scala
- Monica Bertolotti
- Danika La Loggia
- Roberto Caporali as Dorotea's father
- Franca Maresa as Dorotea's mother
- Savatore Calabrese as Banker
- Johna Mancini as Superintendent's secretary
- Filippo Degara
- Francesco Scali
- Cecilia Cerocchi as Superintendent's wife
- Pietro Fumelli
- Franco Angrisano as The cook
- Ugo Fangareggi as The bartender

== Reception ==
=== Critical response ===
Screened out of competition at the 40th Venice Film Festival, the film received a fifteen-minute standing ovation. The film has an 82% approval rating on Rotten Tomatoes, based on 11 reviews with an average rating of 6.8/10.

Writing for the Italian weekly magazine L'Espresso, novelist and film critic Alberto Moravia saw the film as an intuitive critique of European society that preceded the First World War. "What is brilliant," explained Moravia, "is the intuition that European society of the Belle Epoque had emptied itself of all humanism leaving only an artificial and exhaustive formalism. The result was a society founded on a continuous yet contemptible melodrama. The other genial intuition is that of the fundamental unity of the world back then which was completely bourgeois or utterly obsessed with the bourgeoisie. This idea comes through magnificently in the scene where immaculate opera singers perform leaning over the iron balcony of the engine room as sweat-grimed workers cease stoking the furnace with coal to listen to the splendid voices." The film ranked 7th on Cahiers du Cinéma's Top 10 Films of the Year List in 1984.

== See also ==
- List of submissions to the 56th Academy Awards for Best Foreign Language Film
- List of Italian submissions for the Academy Award for Best Foreign Language Film
