= Apparent death =

Animals playing dead

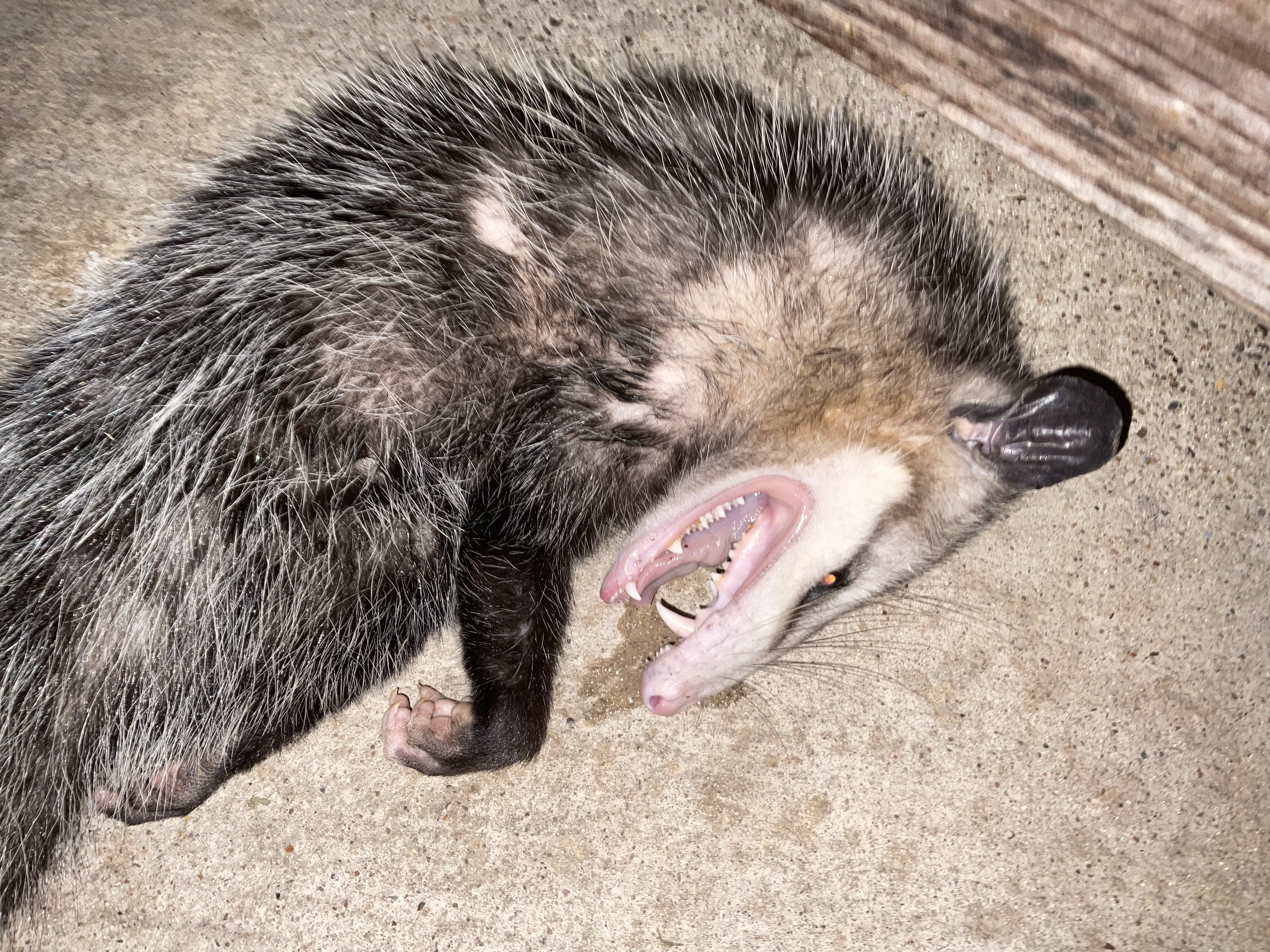
A Virginia opossum (Didelphis virginiana) playing dead

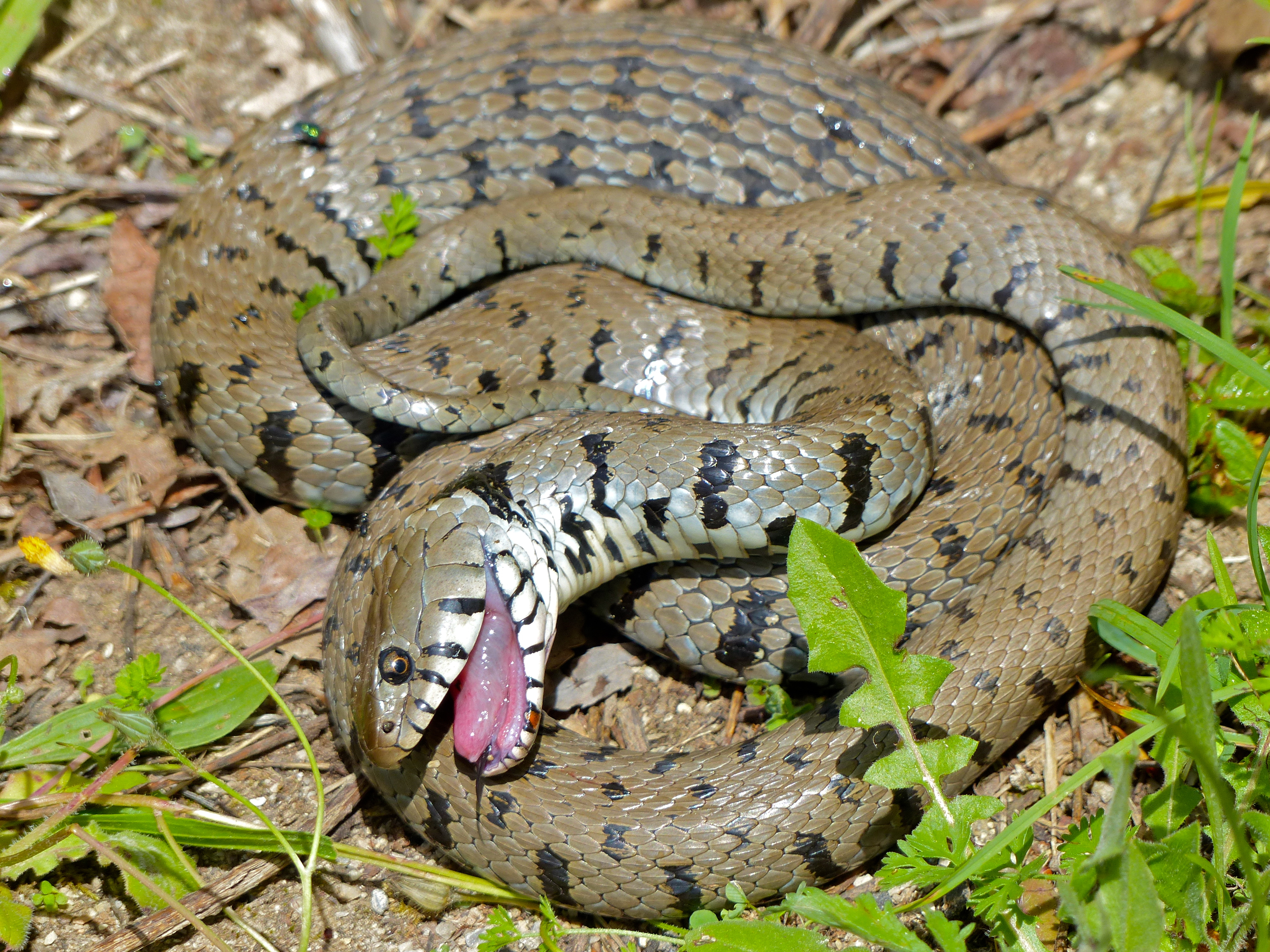
A barred grass snake (Natrix helvetica) playing dead

Apparent death (Note: Alternative names include playing dead, feigning death, playing possum, thanatosis, animal hypnosis, immobilization catatonia, or tonic immobility, the latter of which is preferred in the scientific literature on the subject.) is a behavior in which animals take on the appearance of being dead. It is an immobile state most often triggered by a predatory attack and can be found in a wide range of animals from insects and crustaceans to mammals, birds, reptiles, amphibians, and fish. Apparent death is separate from the freezing behavior seen in some animals.

Apparent death is a form of animal deception considered to be an anti-predator strategy, but it can also be used as a form of aggressive mimicry. When induced by humans, the state is sometimes colloquially known as animal hypnosis. Early written descriptions of "animal hypnosis" include Daniel Schwenter's Deliciae physico-mathematicae (1636) and Athanasius Kircher's "experimentum mirabile" with a hen in Ars magna lucis et umbrae (1646).

== Description ==
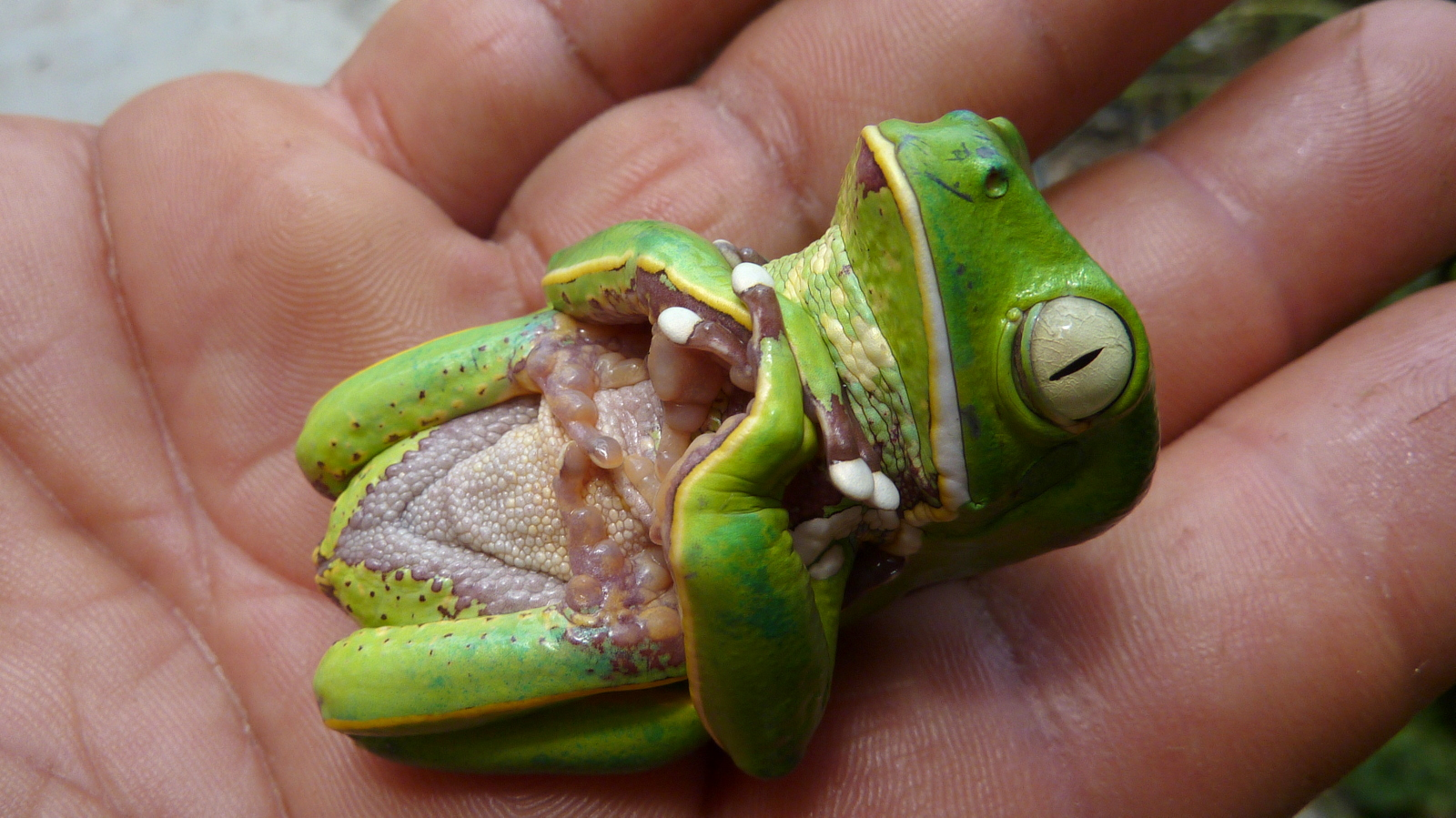
Burmeister's leaf frog playing dead

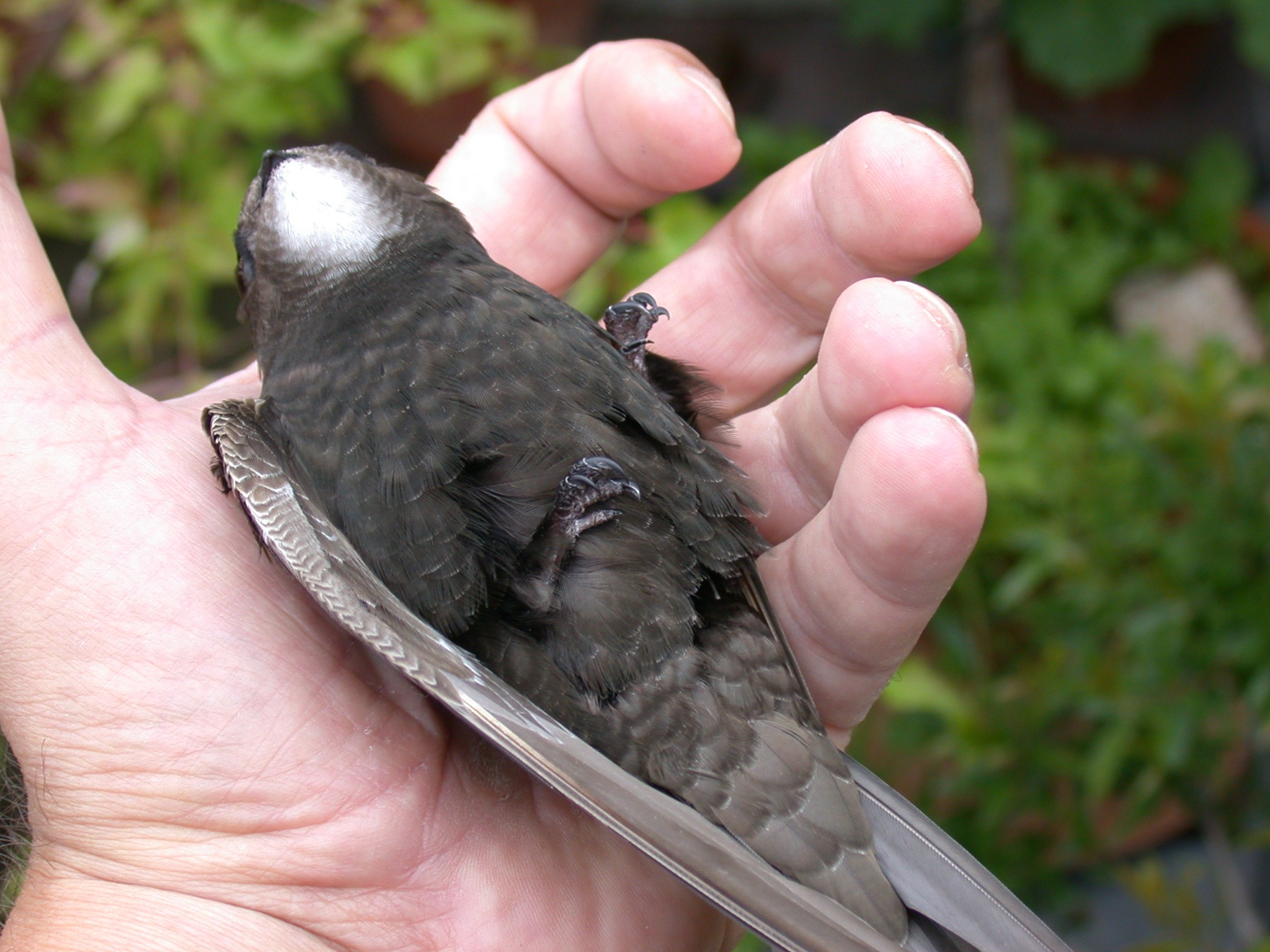
Young common swift playing dead

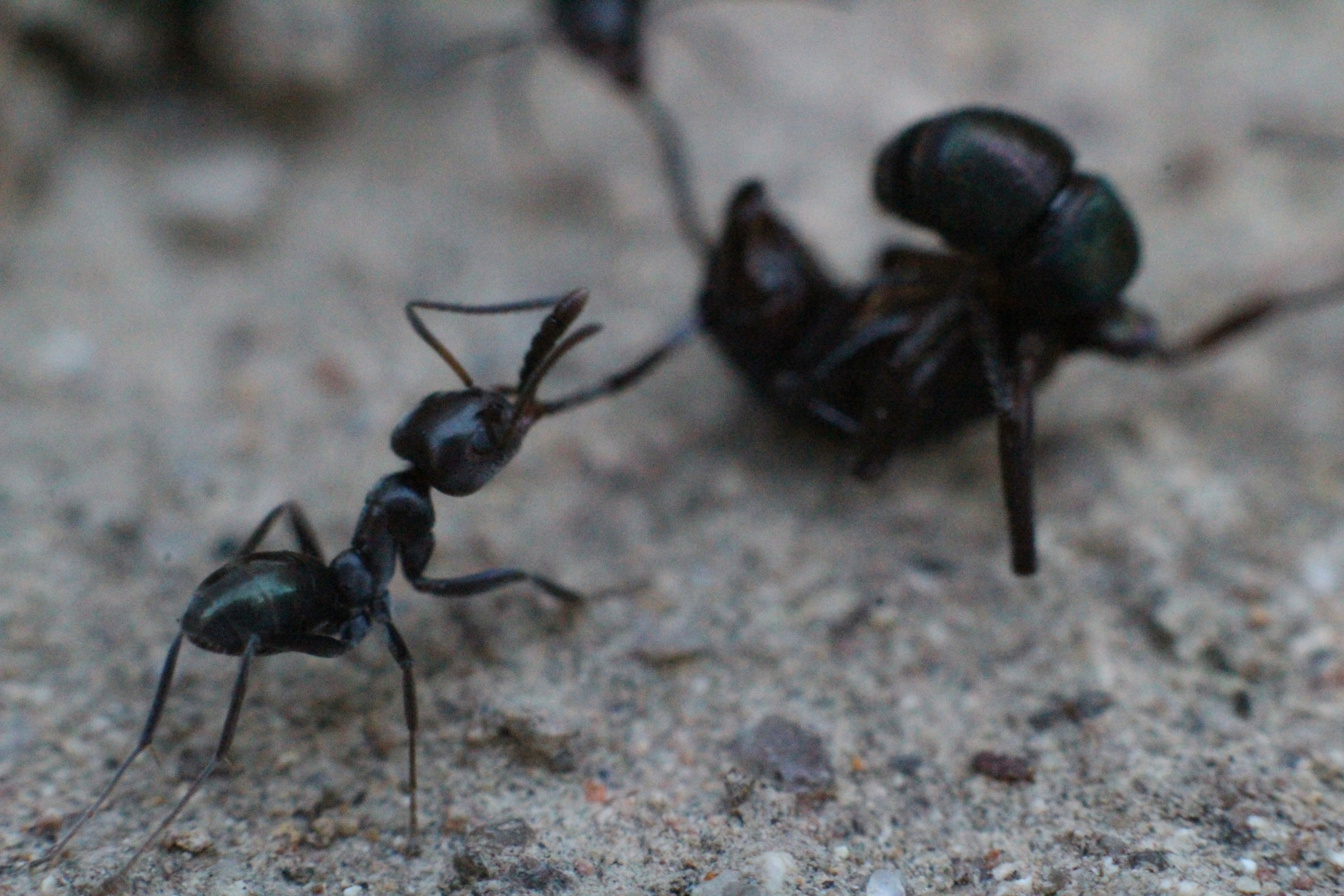
Black house ants attacking a green-head ant which has gone into tonic immobility

Tonic immobility (also known as the act of feigning death, or exhibiting thanatosis) is a behaviour in which some animals become apparently temporarily paralysed and unresponsive to external stimuli. Tonic immobility is most generally considered to be an anti-predator behavior because it occurs most often in response to an extreme threat such as being captured by a (perceived) predator. Some animals use it to attract prey or facilitate reproduction. For example, in sharks exhibiting the behaviour, some scientists relate it to mating, arguing that biting by the male immobilizes the female and thus facilitates mating.

Despite appearances, some animals remain conscious throughout tonic immobility. Evidence for this includes the occasional responsive movement, scanning of the environment and animals in tonic immobility often taking advantage of escape opportunities. 'Tonic immobility' is preferred in the literature because it has neutral connotations compared to 'thanatosis' which has a strong association with death.

== Difference from freezing ==
Tonic immobility is different from freezing behavior in animals. A deer in headlights and an opossum "playing dead" are common examples of an animal freezing and tonic immobility, respectively. Freezing occurs early during a predator-prey interaction when the prey detects and identifies the threat, but the predator has not yet seen the prey. Because freezing occurs before detection and is used to better camouflage the prey and prevent the predator from attacking, it is considered a primary defense mechanism.

Tonic immobility occurs after the predator has detected and or made contact with the prey, and is likely used to prevent further attack by the predator or consumption of the prey. Because tonic immobility occurs later in the predator attack sequence, it is considered a secondary defense mechanism and is therefore distinct from freezing. Although freezing animals become rigid, they often stay upright and do not change their posture while frozen whereas during tonic immobility, animals often become rigid and change their posture.

Freezing behavior and tonic immobility are similar in that both may induce bradycardia (slowing of the heart rate), but the freezing response may instead be accompanied by rapid or increased breathing rate, increased heart rate, increased blood pressure and inhibition of digestion, depending on whether the sympathetic or parasympathetic nervous system is engaged. In contrast, along with bradycardia, vertebrates in tonic immobility often reduce their breathing rate or protrude their tongue, further distinguishing this behavior from the freezing response.

== Defensive ==
For defensive purposes, thanatosis hinges on the pursuer's becoming unresponsive to its victim, as most predators only catch live prey.

In beetles, artificial selection experiments have shown that there is heritable variation for length of death-feigning. Those selected for longer death-feigning durations are at a selective advantage to those at shorter durations when a predator is introduced, which suggests that thanatosis is indeed adaptive.

In the hog-nosed snake, a threatened individual rolls onto its back and appears to be dead when threatened by a predator, while a foul-smelling, volatile fluid oozes from its body. Predators, such as cats, then lose interest in the snake, which both looks and smells dead. One reason for their loss of interest is that rotten-smelling animals are instinctively avoided as a precaution against infectious disease, so the snake's adaptions exploit that reaction. Newly hatched young also instinctively show this behaviour when rats try to eat them.

In mammals, the Virginia opossum (commonly known simply as possums) is perhaps the best known example of defensive thanatosis. "Playing possum" is an idiomatic phrase which means "pretending to be dead". It comes from a characteristic of the Virginia opossum, which is famous for reacting with a death-like posture when threatened. This instinct does not always pay off in the modern world; for example, opossums scavenging roadkill may react with the death-like posture to the threat posed by oncoming traffic, and subsequently end up as roadkill themselves. "Playing possum" can also mean simply pretending to be injured, unconscious, asleep, or otherwise vulnerable, often to lure an opponent into a vulnerable position.

The usual advice for humans attempting to survive an attack by a brown bear is to lie face down, cover the face with one's hands/arms/elbows, and 'play dead'.

Thanatosis has also been observed in many invertebrates such as the wasp Nasonia vitripennis, and the cricket, Gryllus bimaculatus.

== Reproductive ==
In the spider species Pisaura mirabilis, male spiders often stage elaborate rituals of gift-giving and thanatosis to avoid getting eaten by female spiders during mating. Studies have shown higher chances of success in mating with females for males who exhibit death-feigning more frequently than for males who do it less.

== Predatory ==
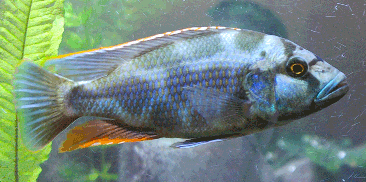
Cichlids of the genus Nimbochromis use thanatosis as a form of aggressive mimicry, playing dead to attract prey

Nimbochromis (sleeper cichlids), endemic to Lake Malawi in East Africa, are large predatory fish for whom thanatosis is a form of aggressive mimicry. This fish will lie down on its side on the bottom sediments and assume a blotchy coloration. Scavengers, attracted to what seems like a dead fish, will approach the predator to investigate. N. livingstoni then abandons the thanatosis, righting itself again and quickly eating any scavenger unfortunate enough to come too close. A similar strategy has also been observed in the African cichlid Lamprologus lemairii from Lake Tanganyika and in the Central American yellowjacket cichlid Parachromis friedrichsthalii.

== Examples ==
=== Invertebrates ===
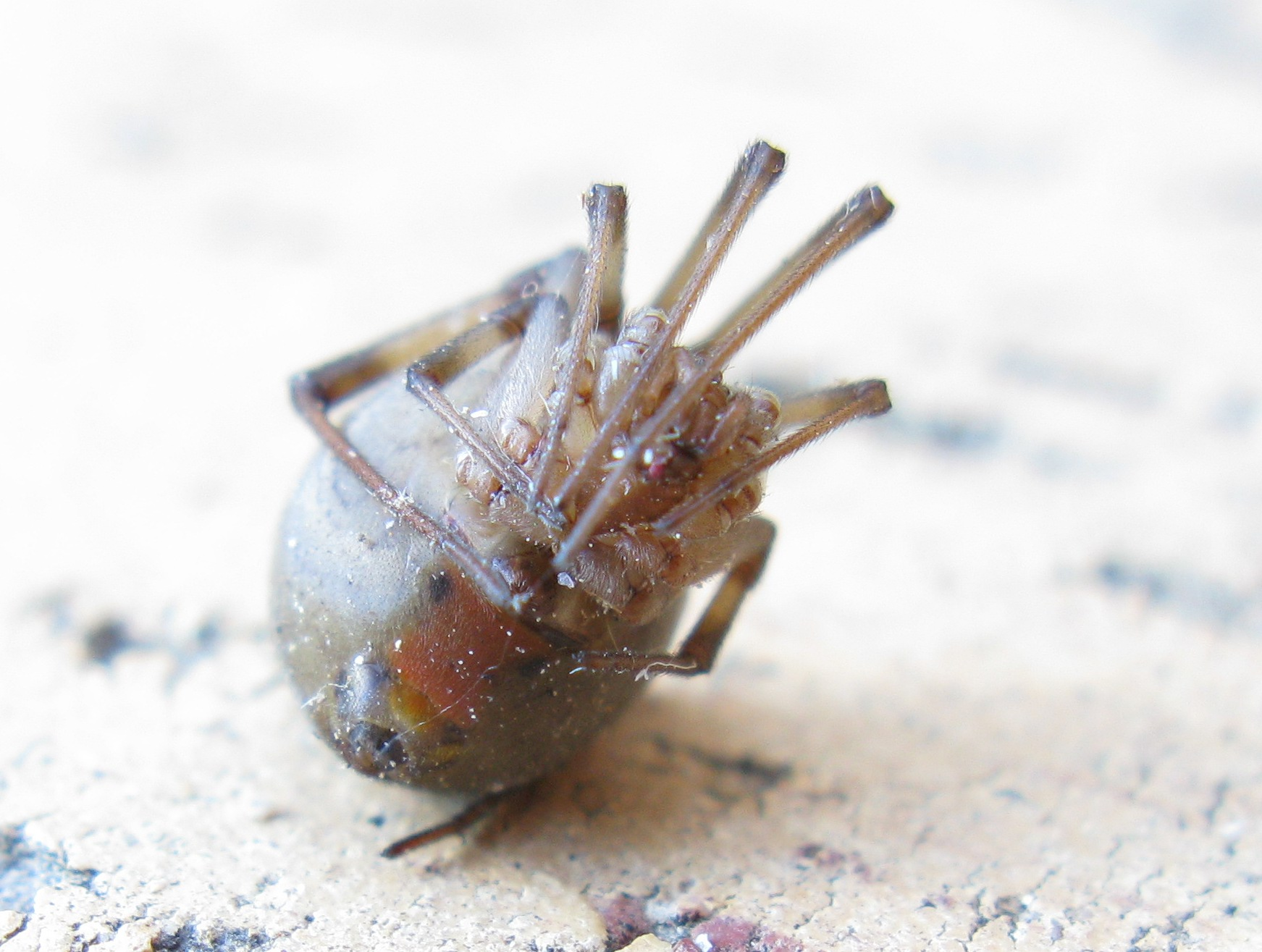
A brown widow spider resorting to thanatosis after being shaken from her web

Amongst invertebrates, tonic immobility is widespread throughout phylum Arthropoda and has been demonstrated to occur in beetles, moths, mantids, cicadas, crickets, spiders, wasps, bees, pillbugs and ants.

==== Wasps ====
Tonic immobility has been observed in several species of parasitoid wasp and is considered to be an antipredator behavior in these insects. In wasps, tonic immobility can be induced by tapping their antennae, tapping the abdomen repeatedly, or squeezing their abdomen. A study in 2020 found that the frequency and duration of tonic immobility was affected by the sex of the wasp and the temperature of the environment, but not the color of the background the wasp was on. These results were consistent with a study in 2006 that found no effect of background color on tonic immobility in a different wasp species, Nasonia vitripennis.

==== Fire ants ====
In fire ant colonies, tonic immobility is used by young workers to avoid conflict with competing ants. In the fire ant species Solenopsis invicta, the tendency to exhibit thanatosis decreases with age, with older ants choosing to fight with any workers from neighboring colonies. By using tonic immobility to evade conflict, the researchers found that the young ants were four times more likely to survive an attack compared to their older counterparts, despite being more vulnerable due to their softer exoskeletons.

==== Spiders ====
In the nuptial gift-giving spider, thanatosis is incorporated into their mating display. A study in 2008 demonstrated that male Pisaura mirabilis spiders who displayed thanatosis were more likely to copulate with females and copulated longer.

==== Green lacewings ====
Larvae of Chrysoperla plorabunda engage in tonic immobility when they come into close proximity with a predator. Usage of tonic immobility as an antipredator strategy has been shown to vary with energy availability and within-population genetic variation, with lacewings under energetic stress being more likely to engage in tonic immobility.

=== Vertebrates ===
Tonic immobility has been observed in a large number of vertebrate taxa, including sharks, fish, amphibians, reptiles, birds, and mammals.

==== Sharks ====
Some sharks can be induced into tonic immobility by inverting them and restraining them by hand, e.g. dogfish sharks, lemon sharks, whitetip reef sharks. For tiger sharks (measuring 3–4 metres in length), tonic immobility can be induced by humans placing their hands lightly on the sides of the animal's snout in the area surrounding the eyes. During tonic immobility in sharks, the dorsal fins straighten, and both breathing and muscle contractions become more steady and relaxed. This state persists for an average of 15 minutes before recovery and the resumption of active behaviour. Scientists have exploited this response to study shark behaviour; chemical shark repellent has been studied to test its effectiveness and to more accurately estimate dose sizes, concentrations and time to recovery. Tonic immobility can also be used as a form of mild anesthesia during experimental manipulations of sharks.

Scientists also believe that tonic immobility can be a stressful experience for sharks. By measuring blood chemistry samples when the shark is immobile, it has been suggested that tonic immobility can actually put stress on the shark, and reduce breathing efficiency. Others think sharks have a series of compensatory mechanisms that work to increase respiration rates and lower stress.

It has been observed that orcas can exploit sharks' tonic immobility to prey on large sharks. Some orcas ram sharks from the side to stun them, then flip the sharks to induce tonic immobility and keep them in such state for sustained time. For some sharks, this prevents water from flowing through their gills and the result can be fatal.

==== Teleost fishes ====
Goldfish, trout, rudd, tench, brown bullhead, medaka, paradise fish, and topminnow have been reported to go limp when they are restrained on their backs. Oscars seem to go into shock when they are stressed (when their aquarium is being cleaned, for example): they lie on their side, stop moving their fins, start to breathe more slowly and deeply, and lose colour. A similar behavior has been reported for convict tangs in the field.

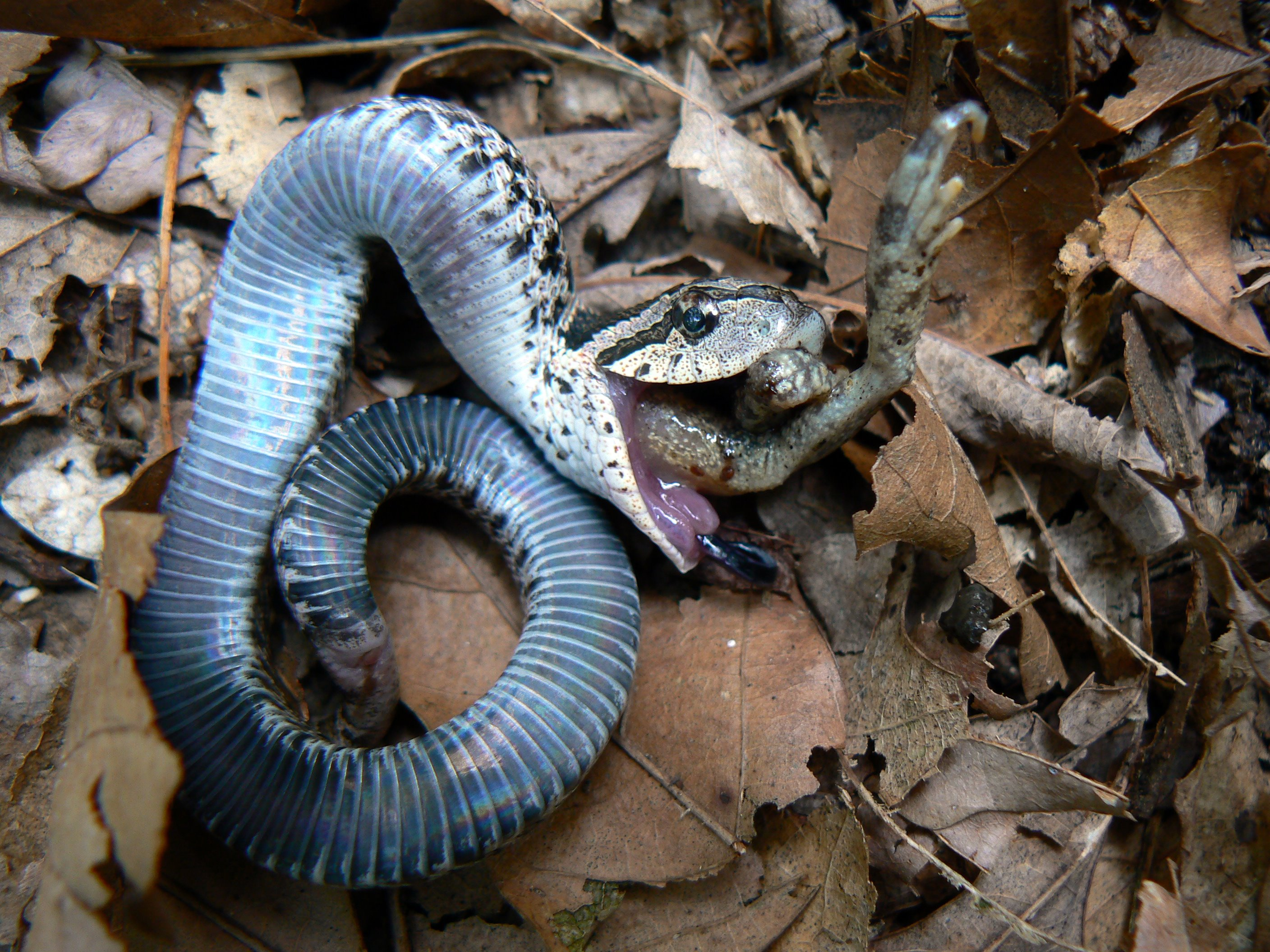
An eastern hog-nosed snake playing dead and regurgitating a toad

==== Amphibians and reptiles ====
Tonic immobility can be found in several families of anurans (frogs and toads). In anurans, tonic immobility is demonstrated most often with open eyes and the limbs sprawled and easy to move, but some species keep their eyes closed. Some species also protrude their tongue.

Tonic immobility has also been observed in several species of lizards and snakes. The most common example of tonic immobility in the latter is the North American hog-nose snake, but it has also been observed in grass snakes. Tonic immobility can be reliably induced in iguanas by a combination of inversion, restraint and moderate pressure. During tonic immobility, there are obvious changes in respiration including a decline in respiration rate, the rhythm becomes sporadic, and the magnitude irregular. The prolonged period of tonic immobility does not seem to be consistent with the fear hypothesis, but could be the result of a period of cortical depression due to increased brain stem activity.

Tonic immobility can also be induced in the Carolina anole. The characteristics of this tonic immobility vary as a function of the duration and condition of captivity. Tonic immobility is also observed in sea turtles.

==== Chickens ====
Tonic immobility can be induced in chickens, but the behavior is more colloquially referred to as hypnosis.

Tonic immobility can be induced in chickens through several means, including by gently restraining them on their side, stomach, or back for a short period of time, or by using chalk to draw a line on the ground away from the chicken's beak while restraining them with their head down. Chickens have been used in several studies to elucidate the genetic basis of tonic immobility. While early studies focused on determining whether tonic immobility was influenced by genetics, a study in 2019 identified five genes that potentially control tonic immobility in white leghorn chickens and red junglefowl.

==== Ducks ====
Tonic immobility has been observed in several species of ducks as an effective anti-predatory response. A study by Sargeant and Eberhardt (1975) determined that ducks who feigned death had a better chance at surviving a fox attack than those who resisted and struggled. Despite being immobile the ducks remained conscious and were aware of opportunities for escape. Although the researchers concluded that tonic immobility was an effective anti-predator response, they conceded that it would not be useful against predators that kill or fatally injure prey immediately after capture.

==== Rabbits ====
Tonic immobility occurs in both domestic and wild species of rabbit and can be induced by placing and restraining the animal for a short period of time. As in other prey animals, tonic immobility is considered to be an antipredator behavior in rabbits. Studies on tonic immobility in rabbits focus on the European rabbit Oryctolagus cuniculus, but other species of rabbit have been studied.

A laboratory experiment by Ewell, Cullen, and Woodruff (1981) provided support to the hypothesis that European rabbits use tonic immobility as an anti-predator response. The study found that how quickly the rabbits "righted" themselves (i.e. how quickly they came out of tonic immobility) depended on how far a predator was away from the rabbit, and how close the rabbit was to their home cage. Rabbits that were closer to their home cage righted themselves more quickly than those that were farther from their home cage. Conversely, when predators were closer to the rabbits, they took longer to right themselves. These results were consistent with those found in studies on chickens, lizards, and blue crabs at the time, and provided support that rabbits use tonic immobility as an antipredator response.

A more recent study on European rabbits monitored their heart rate during tonic immobility and found several physiological changes to the cardiovascular system during this state, including a decrease in heart rate.

==== Humans ====
Tonic immobility has been hypothesized to occur in humans undergoing intense trauma, including sexual assault.

There is also an increasing body of evidence that points to a positive contribution of tonic immobility in human functioning. Thus, defensive immobilization is hypothesized to have played a crucial role in the evolution of human parent-child attachment, sustained attention and suggestibility, REM sleep, and theory of mind.

== Induction ==
Tonic immobility is considered to be a fear-potentiated response induced by physical restraint and characterised by reduced responsiveness to external stimulation. It has been used as a measure in the assessment of animal welfare, particularly hens, since 1970. The rationale for the tonic immobility test is that the experimenter simulates a predator, thereby eliciting the anti-predator response. The precept is that the prey animal 'pretends' to be dead to be able to escape when/if the predator relaxes its concentration. Death-feigning birds often take advantage of escape opportunities; tonic immobility in quail reduces the probability of the birds being predated by cats.

To induce tonic immobility, the animal is gently restrained on its side or back for a period of time, e.g. 15 seconds. This is done either on a firm, flat surface or sometimes in a purpose-built V- or U-shaped restraining cradle. In rodents, the response is sometimes induced by additionally pinching or attaching a clamp to the skin at the nape of the neck. Scientists record behaviours such as the number of inductions (15-second restraining periods) required for the animal to remain still, the latency to the first major movements (often cycling motions of the legs), latency to first head or eye movements and the duration of immobility, sometimes called the 'righting time'.

Tonic immobility has been used to show that hens in cages are more fearful than those in pens, hens on the top tier of tiered battery cages are more fearful than those on the lower levels, hens carried by hand are more fearful than hens carried on a mechanical conveyor, and hens undergoing longer transportation times are more fearful than those undergoing transport of a shorter duration.

Tonic immobility as a scientific tool has also been used with mice, gerbils, guinea pigs, rats, rabbits, and pigs.

== See also ==
- Aggressive mimicry – Deceptive mimicry of a harmless species by a predator
- Anti-predator adaptation – Defensive feature of prey for selective advantage
- Autohaemorrhaging – Action of animals deliberately ejecting blood from their bodies
- Chicken hypnotism – Hypnosis of chickens
- Die-in – Form of protest
- Faked death – Leaving false evidence of one's own death
- Fight-or-flight response – Physiological reaction to a perceived threat or harmful event
- Freezing behavior – Reaction to specific stumuli
- REM sleep – Phase of sleep characterized by random and rapid eye movements
- Syncope (medicine) – Transient loss of consciousness and postural tone
- Tetrodotoxin – Neurotoxin which inhibits the flow of sodium into cells causing paralysis of muscles
- Thanatos – Ancient Greek personification of death
- Trout tickling – Method of fishing by hand
- Vasovagal response – Brief loss of consciousness due to a neurologically induced drop in blood pressure
