= U.F.O.s at the Zoo =

- Directed by: Wayne Coyne; Bradley Beesley; George Salisbury
- Release date: 2007

U.F.O.s at the Zoo is a DVD by The Flaming Lips. The film was co-directed by Wayne Coyne, Bradley Beesley and George Salisbury. It was recorded September 15, 2006 at the Zoo Amphitheater in Oklahoma City, OK.

== Track listing ==
1. "The Freaks Get Restless and Wake the Animals"
2. "The Mothership Descends"
3. "Race For the Prize"
4. "Free Radicals"
5. "Expecting Everyone's Head to Explode"
6. "Yoshimi Battles the Pink Robots"
7. "Yoshimi Battles the Pink Robots, Part 2"
8. "Should We Free the Animals?"
9. "Vein of Stars"
10. "Hotdog Eating Contest"
11. "The Yeah Yeah Yeah Song"
12. "The Spark That Bled"
13. "Preparing the U.F.O. Mothership"
14. "The W.A.N.D."
15. "My Cosmic Autumn Rebellion"
16. "Santas and Aliens"
17. "She Don't Use Jelly"
18. "Do You Realize??"
19. "How Much Red Duct Tape?"
20. "A Spoonful Weighs A Ton"
21. "Captain Blue Blur Splits The Audience"
22. "Love Yer Brain"
23. "The Mothership Departs"
24. "The Greatest Audience In The Galaxy..."

== Personnel ==
- Wayne Coyne – lead vocals, guitar, keyboards, theremin, bass
- Michael Ivins – bass, keyboards, backing vocals
- Steven Drozd – guitar, drums, percussion, keyboards, bass, backing vocals
- Kliph Scurlock - drums, percussion
