= JoLynn Garnes =

American film editor

- Occupation: Film editor

JoLynn Garnes is an American film editor. She has edited feature documentaries, music videos, and TV commercials.

Garnes's best-known work is the critically acclaimed documentary film The Fearless Freaks, about American rock band The Flaming Lips. Other documentary films edited by JoLynn include Summercamp! and All Dolled Up: A New York Dolls Story.

Garnes has also edited several music videos for artists including Beyoncé, Prince, Low, Mojave 3, Hilary Duff, Bon Iver, and The Flaming Lips.
