= The Fearless Freaks =

2005 film

Fearless Freaks is a 2005 documentary directed by Bradley Beesley and edited by JoLynn Garnes, chronicling the alternative rock band The Flaming Lips. While the film features cameo appearances by such actors as Adam Goldberg and Christina Ricci, most of the screen time is taken up by interviews with the band members and their families interspersed with clips of the band's recording sessions and live performances. Wayne Coyne's mother and several of his brothers are prominently featured, as are members of Steven Drozd's family, while Michael Ivins' family receives comparatively little screen time.

The film traces the band from their roots as a local psychedelic punk band to an internationally renowned band that draws celebrities to its performances. Many of the interviews were filmed in the band's hometown of Oklahoma City, although Wayne Coyne is the only band member still living there. In addition to the development of the Lips' music and performance, another theme running through the movie is the effect that drugs have had on the band and their families. A notable scene in the film depicts Steven Drozd preparing to inject himself with heroin, and it is stated that paranoia over Drozd's addiction caused guitarist Ronald Jones to leave the band. Drugs have also affected the lives of members of both Drozd's and Coyne's families.

== Cast ==
- Wayne Coyne – Himself
- Steven Drozd – Himself
- Michael Ivins – Himself
- Bradley Beesley – Narrator
- Beck – Himself
- Niels Rasmussen – Poul Power
- Steve Burns – Himself
- Jonathan Donahue – Himself
- Adam Goldberg – Himself
- Gibby Haynes of the Butthole Surfers – Himself
- Juliette Lewis – Herself
- Tyson Meade & Trent Bell of The Chainsaw Kittens
- Kelly Peterson – Fan with camera at Coachella
- Liz Phair – Herself
- "Chan" Marshall (Cat Power) – Herself
- Christina Ricci – Herself
- Jack White – Himself
- Meg White – Herself

== Reception ==
On review aggregator website Rotten Tomatoes, the film holds an approval rating of 100% based on 12 reviews, with an average rating of 7.4/10.
