= Okie Noodling =

2001 film by Bradley Beesley

- Directed by: Bradley Beesley
- Production company: Redline Entertainment
- Release date: 2001
- Running time: 57 minutes
- Country: United States
- Language: English

Okie Noodling is a 2001 documentary film examining the practice of handfishing in rural Oklahoma.

== Plot ==
The film documents "noodling", the practice of wading in murky water and reaching into dark holes in the attempt to catch a catfish, a dangerous practice that often causes noodlers to lose fingers and toes. The method is hundreds of years old, and the documentary also examines the subculture surrounding handfishing,

The film depicts noodling as believed to have originated with white settlers, with at least one reference dating from 1775. Most evidence suggests that Native Americans typically only fished using tools such as spears and cages.

== Music ==
The soundtrack for Okie Noodling is performed by The Flaming Lips and was written specifically for the film.
