= Noodling =

Fishing for catfish using only bare hands

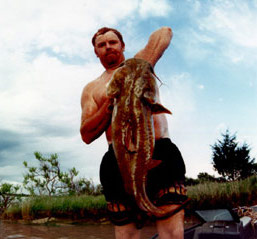
A man with a fish caught by noodling

Map of the US states where noodling is legal in some form

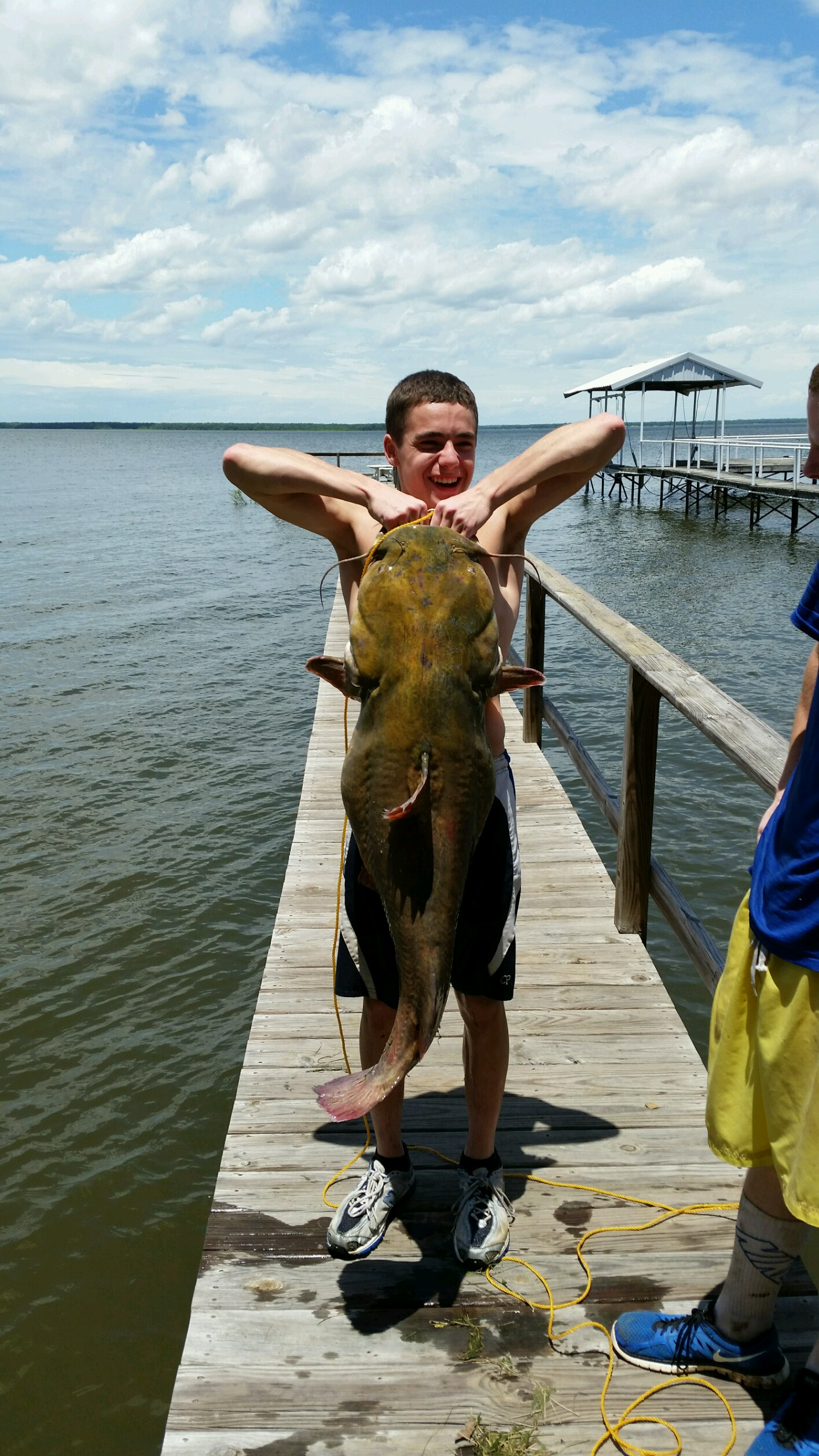
60 lb (27 kg) catfish caught by noodling in 2015

Noodling is fishing for catfish using one's bare hands or feet, and is practiced primarily in the southern United States. The noodler places their hand or foot inside a discovered catfish hole in order to catch the fish. Other names for the same activity are used in different regions, primarily in the South and Midwest, and include hogging, dogging, grappling, grabbling, tickling, and catfisting.

The term "noodling", although today used primarily towards the capture of flathead catfish, can and has been applied to all hand fishing methods, regardless of the method or species of fish sought. The origin of the term is unknown. Noodling as a term has also been applied to various unconventional methods of fishing, such as any which do not use bait, rod and reel, speargun, etc., but this usage is much less common. The term has also been applied to the similar capture of snapping turtles.

Due to concerns over the safety of noodlers and sustainability of fish populations, the technique is illegal in some states where it was once traditionally practiced. As of 2002, it was legal in some form in fourteen states, sometimes with restrictions on the species or sizes of fish, and on the specific methods that may be employed: Alabama, Arkansas, Georgia, Illinois, Kansas, Kentucky, Louisiana, Maryland, Mississippi, North Carolina, Oklahoma, South Carolina, Tennessee, and Wisconsin. It has since been legalized in Texas and West Virginia.

== Method ==
Although the concept of catching fish with only the use of the arm or foot in the water is simple, the process of noodling is more complicated. The choice of catfish as the prey is not arbitrary, but comes from the circumstances of their habitat. During the spawn, catfish will dig or enter a hole underneath a structure submerged in the water. The female will lay the eggs in the hole and the male will guard the eggs. When the eggs become fry, they will leave and the male will also leave the hole. To begin, a noodler goes underwater to depths ranging from only a few feet to twenty feet (6 m) and places their hand inside a discovered catfish hole. If all goes as planned, the catfish will swim forward and latch onto the fisherman's hand, usually as a defensive maneuver, in order to try to escape the hole. If the fish is particularly large, the noodler can hook the hand around its gills.

Noodlers often have spotters who help them bring the catfish in, either to shore or to their boat; noodling in pairs is considered important for safety, and also makes it a more social activity, with noodling partners often forming long-term partnerships.

The Oklahoma lake record catfish that was caught by noodling weighed 87.85 pounds (39.85 kg), was 53 3/4 inches (137 cm) long, and 38 1/4 inches (97 cm) in girth. A typical weight for a flathead catfish caught by noodling is 40 lb (18 kg).

== In popular culture ==
"Noodling" is one name used for fishing with one's hands or feet, but there are other names for it that are derived from different cultures. The activity is most common in the southern and midwestern United States.

It has been featured or referred to in various television programs, including Late Night with David Letterman (1989), Okie Noodling, which was televised in two-parts on PBS (2001), Dirty Jobs on the Discovery Channel (2003), River Monsters on Animal Planet (2012), and Mudcats (2012) on the History Channel. It also received media attention in the American sitcom Cougar Town, and in the animated sitcoms, King of the Hill episode "The Redneck on Rainey Street", and the 12th episode of Ben 10: Omniverse, "Gone Fishin". An episode of Bon Appétit's YouTube series titled "It's Alive" (2019) featured Brad Leone and Matty Matheson noodling.

Noodling was also featured in the 2009 movie Leaves of Grass with Keri Russell as a noodler, in the 2009 film Fish Tank, and in the 2016 movie Deepwater Horizon.

The Noodler's brand of fountain pen ink was named in reference to noodling, described as "a southern sport that attempts to equalize the struggle between man and animal in the quest for a sense of fair play", and included bottles of ink with images of catfish on the label.

== Dangers ==
Other than drowning, or being injured by underwater hazards, noodlers face other physical threats, including the potential for fatal injury caused by other forms of aquatic life that may be residing in the abandoned holes of cavity spawning catfish, such as snapping turtles, snakes, beavers, and alligators. Loose fitting clothes may get tangled or snagged on roots or rocks, and various physical injuries may be incurred while underwater, ranging anywhere from superficial wounds to losing fingers. Several articles suggest precautionary measures, such as using the buddy system, wearing tight clothing that hugs the skin, and inspecting potential holes with a stick. Other recommendations include noodling shirtless or while wearing a short sleeve shirt, to wear gloves that offer some level of protection for one's hands, and to not wear any jewelry.

The mortality rate per capita for noodling indicates that it is extremely dangerous in comparison to other forms of fishing. Noodling related deaths have been reported.

== See also ==
- Hillbilly Handfishin' – Television reality show about noodling
- Okie Noodling – 2001 film by Bradley Beesley
- Trout tickling – Method of fishing by hand
