= Trout tickling =

Method of fishing by hand

An illustrated image demonstrating trout tickling.

Trout tickling is the art of rubbing the underbelly of a trout with fingers. If done properly, the trout will go into a trance after a minute or so, and can then easily be retrieved and thrown onto the nearest bit of dry land.

== History ==
Trout tickling has been evidently practiced for many centuries, if not since time immemorial. It is mentioned in Shakespeare's comedy Twelfth Night, where it is used as a metaphor for bamboozlement by Olivia's servant Maria, who is about to play a vengeful prank on the pompous steward, Malvolio:

Close, in the name of jesting! Lie thou there,
for here comes the trout that must be caught with tickling.

The technique was a common practice used by boys, poachers and working men in times of economic stress, particularly during the 1930s Great Depression era. Poachers using the method required no nets, rods or lines or any other incriminating equipment if apprehended by the police or gamekeepers.

Thomas Martindale's 1901 book, Sport, Indeed, describes the method used on trout in the River Wear in County Durham:

The fish are watched working their way up the shallows and rapids. When they come to the shelter of a ledge or a rock it is their nature to slide under it and rest. The poacher sees the edge of a fin or the moving tail, or maybe he sees neither; instinct, however, tells him a fish ought to be there, so he takes the water very slowly and carefully and stands up near the spot. He then kneels on one knee and passes his hand, turned with fingers up, deftly under the rock until it comes in contact with the fish's tail. Then he begins tickling with his forefinger, gradually running his hand along the fish's belly further and further toward the head until it is under the gills. Then comes a quick grasp, a struggle, and the prize is wrenched out of his natural element, stunned with a blow on the head, and landed in the pocket of the poacher.

An illustrated image demonstrating the practice of noodling.Noodling is a method of catching catfish by using your body as bait. The technique is illegal in some U.S. states where it was once traditionally practiced.

In Scotland the technique is more often called "guddling" or sometimes "ginniling". The practice is currently illegal under most circumstances in Britain. A related method of catching catfish by hand is called noodling in the United States.

== In history and fiction ==
Trout tickling has an ancient history. Aelian, a Greek writer of about 230 A.D., writes in his De Natura Animalium (as published in England in 1565): "If men wade into the sea, when the water is low, end stroking the fish nestling in the pools, suddenly lay hands upon and secure them." While in Francis Beaumont and John Fletcher's Rule a Wife and Have a Wife, a ribald comedy dating from 1624, Estifania remarks "Here comes another trout that I must tickle, / And tickle daintily".

The technique is also mentioned in several of Shakespeare's plays: in Twelfth Night, the servant Maria refers to the approach of the hated Malvolio, head of Olivia's household, with the words "for here comes the trout that must be caught with tickling" (Act 2, Scene 5). Maria and others are conspiring to trap Malvolio into acting foolishly by forging a love letter from Olivia.

Trout tickling is also mentioned in later works: Mark Twain wrote about catching catfish in a similar manner while mentioning that salmon and certain other species can also be lured and caught in this way. Arthur Ransome's novel The Picts and the Martyrs contains a detailed description of the technique by a young boy from the English Lake District. It is also described as a poaching method in Roald Dahl's classic novel Danny, the Champion of the World, in Linda Buckley-Archer's science fiction novel Gideon the Cutpurse, in Robert A. Heinlein's fantasy novel Glory Road, and in the video game Theme Hospital as a hobby of many of the staff for hire. Terry Pratchett's 2003 young adult novel The Wee Free Men opens with young Tiffany Aching amusing herself by tickling trout.

An interview conducted by CSV/BBC NI's Brian Morgan, Story of the Virgin Soldier, for the BBC's WW2 Peoples War project, reports how one soldier, Robert McIlroy, impressed his senior commanders by 'tickling trout' out of the river in order for fellow soldiers to eat.

In the book The White Mountains by John Christopher, one of the party members (Henry) attempts to tickle trout unsuccessfully in an attempt to forage food for the group.

In an episode of The Waltons ("The Search", S. 4, E.15), Olivia, Jim Bob, and Elizabeth set out to visit a friend but become lost on Walton's Mountain, and while lost Jim Bob catches fish using this method which he had learned from Grandpa.

In an episode of Auf Wiedersehen, Pet ("Another Country", S. 2, E.4), Oz successfully tickles trout before being caught by a gamekeeper.

In an episode of The Gentlemen characters Lady Charlotte 'Charly' Horniman and Geoffrey Seacombe discuss her childhood and how she learned to tickle salmon.

== See also ==
- Chicken hypnotism – Hypnosis of chickens
- Noodling – Fishing for catfish using only bare hands
- Apparent death – Animals playing dead
