= Shrimp fishing on horse back in Oostduinkerke =

Type of shrimp fishing in Belgium

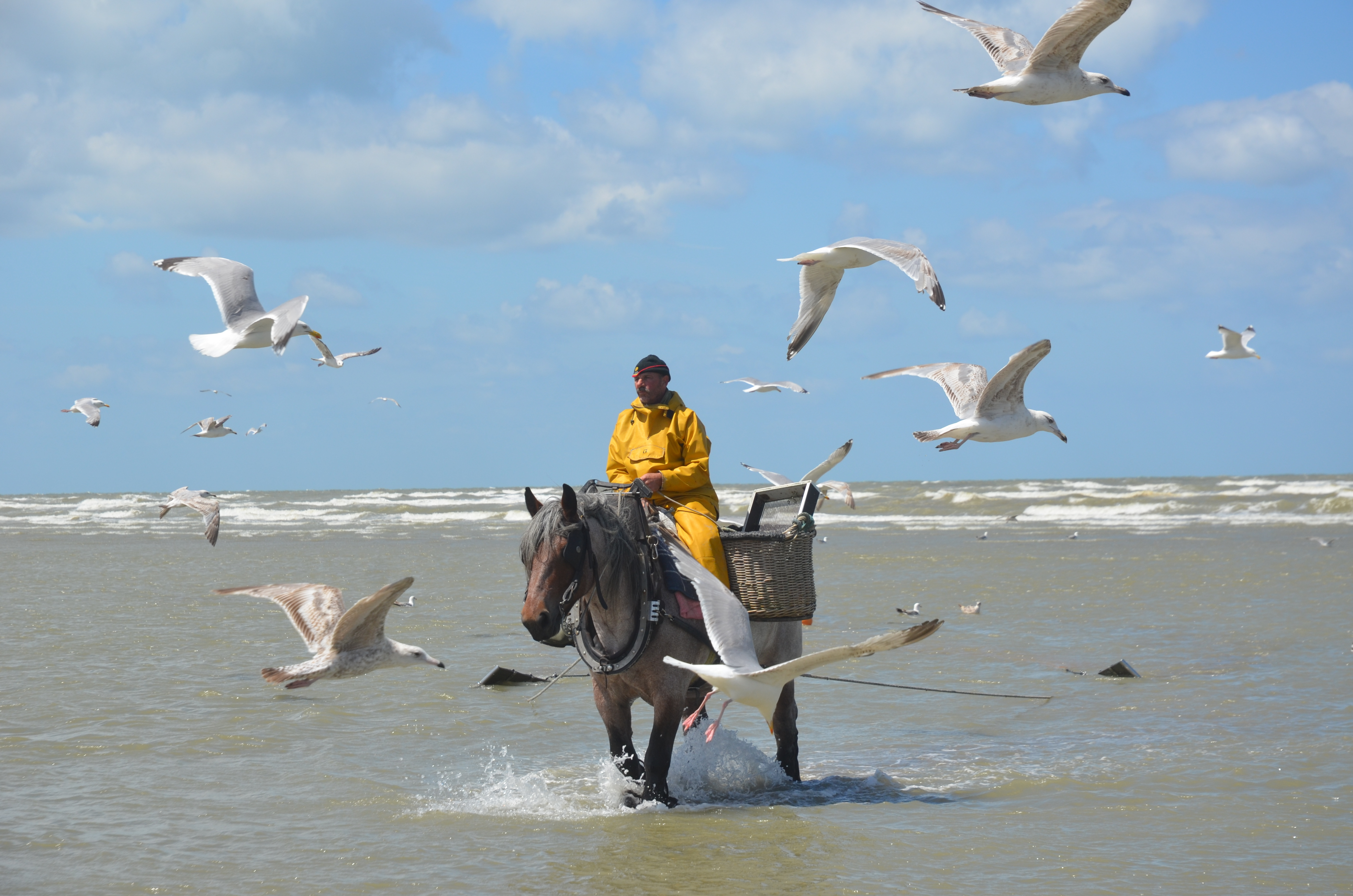
A shrimp fisherman on his horse

Shrimp fishing on horseback in Oostduinkerke is a traditional fishing method practiced in the coastal town of Oostduinkerke, a region of West Flanders, Belgium. It involves fishermen, known as paardenvissers (lit. 'horsefishers'), riding sturdy Belgian draft horses into the shallow waters of the North Sea to catch brown shrimp (Crangon crangon) using large, funnel-shaped nets. This practice, which dates back several centuries, is unique in the world and has been recognized on the Representative List of the Intangible Cultural Heritage of Humanity by UNESCO in 2013. This tradition includes a two-day Shrimp Festival in which the locals build floats, prepare street theatre, and make costumes.

The technique relies on the horses to disturb the sandy seabed, causing shrimp to leap into the nets. Fishermen, clad in waterproof gear, guide the horses along the shoreline while monitoring the catch. The tradition, once widespread along the Belgian and northern French coasts, has survived in Oostduinkerke due to strong community efforts and cultural preservation initiatives.

Today, shrimp fishing on horseback is both a livelihood and a cultural attraction, drawing visitors who witness demonstrations and taste freshly prepared shrimp. It remains an important symbol of Belgian maritime heritage and is actively passed down through generations of local fishing families.

== History ==
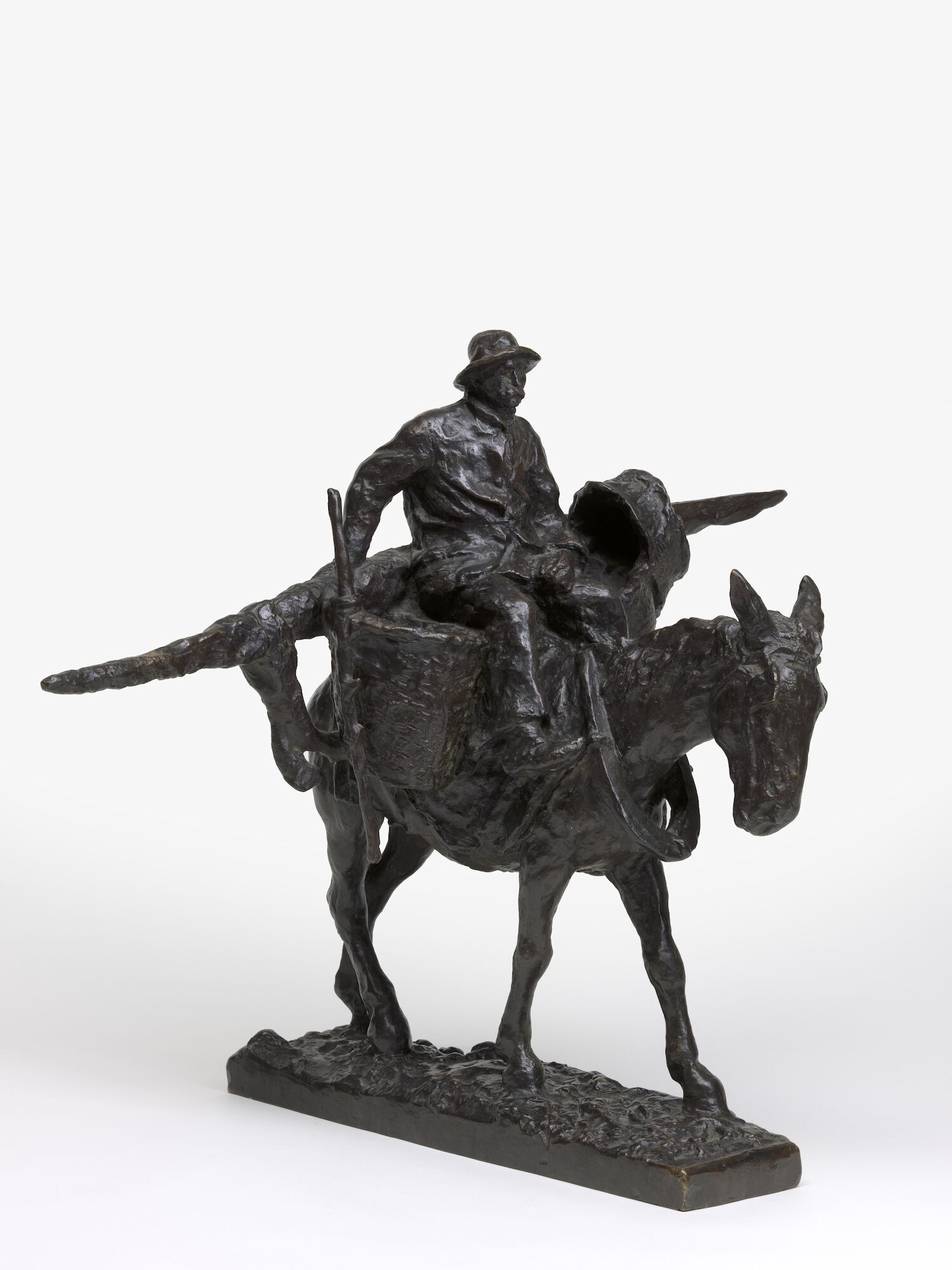
Shrimp fisherman on mule by Franz Courtens (NAVIGO National Fisheries Museum)

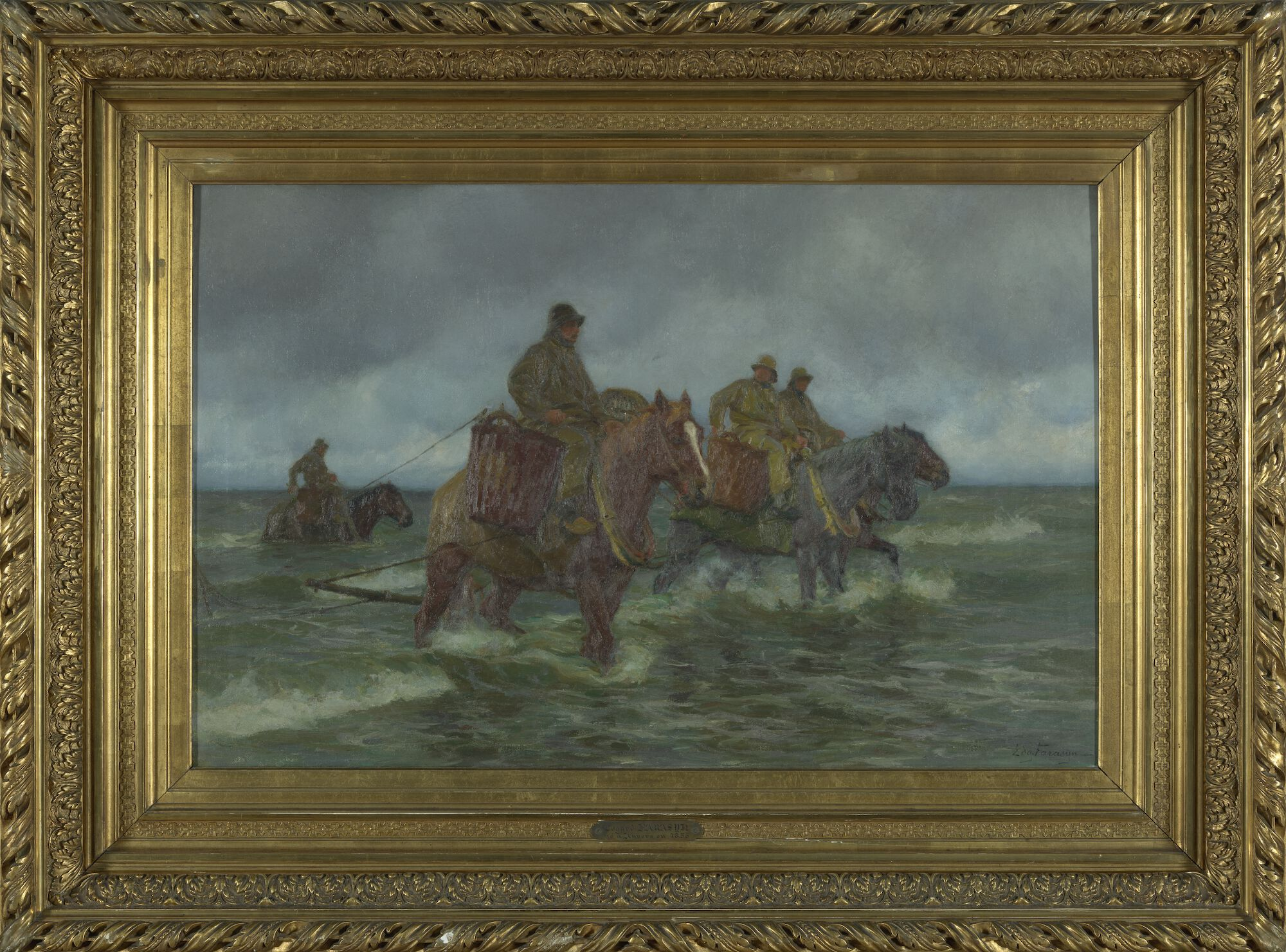
Horse fishermen at sea by Edgard Farasyn

Shrimp fishing on horse back was practiced by families on the North Sea coast including Germany, England, and France since the 16th century to after the Second World War. While economies improved, coastal farmer-fishermen disappeared. Oostduinkerke, a Flemish community in Belgium where an 8,500 people live, is the only place where the tradition is still alive today. For centuries, the tradition has been passed down from fathers to sons. Today, there are thirteen households in Oostduinkerke, represented by fifteen men and two women, actively engaging in shrimp fishing and each has their own speciality.

== Shrimp fishing ==
Except in the winter months, the fishermen take horses out to the sea during low tide a few times a week. The whole procedure takes three hours, in the 90 minutes up to and 90 minutes after the low tide. The horses walk parallel to the coast, going into the water as deep as their chests. A funnel-shape net, about seven by ten metres (23 ft × 33 ft), is held open by two lateral planks. As this process requires a huge pulling power, Brabant draught horses are used for this. A chain drags over the sand and causes shock waves. This causes the shrimp to jump and be caught in the net. Every half hour, fishermen go back to the beach, empty the net, and sift their catch. The shrimp are placed in baskets that hang on either side of the horse. After fishing, the shrimp are boiled in fresh water.

== Shrimp Festival ==
The annual two-day shrimp festival is held in each June. The locals spend months to prepare floats, costumes, and a parade to attract about 10,000 international visitors. On the first day, a shrimp-catching competition among the horse fishers is organized. The winner rides first in the parade next day. The festival began in 1950 by the mayor of Koksijde, Honoré Loones. Koksijde is Oostuinkerke's neighbouring town. The intent was to save horseback shrimp fishing from extinction by making it a tourist attraction. The festival and public demonstrations in summer months has been partly subsidized by the municipality since then. The demonstrations takes around 45 minutes. They are annually organized from April to September. The calendar can be accessed through the official website of the Koksijde municipality.
