= Pat Buchanan 1996 presidential campaign =

American political campaign

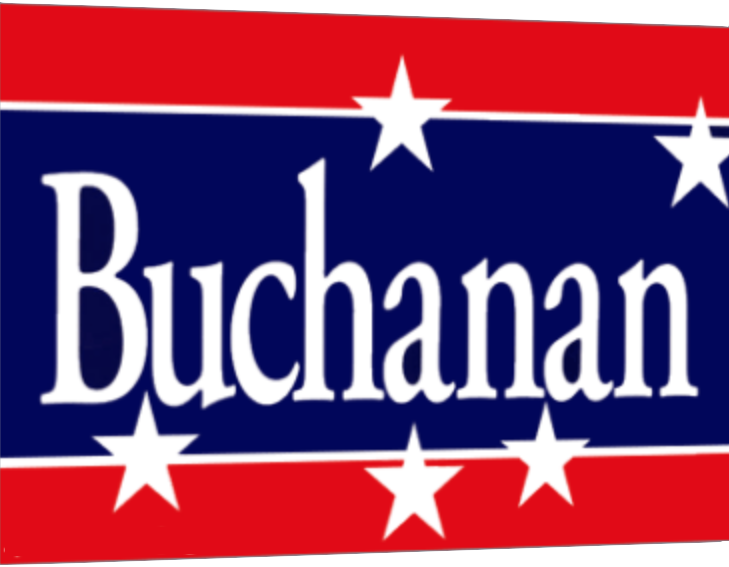
- Candidate: Pat Buchanan; White House Communications Director (1985-1987)
- Affiliation: Republican
- Announced: February 1995
- Suspended: August 1996
- Slogan: Go Pat Go

In 1996, Pat Buchanan, an American author and political commentator, sought the Republican Party (GOP) nomination for the 1996 United States presidential election. He lost the nomination to Bob Dole, who lost the general election.

Buchanan had run for the nomination in 1992, but lost to George H.W. Bush. After the 1996 election, Buchanan associated with the Reform Party, and successfully became that party's nomination for the 2000 presidential election; he again lost the general election.

== Background ==
Pat Buchanan was an aide to presidents Richard Nixon, Gerald Ford, and Ronald Reagan. Meanwhile, he became an author and political commentator on TV and radio. He was a "harsh critic" of President George H.W. Bush during his term, and in 1992, Buchanan ran for the Republican nomination in the 1992 presidential election, against him. Bush ultimately won the nomination. Buchanan received 23% of the primary vote.

== Campaign ==
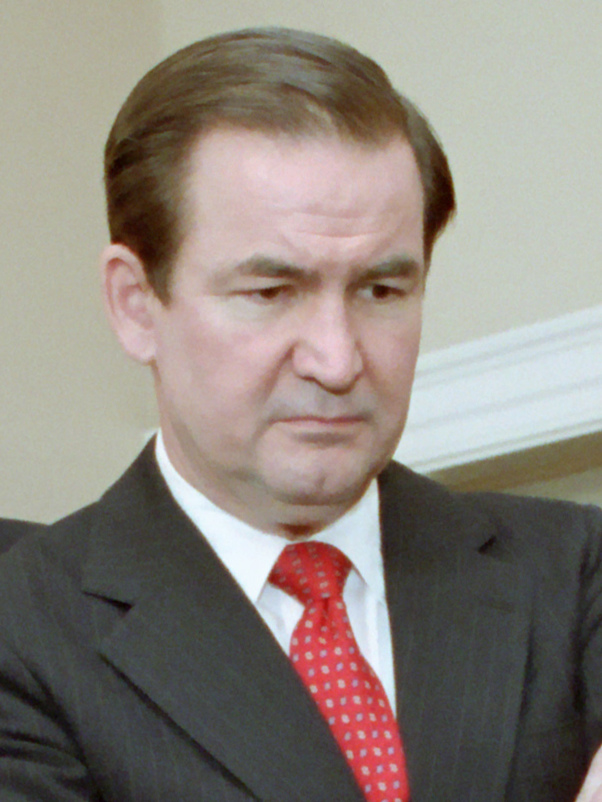
Buchanan in 1986

Gold denotes a state won by Buchanan.

Pat Buchanan announced his campaign in February 1995. The Christian Science Monitor wrote that he "has highlighted an ideological schism within the GOP at a time when the party would rather be closing ranks to defeat President Clinton." He used "blunt, memorable" populist and nativist language and divided the right wing, especially because of his opposition to free trade economic policies like NAFTA which many conservatives supported. Britannica writes: "Buchanan criticized U.S. attempts to broker peace in the world and what he saw as the undue influence of Israel on U.S. foreign policy. He advocated [for] a temporary moratorium on immigration. He decried the feminist and homosexual rights movements and was adamantly opposed to abortion. He denounced as futile Republican attempts to win elections by moving toward the middle of the political spectrum." He also wanted the U.S. stop giving foreign countries aid and take American soldiers out of Bosnia, saying American troops should be sent to the U.S.-Mexico border instead.

After being compared ideologically to Ku Klux Klan member David Duke, Buchanan disavowed Duke and removed a campaign adviser who had ties to him.

Buchanan made opposition to concentrated animal feeding operations and intensive pig farming a central theme of his campaign in Iowa, citing opposition by Iowa family farmers. He placed second in the Iowa caucus, receiving 23% of the vote and establishing himself as a serious challenger to frontrunner Bob Dole.

Buchanan won the New Hampshire primary, receiving 27% of the vote, compared to Dole at 26% and former Tennessee Governor Lamar Alexander at 23%. Buchanan had difficulty later on. He continued his campaign until August 1996, and did not endorse Bob Dole, who won the nomination but later lost the general election. He encouraged his supporters not to leave the Republican Party.

Buchanan received 20% of the primary vote or 3,184,943 votes and 4 states (Alaska, Louisiana, New Hampshire, Missouri).

== Endorsements ==
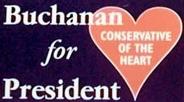
A sticker promoting Buchanan's 1996 campaign

- William P. Clark, Jr., Associate Justice of the California Supreme Court (1973–1981), 6th United States Deputy Secretary of State (1981–1982), 11th United States National Security Advisor (1982–1983), 44th United States Secretary of the Interior (1983–1985)
- Governor Mike Foster of Louisiana
- State Senator Dick Mountjoy of California
- Former U.S. National Security Advisor Richard Allen
- Former Governor Evan Mecham of Arizona
- Future Arizona state senator Karen Johnson (1997-2008)
- Roger Milliken, CEO of Milliken & Company
- Mark DeMoss, president of The DeMoss Group
- Judie Brown, president of the American Life League
- Larry Pratt, executive director of Gun Owners of America, and a former member of the Virginia House of Delegates (1980–1982).
- Charley Reese, conservative columnist for the Orlando Sentinel (1971–2001)
- Lewis Tambs, United States Ambassador to Colombia (1983–1985), United States Ambassador to Costa Rica (1985–1987)
- Paul Gottfried, paleoconservative political philosopher, historian, and writer
- Donald Wildmon, chairman of the American Family Association
- Tom Monaghan, CEO of Domino's Pizza
- Nackey Loeb, publisher for the conservative Manchester Union Leader newspaper
- Barbara Coe, chairwoman of the California Coalition for Immigration Reform
- Michael Farris, founder of the Home School Legal Defense Association (HSLDA) and Patrick Henry College
- David Duke, 1988 and 1992 presidential candidate
- William Luther Pierce, founder of the National Alliance, author of The Turner Diaries,

== Results ==
Date (daily totals)	Total pledged delegates	Contest	Delegates won and popular vote
Date (daily totals)	Total pledged delegates	Contest	Pat Buchanan
January 29	20	Alaska caucus	7; 2,991 (32%)
February 12	25	Iowa caucus	6; 22,578 (23%)
February 20	16	New Hampshire primary	4; 56,874 (27%)
February 24	13	Delaware primary	3; 6,118 (19%)
February 27 (78)	38	Arizona primary	12; 95,742 (27%)
February 27 (78)	20	North Dakota primary	4; 11,653 (18%)
February 27 (78)	20	South Dakota primary	7; 19,780 (29%)
March 2 (58)	38	South Carolina primary	11; 80,824 (29%)
March 2 (58)	20	Wyoming caucus	5; 181 (18%)
March 3	20	Puerto Rico primary	844 (0%)
March 5 (Super Tuesday) (252)	28	Colorado primary	7; 53,376 (21%)
March 5 (Super Tuesday) (252)	28	Connecticut primary	5; 19,664 (15%)
March 5 (Super Tuesday) (252)	43	Georgia primary	13; 162,627 (29%)
March 5 (Super Tuesday) (252)	16	Maine primary	5; 16,478 (24%)
March 5 (Super Tuesday) (252)	34	Maryland primary	8; 53,585 (21%)
March 5 (Super Tuesday) (252)	40	Massachusetts primary	12; 71,688 (25%)
March 5 (Super Tuesday) (252)	34	Minnesota caucus	13; 9,353 (33%)
March 5 (Super Tuesday) (252)	16	Rhode Island primary	387 (3%)
March 5 (Super Tuesday) (252)	13	Vermont primary	2; 9,730 (17%)
March 7		New York primary	(15%)
March 9		Missouri caucus	(36%)
March 12		Florida primary	(18%)
March 12		Louisiana primary	(33%)
March 12		Mississippi primary	(26%)
March 12		Oklahoma primary	(22%)
March 12		Oregon primary	(21%)
March 12		Tennessee primary	(25%)
March 12		Texas primary	(21%)
March 19		Illinois primary	(23%)
March 19		Michigan primary	(34%)
March 19		Ohio primary	(22%)
March 19		Wisconsin primary	(34%)
March 26		California primary	(18%)
March 26		Nevada primary	(15%)
March 26		Washington primary	(21%)
April 23		Pennsylvania primary	(18%)
May 7		Washington D.C. primary	(9%)
May 7		Indiana primary	(19%)
May 7		North Carolina primary	(13%)
May 14		Nebraska primary	(10%)
May 14		West Virginia primary	(16%)
May 21		Arkansas primary	(23%)
May 28		Idaho primary	(22%)
May 28		Kentucky primary	(33%)
June 4		Alabama primary	(16%)
June 4		Montana primary	(24%)
June 4		New Jersey primary	(11%)
June 4		New Mexico primary	(8%)
Total			3,184,943 (20.8%)

== Aftermath ==
In October 1999, Buchanan left the Republican Party and became associated with the Reform Party. He successfully became their nomination for the 2000 presidential election, but lost the general election. Some commentators believe Buchanan's policies may have inspired those of Donald Trump.
