= 1996 Republican Party presidential primaries =

- January 29 to June 4, 1996

1,975 delegates (1,653 pledged and 322 unpledged) to the Republican National Convention 988 (majority) votes needed to win

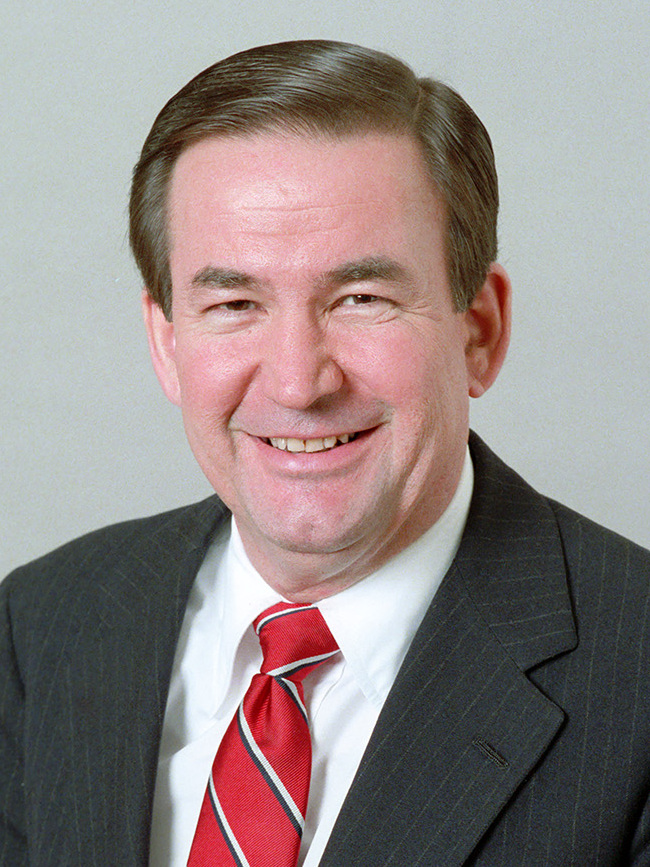

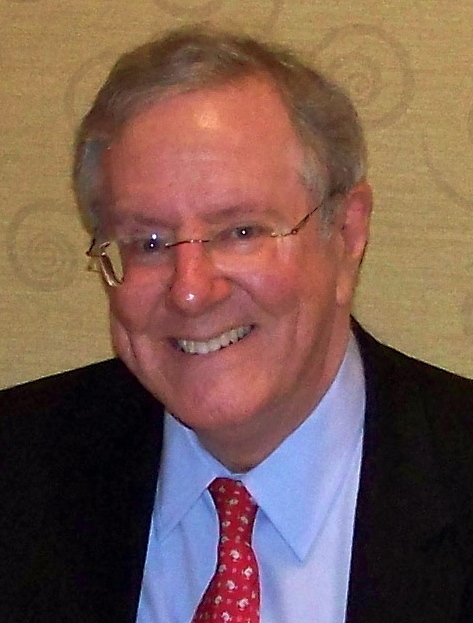
| Candidate | Bob Dole | Pat Buchanan | Steve Forbes |
| Home state | Kansas | Virginia | New Jersey |
| Delegate count | 1,437 | 101 | 51 |
| Contests won | 46 | 4 | 2 |
| Popular vote | 9,024,742 | 3,184,943 | 1,751,187 |
| Percentage | 58.8% | 20.8% | 11.4% |
- Gold denotes a state won by Pat Buchanan. Green denotes a state won by Steve Forbes. Purple denotes a state won by Bob Dole. Gray denotes a territory that did not hold a primary.
Previous Republican nominee
George H. W. Bush
Republican nominee
Bob Dole

From January 29 to June 4, 1996, voters of the Republican Party chose its nominee for president in the 1996 United States presidential election. Senator Bob Dole of Kansas, the former Senate majority leader and previous vice presidential nominee, was selected as the nominee through a series of primary elections and caucuses culminating in the 1996 Republican National Convention held from August 12 to 15, 1996, in San Diego, California. Dole resigned from the Senate in June 1996 once he became the presumptive nominee to concentrate on his presidential campaign. He chose Jack Kemp as his running mate.

Dole and Kemp went on to lose to President Bill Clinton and Vice President Al Gore by a severe margin, thereby making this the only Republican presidential primary within the span from 1968 to 2004 in which the Republican nominee had never been nor ever became president.

== Background ==
Following the 1994 midterm elections, many prominent candidates entered what would be a crowded field. This was expected as Democratic President Bill Clinton was unpopular in his first two years in office, eventually leading to the Republican Revolution. However, as Clinton became increasingly popular in his third year in office, several withdrew from the race or decided not to run.

Former president George H. W. Bush, who Clinton had defeated in 1992, opted not to seek the nomination, choosing instead to focus on his family life.

In February 1995, newly inaugurated Speaker of the House Newt Gingrich declined to run, despite urging from some members of the party's conservative wing.

Former U.S. Army Gen. Colin L. Powell was widely courted as a potential Republican nominee. However, on November 8, 1995, Powell announced that he would not seek the nomination.

Former Secretary of Defense Dick Cheney was touted by many as a possible candidate for the presidency, but he declared his intentions not to run in early 1995. Then-Texas Governor George W. Bush was also urged by some party leaders to seek the Republican Party nomination, but opted against doing so.

== Primary race overview ==
Going into the 1996 primary contest, Senate Majority Leader Bob Dole was widely seen as the front runner. Dole had significant name recognition, as he was a two-time presidential candidate – in 1980 and 1988, and Republican vice-presidential nominee in 1976. He was expected to win the nomination against underdog candidates such as the more conservative U.S. Senator Phil Gramm of Texas and more centrist U.S. Senator Arlen Specter of Pennsylvania. The fragmented field of candidates, which also included journalist and 1992 presidential candidate Pat Buchanan and magazine publisher Steve Forbes, debated issues such as a flat tax and other tax cut proposals, and a return to supply-side economic policies popularized by Ronald Reagan. Former Governor of Tennessee Lamar Alexander had promising showings in the early Iowa and New Hampshire primaries—finishing third in both contests behind only Dole and Buchanan—but his support dropped off in later primaries and he ultimately failed to win any state's delegates. (see "1996 Republican primary and caucus results" table below). Alan Keyes, who served as Reagan's Ambassador to the United Nations Economic and Social Council and Assistant Secretary of State for International Organization Affairs, was notable for being the only African American candidate in the race, but he ultimately failed to garner much support. More attention was drawn to the race by the budget stalemate in 1995 between the Congress and the President, which caused temporary shutdowns and slowdowns in many areas of federal government service.

On January 29, Buchanan won a non-binding straw poll in Alaska. Most pundits dismissed Buchanan's showing as insignificant. On February 6, Buchanan won the Louisiana caucus. Buchanan and Gramm had made several trips to the state to campaign. Gramm was expected to win, due to being from neighboring Texas and having the support of many of the Louisiana party regulars.

The candidates met in Des Moines for a Presidential Candidates Forum. Dole won the Iowa Caucus with 26% of the vote, a considerably smaller margin of victory than was expected.

Gramm's poor showing in Louisiana plus placing 5th in Iowa's caucuses resulted in his withdrawal from the contest on the Sunday before the New Hampshire primary.

In the New Hampshire Primary, Buchanan recorded a surprising victory over Dole, who finished in second place.

After some disappointing showings in Iowa and New Hampshire, Steve Forbes bounced back in the primaries in Delaware and Arizona. Forbes, along with Alan Keyes, were the only two candidates for the Republican nomination who campaigned in Delaware (According to R.W. Apple writing for The New York Times) "People in Delaware began calling their primary the Rodney Dangerfield election – it couldn't get any respect. That angered many local residents, like a woman at a Wilmington polling place this evening, who said that the New Hampshire officials who twisted the candidates' arms [into not coming to Delaware to campaign while the New Hampshire primary was ongoing] had ‘acted like little kids.’") giving Forbes an easy victory in the small state. "This state is the tax-cutting capital of the country and Steve Forbes got his tax-cutting message across" former Delaware Governor Pete du Pont said following the announcement of Forbes's victory. The bigger triumph for the Forbes campaign was in Arizona. Buchanan campaigned vigorously in Arizona in hopes of securing a crucial victory over Dole, with Buchanan even donning a cowboy costume while on the campaign trail. Faulty polling by the Dole campaign lured Dole into a false sense of security, making Dole think that the state would be an easy victory for him and he would not have to spend much time campaigning in Arizona. After the votes were counted, Buchanan finished a devastating third place, Dole was the runner-up, and Forbes pulled off a shocking, come-from-behind victory. Exit polls showed that Forbes's support came from those who voted for third-party candidate Ross Perot back in 1992, as well as from the large number of voters who cited "taxes" as the most important issue of the race and those who viewed Buchanan as too "extreme" and Dole as too moderate and "mainstream". Forbes would quickly lose the momentum he built up in Delaware and Arizona, but these back-to-back victories convinced many that Forbes was a serious contender.

Buchanan's and Forbes's early victories put Dole's expected front runner status in doubt during the formative months of the primary season. Although he lost Arizona, Dole had wins in North Dakota and South Dakota on the same day before looking to win in Wyoming and South Carolina, the latter being the first of the Southern states with a primary that was also three days before the multi-state primary Super Tuesday. Dole prevailed over Buchanan by 15 points, where exit polls showed Dole siphoning those identifying as part of the Christian right (that Buchanan anticipated having a large majority over) to go with voters who regarded Buchanan as either too extreme or not extreme. He proceeded to win the rest of the states, eventually giving him enough delegate commitments to claim status as the GOP presidential presumptive nominee.

Having collected only 21 percent of the total votes in Republican primaries and won four states, Buchanan suspended his campaign in March. He declared however that, if Dole were to choose a pro-choice running mate, he would run as the US Taxpayers Party (now Constitution Party) candidate. Forbes also withdrew in March having won only two states.

Dole resigned his Senate seat on June 11 to focus more intently on his presidential campaign. After becoming the nominee, Dole selected the former secretary of housing and urban development of the Bush administration, Jack Kemp, as his running mate.

== Candidates ==
=== Nominee ===
| Candidate | Most recent office | Home state | Campaign Withdrawal date | Popular vote | Contests won | Running mate |
|---|---|---|---|---|---|---|
| Bob Dole | U.S. Senator from Kansas (1968–1996) | Kansas | (Campaign); Secured nomination: March 19, 1996 | 9,024,742 (58.8%) | 46 | Jack Kemp |

=== Withdrew during convention or primaries ===
| Candidate | Experience | Home state | Campaign announced | Campaign suspended | Campaign | Popular vote | Contests won |
|---|---|---|---|---|---|---|---|
| Pat Buchanan | White House Communications Director (1985–1987) | Virginia | March 19, 1995 | | (Campaign) | 3,184,943 (20.8%) | 4 |
| Steve Forbes | Publisher and editor-in-chief of Forbes magazine (1990–) | New Jersey | September 21, 1995 | March 14, 1996 | Campaign | 1,751,187 (11.4%) | 2 |
| Lamar Alexander | United States Secretary of Education (1991–1993); Governor of Tennessee (1979–1987) | Tennessee | March 30, 1995 | March 9, 1996 (endorsed Dole) | Campaign | 495,590 (3.2%) | 0 |
| Morry Taylor | President of Titan International (1993-) | Michigan | September 2, 1995 | March 9, 1996 | Campaign | 21,180 (0.1%) | 0 |
| Richard Lugar | United States Senator from Indiana (1977–2013); Mayor of Indianapolis (1968–1976) | Indiana | April 19, 1995 | March 6, 1996 (endorsed Dole) | Campaign | 127,111 (0.8%) | 0 |
| Phil Gramm | United States Senator from Texas (1985–2002); United States Representative from Texas (1979–1985) | Texas | February 23, 1995 | February 14, 1996 (endorsed Dole) | Campaign | [data missing] | 0 |
| Bob Dornan | United States Representative from California (1977–1983, 1985–1997); Candidate for United States Senate in 1982 | California | April 13, 1995 | [data missing] | Campaign | [data missing] | 0 |
| Alan Keyes | Assistant Secretary of State for International Organization Affairs (1985–1987); Candidate for United States Senate in 1988 and 1992 | Maryland | March 26, 1995 | [data missing] | Campaign | [data missing] | 0 |

=== Withdrew before primary elections ===
| Candidate | Experience | Home state | Campaign announced | Campaign suspended | Campaign |
|---|---|---|---|---|---|
| Arlen Specter | United States Senator from Pennsylvania (1981–2011); District Attorney of Philadelphia (1966–1974) | Pennsylvania | March 31, 1995 | November 23, 1995 (endorsed Dole) | Campaign |
| Pete Wilson | Governor of California (1991–1999); United States Senator from California (1983–1991); Mayor of San Diego (1971–1983); California State Representative (1967–1971) | California | August 28, 1995 | September 29, 1995 | Campaign |
| Arthur Fletcher | Chair of the United States Commission on Civil Rights (1990–1993) | Washington D.C. | July 9, 1995 | [data missing] | [data missing] |

=== Minor candidates ===
- Retired engineer Jack Fellure from West Virginia
- Powerlifter and entrepreneur Shear'Ree from California

=== Formed exploratory committee but did not run ===
- Former Vice President Dan Quayle of Indiana
- Former Secretary of Defense Donald Rumsfeld of Illinois

=== Declined to run ===
- Former United States Senator Howard Baker from Tennessee
- Former United States Secretary of State James Baker from Texas
- Former United States Secretary of Education Bill Bennett
- Former President of the United States George H. W. Bush from Texas
- Governor George W. Bush from Texas
- Governor Marc Racicot from Montana
- Former Governor Carroll Campbell from South Carolina
- Former United States Secretary of Defense Dick Cheney from Wyoming
- Former Governor Pete du Pont from Delaware
- Governor John Engler from Michigan
- Former President of the United States Gerald Ford from California
- Speaker of the United States House Newt Gingrich from Georgia
- Former Governor Tom Kean from New Jersey
- Former United States Secretary of Labor Lynn Morley Martin from Illinois
- United States Senator John McCain from Arizona
- Retired United States Marine Corps Colonel Oliver North from Virginia
- Retired Chairman of the Joint Chiefs of Staff Colin Powell
- Televangelist Pat Robertson from Virginia
- Former United States Senator Warren Rudman from New Hampshire
- Governor Tommy Thompson from Wisconsin
- Businessman Donald Trump from New York
- Governor Bill Weld from Massachusetts
- Governor Christine Todd Whitman from New Jersey

== Results ==
| Date (daily totals) | Total pledged delegates | Contest | Delegates won and popular vote | | | | | Total |
| Date (daily totals) | Total pledged delegates | Contest | Bob Dole | Pat Buchanan | Steve Forbes | Lamar Alexander | Others | Total |
|---|---|---|---|---|---|---|---|---|
| January 29 | 20 | Alaska caucus | 3; 1,569 (17%) | 7; 2,991 (32%) | 6; 2,822 (31%) | 53 (1%) | 4; 1,806 (19%) | 9,241 |
| February 6 | 21 | Louisiana caucus | – | 13 (44%) | – | – | 8 (Note: Eight delegates were awarded to Phil Gramm.) (46%) | |
| February 12 | 25 | Iowa caucus | 7; 25,461 (26%) | 6; 22,578 (23%) | 2; 9,861 (10%) | 4; 17,052 (18%) | 6; 21,810 (21%) | 96,762 |
| February 20 | 16 | New Hampshire primary | 4; 54,738 (26%) | 4; 56,874 (27%) | 2; 25,505 (12%) | 4; 47,148 (22%) | 2; 24,478 (9%) | 208,743 |
| February 24 | 13 | Delaware primary | 4; 8,909 (27%) | 3; 6,118 (19%) | 5; 10,709 (33%) | 2; 4,375 (13%) | 2,662 (12%) | 32,773 |
| February 27 (78) | 38 | Arizona primary | 12; 102,980 (30%) | 12; 95,742 (27%) | 14; 115,962 (33%) | 24,765 (7%) | 8,033 (2%) | 347,482 |
| February 27 (78) | 20 | North Dakota primary | 9; 26,832 (42%) | 4; 11,653 (18%) | 4; 12,455 (20%) | 4,008 (6%) | 3; 8,786 (13%) | 63,734 |
| February 27 (78) | 20 | South Dakota primary | 10; 30,918 (45%) | 7; 19,780 (29%) | 3; 8,831 (13%) | 6,037 (9%) | 3,604 (4%) | 69,170 |
| March 2 (58) | 38 | South Carolina primary | 18; 124,904 (45%) | 11; 80,824 (29%) | 5; 35,039 (13%) | 4; 28,647 (10%) | 7,327 (2%) | 276,741 |
| March 2 (58) | 20 | Wyoming caucus | 10; 370 (40%) | 5; 181 (18%) | 5; 161 (17%) | 66 (7%) | 61 (7%) | 839 |
| March 3 | 20 | Puerto Rico primary | 20; 233,743 (98%) | 844 (0%) | 1,078 (0%) | 1,273 (0%) | 1,604 (0%) | 238,541 |
| March 5 (Super Tuesday) (252) | 28 | Colorado primary | 14; 108,123 (43%) | 7; 53,376 (21%) | 7; 51,592 (21%) | 24,184 (10%) | 10,655 (5%) | 247,930 |
| March 5 (Super Tuesday) (252) | 28 | Connecticut primary | 17; 70,998 (54%) | 5; 19,664 (15%) | 6; 26,253 (20%) | 6,985 (5%) | 6,518 (3%) | 130,418 |
| March 5 (Super Tuesday) (252) | 43 | Georgia primary | 18; 226,732 (41%) | 13; 162,627 (29%) | 6; 71,276 (13%) | 6; 75,855 (14%) | 21,916 (3%) | 558,406 |
| March 5 (Super Tuesday) (252) | 16 | Maine primary | 9; 31,147 (46%) | 5; 16,478 (24%) | 3; 9,991 (15%) | 4,450 (7%) | 5,214 (5%) | 67,280 |
| March 5 (Super Tuesday) (252) | 34 | Maryland primary | 21; 135,522 (53%) | 8; 53,585 (21%) | 5; 32,207 (13%) | 14,061 (6%) | 18,871 (6%) | 254,246 |
| March 5 (Super Tuesday) (252) | 40 | Massachusetts primary | 22; 135,946 (48%) | 12; 71,688 (25%) | 6; 39,605 (14%) | 21,456 (8%) | 16,138 (4%) | 284,833 |
| March 5 (Super Tuesday) (252) | 34 | Minnesota caucus | 17; 11,641 (41%) | 13; 9,353 (33%) | 4; 2,910 (10%) | 1,300 (5%) | 2,684 (10%) | 27,888 |
| March 5 (Super Tuesday) (252) | 16 | Rhode Island primary | 11; 9,706 (64%) | 387 (3%) | 128 (1%) | 2,866 (19%) | 2; 1,971 (4%) | 15,058 |
| March 5 (Super Tuesday) (252) | 13 | Vermont primary | 5; 23,419 (40%) | 2; 9,730 (17%) | 2; 9,066 (16%) | 1; 6,145 (11%) | 2; 9,757 (15%) | 58,117 |
| March 7 | | New York primary | (55%) | (15%) | (30%) | – | – | |
| March 9 | | Missouri caucus | (28%) | (36%) | (1%) | – | (9%) | |
| March 12 | | Florida primary | (57%) | (18%) | (20%) | (1%) | (5%) | |
| March 12 | | Louisiana primary | (48%) | (33%) | (12%) | (2%) | (1%) | |
| March 12 | | Mississippi primary | (60%) | (26%) | (8%) | (2%) | (4%) | |
| March 12 | | Oklahoma primary | (59%) | (22%) | (14%) | (1%) | (2%) | |
| March 12 | | Oregon primary | (51%) | (21%) | (13%) | (7%) | (5%) | |
| March 12 | 37 | Tennessee primary | 37; 148,063 (51%) | 72,928 (25%) | 22,171 (8%) | 32,742 (11%) | 13,482 (4%) | 289,386 |
| March 12 | | Texas primary | (56%) | (21%) | (13%) | (2%) | (6%) | |
| March 19 | | Illinois primary | (65%) | (23%) | (5%) | (1%) | (6%) | |
| March 19 | | Michigan primary | (51%) | (34%) | (5%) | (1%) | (3%) | |
| March 19 | | Ohio primary | (66%) | (22%) | (6%) | (3%) | (3%) | |
| March 19 | | Wisconsin primary | (53%) | (34%) | (6%) | (2%) | (3%) | |
| March 26 | | California primary | (66%) | (18%) | (7%) | (2%) | (7%) | |
| March 26 | | Nevada primary | (52%) | (15%) | (19%) | (2%) | (1%) | |
| March 26 | | Washington primary | (63%) | (21%) | (9%) | (1%) | (5%) | |
| April 23 | | Pennsylvania primary | (64%) | (18%) | (8%) | – | (11%) | |
| May 7 | | Washington D.C. primary | (75%) | (9%) | – | – | – | |
| May 7 | | Indiana primary | (71%) | (19%) | (10%) | – | – | |
| May 7 | | North Carolina primary | (71%) | (13%) | (4%) | (2%) | (5%) | |
| May 14 | | Nebraska primary | (76%) | (10%) | (6%) | (3%) | (3%) | |
| May 14 | | West Virginia primary | (69%) | (16%) | (5%) | (3%) | (7%) | |
| May 21 | | Arkansas primary | (76%) | (23%) | – | – | – | |
| May 28 | | Idaho primary | (66%) | (22%) | – | – | (5%) | |
| May 28 | | Kentucky primary | 26; 76,669 (74%) | 0; 8,526 (8%) | 0; 3,400 (3%) | 0; 3,272 (3%) | 0; 11,972 (12%) (Note: Uncommitted 4,793 (5%) Alan Keyes 3,822 (4%) Richard Lugar 2,235 (2%) Phil Gramm 1,122 (1%)) | 103,839 |
| June 1 | | Virginia caucus | Unknown | – | – | – | – | |
| June 4 | | Alabama primary | (76%) | (16%) | – | – | (3%) | |
| June 4 | | Montana primary | (61%) | (24%) | (7%) | – | – | |
| June 4 | | New Jersey primary | (82%) | (11%) | – | – | (7%) | |
| June 4 | | New Mexico primary | (76%) | (8%) | (6%) | (4%) | (4%) | |
| Total | | | 9,024,742 (58.8%) | 3,184,943 (20.8%) | 1,751,187 (11.4%) | 495,590 (3.2%) | 856,881 (5.6%) | |

=== Nationwide ===
Convention tally:

- Bob Dole 1,928
- Pat Buchanan 43
- Steve Forbes 2
- Alan Keyes 1
- Robert Bork 1

=== Notable endorsements ===
Bob Dole

- Former Senator and 1964 Presidential nominee Barry Goldwater of Arizona
- Governor George W. Bush of Texas
- Senator Bill Roth of Delaware
- Senator Alan Simpson of Wyoming
- Senator Al D'Amato of New York
- Senator Mark Hatfield of Oregon
- Former Governor Pete du Pont of Delaware
- Former Governor George Wallace of Alabama (Democrat)

Pat Buchanan

- William P. Clark, Jr., Associate Justice of the California Supreme Court (1973–1981), 6th United States Deputy Secretary of State (1981–1982), 11th United States National Security Advisor (1982–1983), 44th United States Secretary of the Interior (1983–1985)
- Governor Mike Foster of Louisiana
- State Senator Dick Mountjoy of California
- Former U.S. National Security Advisor Richard Allen
- Former Governor Evan Mecham of Arizona
- Future Arizona state senator Karen Johnson (1997-2008
- Roger Milliken, CEO of Milliken & Company
- Mark DeMoss, president of The DeMoss Group
- Judie Brown - president of the American Life League
- Larry Pratt - executive director of Gun Owners of America, and a former member of the Virginia House of Delegates (1980–1982).
- Charley Reese - conservative columnist for the Orlando Sentinel (1971–2001)
- Lewis Tambs - United States Ambassador to Colombia (1983–1985), United States Ambassador to Costa Rica (1985–1987)
- Paul Gottfried - paleoconservative political philosopher, historian, and writer
- Donald Wildmon - chairman of the American Family Association
- Tom Monaghan - CEO of Domino's Pizza
- Nackey Loeb - publisher for the conservative Manchester Union Leader newspaper
- Barbara Coe - chairwoman of the California Coalition for Immigration Reform
- Michael Farris - founder of the Home School Legal Defense Association (HSLDA) and Patrick Henry College
- David Duke - 1988 and 1992 presidential candidate.

Steve Forbes

- Former Representative and HUD Secretary Jack Kemp of New York
- Former Senator Gordon Humphrey of New Hampshire
- U.S. Rep. Frank Cremeans of Ohio.
- U.S. Rep. Bob Franks of New Jersey.

Lamar Alexander

- Former Governor Tom Kean of New Jersey
- Former Secretary of Education Bill Bennett

Phil Gramm

- Senator John McCain of Arizona
- Senator Kay Bailey Hutchison of Texas

Pete Wilson

- Governor Bill Weld of Massachusetts
- Perot's 1992 running-mate and retired admiral James Stockdale of Illinois

== Convention and vice presidential selection ==
The delegates at the Republican National Convention formally nominated Dole on August 15, 1996, as the GOP presidential candidate for the general election. Dole was the oldest first-time presidential nominee at the age of 73 years, 1 month (Ronald Reagan was 73 years, 6 months in 1984, for his second presidential nomination).

Former Representative and Cabinet secretary Jack Kemp was nominated by acclamation as Dole's running mate the following day. Republican Party of Texas convention delegates informally nominated Alan Keyes as their preference for vice president.

Other politicians mentioned as possible GOP V.P. nominees before Kemp was selected included:

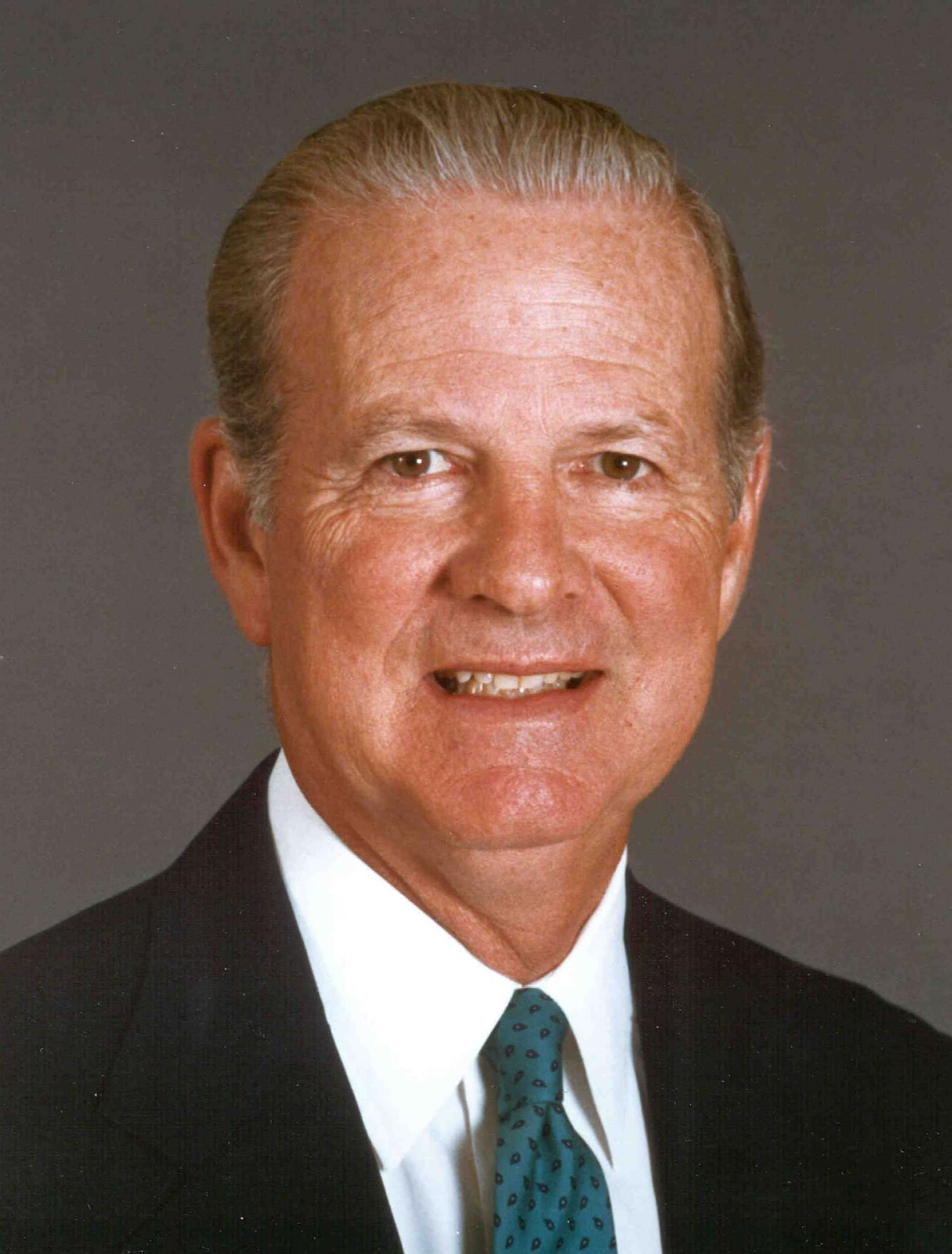
Former Secretary of State James Baker of Texas

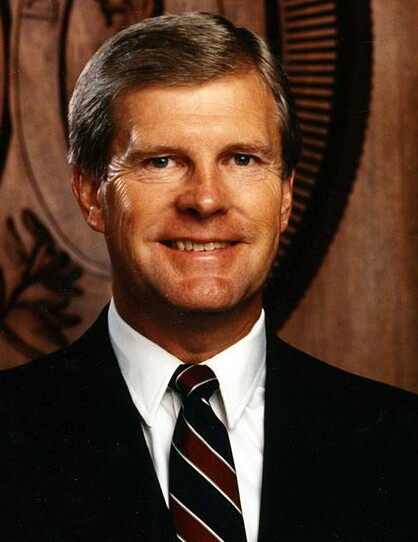
Former Governor Carroll Campbell of South Carolina

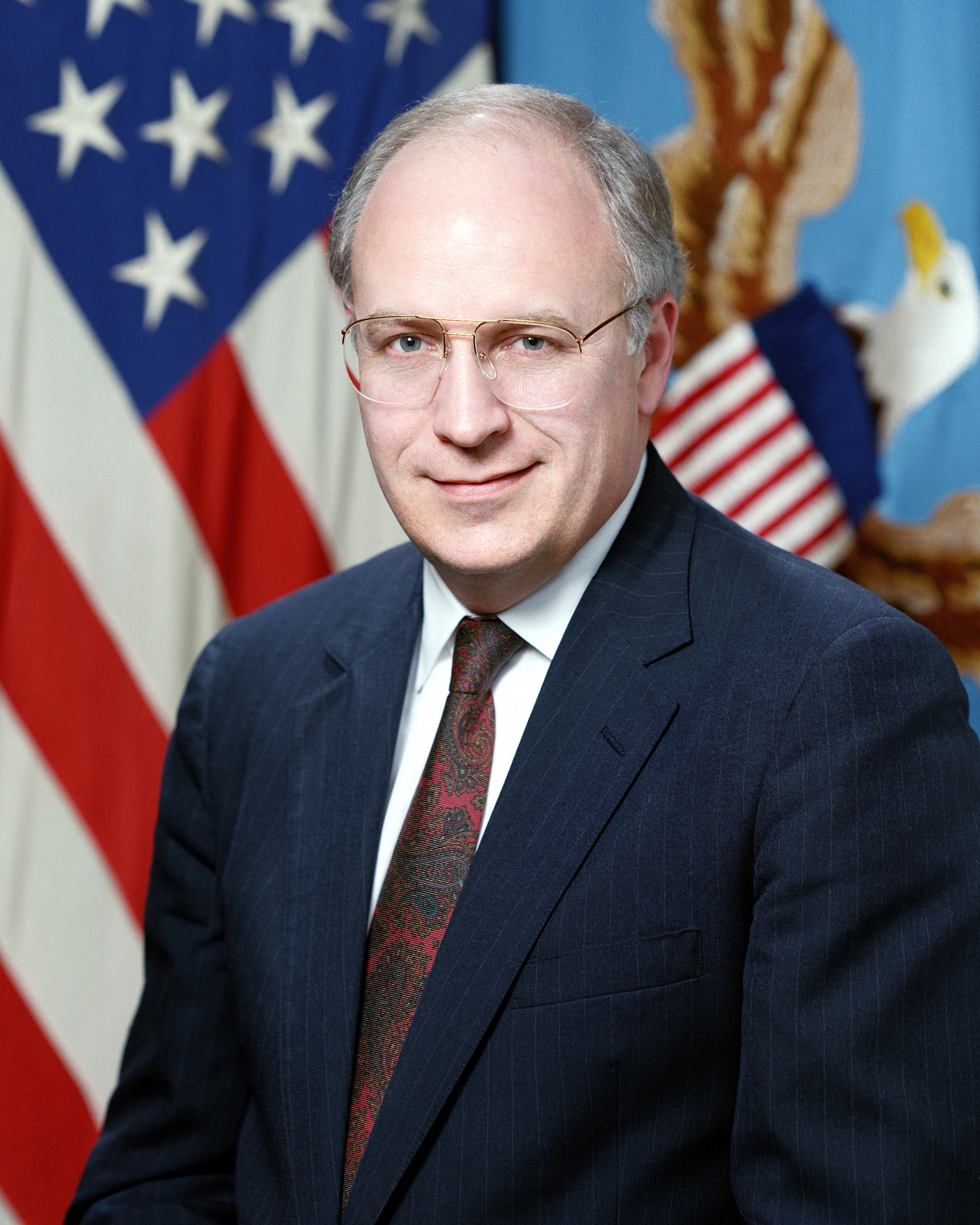
Former Secretary of Defense Dick Cheney of Wyoming

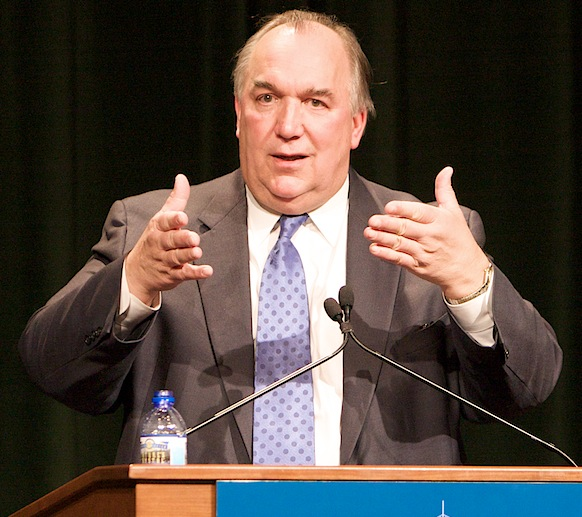
Governor John Engler of Michigan

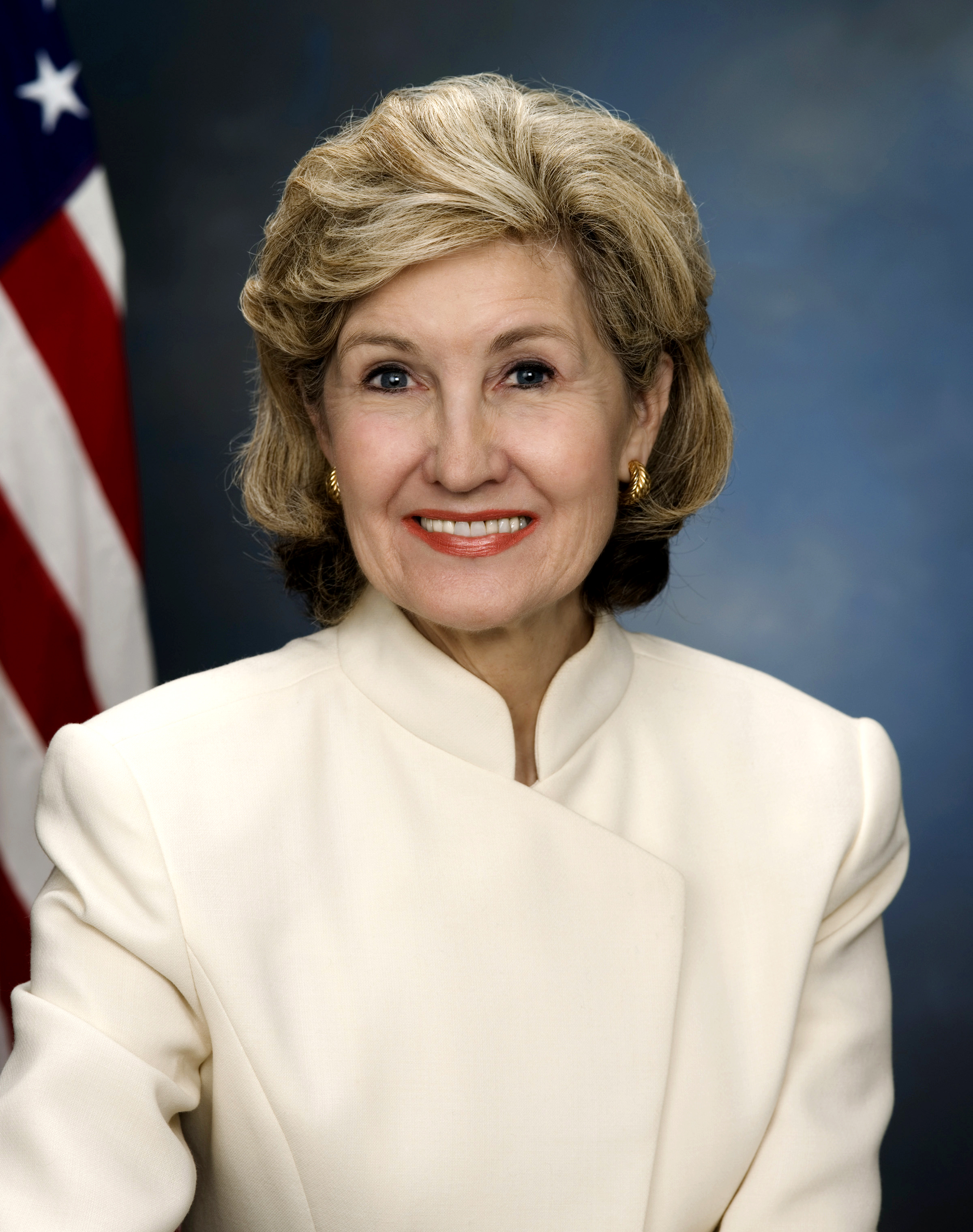
U.S. Senator Kay Bailey Hutchison of Texas

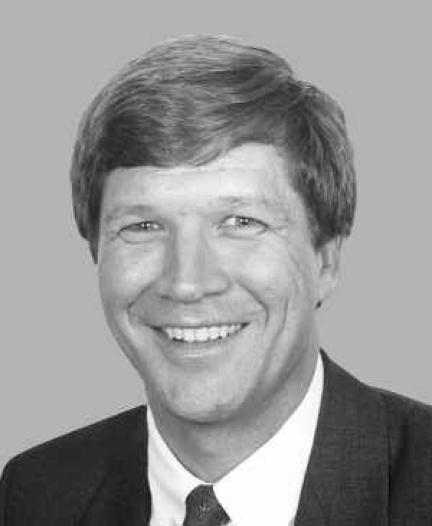
U.S. Representative John Kasich of Ohio

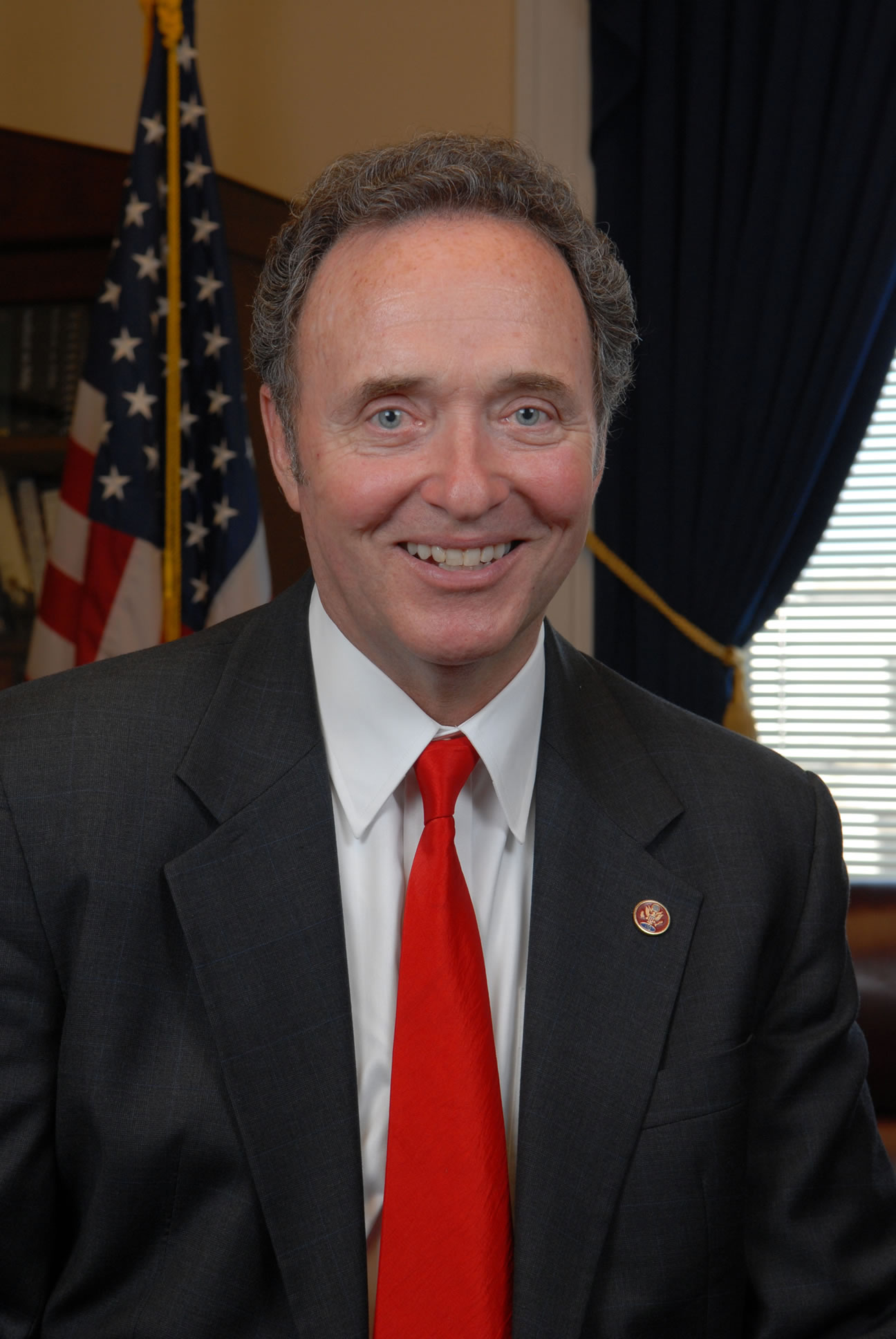
State Attorney General Dan Lungren of California

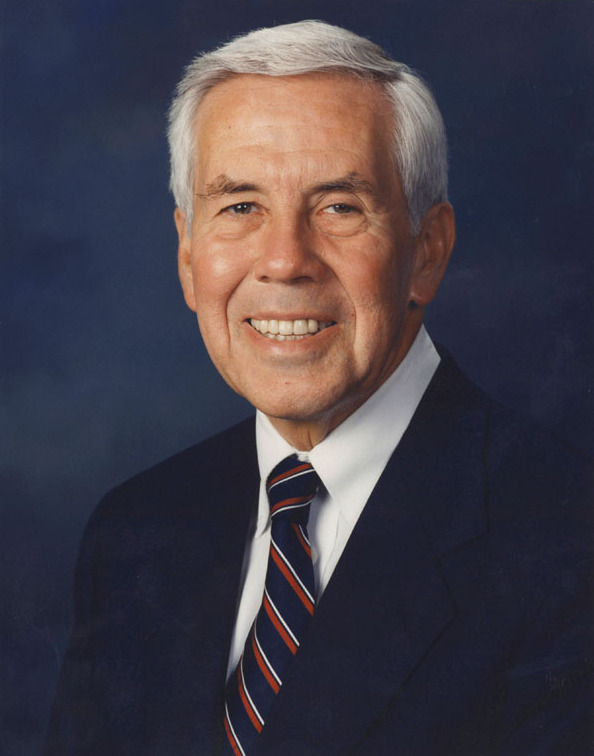
U.S. Senator Dick Lugar of Indiana

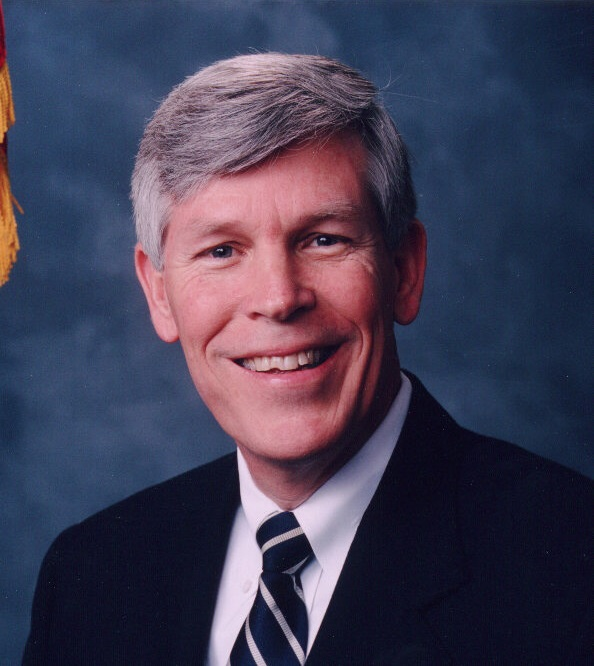
U.S. Senator Connie Mack III of Florida

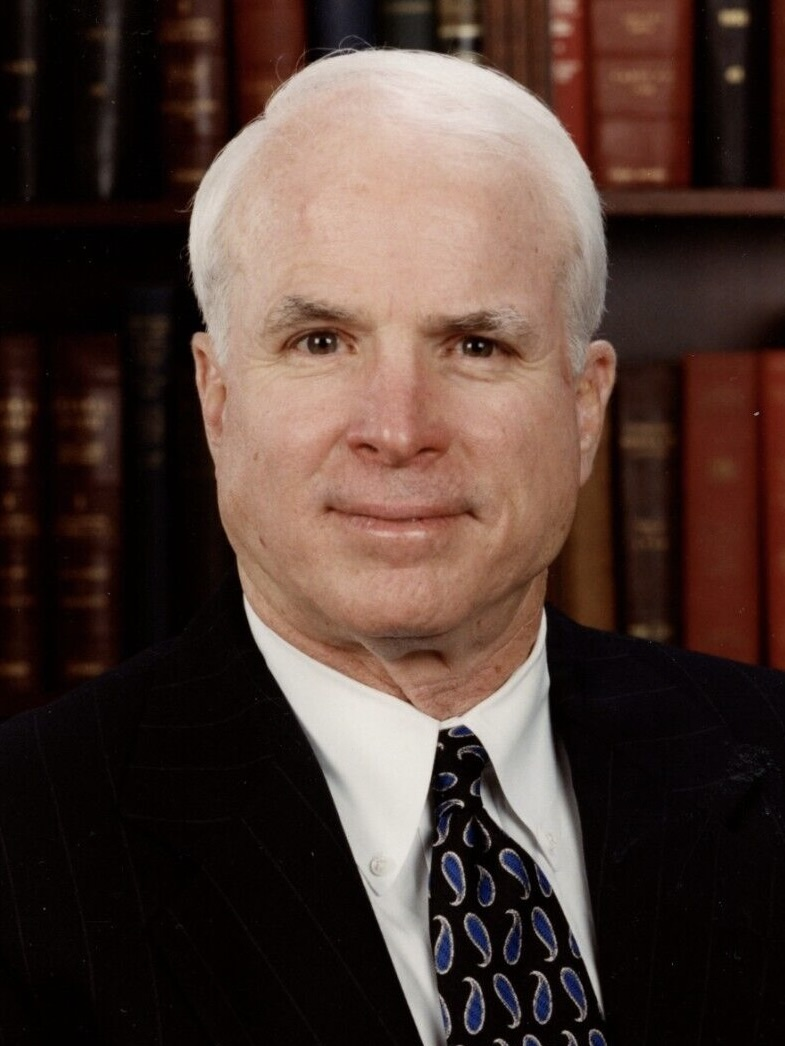
U.S. Senator John McCain of Arizona

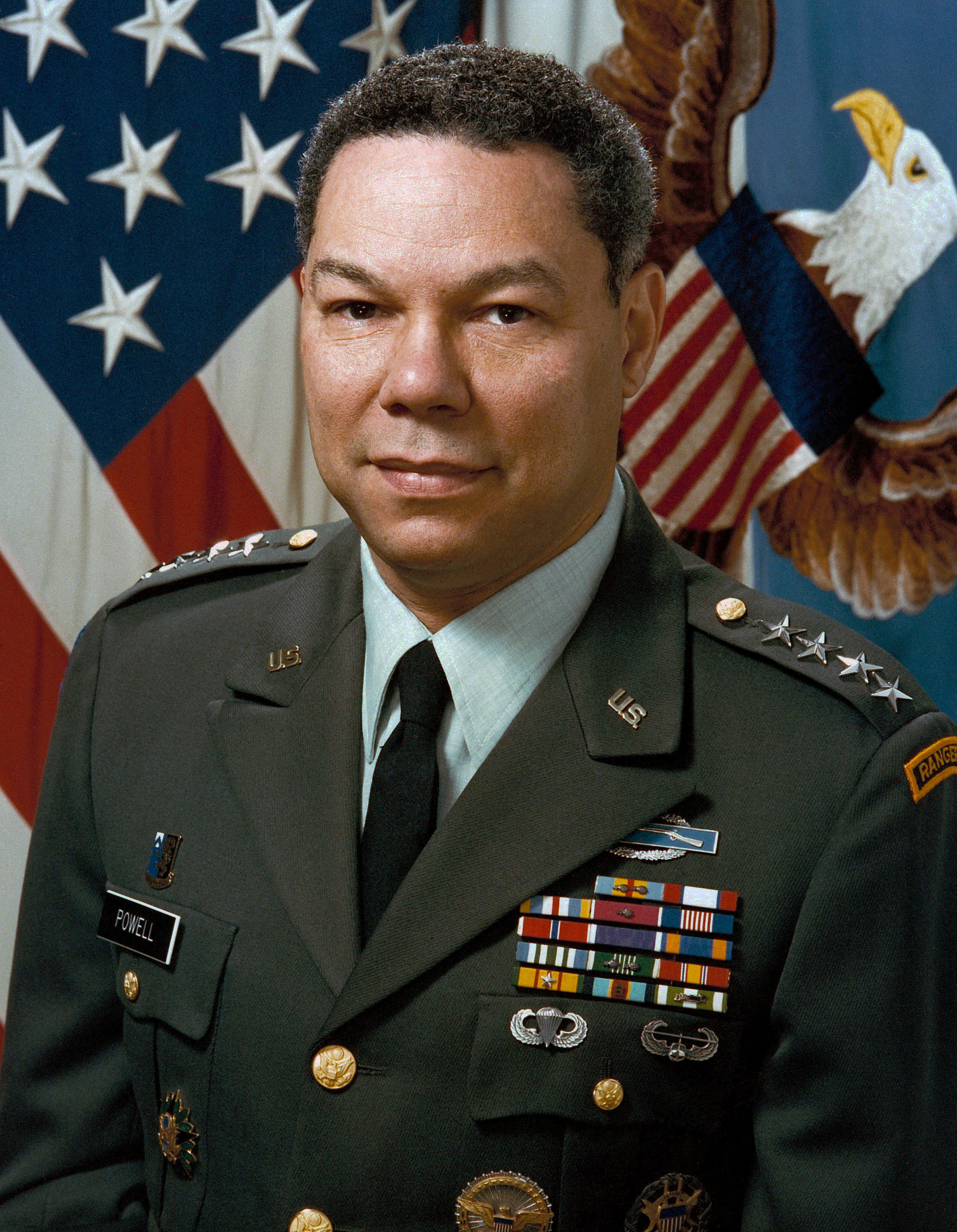
General Colin Powell of New York

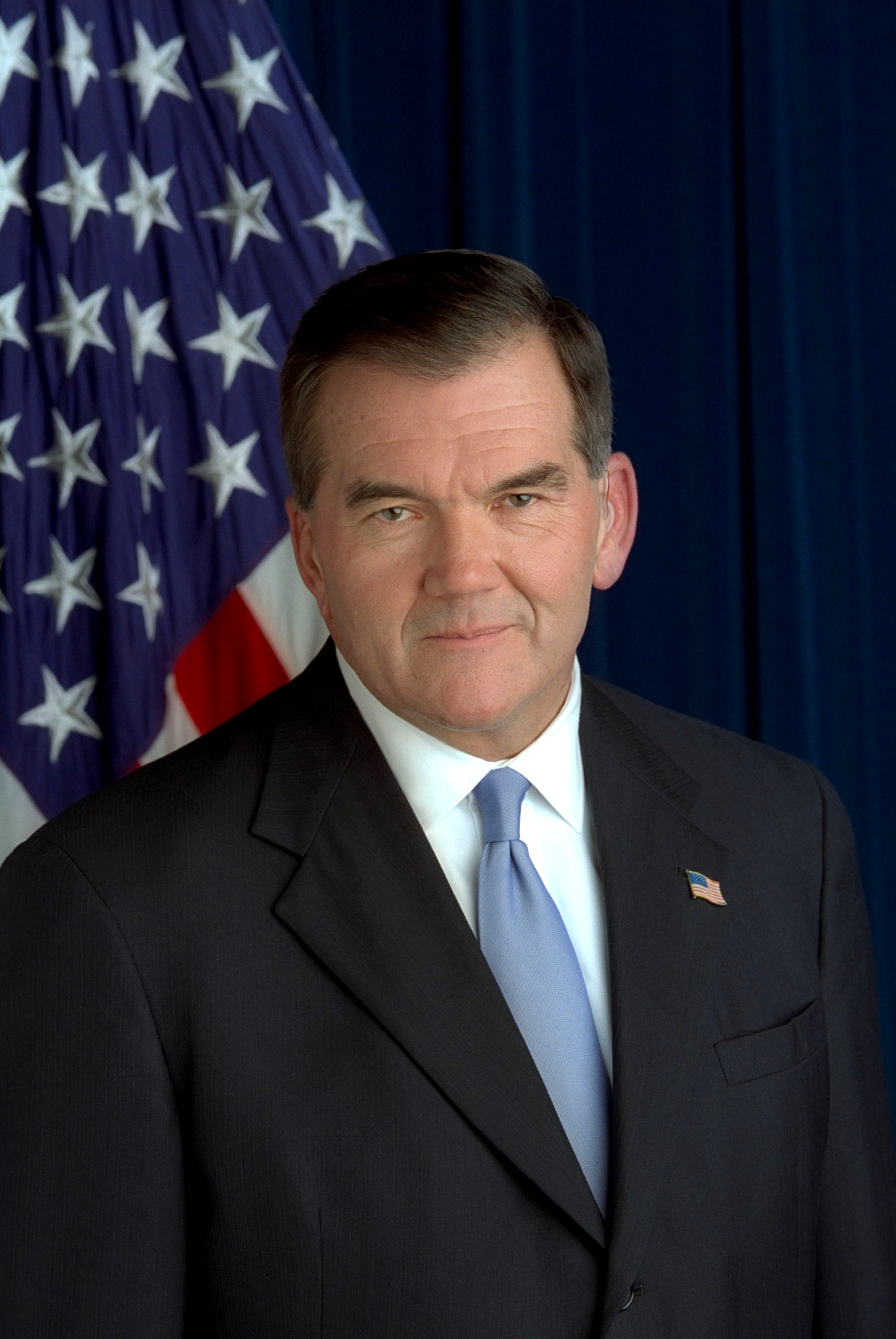
Governor Tom Ridge of Pennsylvania

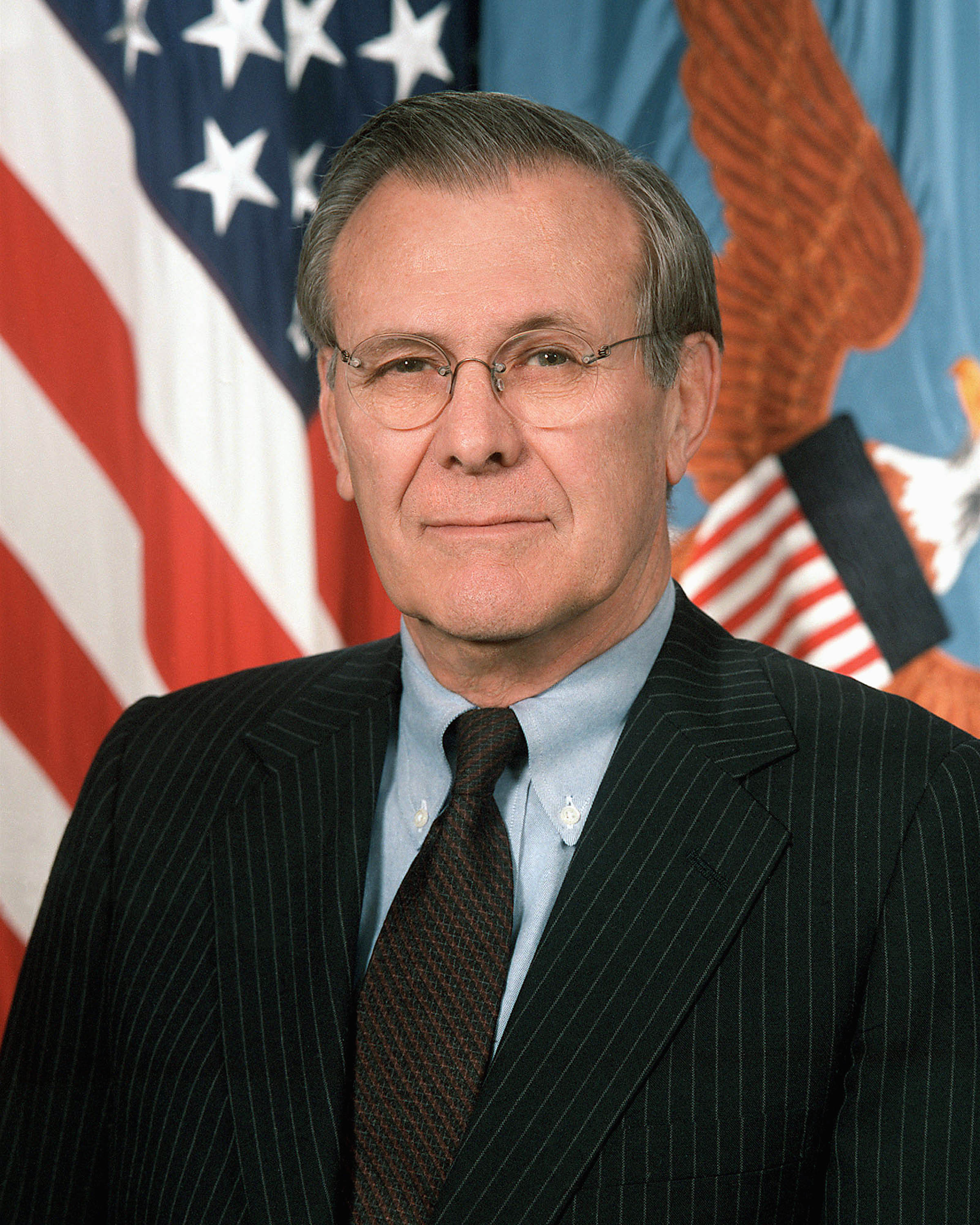
Former Secretary of Defense Donald Rumsfeld of Illinois

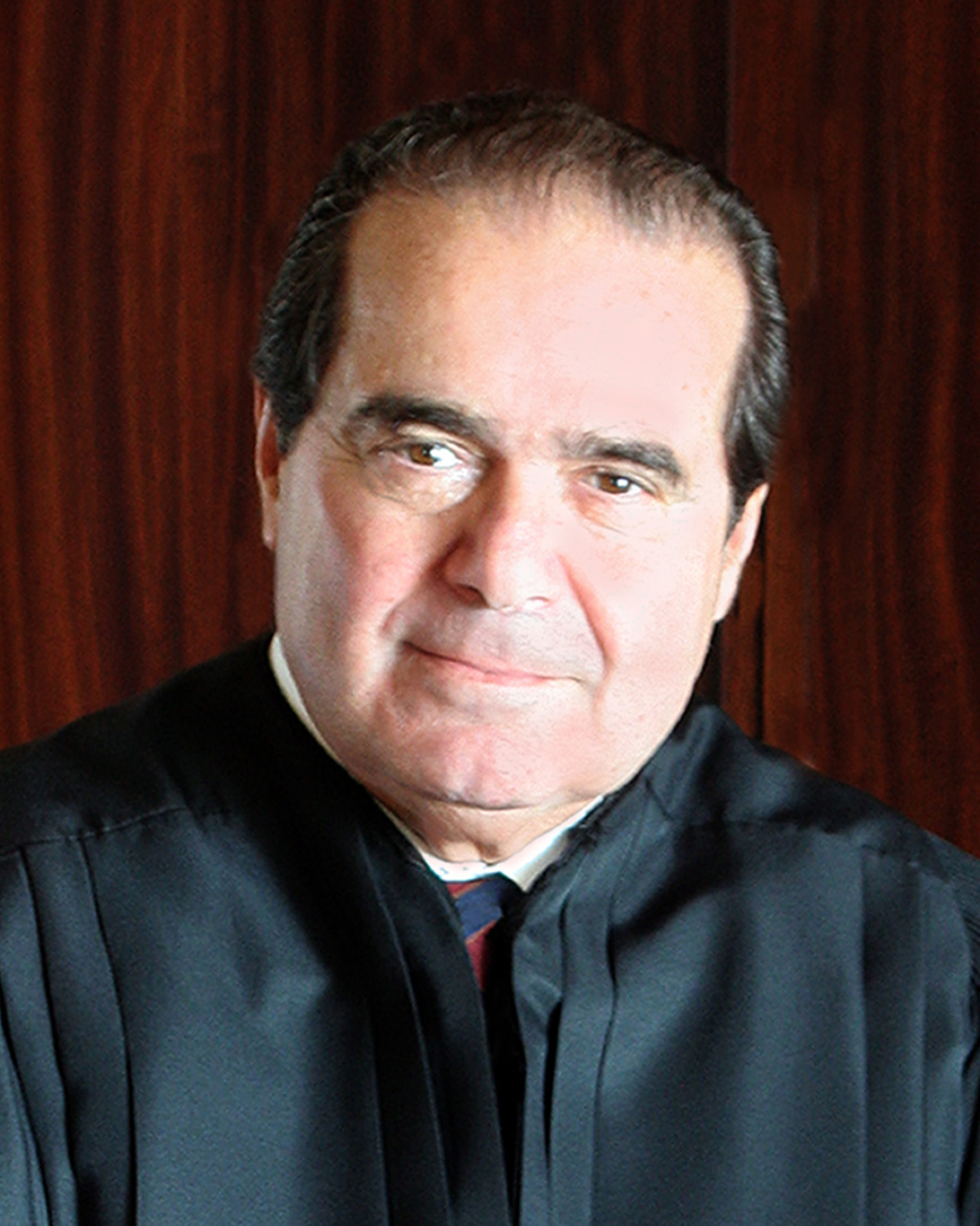
Associate Justice Antonin Scalia of the District of Columbia

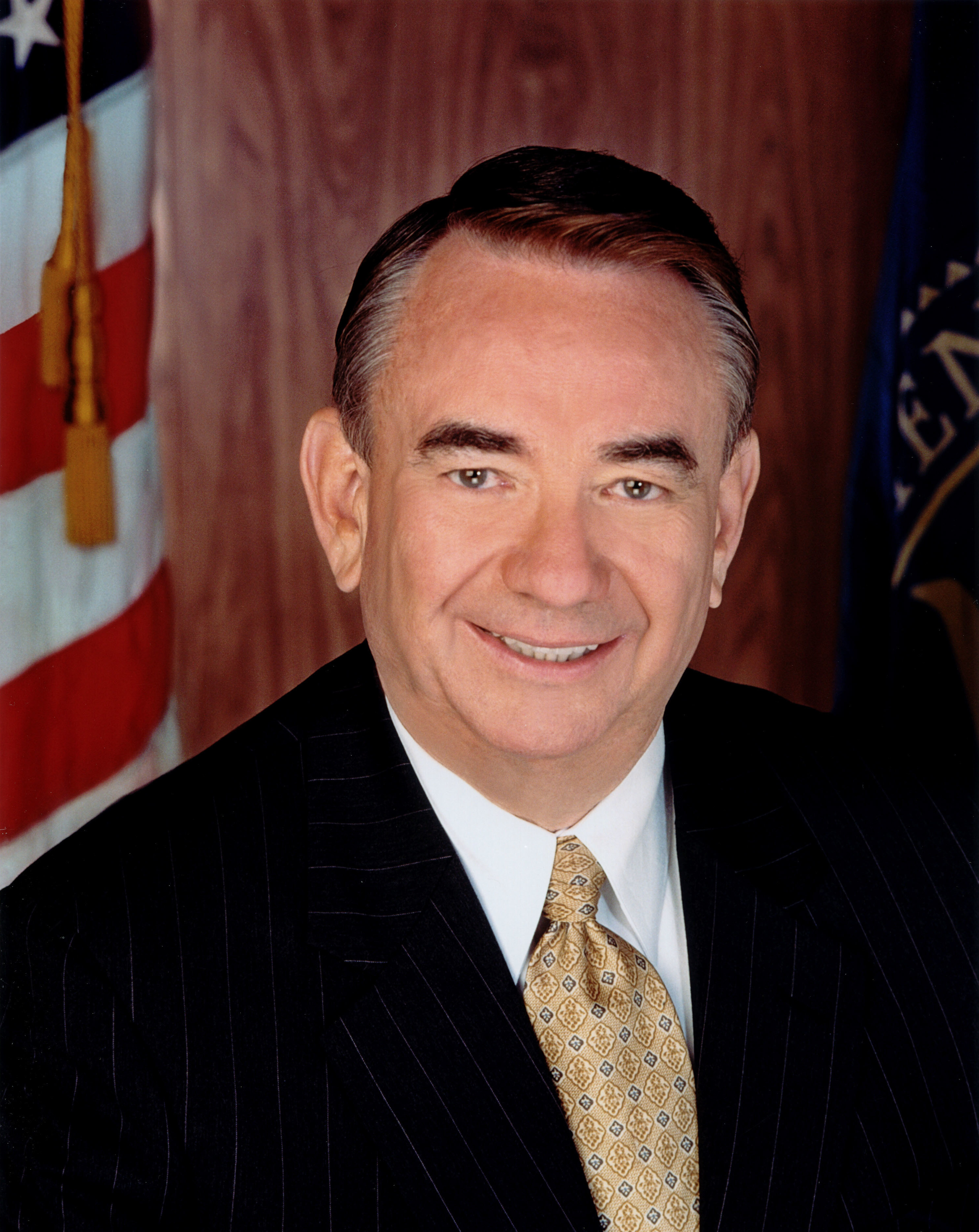
Governor Tommy Thompson of Wisconsin

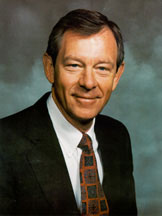
Governor George Voinovich of Ohio

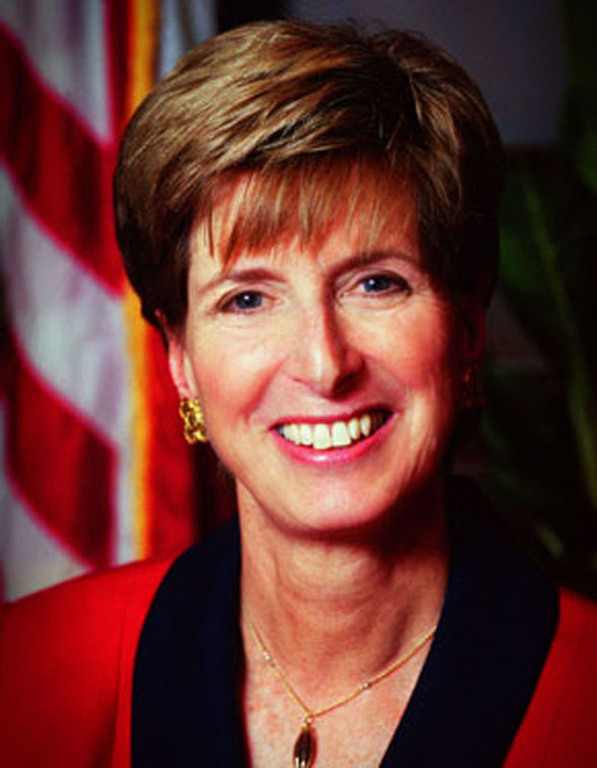
Governor Christine Todd Whitman of New Jersey

== See also ==
- 1996 Democratic Party presidential primaries
