= Pat Buchanan presidential campaign =

Pat Buchanan has unsuccessfully run for president three times; it may refer to:

- Pat Buchanan 1992 presidential campaign
- Pat Buchanan 1996 presidential campaign
- Pat Buchanan 2000 presidential campaign
