= David Duke presidential campaign =

David Duke presidential campaign might refer to:

- David Duke 1988 presidential campaign
- David Duke 1992 presidential campaign
