= 1992 New Hampshire Republican presidential primary =

- February 18, 1992
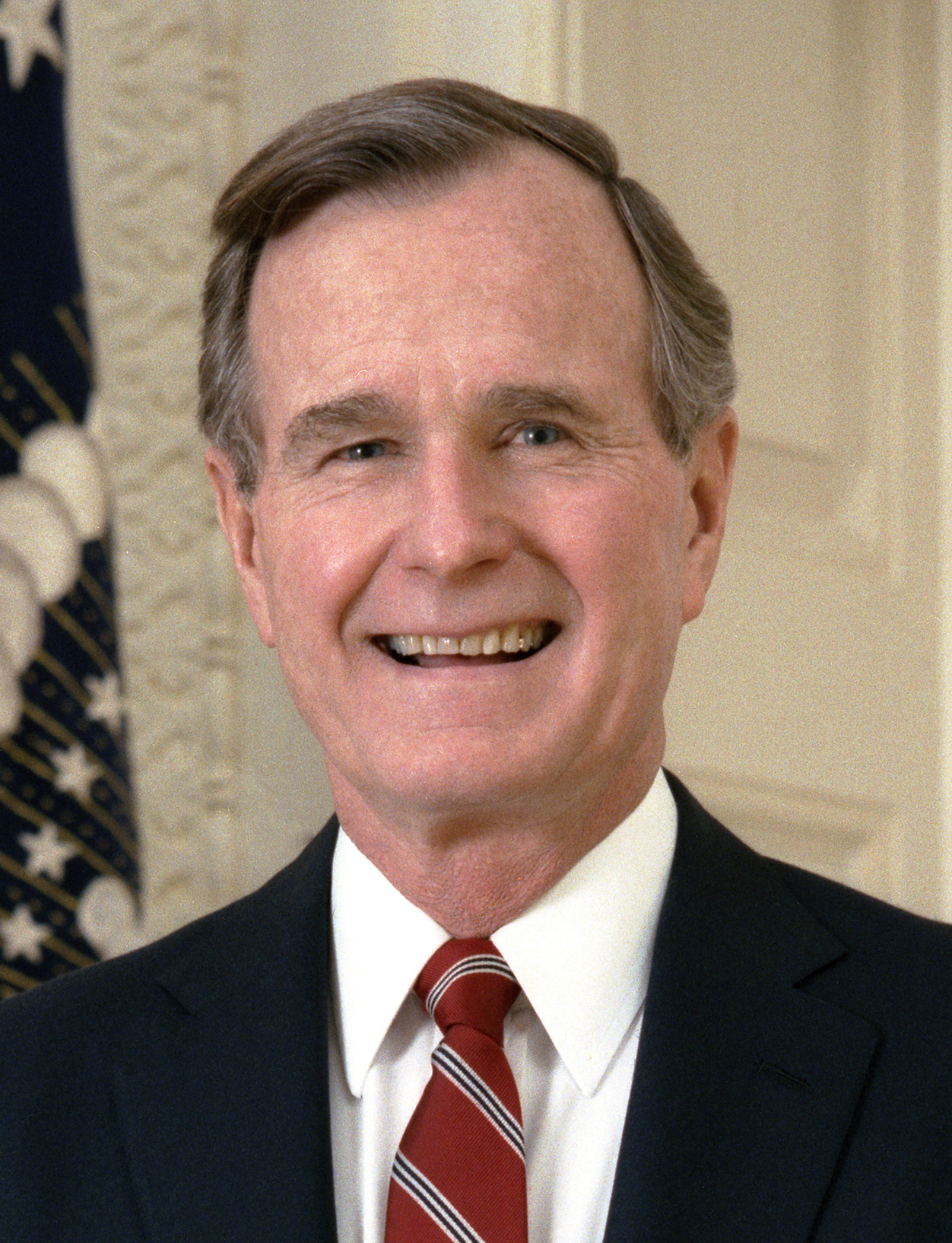

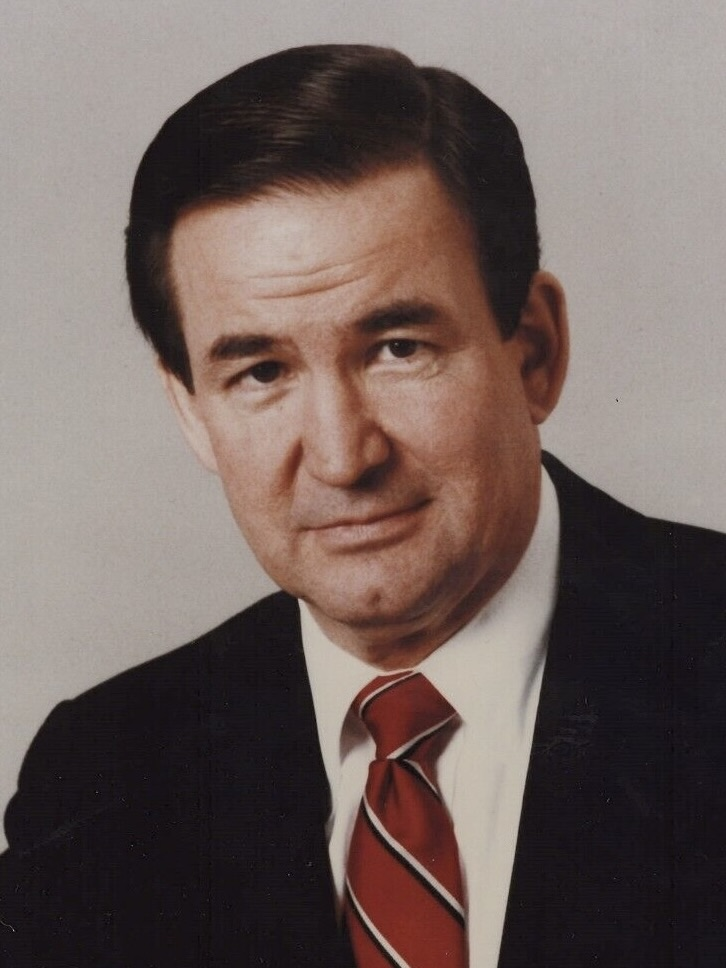
Candidate	George H. W. Bush	Pat Buchanan
Home state	Texas	Virginia
Delegate count	14	9
Popular vote	92,271	65,106
Percentage	53.1%	37.5%

First place by county
Bush
Vote share by county
Bush
40–50%
50–60%

The 1992 New Hampshire Republican presidential primary took place on February 18, 1992, as one of the Republican Party's statewide nomination contests ahead of the 1992 United States presidential election.

== Details ==
Incumbent Republican President George H. W. Bush, who had alienated a portion of conservatives by breaking his promise in 1988 for "No New Taxes" during his administration, defeated insurgent paleoconservative candidate Pat Buchanan. However, his 15.6% margin of victory was unusually narrow for an incumbent president, and foreshadowed his weaknesses amongst the conservative GOP base.

Bush would go on to receive the Republican nomination, winning every state, but lost in the general election to Arkansas Governor Bill Clinton.
