= National Association for the Advancement of White People =

White supremacist organization

- Abbreviation: NAAWP
- Formation: 1979–present
- Type: White supremacist organization
- Headquarters: Florida
- Region served: United States
- Official language: English
- Leader: Reno Wolfe

The National Association for the Advancement of White People (NAAWP) is a white supremacist organization established in 1979 by former Ku Klux Klan Grand Wizard David Duke, deriving its name from the National Association for the Advancement of Colored People. It is considered a racist hate group by the Southern Poverty Law Center.

== History and formation ==
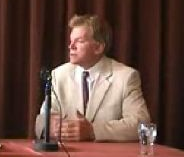
David Duke speaking in Belgium, circa 2008. Duke's international presence has been diminished, due to platforms such as Twitter banning him under violations of their rules.

In December 1979, Grand Wizard David Duke left the Klan to make his own organization. Duke was unsatisfied with the Ku Klux Klan's public image, especially following the November 1979 clash in Greensboro between Ku Klux Klan Knights and the Communist Workers Party, which left 5 dead. Additionally, Duke's reputation within the Klan had been damaged, due to a scandal orchestrated by long-time rival Bill Wilkinson, who had agreed to pay $35,000 (which Duke intended on using to fund the NAAWP) in exchange for a list of Klan members' names and addresses, which are typically highly protected and private due to safety and anonymity reasons. Three days after Wilkinson exposed Duke, Duke resigned as Grand Wizard, stating "I'm resigning because I don't think the Klan can succeed at this point... because of its violent image and because of people like Bill Wilkinson".

On the 20th of December, Duke incorporated the NAAWP as a non profit organization. In a letter sent to all members of the Ku Klux Klan when he left, Duke enclosed the first issue of the pre-existing NAAWP newspaper, titled the NAAWP News. He wrote:

I hope that many of you will see the potential of this Movement to garner support from America’s White majority. I would like to personally invite you to join the NAAWP.

— David Duke

As the Ku Klux Klan declined in the 1980s, many members followed Duke into the newly formed group. Duke aimed to make the NAAWP more modern and palatable to the public in order to gain support and respect. However, it has still been described as "simply the Klan without sheets".

== Leadership ==
It is believed that Duke stepped away from the NAAWP at some point in the mid 1990s, passing leadership to Paul Allen. Duke went on to focus on his political career.

=== Paul Allen ===
In 1997, an ABC Prime Time Live report of NAAWP and Ku Klux Klan members meeting with each other at NAAWP official Dan Daniels' Florida ranch called the loyalties of the NAAWP's leaders into question. Daniels stepped back from both the NAAWP, and his job as the sheriff of Polk County, Florida. Allen instructed all local NAAWP leaders to avoid portraying themselves as racists or extremists in public at all costs, in order to protect the group's image. This declaration severely damaged the NAAWP, with many of its extremist members believing that Allen had become too weak.

=== Reno Wolfe ===
Allen was ousted as national president by 1998, with leadership being assumed by Reno Wolfe. Wolfe is the last known leader of the organization, however, it is currently unknown whether or not this is still accurate, due to no official statement being made regarding continued involvement as the group has seemingly become inactive. He relocated the headquarters from New Orleans to Florida, where Wolfe resides, and began to entirely distance the NAAWP from David Duke in an attempt to rebrand the organization. Wolfe rejects the idea that the NAAWP is a white supremacist group, instead stating that they are an equal rights advocate group that supports equality as it was envisioned in the 1964 Civil Rights Act.

== Organization ==
=== Historical chapters ===
From 1979 until 1999, the organization existed in state and regional chapters with representative leaders. Following Allen's tenure as national president, the group reportedly shrank from 79 chapters in 1997 to just 13 by the end of 1999. This number grew to 52 chapters by the end of 2000, under Wolfe's new leadership, including chapters in Canada and South Africa.

State and regional chapters advocated issues specific to them. Ronald Edmiston, the director of the NAAWP's Hawaii chapter, took the NAAWP's beliefs and applied them to a Hawaiian context, criticizing hate-crime laws as a reflection of Hawaii's liberal politics. He also supported Hawaiian sovereignty, due to his right wing political beliefs.

=== Current presence ===
Much of the NAAWP's activities, like other white supremacist organizations, have been shifted online. The internet has provided a means for the NAAWP to expand its influence and attract more members. This is leading to decentralization within the organization, but also a wider dispersion of their influence - the NAAWP previously maintained their own website and magazine, which was publicly available online. Supremacist groups thrive online due to the veil of anonymity and ability to form communities with like-minded people, sharing information and propaganda unfit for mainstream media.

Due to this, it is difficult to predict the growth or decline of the NAAWP. Their previous web domain, www.naawp.com, is now inactive, meaning that the group has either lost relevance or moved to more private forums. With the resurgence in white supremacist movements, it may be the case that the organization still exists, but does so covertly. Some of the most recent coverage regarding the NAAWP comes from 2000, where they launched Operation Appalachian, a charity initiative. Their web page lists Rick Shaddock as the organization's Executive Director. The organization hosted a conference at the Sheraton Pentagon City Hotel in 2013.

== Ideology and beliefs ==
Many white supremacy organizations, including the NAAWP, have shifted into a victim mindset and hold reverse-racism to be one of their primary concerns. They believe that organizations such as the National Association for the Advancement of Colored People promote racial discrimination by enforcing policies that are discriminatory against white people, for example in employment and education. In American society, the NAAWP believes that African Americans have the greatest opportunities and enjoy living at the highest standard. They portray themselves as “innocent victims and benevolent champions of equality and justice”. The group is also heavily antisemitic. Members believe they are unfairly targeted and therefore unable to express pride in their race, with them resultantly believing their identities are under assault, resulting in low self-esteem due to this destruction of pride.

As the NAAWP, under Wolfe's leadership, label themselves an equal rights group, their main focus is on preferential treatment towards minorities. They believe that there is a lack of white representation in all levels of government in the United States, expanding into the international community. Further, they hold the opinion that the rise of political correctness has not only damaged the reputation of white people, but poses a risk to their human rights. Members of the NAAWP hold that the rise of reverse-racism stems from increased discrimination against white people due to preferential treatment of minorities, as seen in politics and in immigration laws. They believe that there is a degradation of moral value in society. The NAAWP consider themselves a fundamentally Christian organization which strongly opposes transgenderism and homosexuality, the rise of feminism, and immigration to the United States from primarily non-white/non-European countries. The collapse of the patriarchal family model is another concern, with a male-centered nuclear household seen as the preferred model for families.

Legally, the NAAWP advocates for a strong law and order stance, characterized by an appreciation of constitutional rights (especially the right to bear arms), increased police and military powers, harsh penalties for criminal activity, and the continuation of the death penalty.

== Charity work (Operation Appalachian) ==
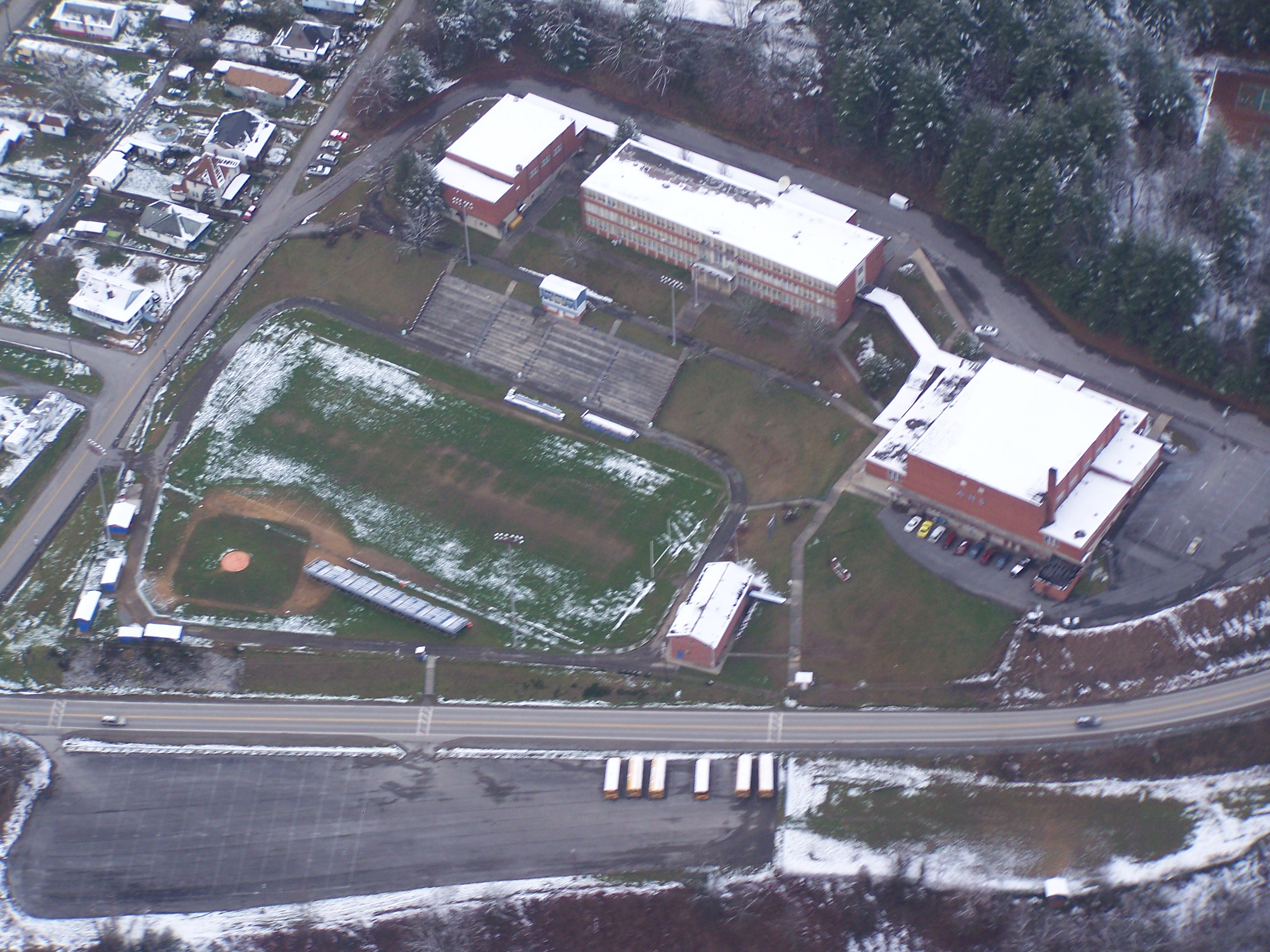
An aerial photograph of Appalachia High School, Virginia

The NAAWP launched Operation Appalachian in August, 2000. The project focused on delivering basic necessities, especially school supplies, to white residents of Appalachia, an area known to lack basic educational infrastructure and basic services such as healthcare. Pencils, calculators, notebooks, and book bags were given away, accompanied with their own brochures. They partnered with local Churches to distribute the supplies, including the Church of Nazarene in Loudendale, West Virginia. However, spokespeople for the Church claimed they were misled and unaware of the NAAWP's platform. 250 children and their families received these supplies under this project. Contrarily, Lincoln County, North Carolina were unwelcoming to their initiative, with the superintendent denying the NAAWP's requests to launch their project there.

== See also ==
- List of white nationalist organizations
- White demographic decline
