= 1992 Republican Party presidential primaries =

Selection of Republican US presidential candidate

- February 18 to June 9, 1992

2,209 delegates to the Republican National Convention 1,105 (majority) votes needed to win
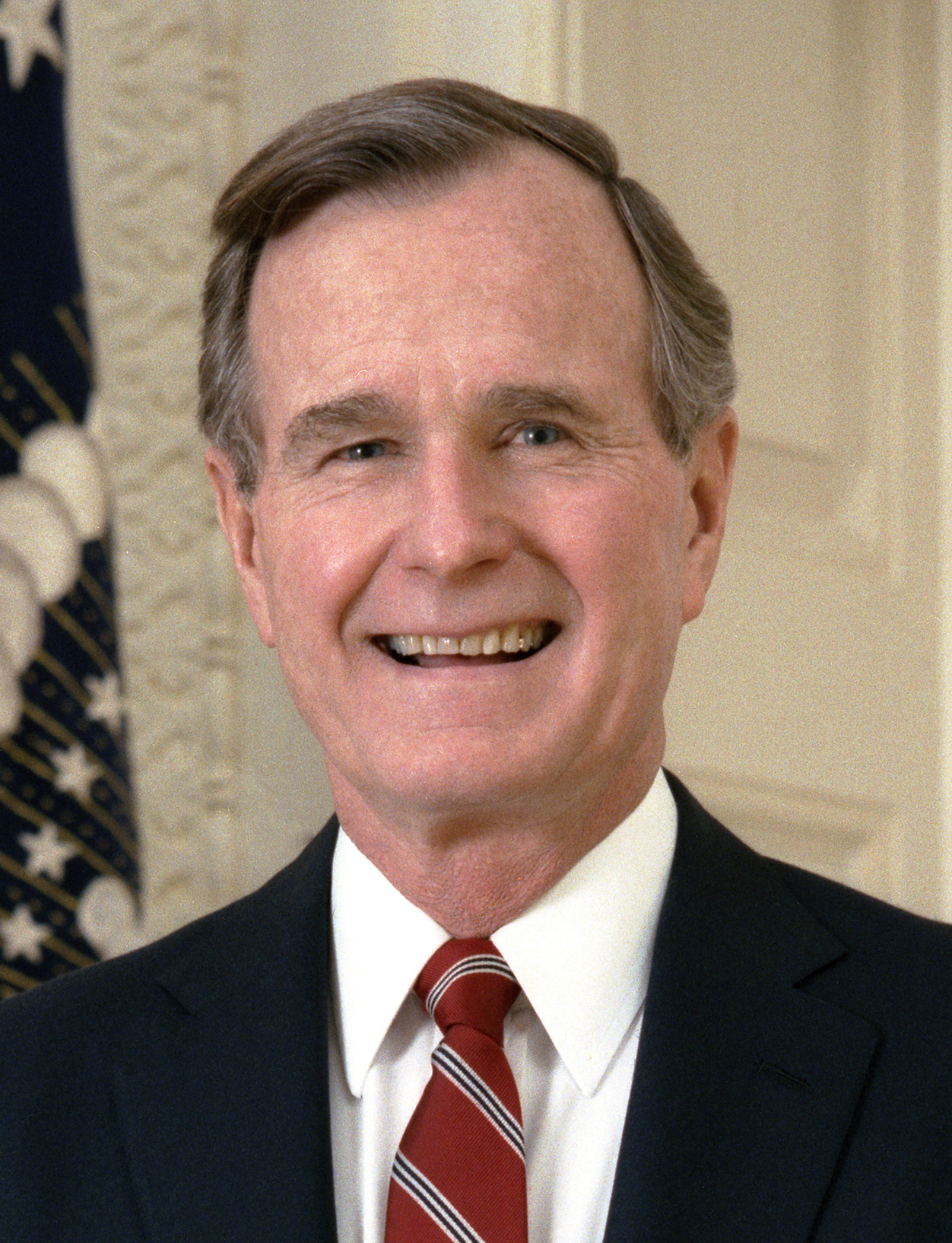

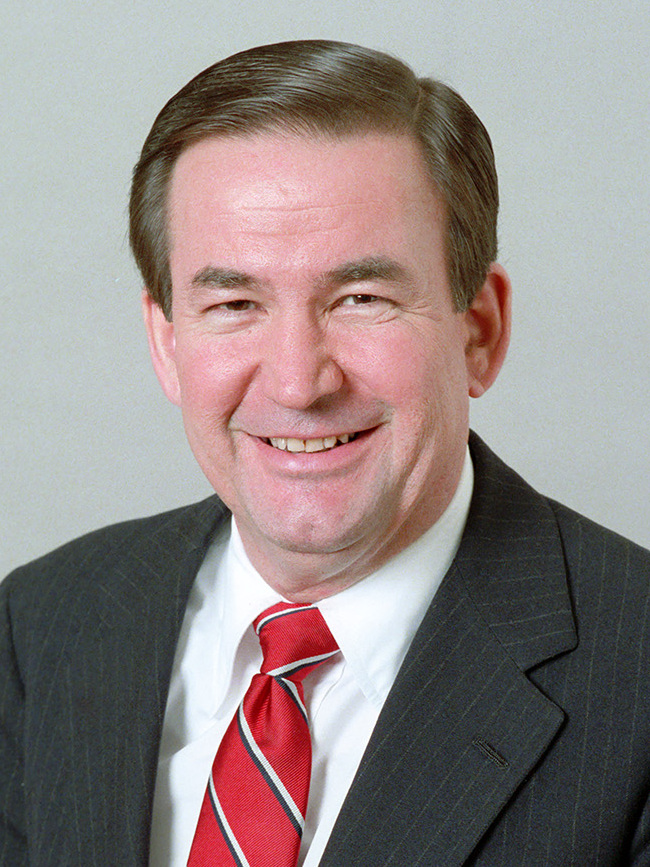
Candidate	George H. W. Bush	Pat Buchanan
Home state	Texas	Virginia
Delegate count	1,544	367
Contests won	51	0
Popular vote	9,199,463	2,899,488
Percentage	72.8%	23.0%
- Gold denotes a state won by George H. W. Bush. Grey denotes a state or territory that did not hold a primary/caucus.
Previous Republican nominee
George H. W. Bush
Republican nominee
George H. W. Bush

The 1992 Republican Party presidential primaries were the presidential primaries and caucuses of the Republican Party, which took place in all 50 U.S. states and Washington, D.C., between February 18 to June 9, 1992, in which voters selected 2,277 delegates sent to the Republican National Convention, held in Houston, Texas, between August 17 and August 20, 1992. At the convention, Republican delegates nominated George H. W. Bush, the incumbent U.S. president, as the Republican Party's presidential nominee, and Dan Quayle, the incumbent vice president, as his vice presidential running mate.

In the presidential election held November 3, 1992, Bush and Quayle were defeated by Democrat presidential nominee Bill Clinton and Al Gore, his vice presidential running mate.

== Primary race overview ==
President George H. W. Bush was challenged for the Republican nomination by Pat Buchanan, a conservative author and commentator. During early counting in the New Hampshire primary, it appeared that the president might actually lose. However, Buchanan faded by the end of the evening, and Bush won the rest of the primaries. Bush's margins in many of the primaries were not as large as expected, and led to the rise of Ross Perot as an independent candidate.

Republican Louisiana State Representative and former Ku Klux Klan leader David Duke also ran in a number of primaries, but he did not receive any delegates. Former Governor Harold Stassen of Minnesota also made a quixotic bid for support in the Minnesota primary, winning enough votes to entitle him to one delegate, but was later denied his single vote by machinations at the Minnesota Republican Party's 1992 state convention.

=== New Hampshire primary ===
As Buchanan's candidacy relied heavily on a strong showing in the New Hampshire primary, President Bush made New Hampshire a focal point in his reelection bid. However, New Hampshire still remained a pivotal base for Buchanan's primary campaign.

Because Bush was widely perceived to have broken his "read my lips" pledge, Buchanan found support in the economically battered and conservative state of New Hampshire. Making Bush's tax-hikes a central theme of his campaign, Buchanan enjoyed healthy grass-roots support despite lagging behind the president in pre-primary polling.

Bush countered the threat posed by Buchanan by touring New Hampshire himself. He memorably told an audience at an Exeter town hall: "Message: I care". Some sources claim that this was the result of Bush mistakenly reading a cue card aloud.

On primary night, President Bush carried New Hampshire with 53% of the vote. Buchanan finished second with 38% of the vote.

=== The rest of the race ===
Despite many in the Bush campaign attempting to push Buchanan out of the race, the strong showing made the Buchanan campaign hope for an outpouring of campaign contributions which galvanized the campaign into making efforts to pull out strong showings such as in the Georgia primary.

Despite an impressive showing, Buchanan's campaign never attracted serious opposition to President Bush in most contests. Most of Buchanan's "victories" were larger-than-expected showings that were still considered landslide Bush wins by most of the media. Still, the fact that Buchanan received more than two million votes nationwide presaged trouble for Bush in the general election.

== Candidates ==
=== Nominee ===
Candidate	Most recent office	Home State	Campaign Withdrawal date	Popular vote	Contests won	Running mate
George Bush	President of the United States (1989–1993)	Texas	(Campaign); Secured nomination: May 5, 1992	9,199,463 (72.84%)	51	Dan Quayle

=== Other candidates ===
Candidate	Most recent office	Home State	Campaign Withdrawal date	Popular vote	Contests won
Pat Buchanan	White House Communications Director (1985–1987)	Virginia	(Campaign)	2,899,488 (22.96%)	N/A
David Duke	Member of the Louisiana House of Representatives (1989–1992)	Louisiana	(Campaign)	119,115 (0.94%)	N/A
Pat Paulsen	Comedian	California		10,984 (0.09%)	N/A
Harold Stassen	Director of the United States Foreign Operations Administration (1953–1955)	Minnesota		8,099 (0.06%)	N/A
Jack Fellure	Former Engineer and Perennial Candidate	West Virginia		6,296 (0.05%)	N/A

=== Campaign finance ===
Candidate	Campaign committee				
Candidate	Raised	Total contrib.	Ind. contrib.	Pres. pub. funds	Spent
George H. W. Bush (Note: Including general election)	$104,974,415.00	$31,802,276.00	$31,711,102.00	$65,898,513.00	$107,637,852.00
Pat Buchanan	$14,933,082.00	$7,232,943.00	$7,206,793.00	$5,351,770.00	$14,591,679.00
David Duke	$372,146.00	$221,854.00	$221,945.00	$0.00	$457,449.00
Jack Fellure	$46,748.00	$1,260.00	$1,425.00	$0.00	$47,559.00

=== Declined ===
- Former Governor Pete du Pont of Delaware

== Results ==
Date (daily totals)	Total pledged delegates	Contest	Delegates won and popular vote			Total
Date (daily totals)	Total pledged delegates	Contest	George H. W. Bush	Pat Buchanan	Others	Total
February 10	0	Iowa caucus	Cancelled.			
February 18	23	New Hampshire primary	14; 92,271 (53.2%)	9; 65,106 (37.5%)	3,779 (2.3%) (Note: TBA)	
February 19	22	South Dakota primary	14; 30,964 (69.3%)	—	5; 13,707 (30.68%) (Note: All votes for uncommitted delegates)	
March 3 (131)	37	Colorado primary	26; 132,049 (68.2%)	11; 58,730 (30.3%)	2,957 (1.53%) (Note: TBA)	
March 3 (131)	42	Maryland primary	42; 168,898 (69.9%)	72,701 (30.1%)	—	
March 3 (131)	52	Georgia primary	52; 291,905 (64.3%)	162,085 (35.7%)	—	
March 7	36	South Carolina primary	36; 99,558 (66.9%)	38,247 (25.7%)	11,035 (7.41%) (Note: David Duke got 10,553 (7.09%) votes)	
March 10 (Super Tuesday) (441)	99	Florida primary	67; 607,522 (68.1%)	32; 285,074 (31.9%)	–	
March 10 (Super Tuesday) (441)	41	Louisiana primary	25; 83,747 (62.0%)	11; 36,526 (27.0%)	5; 14,841 (Note: David Duke got 11,956 (8.85%) votes)	
March 10 (Super Tuesday) (441)	40	Massachusetts primary	28; 176,868 (65.6%)	12; 74,797 (27.7%)	24,182 (Note: David Duke got 5,557 (2.01%) votes)	
March 10 (Super Tuesday) (441)	34	Mississippi primary	25; 111,794 (72.3%)	6; 25,891 (16.7%)	4; 17,023 (10.6%) (Note: All votes for David Duke)	
March 10 (Super Tuesday) (441)	38	Oklahoma primary	27; 151,612 (69.6%)	11; 57,933 (26.6%)	8,176 (2.6%) (Note: David Duke got 5,672 (2.60%) votes)	
March 10 (Super Tuesday) (441)	16	Rhode Island primary	11; 9,853 (63.0%)	5; 4,967 (31.8%)	816 (4.9%) (Note: David Duke got 326 (2.08%) votes)	
March 10 (Super Tuesday) (441)	49	Tennessee primary	38; 178,216 (72.5%)	11; 54,585 (22.2%)	12,849 (5.2%) (Note: David Duke got 7,709 (3.14%) votes)	
March 10 (Super Tuesday) (441)	124	Texas primary	92; 556,280 (69.8%)	32; 190,572 (23.9%)	50,294 (6.0%) (Note: David Duke got 20,255 (2.54%) votes)	
March 17 (162)	88	Illinois primary	68; 556,280 (76.4%)	20; 186,915 (22.5%)	9,637 (1.2%) (Note: TBA)	
March 17 (162)	74	Michigan primary	54; 301,948 (67.2%)	20; 112,122 (25.0%)	35,063 (7.7%) (Note: David Duke got 10,688 (2.38%) votes)	
March 24	38	Connecticut primary	29; 66,356 (66.7%)	9; 21,815 (22.0%)	11,475 (11.4%) (Note: David Duke got 2,294 (2.30%) votes)	
April 5	20	Puerto Rico primary	20; 260,200	1,031	2,104	
April 7 (205)	31	Kansas primary	21; 132,131 (62.0%)	5; 32,494 (14.8%)	49,571 (20.8%) (Note: David Duke got 3,837 (1.80%) votes)	
April 7 (205)	34	Minnesota primary	25; 84,841 (63.9%)	9; 32,094 (24.2%)	15,821 (8.8%) (Note: TBA)	
April 7 (205)	103	New York [?]	103	–	–	
April 7 (205)	37	Wisconsin primary	30; 364,507 (75.6%)	7; 78,516 (16.3%)	39,225 (5.3%) (Note: David Duke got 12,867 (2.67%) votes)	
April 28	92	Pennsylvania primary	71; 774,865 (76.7%)	21; 233,912 (23.2%)	—	
May 5 (144)	13	District of Columbia primary	11; 4,265 (81.5%)	2; 970 (18.5%)	–	
May 5 (144)	20	Delaware caucus	20	—	—	
May 5 (144)	52	Indiana primary	42; 374,666 (80.1%)	10; 92,949 (19.9%)	—	
May 5 (144)	59	North Carolina primary	46; 200,387 (70.7%)	13; 55,420 (19.5%)	27,764 (9.8%) (Note: TBA)	
May 10	20	Montana primary	14; 65,176 (71.6%)	2; 10,701 (11.8%)	3; 15,098 (16.6%) (Note: TBA)	
May 12 (46)	27	Nebraska primary	23; 156,346 (81.4%)	4; 25,847 (13.5%)	9,905 (1.5%) (Note: David Duke got 2,808 (1.46%) votes)	
May 12 (46)	19	West Virginia primary	16; 99,994 (80.5%)	3; 18,067 (14.6%)	6,096 (4.9%) (Note: TBA)	
May 19 (62)	25	Oregon primary	17; 203,957	5; 57,730	3; 42,472 (Note: David Duke got 6,667 (2.19%) votes)	
May 19 (62)	37	Washington primary	25; 86,839 (67.0%)	4; 13,273 (10.2%)	8; 29,543 (20.8%) (Note: Nearly all of this vote was for Ross Perot as a write-in candidate. David Duke got 1,501 (1.16%) votes)	
May 26 (92)	31	Arkansas primary	27; 45,590 (83.1%)	4; 6,551 (11.9%)	2,742 (5.0%) (Note: TBA)	
May 26 (92)	23	Idaho primary	15; 73,297 (63.5%)	3; 15,167 (13.1%)	5; 27,038 (23.4%)	
May 26 (92)	38	Kentucky primary	28; 75,371 (74.5%)	—	10; 25,748 (25.5%)	
June 2 (439)	41	Alabama primary	33; 122,703 (74.3%)	12,588 (7.6%)	8; 29,830 (18.1%)	
June 2 (439)	203	California primary	149; 1,587,369 (73.6%)	54; 568,892 (26.4%)	—	
June 2 (439)	63	New Jersey primary	53; 240,535 (77.5%)	10; 46,432 (15.0%)	(7.5%) (Note: All votes for Ross Perot)	
June 2 (439)	27	New Mexico primary	19; 55,522 (63.8%)	7,871 (9.1%)	8; 23,574 (27.1%)	
June 2 (439)	20	North Dakota primary	17; 39,863 (83.4%)	—	3; 7,945 (16.6%) (Note: TBA)	
June 2 (439)	85	Ohio primary	71; 716,766	14; 143,687	—	
Total	1,973		1,544 9,199,463 (72.8%)	367 2,899,488 (23.0%)	62 497,650 (4.2%)	12,596,601

=== Nationwide ===
Popular vote result:

- George H. W. Bush (inc.) - 9,199,463 (72.84%)
- Pat Buchanan - 2,899,488 (22.96%)
- Unpledged delegates - 287,383 (2.28%)
- David Duke - 119,115 (0.94%)
- Ross Perot - 56,136 (0.44%)
- Pat Paulsen - 10,984 (0.09%)
- Maurice Horton - 9,637 (0.08%)
- Harold Stassen - 8,099 (0.06%)
- Jack Fellure - 6,296 (0.05%)

== See also ==
- 1992 Democratic Party presidential primaries
- George H. W. Bush 1992 presidential campaign
- Supermarket scanner moment
- David Duke 1992 presidential campaign
