= 1996 Iowa Republican presidential caucuses =

- February 12, 1996

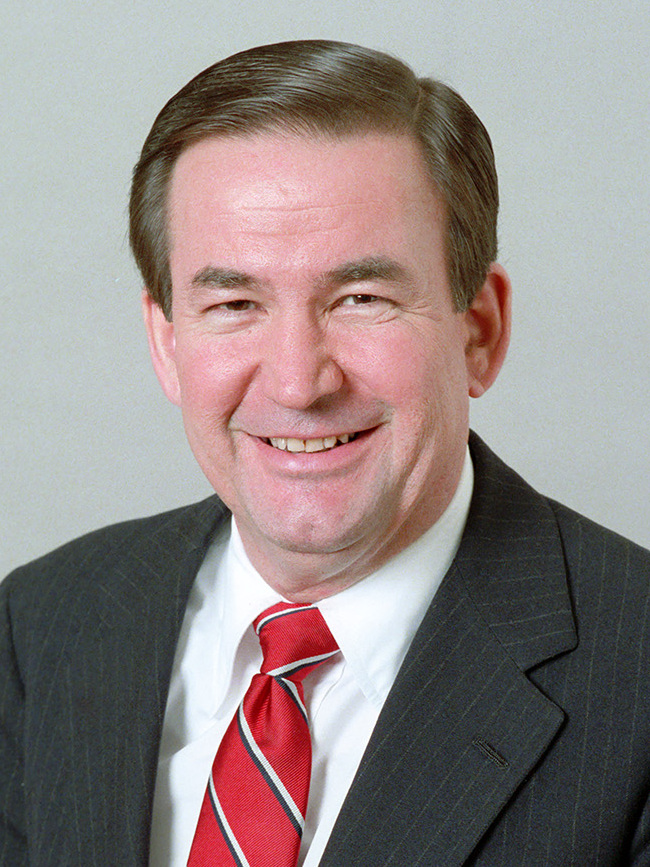

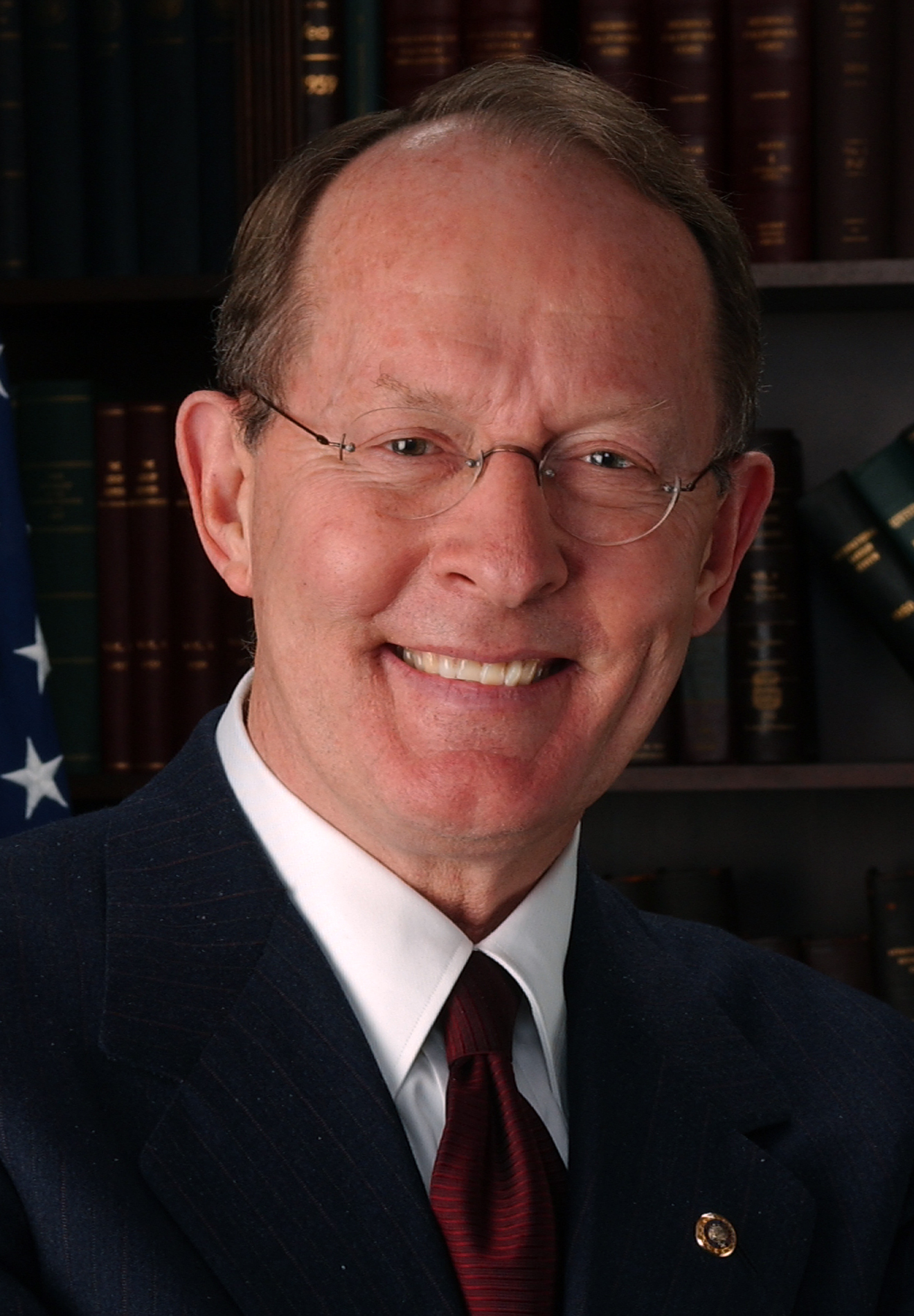

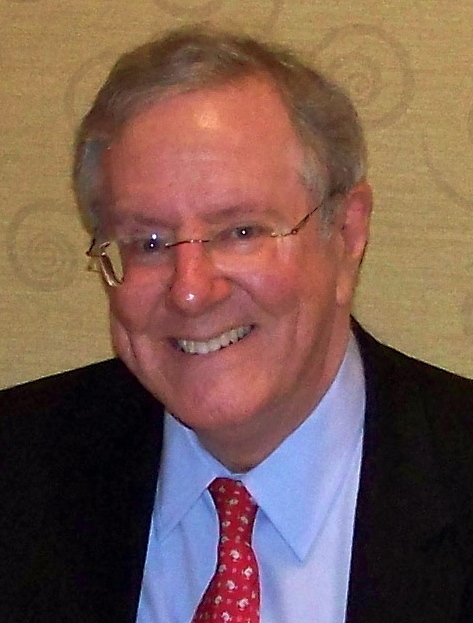

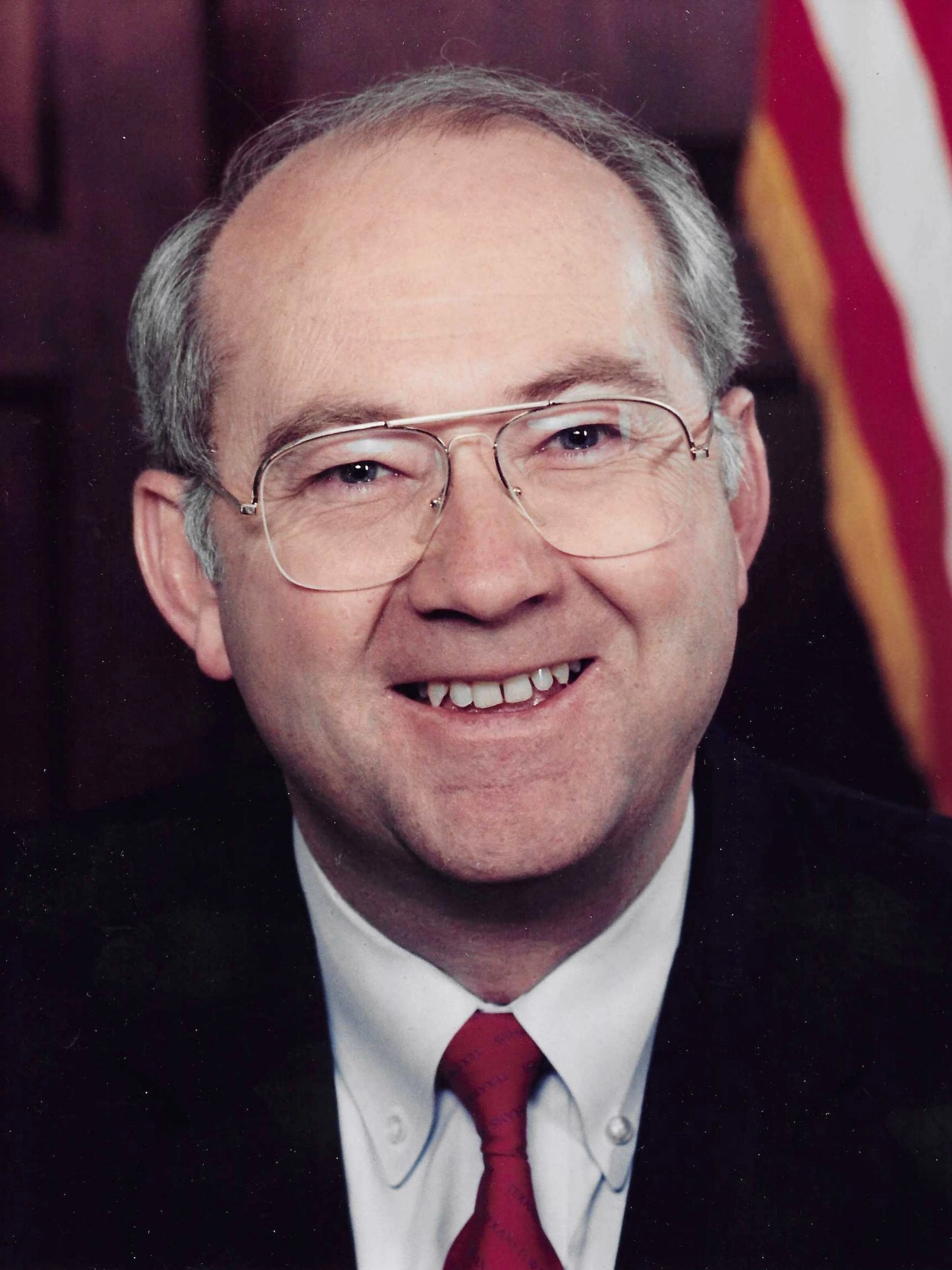

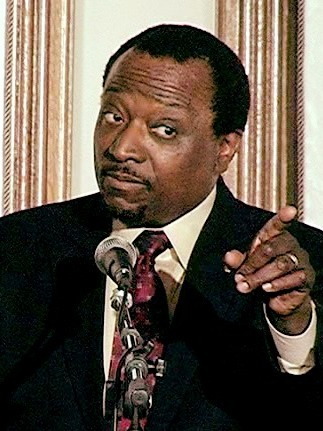
| Nominee | Bob Dole | Pat Buchanan | Lamar Alexander |
| Home state | Kansas | Virginia | Tennessee |
| Delegate count | 7 | 6 | 4 |
| Popular vote | 25,461 | 22,578 | 17,052 |
| Percentage | 26.31% | 23.33% | 17.62% |
| Nominee | Steve Forbes | Phil Gramm | Alan Keyes |
| Home state | New Jersey | Texas | Maryland |
| Delegate count | 3 | 2 | 2 |
| Popular vote | 9,861 | 9,055 | 7,219 |
| Percentage | 10.19% | 9.36% | 7.46% |
- Election results by county Dole: 20–30% 30–40% 40–50% Buchanan: 20–30% 30–40% 40–50% Alexander: 20–30%

The 1996 Iowa Republican presidential caucuses were held on February 12, 1996. The Iowa Republican caucuses are an unofficial primary, with the delegates to the state convention selected proportionally via a straw poll. The Iowa caucuses marked the traditional formal start of the delegate selection process for the 1996 United States presidential election.

Prior to the 1996 caucuses, as in previous election cycles with a competitive presidential race, an unofficial Ames Straw Poll was held, on August 19, 1995. The official one, electing delegates to the state convention, was held on February 12, 1996, the same day as the Democratic contest. In the Ames Straw Poll, Bob Dole and Phil Gramm tied with 24% of the vote each. In the February 1996 caucuses, Dole finished first with 26% of the vote.

== February 1996 procedure ==
Unlike the Democratic caucus, the Republican Party does not use voting rounds or have minimum requirements for a percent of votes. The Republican version is done with a straw vote of those attending the caucus. This vote is sometimes done by a show of hands or by dividing themselves into groups according to candidate. However, officially it is done with voters receiving a blank piece of paper with no names on it, and the voter writing a name and placing it in a ballot box.

Following the straw poll, delegates are then elected from the remaining participants in the room, as most voters leave once their vote is cast. All delegates are officially considered unbound, but media outlets either apportion delegates proportionally or apportion them in terms of winner-take-all by counties. In precincts that elect only one delegate, the delegate is chosen by majority vote and the vote must be by paper ballot. The state party strongly urges that delegates reflect the results of the preference poll, but there is no obligation that they do so.

== Ames Straw Poll ==
The 1996 Ames Straw Poll was held at Iowa State University (Ames)'s Hilton Coliseum on August 19, 1995. This was primarily a fundraising event for the state's Republican Party, and only Iowa residents who paid the $25 price for a ticket were eligible to vote. Tickets were available through the various presidential campaigns and the Iowa Republican Party's headquarters.

In general, the candidates bought large blocks of tickets and gave them out for free to whoever agreed to go and vote for that candidate. The candidates also rented buses to transport voters to Ames.

Bob Dole and Phil Gramm tied for the win with 24% of the vote each, followed by Pat Buchanan (18%), Lamar Alexander (11%), and Alan Keyes (8%). Five other candidates shared the remaining 15% of the vote.

== Campaign ==
Buchanan made opposition to concentrated animal feeding operations and intensive pig farming a central theme of his campaign in Iowa, citing opposition by Iowa family farmers.

== Results of the February 1996 caucuses ==
Because Iowa's delegates are not officially bound to candidates, the delegates given to each candidate below are rough estimates.

Iowa Republican caucuses, February 12, 1996
| Candidate | Votes | Percentage | Delegates |
|---|---|---|---|
| Bob Dole | 25,461 | 26.31% | 7 |
| Pat Buchanan | 22,578 | 23.33% | 6 |
| Lamar Alexander | 17,052 | 17.62% | 4 |
| Steve Forbes | 9,861 | 10.19% | 3 |
| Phil Gramm | 9,055 | 9.36% | 2 |
| Alan Keyes | 7,219 | 7.46% | 2 |
| Richard Lugar | 3,595 | 3.72% | 1 |
| Morry Taylor | 1,381 | 1.43% | 0 |
| Uncommitted | 431 | 0.45% | 0 |
| Robert K. Dornan | 129 | 0.13% | 0 |
| Total: | 96,762 | 100.0% | 25 |

Three candidates won majorities or pluralities in the individual counties: Bob Dole, Pat Buchanan, and Lamar Alexander. Buchanan used the momentum from his better-than-expected second-place showing in the Iowa caucuses to vault to a narrow win in the New Hampshire primary eight days later.

== See also ==
- Iowa caucuses
- 1996 Republican Party presidential primaries
