= American Life League =

American Catholic organization

American Life League, Inc.

- Location in Stafford County and in Virginia
- Successor: Life Amendment PAC; American Life Lobby
- Founded: April 1, 1979
- Tax ID no.: EIN: 52-1238301
- Purpose: Anti-abortion
- Location: Stafford, Virginia, U.S.
- Region served: United States
- Products: Literature
- Key people: Judith "Judie" A. Brown, President
- Revenue: $5,022,739 (2012)
- Expenses: $4,991,338 (2012)
- Website: All.org

American Life League, Inc. (ALL) is an American Catholic activist organization which opposes abortion, all forms of contraception, embryonic stem cell research, and euthanasia. Its current president is co-founder Judie Brown and its headquarters is in Stafford, Virginia.

== Projects and resources ==
Projects that American Life League has sponsored include:

- Celebrate Life Magazine is a bi-monthly 32-page magazine on topics including abortion, contraception, euthanasia, infertility and cloning.
- Marian Blue Wave is a call to Catholics across America to pray a weekly Rosary with the specific intentions of ending all surgical, pill, contraceptive and IVF abortion and shutting down every Planned Parenthood facility in the United States.
- Crusade for the Defense of Our Catholic Church in which ALL sought to persuade Catholics about its views on abortion, as well as name Catholic politicians who they say knowingly defy Church doctrine and statements by church officials regarding abortion rights. In 2004, ALL published a full-page advertisement in USA Today urging Catholic priests and bishops to deny Communion to Catholic legislators who support abortion rights. The League's slogan in this matter was "You can't be Catholic and pro-abortion."
- The Pill Kills discouraged people from using contraceptive medication, making claims about its effects on a woman's body as well as the effect that contraceptives have on fish once they enter the water supply. The Association of Reproductive Health Professionals said that ALL's claims regarding fish are "not supported by science".

== History ==
American Life League was founded on April 1, 1979 by Judie and Paul Brown, Gary Bauer, Focus on the Family’s James Dobson, and six other anti-abortion Americans after a schism with the National Right to Life Committee. Within less than a year of its founding, ALL had 68,000 members and received assistance founding ALL from Howard Phillips, publicity from The Heritage Foundation co-founder Paul Weyrich, and membership lists provided by right-wing direct mail specialist Richard Viguerie.

=== Street tactics ===
In 1994 ALL filed suit to challenge the Freedom of Access to Clinic Entrances Act. In American Life League v. Reno, ALL lost in the 4th Circuit Court of Appeals, and the United States Supreme Court refused to hear the case.

=== Disney boycotts ===
In March 1995, the American Life League boycotted the then-owners of Miramax, The Walt Disney Company, over the film Priest, in which a Roman Catholic priest deals with a variety of issues including his own homosexuality. Subsequently, ALL charged that Disney had concealed subliminal sexual messages in the animated films The Lion King, The Little Mermaid, and Aladdin. Disney denied all the claims. Snopes states the ALL claims about both Aladdin and The Little Mermaid are false. Their claim about The Lion King is listed by the site as "legend", indicating that the claim is "essentially unprovable".

=== Spending ===
In 2005, ALL was on Charity Navigator's list of highest paid CEOs, with one-third of its income spent on fundraising and administrative expenses and $699,857 (almost 9% of its income) paid out to its CEOs. As of 2019, the non-profit charity evaluator Charity Navigator awards ALL 2 out of 4 stars, a ranking indicating they believe the charity "needs improvement".

== See also ==
- Christian Voice (United States)
