= Judie Brown =

American activist (born 1944)

- Born: Judith Ann Brown née Limbourne; March 4, 1944 (age 82); Los Angeles, California, U.S.
- Education: St. Mary's Academy; Inglewood, California; El Camino Junior College; Alondra Park; A.A., 1963; University of California; Los Angeles, California; B.S., 1965
- Occupations: president of 501(c)(3) tax exempt organization author
- Employer(s): American Life League; 1991 - formerly American Life Lobby; 1976-1991; National Right to Life Committee, 1976 - 1979; Kmart, 1965 - 1968; Kresge's
- Opponent: Planned Parenthood
- Board member of: Pontifical Academy for Life; Catholic Scholars for Social Justice; Fellowship of Catholic Scholars; Children of God for Life
- Spouse: Paul A. Brown (m. 1967)
- Children: 3
- Website: all.org

Judith A. Brown (born March 4, 1944) is the president and co-founder of American Life League, the oldest Catholic grassroots anti-abortion organization in the United States.

== Early life and education ==
Brown was born in Los Angeles, on March 4, 1944. Her father abandoned his family a year and a half later, leaving her mother and her younger sister Sheila, who had just been born, to fend for themselves. Brown's mother remarried in 1952 to Chester Limbourne when she was six years old. Brown's grandparents took them in and were influential in molding her character and resolve, and her grandparents insured that she received the proper Catholic education and paid for her to attend St. Mary's Academy in Inglewood, California, an all-girls Catholic School run by the Sisters of St. Joseph of Carondelet.

After graduating St. Mary's Academy in 1962, Brown worked at Kresge's as a bookkeeper while attending El Camino Junior College in Alondra Park, California, where she earned an Associated Arts degree in 1963 and completed a bachelor's degree program at UCLA two years later.

== Career ==
=== Kmart ===
By the time she turned 21, Browne was an office manager for the Kmart western region. Brown was later transferred by Kmart Seattle, where she met a young man named Paul Brown who was interviewing for a retail job with Kmart. Judie Limbourne and Paul Brown were eventually married on December 30, 1967, in the same church in Hawthorne, California where Judie had received her First Holy Communion. Both of the Browns had worked for K-Mart at this time when she opted to stay home to begin a family. Their first child was Hugh Richard III born on November 23, 1968, followed by Catherine Marie.

In 1970, Brown began handing out anti-abortion literature at the request of her parish priest, and over the next several years, she became more and more involved in the anti-abortion movement. As her husband had been transferred by Kmart during 1973 to Savannah, Georgia, Brown got involved with helping organizers of the Georgia Right to Life stuff envelopes and mail out anti-abortion materials following the U.S. Supreme Court Roe vs. Wade decision. Her third child Christina Lee was born on June 19, 1974, and eight months later the Brown family moved with Kmart again, from Georgia to Kannopolis, North Carolina, and later to Steubenville, Ohio.

=== American Life League ===
With her husband Paul Brown having been transferred again by Kmart to the Washington, D.C., area in 1976, Brown began working with the National Right to Life Committee (NRLC). American Life League was founded on April 1, 1979 by Brown, her husband Paul, and eight other anti-abortion Americans after a schism with the National Right to Life Committee allowing for legal abortion in the case of rape, incest, and health of the mother. Brown reportedly stated in 1981 that the NRLC had been "trying to destroy my husband" by absorbing his Life Amendment Political Action Committee.

Within a month of her split with NRLC, she began the American Life Lobby (dormant since 1991) and the American Life League through contacts made by her husband who had previously founded the Life Amendment Political Action Committee or LAPAC. The stated purpose of the American Life League (ALL) was to promote anti-abortion positions to the public and Brown began developing ideas for ALL About Issues printed newsletter and within less than a year of its founding, ALL had 68,000 members and received assistance launching the organization from Howard Phillips, virtually free publicity from The Heritage Foundation co-founder Paul Weyrich, and the help of extensive membership lists provided by right-wing direct mail specialist Richard Viguerie.

The American Life Lobby that had begun in the basement of the Brown's residence had by September 1981 ALL moved into regular office space and earned legitimate notice on Capitol Hill during October of that year when ALL played a positive role in defeating the Hatch Amendments pertaining to the Human Life Amendment legislative proposals.

=== ALL street tactics ===
In 1994, ALL filed suit to challenge the Freedom of Access to Clinic Entrances Act. In American Life League v. Reno, ALL lost in the 4th Circuit Court of Appeals, and the United States Supreme Court refused to hear the case.

== Author ==
Brown has written 12 books, including an autobiography entitled Not My Will but Thine (2002), Saving Those Damned Catholics: A Defense of Catholic Teaching (2007), and her most recent The Broken Path: How Catholic Bishops Got Lost in the Weeds of American Politics (2011).

In 2013, Brown wrote a short booklet on Pope Francis, Pope Francis: Portrait of Holiness.
