= Eddie Råbock =

Swedish writer

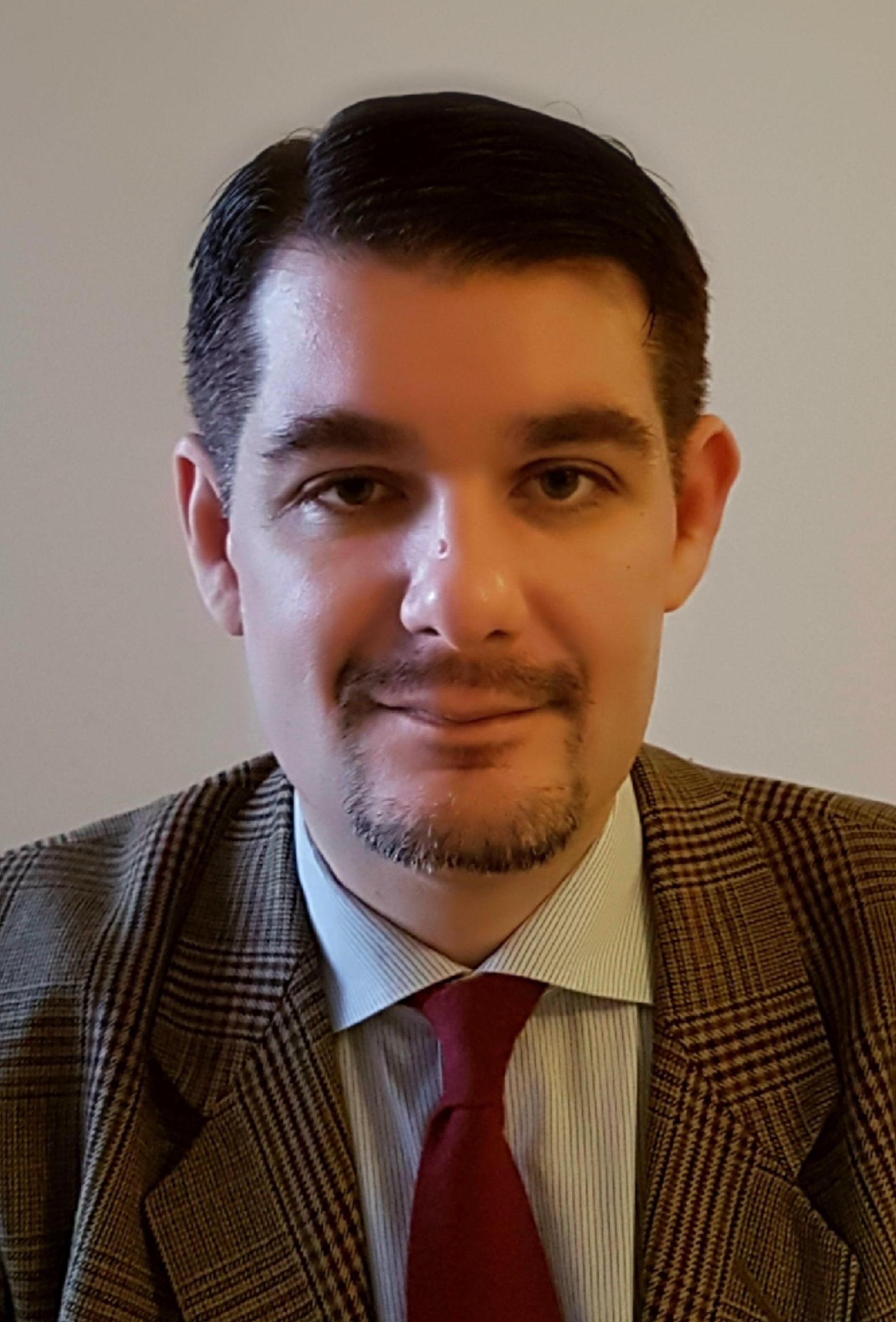
- Råbock in 2017
- Born: Jonas Mohamed Omar; 7 June 1976 (age 49); Uppsala, Sweden
- Occupations: Author; poet

Eddie Råbock (born Jonas Mohamed Omar; 7 June 1976) is a Swedish essayist, poet and literary critic of Swedish-Iranian origin. Råbock is the author of three collections of poetry. He was the editor of the Muslim journal Minaret from 2006 to 2008.

== Career and controversial turns ==
Råbock had a very promising and popular career at first, as a well-liked progressive writer and poet. He was a progressive Muslim who opposed islamism.

Then in 2009, as a reaction to, and becoming emotionally upset about, Israeli strikes against the Gaza Strip, he began describing himself as a "radical Muslim" and supporter of the Shia Islamist movements Hamas and Hezbollah, seeing the late Iranian leader Ruhollah Khomeini as a role model for Islamist resistance movements. He organized an anti-Israeli protest at Sergels torg in Stockholm on September 20, 2009, at Al-Quds day in which leading figures from the neo-Nazi organization Nordisk Ungdom attended and both Arabic, Iranian and Swedish attendees did Hitler salutes. He also befriended and interviewed Ahmed Rami, owner of the webpage and former radio show Radio Islam, who was convicted for hate speech against Jews in Sweden, and who denies the Holocaust openly. Rami's anti-Semitic books was distributed by the neo-Nazi party Nationalsocialistisk Front. Råbock's statements during this period included both homophobic rhetoric, and racist statements.

In an article in the newspaper Folket i Bild/Kulturfront, on July 17, 2012, he withdrew from his Islamist standpoint and retracted his antisemitic statements, saying, "I ask for forgiveness for having promoted anti-Semitic ideas". In the publication "En opieätares bekännelser" (Confessions of an opium-eater, referencing to Marx's famous quote about religion), he explains and develops his thoughts about his return to "tolerance and secularism".

He was for a while associated with the Communist Party (Sweden), but in 2017 he announced that he, as politically anti-Islamic nowadays, will vote for the anti-Islamic right Sweden Democrats (SD) in elections. He has continued to support SD since then.

In 2017, he changed his name by deed poll to Eddie Råbock.
