= My Awakening =

My Awakening may refer to:

- My Awakening: A Path to Racial Understanding 1998 autobiography by David Duke
- My Awakening (album), recording by American Jewish rock band Blue Fringe released in 2003

== See also ==
- Awakening (disambiguation)
