= Ego Tripping at the Gates of Hell =

EP by The Flaming Lips
- Released: November 18, 2003
- Recorded: 2003
- Genre: Indie rock
- Length: 33:12
- Label: Warner Bros.
- Producer: The Flaming Lips; Dave Fridmann; Scott Booker

The Flaming Lips EP chronology
Fight Test (2003)	Ego Tripping at the Gates of Hell (2003)	It Overtakes Me (2006)

Professional ratings
Review scores
Source	Rating
AllMusic	4/5 stars
Pitchfork	7/10
Robert Christgau	(dud)
Rolling Stone	2/5 stars
Uncut	4/5

Ego Tripping at the Gates of Hell is an EP by The Flaming Lips, released on Warner Bros. Records in late 2003.

Despite being named after the Yoshimi Battles the Pink Robots album track "Ego Tripping at the Gates of Hell", the song is not the lead track and does not even appear in its original form, but rather as two club-oriented remixes.

== Track listing ==
No.	Title	Length
1.	"Assassination of the Sun"	4:25
2.	"I'm a Fly in a Sunbeam (Following the Funeral Procession of a Stranger)"	3:13
3.	"Sunship Balloons"	4:04
4.	"Do You Realize??" (The Postal Service Remix)	4:02
5.	"Ego Tripping (Ego In Acceleration)" (Jason Bentley Remix)	5:32
6.	"Ego Tripping" (Self-Admiration with Blow-Up Mix)	6:34
7.	"A Change at Christmas (Say It Isn't So)"	5:17
