= Ahmed Rami =

Ahmed Rami may refer to:

- Ahmed Rami (poet) (1892–1981), Egyptian poet
- Ahmed Rami (writer) (born 1946), Swedish-Moroccan writer and Holocaust denier
