= Yoshimi Battles the Pink Robots, Pt. 1 =

"Yoshimi Battles the Pink Robots Pt. 1"

Single by The Flaming Lips

from the album Yoshimi Battles the Pink Robots
- B-side: "Yoshimi Battles The Pink Robots Pt. 1 (AOL Sessions)"
- Released: March 2003
- Recorded: June 2000–April 2002
- Genre: Indie rock, psychedelic rock, alternative rock
- Label: Warner Bros.
- Songwriter(s): Wayne Coyne, Steven Drozd, Michael Ivins, David Fridmann
- Producer(s): The Flaming Lips, Dave Fridmann, Scott Booker

The Flaming Lips singles chronology
| "Do You Realize??" (2002) | "Yoshimi Battles the Pink Robots Pt. 1" (2003) | "Fight Test" (2003) |

"Yoshimi Battles the Pink Robots Pt. 1" is a song by the American alternative rock band The Flaming Lips, released as the second single taken from their 2002 album Yoshimi Battles the Pink Robots. It reached #18 in the UK Singles Chart as the highest-charting single from the album, after which the band made its debut appearance on Top of the Pops.

It is also a playable song in Rock Band 3 and Fantasia: Music Evolved with 2 remixes: Mumbai and Grimecraft. It is also one of the band's most popular songs they have played live, and it usually is accompanied by a sing along at Coyne's urging. During a concert in early 2014, Miley Cyrus and Coyne appeared on stage and sang the song together.

== Track listing ==
=== DVD single ===
1. "Yoshimi Battles the Pink Robots, Pt. 1" (video)
2. "Yoshimi Battles the Pink Robots, Pt. 1"
3. "Fish Fry & The Bigot's Drunk"
4. "Galactic Melancholy"

=== UK CD1 ===
1. "Yoshimi Battles the Pink Robots, Pt. 1"
2. "Do You Realize??" (Scott Hardkiss Floating in Space Vocal Mix)
3. "Yoshimi Battles the Pink Robots, Pt. 1" (Japanese version)

=== UK CD2 ===
1. "Yoshimi Battles the Pink Robots, Pt. 1"
2. "Can't Get You Out of My Head" (KEXP version)
3. "Yoshimi Battles the Pink Robots, Pt. 1" (Sessions @ AOL version)

== Chart positions ==
| Chart (2003) | Peak position |
|---|---|
| UK Singles Chart | 18 |
