= Dov Rosenblatt =

American singer-songwriter

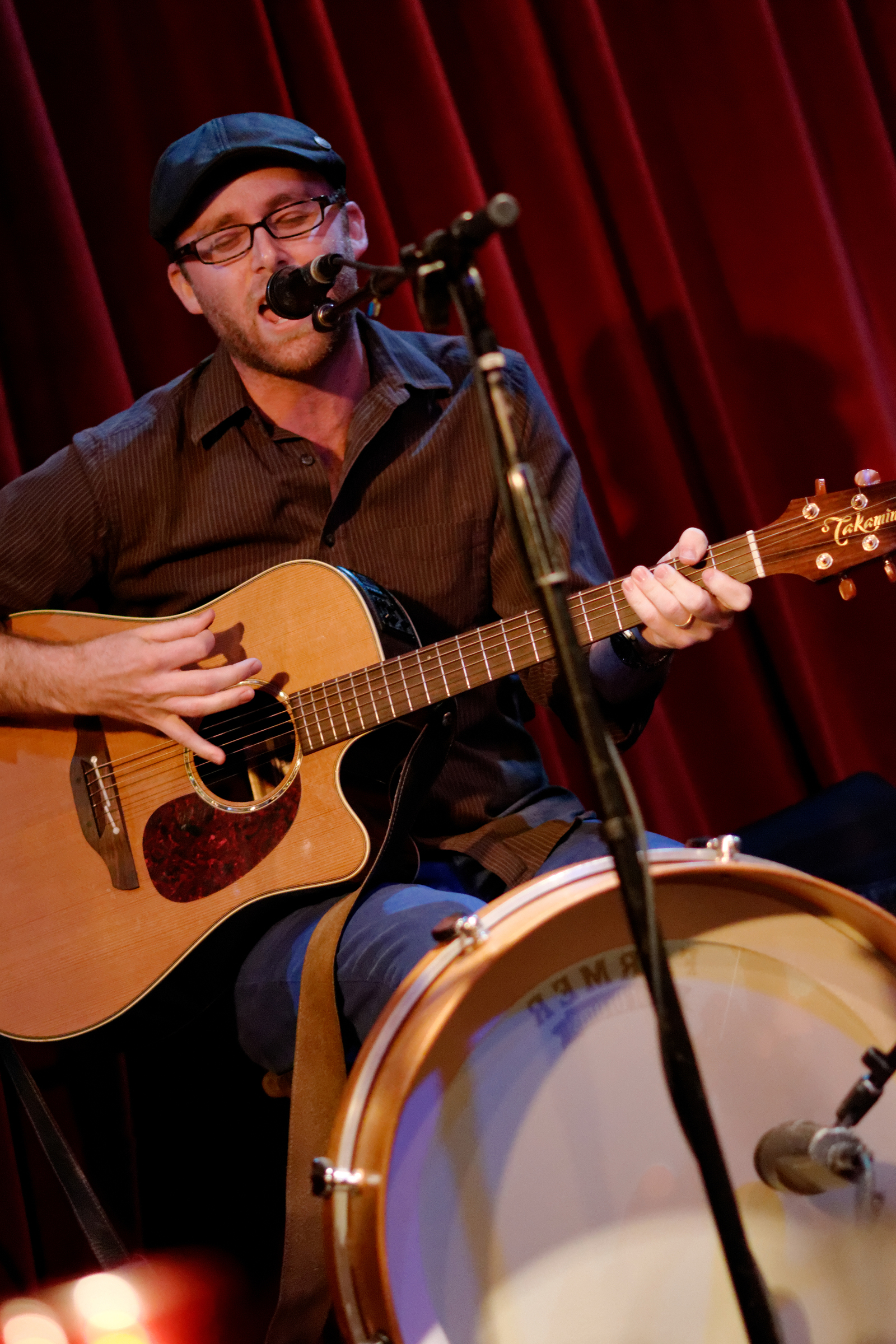
- Rosenblatt in 2013

Background information
- Born: Baltimore, Maryland, USA
- Genres: Jewish rock; indie rock; folk rock
- Occupations: Singer, songwriter, composer, producer
- Instruments: Vocals, guitar, piano, drums
- Years active: 2001–present
- Label: Sameach
- Member of: Distant Cousins; The Wellspring
- Formerly of: Blue Fringe; Fools for April

Dov Rosenblatt is an American singer, songwriter, producer, composer, and teacher. Currently based in Nashville, Tennessee, he is best known as the lead singer of the Jewish rock band Blue Fringe, who were credited along with Moshav and Soulfarm with advancing Jewish rock in the early 2000s. He has also been a member of the indie rock bands Fools for April (with C Lanzbom), The Wellspring (with Talia Osteen), and Distant Cousins (with Duvid Swirsky and Ami Kozak). His music has appeared in several films, television shows, and advertisements.

== Biography ==
=== Early life ===
Dov Rosenblatt grew up in Baltimore, Maryland. He is the son of Gary Rosenblatt, editor and publisher of The Jewish Week. His grandfather was the rabbi of a shul in Annapolis. Rosenblatt studied music and psychology at Yeshiva University.

=== Blue Fringe (2001-2009) ===
While at Yeshiva University, Rosenblatt was invited to perform at a Jewish event at the University of Pennsylvania and recruited three of his classmates, Avi Hoffman, Danny Zwillenberg, and Hayyim Danzig, as backing musicians. The four subsequently became a full-time band under the name Blue Fringe. Under this name, the group released three albums, My Awakening (2003), 70 Faces (2005), and The Whole World Lit Up (2007), the latter produced by C Lanzbom of Soulfarm.

=== Fools for April and The Wellspring (2009-2014) ===
Rosenblatt and Lanzbom briefly collaborated as Fools for April, recording an album together called The Voice is Inside (2009). A single from the album, "Run, Run, Run", received a music video directed by David Schlussel.

While touring with Fools for April, Rosenblatt met singer-songwriter Talia Osteen, with whom he formed the folk rock duo The Wellspring in 2009. They recorded three EPs and a full-length album, The Girl Who Cried Sheep (2014), produced by Eric Rosse. Music from the band has appeared on the shows House, Cougar Town, and Orange Is the New Black, and in the films Coffee Town (2013) and Slow Learners (2015).

=== Distant Cousins (2014-present) ===
In 2012, Rosenblatt formed Distant Cousins with Duvid Swirsky of Moshav and Ami Kozak. The group's self-titled debut EP was released in 2014. Their music has appeared in the film This Is Where I Leave You (2014); in the shows Graceland, Criminal Minds, and Reign; and in commercials for Lift and Macy's.

=== Other work ===
Rosenblatt teaches a course called "Understanding Tefillah Through Songwriting" at Shalhevet High School and New Community Jewish High School. In May 2016, he appeared in a video with actress Reese Witherspoon celebrating the one-year anniversary of her Draper James clothing line. He has appeared on the podcasts Faith Thru Music and Buckle Up.

== Personal life ==
Rosenblatt lives in Los Angeles with his wife Aura and son Kol. Raised Modern Orthodox, he is Lubavitch by marriage.

== Discography ==
=== Solo albums ===
- Your Faith in the Night (Emunatcha Baleilot) (2022)

=== Singles ===
Year	Song	Album
2022	"HaNeshama Lach (Soul)"	Your Faith in the Night (Emunatcha Baleilot)
2022	"Refa Na La"	Your Faith in the Night (Emunatcha Baleilot)

=== With Blue Fringe ===
- My Awakening (2003)
- 70 Faces (2005)
- The Whole World Lit Up (2007)

=== With Fools For April ===
- The Voice is Inside (January 10, 2009)

=== With The Wellspring ===
- The Girl Who Cried Sheep (2014)

=== With Distant Cousins ===
- Next of Kin (2019)

=== Solo appearances ===
- He appeared on the Rebel Spirit holiday compilation A Holiday Benefit, Vol. II (2008), performing a cover of "Ma'oz Tzur" with Rosi Golan and Deena Goodman.
- He appeared on the Pioneers for a Cure compilation The Am Yisrael Chai Collection (2009), performing a cover of "Hallelujah" by Avraham Shlonsky.
- Also in 2009, Rosenblatt and producer Diwon released a remix of the Israeli national anthem "Hatikvah" through Shemspeed. A live version subsequently appeared on another Pioneers for a Cure compilation, Israeli Songs to Fight Cancer Vol. 1 (2011).
- He was featured on Sameach Music and Jordan B. Gorfinkel's compilation Acapella Treasury: Yom Tov (2013), performing "Yom Tov Niggun" with Sam Glaser and Cantor Arik Wolheim.
