= 3-South =

American animated TV series

- Genre: Animated sitcom
- Created by: Mark Hentemann
- Directed by: Ron Hughart
- Starring: Brian Dunkleman; Brian Posehn; Mark Hentemann
- Opening theme: "Fight Test" by The Flaming Lips
- Composer: James L. Venable
- Country of origin: United States
- No. of seasons: 1
- No. of episodes: 13 (2 unaired)

Production
- Executive producers: Bill Freiberger; Mark Hentemann; Abby Terkuhle; Marian Davis
- Producer: Kara Vallow
- Editor: Rob DeSales
- Running time: 20–22 minutes
- Production companies: Hentemann Films; Warner Bros. Television Animation; MTV Animation

Original release
- Network: MTV
- Release: November 7, 2002 – February 1, 2003

3-South is an American adult animated sitcom created by Mark Hentemann for MTV. The show premiered on November 7, 2002, and ran for 11 episodes before being cancelled on February 1, 2003 with two episodes not airing.

== History ==
The series was created by Family Guy veteran writer Mark Hentemann during the show's hiatus, loosely based on Hentemann's college days at Miami University. It is the only animated series produced for MTV by Warner Bros. Animation; Skydance Corporation currently owns the series via Warner Bros. Animation and MTV. After 3-South was canceled after only one season due to low ratings likely caused by a lack of marketing by MTV that made it difficult for the series to attract an audience, Mark Hentemann would later go on to create Bordertown for Fox, which premiered on January 3, 2016 and was cancelled on May 22, 2016 after just one season due to low ratings and negative critical reception.

The show's theme song is The Flaming Lips' song "Fight Test" from the album Yoshimi Battles the Pink Robots.

The series has never had a home video release due to Warner Bros. and MTV failing to come to an agreement, but as of 2026, the entire show including the last two unaired episodes is available to watch for free on YouTube

== Premise ==
The show revolves around two lifelong dim-witted friends, named Sanford and Del, and their misadventures at the fictional Barder College. With the exception of their intelligent pre-med roommate Joe, nearly everyone at Barder is dumb and incompetent. Nonetheless, the idiotic, irresponsible, and thoughtless Sanford and Del are portrayed as the series' heroes, whereas the responsible, cynical, intelligent Joe is the de facto villain in most episodes.

== Main characters ==
- Sanford Reilly (voiced by Brian Dunkleman) – Sanford is an obese, oafish, highly insensitive loudmouth who shows little consideration for others. He has a very crude sense of humor, believing in the value of toilet humor and stupid pranks. As Del's best friend, he often takes the lead in their pointless adventures. In the episode Fraternity, he is revealed to be diabetic and has to take insulin for it.
- Del Swanson (voiced by Brian Posehn) – Del is Sanford's lifelong friend, similarly stupid, but more reserved and considerate. While Sanford is hopelessly dumb, Del shows a few glimpses of intelligence to his own surprise. He is extremely short and tends to have slightly better luck with women than Sanford ever does. Actor Brian Posehn gives Del a distinct low, droning voice, almost identical to the one used for Jim Kuback on the short-lived WB adult animated series Mission Hill.
- Joe Tate (voiced by Mark Hentemann) – The most intelligent and very miserable and most cynical student at Barder, Joe is forced to attend Barder College because he was unfortunately not accepted to Harvard (because Harvard had already filled their quota of white male students). He has aspirations of becoming a medical doctor, but is constantly at odds with Barder's idiotic students and the school's lacklustre facilities, including an extremely inept medical center run by an incompetent doctor. As Del and Sanford's roommate, he is forced to endure their rudeness and stupidity on a daily basis. He is often portrayed as the main antagonist of the show.
- Todd Wolfschmidtmansternowitz (voiced by Brian Posehn) – The R.A. of Del and Sanford's floor, Todd is a grotesque loser with a high, croaking voice and several medical conditions, including albinism. Todd has been pathetic his whole life, often mentioning his loud alcoholic father and inability to cope with ordinary problems. He is constantly ignored by the students on his floor despite his good intentions, and has a tendency to blindly follow rules and regulations.
- Ed Bickel (voiced by Mark Hentemann) – A hillbilly who lives on Todd's floor. Ed often hangs out with Del and Sanford and displays many stereotypical redneck habits, including a distinctly stupid laugh. Although just as dumb as everyone else, he sometimes provides helpful information and always has a cheerful demeanor.
- Dean Earhart (voiced by Jeffrey Tambor) – A Barder alumnus, Dean Earheart deals with the school's many failings on a daily basis. He is neurotic, dishonest, and hilariously incompetent at his job. He has a blonde female assistant named Linda, who serves as his voice-of-reason.
- Felicity (voiced by Lori Alan) – A girl who has a psychotic romantic crush Del that she has had since high school, and only enrolled in Barder in hopes to always be with him. Her dorm room is filled with photos of Del all over the place. At one point, Del had to file a restraining order against her only for her to injunct it thinking it was all a misunderstanding. She constantly rips off her own hair to make clothing for Del, in hopes that one day she'll marry Del and bear children with him. She constantly bickers with Sanford.
- Cindy Reilly (voiced by Kathleen Wilhoite) – Is Sanford's dim-witted, unattractive, alcoholic older sister, who's a junior at Barder. In the first episode, she spent the summer sobering up, only for one of her friends to give her a beer to celebrate, which gets her drunk all over again. A common running gag in the show is her getting hit by a car, as well as flashing her breasts. She has also been banned from eating in the cafeteria for her antics.
- Dr. Heminger – Barder College's doctor. He is not very helpful when it comes to helping the students on campus, and doesn't seem to know anything about his profession. He also abuses medication.

== Episodes ==
No.	Title	Written by	Original release date
1	"College Material"	Mark Hentemann	November 7, 2002
A pair of dimwitted lifelong friends Sanford Riley and Del Swanson move into their new dorm at the low-rent and anti-intellectual Barder College, where they must contend with their new, brainiac pre-med roommate, Joe (who is forced to attend there after Harvard filled their quota of white male students) and try to pass their first semester after unknowingly skipping all of their classes.
2	"Stomach Pump"	Dave Jeser & Matt Silverstein	November 14, 2002
Sanford becomes the "bitch" to a female bully after stealing her personalized T-shirt. Meanwhile, the lazy and hilariously incompetent Dean Earhart must boost interest in Barder College...and gets his wish when Joe volunteers to create a fully functional stomach pump for students suffering from alcohol poisoning. Joe later sabotages the stomach pump in an act of revenge causing it to explode after Dean Earhart erroneously takes all the credit.
3	"New Friends"	Pat Pujolas	November 21, 2002
Sanford fears that Del will become Mr. Popular after Del makes friends with the newspaper club.
4	"My Name is Todd W."	Bill Freiberger	November 28, 2002
Todd throws a party in an attempt at being cool, but after he spills beer on himself and falls out of a window (and onto Dean Earhart), Todd gets stripped of his R.A. duties and ends up in Alcoholics Anonymous, where he falls for Sanford's alcoholic sister Cindy.
5	"Del Gets Sick"	Reid Harrison	December 5, 2002
Del forgets his coat on his way to a campus football game and ends up with a nasty cold, which is worsened when Sanford takes his sick friend ice-fishing and throws a cigar-smoking party.
6	"Fraternity"	Mark Hentemann	December 12, 2002
Sanford and Del get tricked by a group of townies living off-campus into being pledges for a fictitious fraternity, but when the townies choose Del over Sanford, Sanford decides to join the Sigma Phi house—home to a psychotic frat brother named Randy Shaner.
7	"Coke Addicts"	Erik Sommers	December 19, 2002
Sanford and Del desperately try to get Coca Cola from a soda machine and resort to stealing from Joe's change jar. Meanwhile, Joe finds out from the university doctor that no one worthwhile has ever graduated from Barder College, and decides to take out his revenge on the school after being mugged by Shaner.
8	"Midnight Del"	Steve Callaghan	January 2, 2003
Barder College celebrates "The Midnight Yell" (a college tradition where students scream out their dorm windows to relieve stress from midterms), but Del ends up in trouble when he participates.
9	"Joe Gets Expelled"	Paul Fourie & Alan Cross	January 9, 2003
Joe sets up an interview to get transferred to another college, but blows it when he comes in high after accidentally eating Del and Sanford's slice of pizzas that has marijuana leaves on it and ends up getting permanently expelled from Barder after Dean Earhart catches Joe passed out on top of the polar bear on the Dean's diorama. Meanwhile, Sanford and Del are called upon by a stoner student named Berger to look after his marijuana plant (which he refers to as an oregano plant).
10	"100 Yr. Old Man"	Dave Lewman & Joe Liss	January 16, 2003
Dean Earhart attempts to bilk money out of a Barder College alumnus who won the lottery. Meanwhile, Sanford and Del steal Barder College's mascot: the 100-year-old "strapping young man", whose presence ensures Barder will beat the point-spread at football games.
11	"Top Dogs"	Dave Jeser & Matt Silverstein	February 1, 2003 (MTV2)
Sanford and Del get invited to a sorority party that ends up being a stunt called a "dog show" where sorority sisters bring in ugly men as their dates.
12	"Cock Tale"	Paul Fourie & Alan Cross	Unaired
Sanford and Del lose all their money in a poker game to Milo, and hold cockfights to make up the difference. Meanwhile, Joe finds a secluded study place and meets a college student named Max who, like Joe, is the only smart student in a university of idiots, and the two plot to expose Barder's seediness so they can rebuild the school as an intellectual paradise.
13	"Fake I.D."	Pat Pujolas	Unaired
A Nobel prize winner comes to Barder to give a speech but loses his wallet—which ends up in Sanford's possession, which he uses to score beer at a local bar.
