= Glayde Whitney =

American geneticist

- Born: 1939; Montana, United States
- Died: January 8, 2002 (aged 62–63); Tallahassee, Florida, United States
- Education: University of Minnesota
- Scientific career
- Fields: Behavior genetics
- Workplaces: Florida State University

Glayde D. Whitney (1939 – January 8, 2002) was an American behavioral geneticist and psychologist. He was professor at Florida State University. Beyond his work into the genetics of sensory system function in mice, in his later life he supported David Duke as well as research into race and intelligence and eugenics.

== Biography ==
Whitney was born in Montana and grew up in Minnesota. He earned his bachelor's degree from the University of Minnesota, as well as his doctorate from there in 1966. He then enlisted in the United States Air Force and served until 1969. He subsequently worked as a postdoctoral fellow at the Institute for Behavioral Genetics (University of Colorado at Boulder), under Gerald McClearn and John C. DeFries.

In 1970, Whitney was hired by Florida State University to represent behavioral genetics in the psychobiology program, where he stayed until his death at the age of 62 on January 8, 2002, after contracting a severe cold that aggravated emphysema. He considered himself to be a "Hubert Humphrey liberal."

== Academic work ==
Whitney was the author of over 60 papers on the genetics of taste sensitivity in inbred mice. Support for some of this work came from a Claude Pepper Award for Research Excellence from the National Institute on Deafness and Other Communication Disorders and in 1994 he received the Manheimer Lectureship Award from the Monell Chemical Senses Center, which recognizes career achievements of individuals in the chemosensory sciences. He was the president of the Behavior Genetics Association from 1994 to 1995.

By 1999, Whitney had shifted from studying mice to researching race and intelligence in humans. As part of this research, Whitney was supported by the Pioneer Fund, which has ties to scientific racism.

== Political views ==
Whitney was a frequent contributor to magazines such as Mankind Quarterly, The g Factor Newsletter, and The William McDougall Newsletter (named after eugenicist psychologist William McDougall). While outgoing president of the Behavior Genetics Association in 1995, some members of this group demanded his resignation after his presidential address suggested the need to investigate the possibility of genetic factors behind the high incidence of black crime in America.

Whitney wrote the foreword for My Awakening (1998), an autobiography by David Duke, a white nationalist politician and former National Director of the Knights of the Ku Klux Klan. In the book, Duke uses scientific racism to push for the re-segregation of schools. Whitney did not specifically endorse Duke's re-segregation plan, but described Duke as "a Moses-like prophet". Whitney compared Duke to Socrates, Galileo, and Newton and said the NAACP and other "front organisations" had been created to further Jewish interests.

Whitney said in a 1999 interview that the controversy distracted from what was meant to be a scientific discussion, saying "races are different for many genetic systems that influence everything from behavior and psychology to physiology, medicine and sports [...] Screaming nasty words does not change the reality." Following the publication of the book, faculty and students of FSU condemned Whitney's comments, with some calling for his resignation. The school rejected Whitney's position, but defended his right to teach as a matter of academic freedom. Whitney's views regarding race and intelligence prompted the Florida Senate to pass Resolution 2742 in 1999, "condemning the racism and bigotry espoused by Florida State University Professor Glayde Whitney."

Whitney acknowledged the scientific achievements of Jews, but accused "organized Jewry" of playing a prominent role in suppressing race behavioral genetics in response to racism directed toward them, resulting in a "dishonest and hypocritical version of egalitarianism."

Whitney was a member of the Institute for Historical Review, an organization promoting Holocaust revisionism, making a case that Jews invented the Holocaust for their own benefit.
