= 70 Faces =

Studio album by Blue Fringe
- Released: June 5, 2005
- Genres: Jewish rock, pop rock
- Length: 50:26
- Label: Sameach

Blue Fringe chronology
My Awakening (2003)	70 Faces (2005)	The Whole World Lit Up (2007)

70 Faces is the second studio album by the Jewish rock band Blue Fringe, released and distributed by Sameach Music on June 5, 2005. The title is a reference to Bamidbar Rabbah, which uses the phrase to explain the multifaceted nature of the Torah.

== Style and composition ==
70 Faces notably departs from the pop and adult contemporary sounds of My Awakening, instead incorporating blues, jazz, and funk elements similar to Shaggy and Jamiroquai, as well as alternative rock influences like Coldplay, Muse, and Radiohead.

Lyrically, the album features more original English lyrics than My Awakening, although Hebrew prayers and scripture are still invoked. "Lo Irah" and "Roll" deal with persecution, while "Modim" expresses thanks to God for life's successes. The R&B-influenced "Shidduch Song", which appeared on the previous album as a hidden track, satirizes the confusing customs of New York's shidduch scene. The final track, "Hineini", is a dark ballad about the binding of Isaac.

== Track listing ==
1. "Lo Irah" – 2:32
2. "Av Harachamim" – 3:43
3. "Modim" – 5:23
4. "Lifnei Adon" – 5:01
5. "Generations" – 3:50
6. "Shidduch Song" – 4:36
7. "Ein Mayim" – 4:14
8. "Shir Hashirim" – 6:30
9. "Roll" – 3:14
10. "70 Faces" – 3:48
11. "Hineini" – 5:49

== Personnel ==
Blue Fringe

- Dov Rosenblatt – lead vocals, rhythm guitar, songwriting
- Avi Hoffman – lead guitar
- Danny Zwillenberg – drums
- Hayyim Danzig – bass guitar
