= David Duke =

American white supremacist (born 1950)

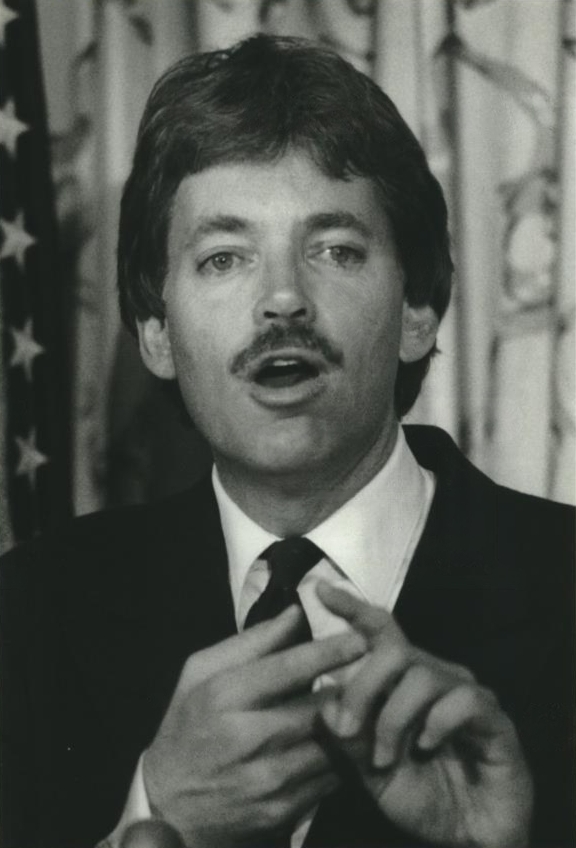
- Duke in 1989

Member of the Louisiana House of Representatives from the 81st district
- In office February 18, 1989 – January 13, 1992
- Preceded by: Chuck Cusimano
- Succeeded by: David Vitter

Grand Wizard of the Knights of the Ku Klux Klan
- In office 1974–1980
- Preceded by: Position established
- Succeeded by: Don Black

Personal details
- Born: David Ernest Duke; July 1, 1950 (age 76) Tulsa, Oklahoma, U.S.
- Party: Republican (1989–1999, 2016–present)
- Other political affiliations: Independent (2001–2016); Reform (1999–2001); Populist (1988–1989); Democratic (1975–1988); American Nazi (before 1975)
- Spouse: Chloê Hardin (m. 1974; div. 1984)
- Children: 2
- Education: Louisiana State University (BA); Interregional Academy of Personnel Management (Kandidat nauk in History)

David Ernest Duke (born July 1, 1950) is an American white supremacist, neo-Nazi, conspiracy theorist, former politician and grand wizard of the Knights of the Ku Klux Klan. From 1989 to 1992, he was a Republican member of the Louisiana House of Representatives. His politics and writings are largely devoted to promoting conspiracy theories about Jews, such as Holocaust denial and Jewish control of academia, the press, and the financial system. In 2013, the Anti-Defamation League called Duke "perhaps America's most well-known racist and anti-Semite".

Duke unsuccessfully ran as a Democratic candidate for state legislature during the 1970s and 1980s, culminating in his campaign for the 1988 Democratic presidential nomination. After failing to gain any traction within the Democratic Party, he gained the presidential nomination of the minor Populist Party. In December 1988, he became a Republican and claimed to have become a born-again Christian, nominally renouncing antisemitism and racism. He soon won his only elected office, a seat in the Louisiana House of Representatives. He then ran unsuccessful but competitive campaigns for several more offices, including United States Senate in 1990 and governor of Louisiana in 1991. His campaigns were denounced by national and state Republican leaders, including President George H. W. Bush. He mounted a minor challenge to President Bush in 1992.

By the late 1990s, Duke had abandoned his pretense of rejecting racism and antisemitism, and began to openly promote racist and neo-Nazi viewpoints. He then began to devote himself to writing about his political views, both in newsletters and later on the Internet. In his writings, he maligns African Americans and other ethnic minorities, and promotes conspiracy theories about a Jewish plot to control the United States and the world. He continued to run for public office through 2016, but after his reversion to open neo-Nazism, his candidacies were not competitive.

During the 1990s, Duke defrauded his political supporters by pretending to be in dire financial straits and soliciting money for basic necessities. At the time, he was in fact financially secure and used the money for recreational gambling. In December 2002, Duke pleaded guilty to felony fraud and subsequently served a 15-month sentence at the Federal Correctional Institution, Big Spring, in Texas.

== Early life ==
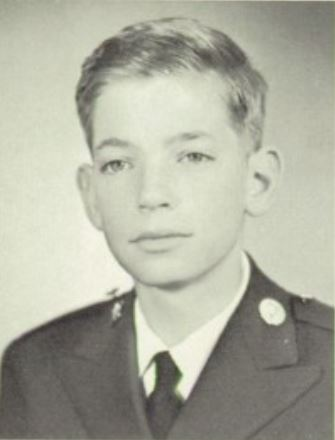
Duke as a teenager

David Ernest Duke was born on July 1, 1950, in Tulsa, Oklahoma, to Maxine (née Crick) and David Hedger Duke, the younger of two children. As the son of an engineer for Shell Oil Company, Duke frequently moved with his family around the world. During 1954, they lived a short time in the Netherlands before settling in an all-white area of New Orleans, Louisiana, in 1955. His mother was an alcoholic; his father permanently left the family in 1966 for Laos, taking a job with United States Agency for International Development (USAID). While in New Orleans, Duke attended the Clifton L. Ganus School, a conservative Church of Christ-sponsored school. He said his segregationist "awakening" started during his research for an eighth-grade project at this school. After his freshman year, Duke transferred to Warren Easton Senior High in New Orleans. For his junior year, he attended Riverside Military Academy in Gainesville, Georgia. His senior year, he attended John F. Kennedy High School, and by the time he graduated was already a member of the Ku Klux Klan.

In 1964, Duke began his involvement in radical right politics after attending a Citizens' Councils (CCA) meeting and reading Carleton Putnam's pro-segregation books, later citing Race and Reason: A Yankee View as responsible for his "enlightenment". Putnam's book asserted the genetic superiority of whites. Also during his adolescence, Duke began to read books about Nazism and the Third Reich, and his speeches at CCA meetings became more explicitly pro-Nazi. This was enough to gain him disapproval from some members, who were more anti-black racists than antisemitic. While attending Riverside Military Academy, his class was disciplined after Duke was found to be in possession of a Nazi flag and, in public school, he vociferously protested against the lowering of the flag after the assassination of Martin Luther King Jr. In the late 1960s, Duke met the white supremacist William Luther Pierce, who became an influence on him. Duke joined the Ku Klux Klan (KKK) in 1967.

In 1968, Duke enrolled at Louisiana State University (LSU) in Baton Rouge. In 1970, he formed a white student group called the White Youth Alliance that was affiliated with the National Socialist White People's Party (NSWPP). He appeared at a demonstration in Nazi uniform carrying a sign reading "Gas the Chicago 7" (a group of left-wing anti-war activists William Kunstler had defended) and "Kunstler is a Communist Jew" to protest Kunstler's appearance at Tulane University in New Orleans. Picketing and holding parties on the anniversary of Adolf Hitler's birth, he became known on the LSU campus for wearing a Nazi uniform. While a student at LSU, Duke took a road trip to an NSWPP conference in Virginia with white supremacists Joseph Paul Franklin (later convicted of multiple acts of racial and antisemitic terrorism and executed for serial murder) and Don Black.

Duke says that he spent nine months in Laos, calling it a "normal tour of duty". He joined his father, who remained working there, and had asked his son to visit during the summer of 1971. His father helped him gain a job teaching English to Laotian military officers, from which he was dismissed after six weeks when he drew a Molotov cocktail on the blackboard. He also claimed to have gone behind enemy lines 20 times at night to drop rice to anti-communist insurgents in planes flying 10 feet (3.0 m) off the ground, narrowly avoiding a shrapnel wound. Two Air America pilots who were in Laos at that time said that the planes flew only during the day and no less than 500 feet (150 m) from the ground. One pilot suggested that it might have been possible for Duke to have gone on a safe "milk run" once or twice but no more than that. Duke didn't name the airfield he had used.

=== 1972 arrest in New Orleans ===
In January 1972, Duke was arrested in New Orleans for inciting a riot. Several racial confrontations broke out that month in the city, including one at the Robert E. Lee Monument involving Duke, Addison Roswell Thompson—a perennial segregationist candidate for governor of Louisiana and mayor of New Orleans—and his 89-year-old friend and mentor, Rene LaCoste. Thompson and LaCoste dressed in Klan robes for the occasion and placed a Confederate flag at the monument. The Black Panthers began throwing bricks at the two men, but police arrived in time to prevent serious injury.

In 1972, Duke was charged with soliciting campaign funds for presidential candidate George Wallace and keeping the proceeds. He was also charged with filling glass containers with a flammable liquid, banned under a New Orleans ordinance. Both charges were eventually dropped.

=== Knights of the Ku Klux Klan ===
David Duke in 1978

In 1974, Duke founded the Louisiana-based Knights of the Ku Klux Klan (KKKK), shortly after graduating from LSU. He became the KKKK's "grand wizard" in 1976. Duke first received broad public attention during this time, as he endeavored to market himself in the mid-1970s as a new brand of Klansman: well-groomed, engaged, and professional. He also reformed the organization, promoting nonviolence and legality; also, for the first time in the Klan's history, women were accepted as equal members and Catholics were encouraged to apply for membership. Duke repeatedly insisted that the Klan was "not anti-black" but rather "pro-white" and "pro-Christian". He told the Daily Telegraph newspaper that he left the Klan in 1980 because he disliked its associations with violence and could not stop members of other Klan chapters from doing "stupid or violent things". In April 1992, Julia Reed wrote in The New York Review of Books that Duke was forced to leave the Klan after selling a copy of its membership records to a rival Klan leader who was a Federal Bureau of Investigation informer.

== Political and ideological activities ==
=== Early campaigns ===
Duke first ran for a seat in the Louisiana State Senate as a Democrat from a Baton Rouge district in 1975. During his campaign, he was allowed to speak on the college campuses of Vanderbilt University, Indiana University, the University of Southern California, Stanford University, and Tulane University. He received 11,079 votes, one-third of those cast.

Duke ran for a seat in the state senate again in 1979, losing to the incumbent, Joe Tiemann.

In the late 1970s, several Klan officials accused Duke of stealing the organization's money. "Duke is nothing but a con artist", Jack Gregory, Duke's Florida state leader, told the Clearwater Sun after Duke allegedly refused to turn over proceeds from a series of 1979 Klan rallies to the Knights. Another Klan official under Duke, Jerry Dutton, told reporters that Duke had used Klan funds to purchase and refurbish his home in Metairie. Duke later justified the repairs by saying most of his home was used by the Klan.

He ran for the Democratic presidential nomination during the 1980 presidential election. Despite being six years too young to be president, Duke attempted to place his name on the ballot in 12 states, saying he wanted to be a power broker who could "select issues and form a platform representing the majority of this country" at the Democratic National Convention. In 1979, he pleaded guilty to disturbing the peace when he led 70 to 100 Klansmen to surround police vehicles in a Metairie hotel parking lot in September 1976, and was fined $100 and given a three-month suspended sentence. Duke and James K. Warner had originally been convicted on that charge in 1977, but the Louisiana Supreme Court had reversed the ruling because the state had introduced inadmissible evidence. Duke was arrested for illegally entering Canada in order to discuss third-world immigration into Canada on a talk show.

He left the Ku Klux Klan in 1980, after he was accused of trying to sell the organization's mailing list for $35,000. He founded the National Association for the Advancement of White People and served as its president after leaving the Klan. Using the group's newsletter, he promoted Holocaust denial literature for sale such as The Hoax of the Twentieth Century and Did Six Million Really Die?

Duke allegedly conducted a direct-mail appeal in 1987, using the identity and mailing-list of the Georgia Forsyth County Defense League without permission. League officials described it as a fundraising scam.

=== 1988 presidential campaign ===
In 1988, Duke ran initially in the Democratic presidential primaries. His campaign had limited impact, with one minor exception — as the only candidate on the ballot, he won the little-known New Hampshire vice presidential primary. Duke, having failed to gain much traction as a Democrat, then sought and gained the presidential nomination of the Populist Party, an organization founded by Willis Carto. He appeared on the ballot for president in 11 states and was a write-in candidate in some other states, some with Trenton Stokes of Arkansas for vice president, and on other state ballots with Floyd Parker, a physician from New Mexico, for vice president. He received 47,047 votes, or 0.04% of the national popular vote.

=== 1989: Successful run in special election for Louisiana House seat ===
In December 1988, Duke changed his political affiliation from the Democratic Party to the Republican Party.

In 1988, Republican state representative Chuck Cusimano of Metairie resigned his District 81 seat to become a 24th Judicial District Court judge, and a special election was called early in 1989 to select a successor. Duke entered the race to succeed Cusimano and faced several opponents, including fellow Republicans John Spier Treen, a brother of former governor David C. Treen; Delton Charles, a school board member; and Roger F. Villere Jr., who operates Villere's Florist in Metairie. Duke finished first in the primary with 3,995 votes (33.1%). As no one received a majority of the vote in the first round, a runoff election was required between Duke and Treen, who polled 2,277 votes (18.9%) in the first round of balloting. Treen's candidacy was endorsed by U.S. president George H. W. Bush, former president Ronald Reagan, and other prominent Republicans, as well as Democrats Victor Bussie (president of the Louisiana AFL–CIO) and Edward J. Steimel (president of the Louisiana Association of Business and Industry and former director of the "good government" think tank, the Public Affairs Research Council). Duke criticized Treen for a statement he had made indicating willingness to entertain higher property taxes, anathema in that suburban district. With 8,459 votes (50.7%), Duke defeated Treen, who polled 8,232 votes (49.3%). He served in the House from 1989 until 1992.

Freshman legislator Odon Bacqué of Lafayette, a No Party member of the House, stood alone in 1989 when he attempted to deny seating to Duke on the grounds that the incoming representative had resided outside his district at the time of his election. When Treen failed in a court challenge in regard to Duke's residency, the latter was seated. Lawmakers who opposed Duke said that they had to defer to his constituents, who narrowly chose him as representative.

=== As state representative ===
Duke took his seat on the same day as Jerry Luke LeBlanc of Lafayette Parish (who won another special election, held on the same day as the Duke-Treen runoff, to choose a successor to Kathleen Blanco, the future governor who was elected to the Louisiana Public Service Commission). Duke and LeBlanc were sworn in separately.

Colleague Ron Gomez of Lafayette stated that Duke, as a short-term legislator, was "so single minded, he never really became involved in the nuts and bolts of House rules and parliamentary procedure. It was just that shortcoming that led to the demise of most of his attempts at lawmaking."

One legislative issue pushed by Duke was the requirement that welfare recipients be tested for the use of narcotics. The recipients had to show themselves to be drug-free to receive state and federal benefits under his proposal. Gomez, in his 2000 autobiography, said that he recalls Duke obtaining the passage of only a single bill, legislation which prohibited movie producers or book publishers from compensating jurors for accounts of their court experiences.

Duke launched unsuccessful campaigns for the U.S. Senate in 1990 and governor in 1991.

=== 1990 campaign for U.S. Senate ===
Though Duke had first hesitated about entering the Senate race, he made his announcement of candidacy for the nonpartisan blanket primary held on October 6, 1990. Duke was the only Republican in competition against three Democrats, including incumbent U.S. senator J. Bennett Johnston, Jr., of Shreveport, whom Duke derided as "J. Benedict Johnston".

Former governor David Treen, whose brother, John Treen, Duke had defeated for state representative in 1989, called Duke's senatorial platform "garbage. ... I think he is bad for our party because of his espousal of Nazism and racial superiority."

The Republican Party officially endorsed state senator Ben Bagert of New Orleans in a state convention on January 13, 1990, but national GOP officials in October, just days before the primary election, concluded that Bagert could not win. To avoid a runoff between Duke and Johnston, the GOP decided to surrender the primary to Johnston. Funding for Bagert's campaign was halted, and after initial protest, Bagert dropped out two days before the election. With such a late withdrawal, Bagert's name remained on the ballot, but his votes, most of them presumably cast as absentee ballots, were not counted. Duke received 43.51% (607,391 votes) of the primary vote to Johnston's 53.93% (752,902 votes).

Duke's views prompted some of his critics, including Republicans such as journalist Quin Hillyer, to form the Louisiana Coalition Against Racism and Nazism, which directed media attention to Duke's statements of hostility to blacks and Jews.

In a 2006 Financial Times editorial, Gideon Rachman recalled interviewing Duke's 1990 campaign manager, who said, "The Jews just aren't a big issue in Louisiana. We keep telling David, stick to attacking the blacks. There's no point in going after the Jews, you just piss them off and nobody here cares about them anyway."

=== 1991 campaign for governor of Louisiana ===
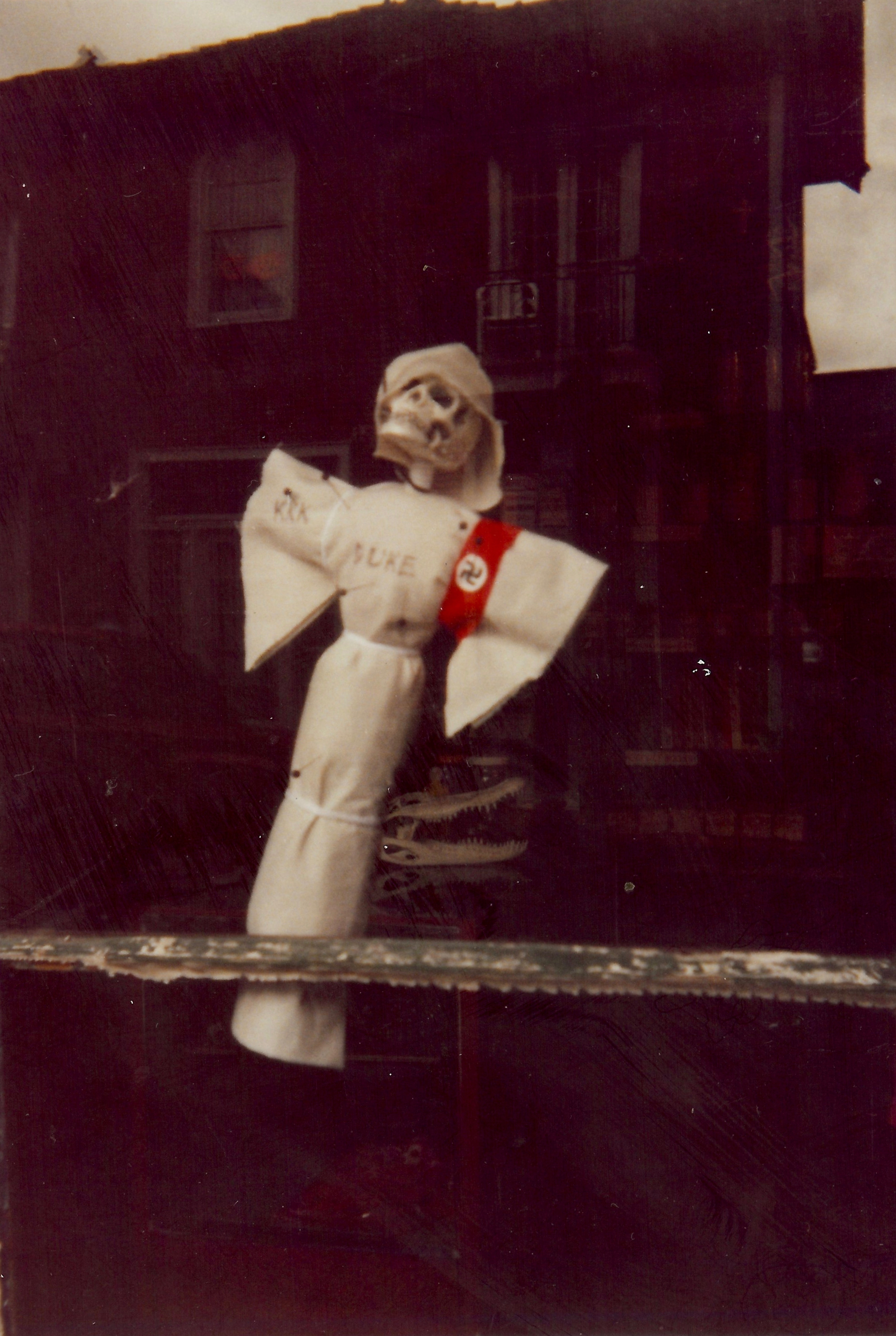
Anti-David Duke voodoo doll on display in New Orleans during his gubernatorial campaign

Despite repudiation by the Republican Party, Duke ran for governor of Louisiana in 1991. In the primary, he finished second to former governor Edwin W. Edwards; thus, he faced Edwards in a runoff. In the initial round, Duke received 32% of the vote. Incumbent governor Buddy Roemer, who had switched from the Democratic to the Republican Party during his term, came in third with 27% of the vote. Although Duke had a sizable core constituency of devoted supporters, many voted for him as a "protest vote" to register dissatisfaction with Louisiana's establishment politicians. In response to criticism for his past white supremacist activities, Duke's stock response was to apologize for his past and declare that he was a born-again Christian. During the campaign, he said he was the spokesman for the "white majority" and, according to The New York Times, "equated the extermination of Jews in Nazi Germany with affirmative action programs in the United States".

The Christian Coalition of America, which exerted considerable impact on the Republican State Central Committee, was led in Louisiana by its national director and vice president, Billy McCormack, then the pastor of University Worship Center in Shreveport. The coalition was accused of having failed to investigate Duke in the early part of his political resurgence. But by the 1991 gubernatorial election, its leadership had withdrawn support for Duke. Despite Duke's status as the only Republican in the runoff, incumbent president George H. W. Bush opposed his candidacy and denounced him as a charlatan and a racist. White House chief of staff John H. Sununu said, "The president is absolutely opposed to the kind of racist statements that have come out of David Duke now and in the past."

The Louisiana Coalition Against Racism and Nazism rallied against Duke's gubernatorial campaign. Elizabeth Rickey, a moderate member of the Louisiana Republican State Central Committee and niece of Branch Rickey, began to follow Duke to record his speeches and expose what she saw as instances of racist and neo-Nazi remarks. For a time, Duke took Rickey to lunch, introduced her to his daughters, telephoned her late at night, and tried to convince her of his beliefs, including that the Holocaust was a myth, Auschwitz physician Josef Mengele was a medical genius, and that blacks and Jews were responsible for various social ills. Rickey released transcripts of their conversations to the press and also provided evidence establishing that Duke sold Nazi literature (such as Mein Kampf) from his legislative office and attended neo-Nazi political gatherings while he held elective office.

Between the primary and the runoff, called the "general election" under Louisiana election rules (in which all candidates run on one ballot, regardless of party), white supremacist organizations from around the country contributed to Duke's campaign fund.

Duke's rise garnered national media attention. While he gained the backing of former Alexandria mayor John K. Snyder, Duke won few serious endorsements in Louisiana. Celebrities and organizations donated thousands of dollars to former governor Edwin Edwards' campaign. Referencing Edwards' long-standing problem with accusations of corruption, popular bumper stickers read: "Vote for the Crook. It's Important", and "Vote for the Lizard, not the Wizard." When a reporter asked Edwards what he needed to do to triumph over Duke, Edwards replied with a smile: "Stay alive."

The runoff debate, held on November 6, 1991, received significant attention when journalist Norman Robinson questioned Duke. Robinson, who is African American, told Duke that he was "scared" by the prospect of Duke winning the election because of his history of "diabolical, evil, vile" racist and antisemitic comments, some of which he read to Duke. He then pressed Duke for an apology and when Duke protested that Robinson was not being fair to him, Robinson replied that he did not think Duke was being honest. Jason Berry of the Los Angeles Times called it "startling TV" and the "catalyst" for the "overwhelming" turnout of black voters who helped Edwards defeat Duke.

Edwards received 1,057,031 votes (61.2%), while Duke's 671,009 votes represented 38.8% of the total. Duke nevertheless claimed victory, saying, "I won my constituency. I won 55% of the white vote", a statistic confirmed by exit polls. Duke, rather than Edwards, was on network television the following day; his rival refused to appear with him.

=== 1992 Republican Party presidential candidate ===
Vote percentage received by David Duke in the 1992 Republican primary by state or territory

Duke ran as a Republican in the 1992 presidential primaries, although Republican Party officials tried to block his participation. He received 119,115 (0.94%) votes in the primaries, but no delegates to the 1992 Republican National Convention.

Claiborne Darden, an Atlanta pollster, stated that "there is no question that Duke would have done better if Buchanan had not gotten into the race," and Duke stated that "the publicity went to Buchanan". At the time Duke ended his campaign he had around $60,000 in debt.

A 1992 documentary film, Backlash: Race and the American Dream, investigates Duke's appeal among some white voters. It explores the demagogic issues of Duke's platform, examining his use of black crime, welfare, affirmative action and white supremacy, and tying Duke to a legacy of other white backlash politicians, such as Lester G. Maddox and George Wallace, and the use in the successful 1988 presidential campaign of George H. W. Bush of these same racially themed hot buttons.

=== 1996 campaign for U.S. Senate ===
When Johnston announced his retirement in 1996, Duke ran again for the U.S. Senate. He polled 141,489 votes (11.5%). Former Republican state representative Woody Jenkins of Baton Rouge and Democrat Mary Landrieu of New Orleans, the former state treasurer, went into the general election contest. Duke was fourth in the nine-person, jungle primary race.

=== 1999 campaign for U.S. House ===
A special election was held in Louisiana's First Congressional District following the sudden resignation of Republican incumbent Bob Livingston in 1999. Duke sought the seat as a Republican and received 19% of the vote. He finished a close third, thus failing to make the runoff. His candidacy was repudiated by the Republicans. Republican Party chairman Jim Nicholson remarked: "There is no room in the party of Lincoln for a Klansman like David Duke." Republican state representative David Vitter (later a U.S. senator) defeated former governor Treen. Also in the race was the New Orleans Republican leader Rob Couhig.

=== New Orleans Protocol ===
Duke organized a weekend gathering of "European Nationalists" in Kenner, Louisiana. In an attempt to overcome the splintering and division in the white nationalist movement that had followed the 2002 death of leader William Luther Pierce, Duke presented a unity proposal for peace within the movement and a better image for outsiders. His proposal was accepted and is now known as the New Orleans Protocol. It pledges adherents to a pan-European outlook, recognizing national and ethnic allegiance, but stressing the value of all European peoples. Signed by and sponsored by a number of white supremacist leaders and organizations, it has three provisions: 1. Zero tolerance for violence. 2. Honorable and ethical behavior in relations with other signatory groups. This includes not denouncing others who have signed this protocol. In other words, no enemies on the right. 3. Maintaining a high tone in our arguments and public presentations.

Those who signed the pact on May 29, 2004, include Duke, Don Black, Paul Fromm, Willis Carto (whose Holocaust-denying The Barnes Review helped sponsor the event), Kevin Alfred Strom, and John Tyndall (signing as an individual, not on behalf of the British National Party).

The Southern Poverty Law Center (SPLC) said that the NOP's "high tone" contrasts with statements at the event where the pact was signed, such as Paul Fromm's calling a Muslim woman "a hag in a bag" and Sam Dickson (from the Council of Conservative Citizens, another sponsor) speaking about the "very, very destructive" effect of opposing the Nazis in World War II—opposition that caused people to view Hitler's "normal, healthy racial values" as evil. The SPLC called the NOP a "smokescreen", saying that "most of the conference participants' ire was directed at what they consider to be a worldwide Jewish conspiracy to destroy the white race through immigration and miscegenation".

=== Political activity (1999–2012) ===
Duke joined the Reform Party in 1999. He left the party after the 2000 election.

In 2004, Duke's bodyguard, roommate, and longtime associate Roy Armstrong ran for the U.S. House of Representatives as a Democrat, to serve Louisiana's First Congressional District. In the open primary, Armstrong finished second in the six-candidate field with 6.69% of the vote to Republican Bobby Jindal's 78.40%. Duke was the head advisor of Armstrong's campaign.

Duke claimed that thousands of Tea Party movement activists had urged him to run for president in 2012, and that he was seriously considering entering the Republican Party primaries. He did not contest the primaries, which Mitt Romney won.

=== Donald Trump advocacy ===
In 2015, it was reported by the media that Duke endorsed then presidential nominee Donald Trump. Duke later clarified in an interview with The Daily Beast in August 2015 that while he viewed Trump as "the best of the lot", due to his stance on immigration, Trump's support for Israel was a deal-breaker for him, saying, "Trump has made it very clear that he's 1,000 percent dedicated to Israel, so how much is left over for America?" In December 2015, Duke said Trump speaks more radically than he does, advising that Trump's radical speech is both a positive and a negative.

In February 2016, Duke urged his listeners to vote for Trump, saying that voting for anyone but Trump "is really treason to your heritage". Trump, Duke believed, was "by far the best candidate". When asked whether he renounced Duke's support, Trump responded: "I don't know anything about David Duke. Okay?...I know nothing about white supremacists. And so you're asking me a question that I'm supposed to be talking about people that I know nothing about." In March 2016, Trump disavowed Duke and the Klan, saying, "David Duke is a bad person" and "I disavowed him in the past. I disavow him now."

For the 2020 presidential election, Duke again expressed his preference for Donald Trump over Joe Biden, which was widely interpreted as an endorsement. Duke urged Trump to replace his vice president, Mike Pence, with talk show host Tucker Carlson, asserting that such a ticket was the only way to "stop the commie Bolsheviks".

=== 2016 campaign for U.S. Senate ===
On July 22, 2016, Duke announced that he was planning to run for the Republican nomination for the United States Senate seat in Louisiana being vacated by Republican David Vitter. He said he was running "to defend the rights of European Americans". He claimed that his platform had become the Republican mainstream, adding, "I'm overjoyed to see Donald Trump and most Americans embrace most of the issues that I've championed for years." But Trump's campaign reaffirmed that Trump disavows Duke's support, and Republican organizations said they will not support him "under any circumstances". On August 5, 2016, National Public Radio (NPR) aired an interview of Duke by Steve Inskeep in which Duke claimed that there is widespread racism against European Americans, that they have been subject to vicious attacks in the media, and that Trump's voters were also his voters.

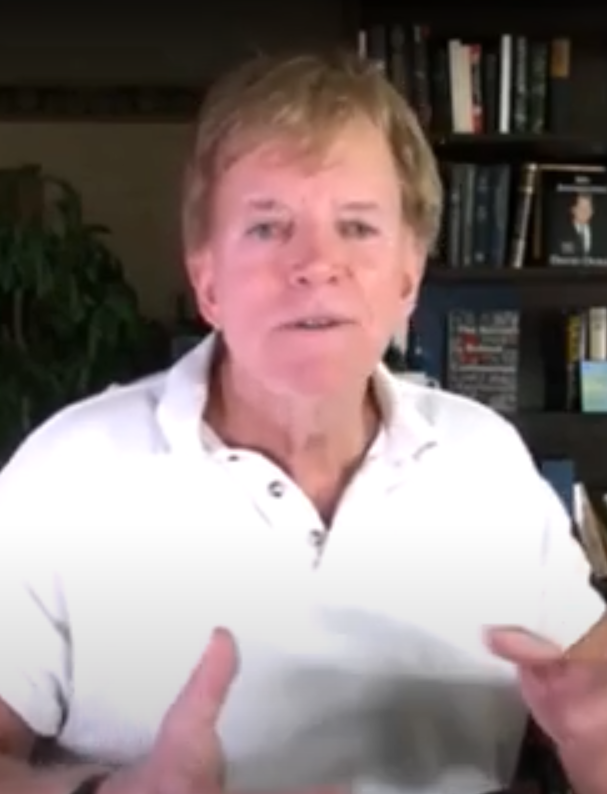
Duke in 2020

A Mason-Dixon poll released on October 20, 2016, showed Duke receiving support from 5.1% of voters in the state, barely clearing the 5% requirement for a candidate to be allowed to participate in a November 2 debate.

Duke received 3% of the vote on Election Day, with a total of 58,581 votes out of nearly 2 million cast. He came in 7th place in Louisiana's open primary.

Those who made donations to the campaign were publicly outed in several states in 2017, leading to boycotts, lost business, and one restaurant to close entirely.

=== 2019 Praise of Ilhan Omar ===
In 2019, first-term Minnesota congresswoman Ilhan Omar, referring to the state of Israel, stated that she: "wanted to talk “about the political influence in this country that says it is OK for people to push for allegiance to a foreign country.”" This statement by Omar drew wide condemnation from both Democrats and Republicans but was praised by David Duke. Duke further defended Omar stating: “So, let us get this straight,” he tweeted. “It is ‘Anti-Semitism’ to point out that the most powerful political moneybags in American politics are Zionists who put another nation’s interest (israel’s) over that of America ??????”

=== 2020 United States presidential election endorsement ===
In February 2019, the media reported Duke had endorsed Tulsi Gabbard for the Democratic nomination for president and changed his Twitter banner to a picture of Gabbard. He tweeted: "Tulsi Gabbard for President. Finally a candidate who will actually put America First rather than Israel First!" Gabbard refused Duke's support: "I have strongly denounced David Duke's hateful views and his so-called 'support' multiple times in the past, and reject his support." After Gabbard's defeat, Duke endorsed Trump for reelection.

=== 2024 United States presidential election endorsement ===
In October 2024, Duke endorsed Green Party nominee Jill Stein for president of the United States, criticizing what he viewed as "Trump's subservience to the Jewish lobby" and praising Stein's opposition to the Gaza war. Stein campaign manager Jason Call disavowed Duke's endorsement, and Stein's official Twitter account described Duke as a "racist troll".

== Antisemitism ==
=== Racial theories ===
In 1998, Duke self-published the autobiographical My Awakening: A Path to Racial Understanding. The book details Duke's social philosophies, including his advocacy of racial separation: "We [Whites] desire to live in our own neighborhoods, go to our own schools, work in our own cities and towns, and ultimately live as one extended family in our own nation. We shall end the racial genocide of integration. We shall work for the eventual establishment of a separate homeland for African Americans, so each race will be free to pursue its own destiny without racial conflicts and ill will."

A book review by Abraham Foxman, then the national director of the Anti-Defamation League (ADL), describes My Awakening as containing racist, antisemitic, sexist, and homophobic opinions.

Duke promotes the white genocide conspiracy theory and claims that Jews are "organizing white genocide". In 2017, he accused Anthony Bourdain of promoting white genocide; in response, Bourdain offered to "rearrange" Duke's kneecaps.

An ADL profile of Duke states: "Although Duke denies that he is a white supremacist and avoids the term in public speeches and writings, the policies and positions he advocates state clearly that white people are the only ones morally qualified to determine the rights that should apply to other ethnic groups."

=== Claims of "Jewish supremacy" ===
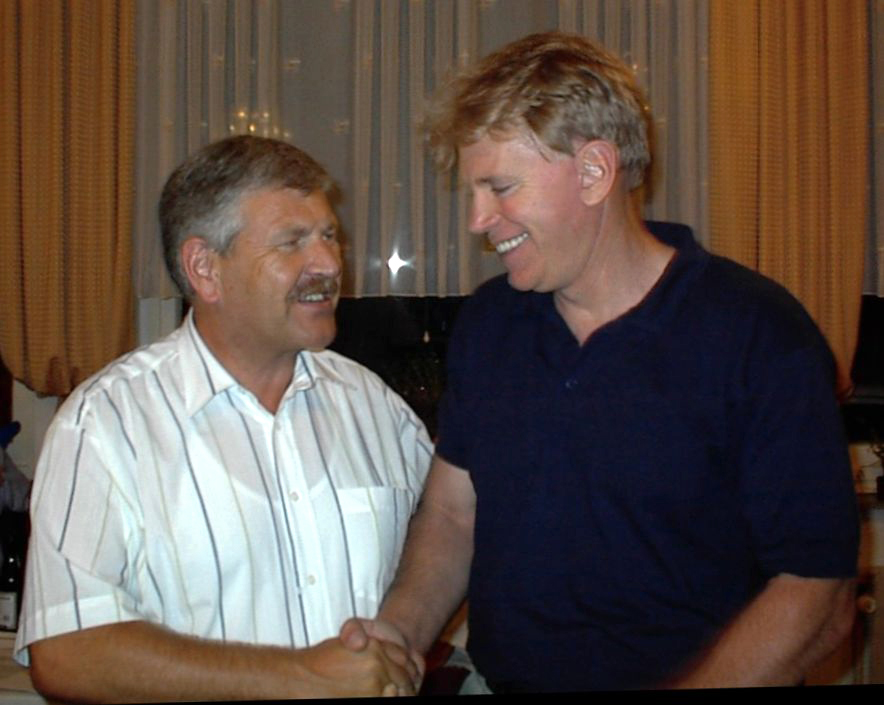
Duke (right) with Udo Voigt, the former leader of the National Democratic Party of Germany (NPD)

In 2001, Duke promoted his book Jewish Supremacism: My Awakening to the Jewish Question in Russia. In it, he purports to "examine and document elements of ethnic supremacism that have existed in the Jewish community from historical to modern times". The book is dedicated to Israel Shahak, a critical author of what Shahak saw as supremacist religious teachings in Jewish culture. Boris Mironov, Chairman of the Press Committee of Russia in the Yeltsin administration, wrote an introduction to the Russian edition, printed under the title The Jewish Question Through the Eyes of an American. The work draws on the writings of Kevin B. MacDonald, including multiple uses of the same sources and citations.

The Anti-Defamation League office in Moscow urged the Moscow prosecutor to open an investigation into Mironov. The ADL office initiated a letter from Alexander Fedulov, a prominent member of the Duma, to Prosecutor General Vladimir Ustinov, urging a criminal case be opened against the author and the Russian publisher of Duke's book. In his letter, Fedulov described the book as antisemitic and a violation of Russian anti-hate crime laws. Around December 2001, the prosecutor's office closed the investigation of Boris Mironov and Jewish Supremacism. In a public letter, Yury Biryukov, First Deputy of the Prosecutor General of the Russian Federation, stated that a psychological examination, which was conducted as a part of the investigation, concluded that the book and the actions of Boris Mironov did not break Russian hate-crime laws.

The ADL has described the book as antisemitic. At one time, the book was sold in the main lobby of the building of the Russian State Duma (lower house of parliament).

After the March 2006 publication of a paper on the Israel lobby by John Mearsheimer and Stephen Walt, Duke praised the paper in a number of articles on his website, in his broadcasts, and on MSNBC's March 21 Scarborough Country program. According to The New York Sun, Duke wrote in an email that he was "surprised how excellent [the paper] is. It is quite satisfying to see a body in the premier American university essentially come out and validate every major point I have been making since even before the war [in Iraq] even started. ...The task before us is to wrest control of America's foreign policy and critical junctures of media from the Jewish extremist Neocons that seek to lead us into what they expectantly call World War IV." Walt said: "I have always found Mr. Duke's views reprehensible, and I am sorry he sees this article as consistent with his view of the world".

In 2015, after 47 Senate Republicans warned Iran that agreements made with the U.S. that were not ratified by the Senate were liable to be repudiated by a future president, Duke told Fox News' Alan Colmes that the signatories "should become a Jew, put on a yarmulke, because they are not Americans. They have sold their soul to the Jewish power in this country and the Jewish power overseas". His website has hosted articles by authors claiming that Jewish loan sharks own the Federal Reserve Bank and that Jews own Hollywood and the U.S. media.

=== Supposed "Zionist control" ===
In the post-9/11 issue of his newsletter, Duke wrote that "reason should tell us that even if Israeli agents were not the actual provocateurs behind the operation [on 9/11], at the very least they had prior knowledge. ...Zionists caused the attack America endured just as surely as if they themselves had piloted those planes. It was caused by the Jewish control of the American media and Congress."

In an interview for the Iranian Press TV on September 11, 2012, Duke said: "There are Israeli fingerprints all over the whole 9/11 aspect. ...Israel has a long record of terrorism against America... there are a lot of reasons that Israel wanted 9/11 to happen. Of the Iraq War, Duke said, "The Zionists orchestrated and created this war in the media, the government, and international finance." In another appearance on Press TV the next year, Duke said Congress "is totally in the hands of the Zionists. The Zionists control the American government, lock, stock, and barrel." According to him, Jews' supposed control of the U.S. is "the world's greatest single problem".

=== Holocaust denier Ernst Zündel ===
Duke has made a number of statements supporting Holocaust denier Ernst Zündel, a German emigrant in Canada. Zündel was deported from Canada to Germany and imprisoned in Germany on charges of inciting the masses to ethnic hatred. After Zündel died in August 2017, Duke called him a "very heroic and courageous European preservationist".

=== Activities in Ukraine and Russia (2005–2006) ===
In the 1990s, Duke traveled to Russia several times, meeting antisemitic Russian politicians such as Vladimir Zhirinovsky and Albert Makashov.

In 2002, Duke attended a Holocaust Revisionist conference in Moscow where he took a picture alongside Ahmed Rami, the founder of Radio Islam. In September 2005, the Ukrainian private university Interregional Academy of Personnel Management (MAUP), described by the Anti-Defamation League (ADL) as a "University of Hate", gave Duke a PhD in history. His doctoral thesis was titled "Zionism as a Form of Ethnic Supremacism". The ADL has said that MAUP is the main source of antisemitic activity and publishing in Ukraine, and its "anti-Semitic actions" were condemned by Foreign Minister Borys Tarasyuk and various organizations. Duke has taught an international relations course and a history course at MAUP. On June 3, 2005, he co-chaired a conference named "Zionism As the Biggest Threat to Modern Civilization" sponsored by MAUP and attended by several Ukrainian public figures and politicians and Israel Shamir, described by the ADL as an antisemitic writer.

On the weekend of June 8–10, 2006, Duke attended and spoke at the international "White World's Future" conference in Moscow, which was coordinated and hosted by Pavel Tulayev.

=== Iranian Holocaust conference ===
On December 11–13, 2006, at the invitation of then Iranian president Mahmoud Ahmadinejad, Duke took part in the International Conference to Review the Global Vision of the Holocaust, an event held in Tehran questioning the Holocaust. "The Zionists have used the Holocaust as a weapon to deny the rights of the Palestinians and cover up the crimes of Israel", Duke told a gathering of nearly 70 participants. "This conference has an incredible impact on Holocaust studies all over the world", said Duke, adding, "The Holocaust is the device used as the pillar of Zionist imperialism, Zionist aggression, Zionist terror and Zionist murder." Besides David Duke, others in attendance included Nation of Islam leader Louis Farrakhan and Radio Islam founder Ahmed Rami.

=== Nick Fuentes ===
In 2024, Duke praised anti-Israel activists in a video uploaded on social media. In the same video, Duke praised Nick Fuentes, calling him a comrade in the fight for "our people" against "Jewish supremacism." Duke would collaborate with Fuentes and far-right activist and internet personality Sneako to host an event that ran in opposition to the 2024 Turning Point USA event that Fuentes was escorted out of due to his antisemitic and anti-Israel views. The rally which took place In June 2024, in Detroit also included mixed martial artist Jake Shields.

== Other affiliations and associations ==
=== Stormfront ===
In 1995, Don Black and Chloê Hardin, Duke's ex-wife, began a bulletin board system (BBS) called Stormfront. The website has become a prominent online forum for white nationalism, white separatism, Holocaust denial, neo-Nazism, hate speech, and racism. Duke is an active user of Stormfront, where he posts articles from his website and polls forum members for opinions and questions. He has worked with Black on numerous occasions, including on Operation Red Dog (the attempted overthrowing of Dominica's government) in 1980. Duke continued to be involved with the website's radio station in 2019.

=== British National Party ===
In 2000, Nick Griffin (then leader of the British National Party in the United Kingdom) met with Duke at a seminar with the American Friends of the British National Party. Griffin said: "instead of talking about racial purity, we talk about identity ... that means basically to use the saleable words, as I say, freedom, security, identity, democracy. Nobody can criticize them. Nobody can come at you and attack you on those ideas. They are saleable."

This was widely reported in the media of the United Kingdom, as was the meeting between Duke and Griffin, following the party's electoral successes in 2009.

=== Alt-right ===
Duke has written in praise of the alt-right, calling one broadcast "fun and interesting" and another a "great show". People for the American Way reported Duke championing the alt-right. Duke described them as "our people" when describing their role in Donald Trump's election as president.

There are also claims that while he is not an active member of the alt-right, Duke is an inspiration for the movement. The International Business Times wrote that he had "'sieg-heiling acolytes in the so-called 'alt-right'". The Forward has said that Duke "paved the way" for the alt-right movement.

== Legal difficulties and felony conviction ==
=== Tax fraud conviction and defrauding followers ===
On December 12, 2002, Duke pleaded guilty to the felony charge of filing a false tax return under 26 U.S.C. § 7206 and mail fraud under 18 U.S.C. § 1341 According to The New York Times: "Mr. Duke was accused of telling supporters that he was in financial straits, then misusing the money they sent him from 1993 to 1999. He was also accused of filing a false 1998 tax return... Mr. Duke used the money for personal investments and gambling trips... [T]he [supporter] contributions were as small as $5 and [according to the United States attorney, Jim Letten] there were so many that returning the money would be 'unwieldy.'"

Four months later, Duke was sentenced to 15 months in prison. He served the time in Big Spring, Texas. He was also fined $10,000 and ordered to cooperate with the Internal Revenue Service and pay money still owed for his 1998 taxes. After his release in May 2004, Duke said his decision to take the plea bargain was motivated by bias he perceived in the United States federal court system, not his guilt. He said he felt the charges were contrived to derail his political career and discredit him to his followers, and that he took the safe route by pleading guilty and receiving a mitigated sentence rather than pleading not guilty and potentially receiving the full sentence.

The mail fraud charges stemmed from what prosecutors described as a six-year scheme to dupe thousands of his followers by asking for donations. Using the postal service, Duke appealed to his supporters for funds by falsely saying he was about to lose his house and life savings. Prosecutors alleged that Duke raised hundreds of thousands of dollars this way. Prosecutors also stipulated that in contrast to what he wrote in the mailings, he sold his home at a hefty profit, had multiple investment accounts, and spent much of his money gambling at casinos.

=== 2009 arrest in the Czech Republic ===
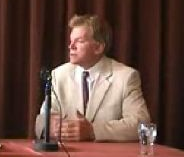
Duke in Belgium in 2008

In April 2009, Duke traveled to the Czech Republic on an invitation from a Czech neo-Nazi group, Národní Odpor ("National Resistance") to deliver three lectures in Prague and Brno promoting the Czech translation of his book My Awakening.

He was arrested on April 23 on suspicion of "denying or approving of the Nazi genocide and other Nazi crimes" and "promotion of movements seeking suppression of human rights", which are crimes in the Czech Republic punishable by up to three years' imprisonment. At the time of his arrest, Duke was reportedly guarded by members of the Národní Odpor. The police released him early on April 25 on condition that he leave the country by midnight that day.

Duke's first lecture had been scheduled at Charles University in Prague, but it was canceled after university officials learned that neo-Nazis were planning to attend. Some Czech politicians, including Interior Minister Ivan Langer and Human Rights and Minorities Minister Michael Kocáb, had previously expressed opposition to allowing Duke into the Czech Republic.

In September 2009, the office of the District Prosecutor for Prague dropped all charges, explaining that there was no evidence that Duke had committed any crime.

=== 2013 expulsion from Italy; Schengen Area ban ===
In 2013, an Italian court ruled in favor of expelling Duke from Italy. Then 63, Duke was living in the mountain village Valle di Cadore in northern Italy. Although he had been issued a visa to live there by the Italian embassy in Malta, Italian police later found that Switzerland had issued a residence ban against Duke that applied throughout Europe's Schengen Area.

== Other publications ==
To raise money in 1976, Duke (using the double pseudonym James Konrad and Dorothy Vanderbilt) wrote a self-help book for women, Finders-Keepers: Finding and Keeping the Man You Want. The book contains sexual, diet, fashion, cosmetic and relationship advice, and was published by Arlington Place Books, an offshoot of the National Socialist White People's Party. Tulane University history professor Lawrence N. Powell, who read a rare copy of the book given to him by journalist Patsy Sims, wrote that it includes advice on vaginal exercises and oral and anal sex and advocates adultery. The Klan was shocked by Duke's writing. According to journalist Tyler Bridges, The Times-Picayune obtained a copy and traced it to Duke, who compiled the content from women's self-help magazines. Duke has admitted using the pseudonym Konrad.

In the 1970s, under the pseudonym Mohammed X, Duke wrote African Atto, a martial arts guide for black militants; he claimed it was a means of developing a mailing list to keep watch over such activists.

== Personal life ==
While working in the White Youth Alliance, Duke met Chloê Eleanor Hardin, who was also active in the group. They remained companions throughout college and married in 1974. Hardin is the mother of Duke's two daughters. The Dukes divorced in 1984, and Chloê moved to West Palm Beach, Florida, in order to be near her parents. There, she became involved with Duke's Klan friend Don Black, whom she later married, and they began a small bulletin board system (BBS) called Stormfront, which has become a prominent online forum for white nationalism, Neo-Nazism, hate speech, racism, and antisemitism in the early 21st century.

Duke rented an apartment in Moscow beginning around 1999. He lived in Russia for five years. As of August 2016, he resides in Mandeville, Louisiana.

== In the media ==
Topher Grace portrays Duke in Spike Lee's 2018 film BlacKkKlansman. Duke was banned from Facebook in 2018, over a year after his participation in the Unite the Right rally. Duke was banned from YouTube in 2020 for repeatedly violating its policies against hate speech, along with Richard Spencer and Stefan Molyneux. Duke's Twitter account was permanently suspended in 2020 for violating the company's rules on hateful conduct.

== Self-published books ==
- Duke, David. Jewish Supremacism (Free Speech Press, 2003; 350 pages) ISBN 1-892796-05-8
- Duke, David. My Awakening (Free Speech Books, 1998; 736 pages) ISBN 1-892796-00-7

== See also ==
- Hate speech
- Racism in the United States

Party political offices
Preceded by Bob Richards	Populist nominee for President of the United States; 1988	Succeeded by Bo Gritz
Preceded by Robert M. Ross	Republican nominee for U.S. Senator from Louisiana (Class 2); 1990	Succeeded by Woody Jenkins
Preceded by Buddy Roemer	Republican nominee for Governor of Louisiana; 1991	Succeeded by Mike Foster
Louisiana House of Representatives
Preceded by Chuck Cusimano	Member of the Louisiana House of Representatives from the 81st district 1989–1992	Succeeded by David Vitter
