= The Wellspring =

American musical duo

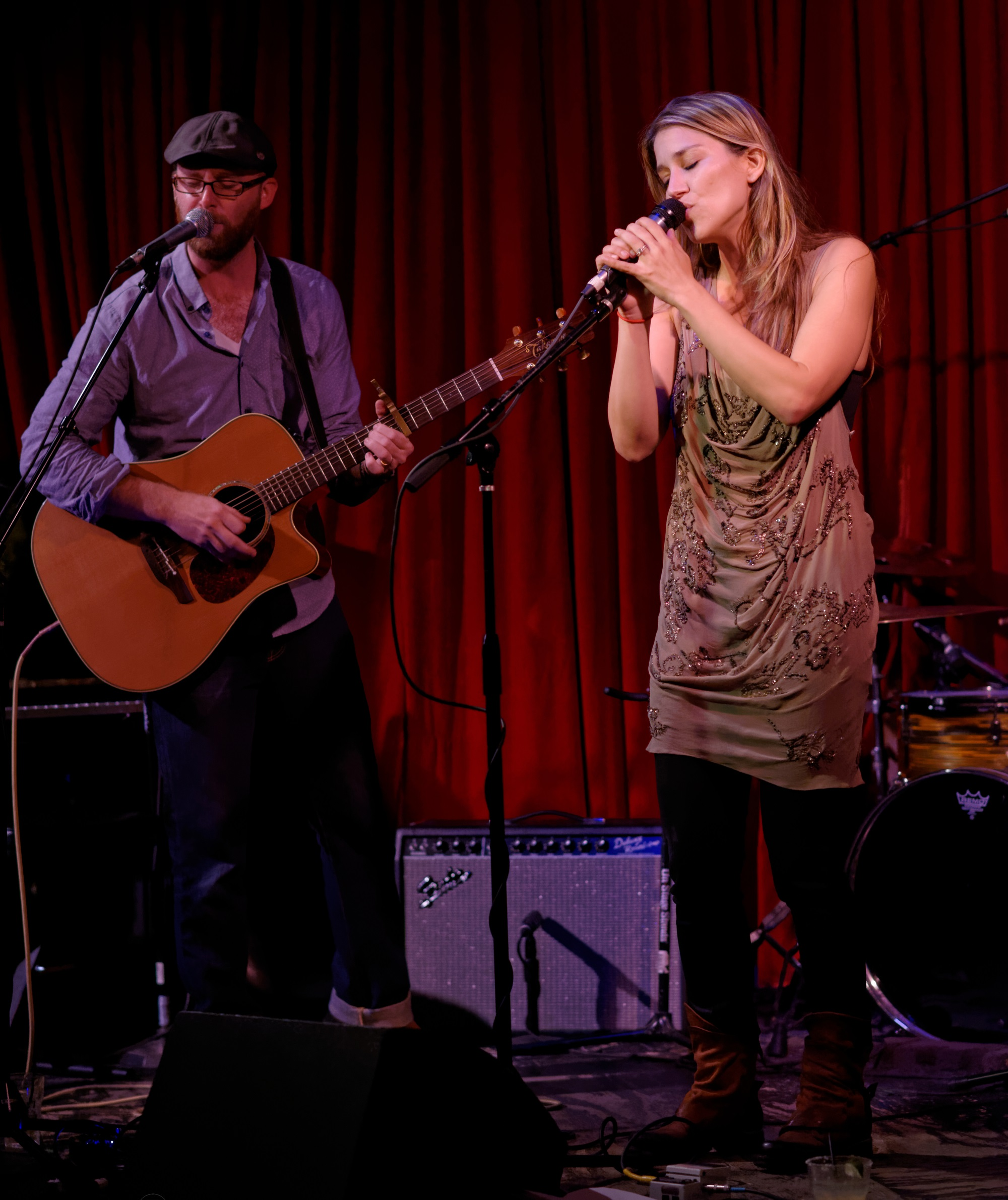

Background information
- Origin: New York City, New York, US
- Genres: Folk rock, indie pop
- Years active: 2009–present
- Spinoffs: Distant Cousins
- Spinoff of: Blue Fringe
- Members: Dov Rosenblatt; Talia Osteen
- Website: thewellspringmusic.com

The Wellspring is an American folk rock duo. Formed in 2009, the group is composed of singer-songwriters Dov Rosenblatt and Talia Osteen. Originally from New York City, the group is now based in Los Angeles.

== Career ==
In 2011, the band toured as an opening act for Pete Yorn and Ben Kweller, who delayed Saturday night shows to accommodate Rosenblatt's Jewish faith.

Their debut EP, The Wellspring EP (2011), was produced by Bill Lefler of Goudie, mixed by Greg Collins, and featured instrumentation from Steven Nistor and Dave Eggar. Later that year, they released a holiday EP entitled Keep A Light.

The band's debut album, The Girl Who Cried Sheep, was produced by Eric Rosse and released on January 13, 2014. That same month, the band appeared on the George Jones tribute album Deer Lodge George Jones with a cover of "She Thinks I Still Care". In October, the band released a third EP, Easy Tiger.

== Appearances in other media ==
- The band's cover of Big Star's "The Ballad of El Goodo" was featured in the "Charity Case" episode of House.
- "Here To Stay" appeared on Cougar Town and Orange Is the New Black.
- The band has scored several films, including Coffee Town (2013) and Slow Learners (2015).
- The duo served as composers on the 2017 Bravo comedy series The Imposters.

== Band members ==
- Dov Rosenblatt – vocals, guitar, piano
- Talia Osteen – vocals, bass, piano

== Discography ==
EPs

- The Wellspring EP (February 2, 2011; re-released February 14, 2011)
- Keep A Light EP (December 23, 2011)
- Easy Tiger EP (October 1, 2014)

Albums

- The Girl Who Cried Sheep (January 13, 2014)

Singles

- "The Ballad of El Goodo" (Big Star cover) (October 10, 2011; non-album single)
- "Willing To Lose" (January 15, 2014; The Girl Who Cried Sheep)
- "Here We Go (August 29, 2014; Easy Tiger EP)

Compilation appearances

- Deer Lodge George Jones (2014) ("She Thinks I Still Care")
