= Deer Lodge George Jones =

Compilation album by Various artists
- Released: January 21, 2014
- Genre: Country
- Length: 1:32:52
- Label: Deer Lodge Records

Deer Lodge George Jones is a tribute album to the country music singer George Jones. Released by Deer Lodge Records as DLR025 on January 21, 2014, the album features contributions from 30 artists/bands, mostly from the Northwestern United States. Twenty of the songs were recorded at Deer Lodge Studios in Portland, Oregon.

== Track listing ==
Disc 1
No.	Title	Artist	Length
1.	"White Lightning"	Sassparilla	2:52
2.	"She Thinks I Still Care"	The Wellspring	2:45
3.	"Still Doin' Time"	Lewi Longmire & Portland Country Underground	3:06
4.	"The Race Is On"	Water Tower	2:01
5.	"When the Grass Grows Over Me"	Tyler Stenson	2:58
6.	"Walk Through This World with Me"	Copper & Coal	3:27
7.	"The Grand Tour"	Keeter & Ali	2:55
8.	"Selfishness in Man"	Drunken Prayer	3:35
9.	"Seasons of My Heart"	The Tumblers	4:51
10.	"He Stopped Loving Her Today"	Stephanie Lynn	3:22
11.	"Tennessee Whiskey"	Brush Prairie	3:16
12.	"Finally Friday"	Honky Tonk Union	2:34
13.	"I Always Get Lucky with You"	Hank Sinatra	2:58
14.	"The Ghost of Another Man"	Shawn Smith	3:08
15.	"Where the Soul Never Dies"	Brandon Schott w/ Andy Reed	2:53

Disc 2
No.	Title	Artist	Length
1.	"Wings of a Dove"	Fernando	2:38
2.	"We're Gonna Hold On"	Hook & Anchor	2:28
3.	"The Battle"	Meredith Brothers	3:32
4.	"If You Couldn't Get the Picture"	Bert Sperling	4:09
5.	"Must've Been Drunk"	Hearts of Oak	3:27
6.	"Golden Ring"	Neon Renaissance	3:19
7.	"The Door"	Owen Grace	2:57
8.	"I Just Don't Give a Damn"	Gabe Rozzell	3:15
9.	"Choices"	NoPoMoJo	4:11
10.	"Bartender's Blues"	Countryside Ride	3:30
11.	"If I Don’t Love You (Grits Ain’t Groceries)"	Bad Assets	2:12
12.	"Milwaukee, Here I Come"	The Rocky Butte Wranglers	2:33
13.	"Her Name Is..."	Drugstore Cowboy	2:14
14.	"Too Much Water"	The Fall To Pieces	2:18
15.	"Who’s Gonna Fill Their Shoes"	W.C. Beck	3:29
