= Frederick Lloyd (director) =

British film director and composer (born 1991)

- Born: 23 February 1991 (age 35)
- Other name: Ursine Vulpine
- Education: University for the Creative Arts
- Occupations: Film director, screenwriter, composer (as Ursine Vulpine)
- Years active: 2010–present
- Website: www.ursinevulpine.com

Frederick Lloyd (born 23 February 1991) is a British film director and composer. He attended University for the Creative Arts in Farnham, graduated in 2012 with a first class degree in Film Production.

Lloyd's Pantheon was screened at the BKSTS 2012 student showcase. This was his third film to be shown at the BFI showcase, with The Constant being shown in 2011 and The Death of the Cinema Projectionist the same year. Pantheon went on to win Best Film, Best Score and Best Production Design at Screentest Film Festival 2013. It also screened internationally at Plus Camerimage 2012 in Poland and National Film Festival for Talented Youth 2013 in Seattle, USA. In July 2013, it was released online for public viewing a year after its completion.

The Constant was also selected for the 2011 BBC Music Video Festival and shown by the BBC on 20 screens around the UK.

== Selected filmography ==
- Pantheon (2012)
- The Death of the Cinema Projectionist (2011)

== Film & Trailer Scoring ==
Lloyd composes under the moniker of Ursine Vulpine, and scored the award-winning soundtrack for Pantheon (2012).

In October 2012, the track "Decompression/Reborn: Death" was used on the 2nd trailer for Kathryn Bigelow's film Zero Dark Thirty. It originally featured on the soundtrack to Pantheon.

In July 2013, Ark Ascending was used for the second theatrical trailer of The Hunger Games: Catching Fire.

In August 2013, the track "Reborn: Death (Alternate)", an unused track from the soundtrack to Pantheon, was featured in the second trailer for Paul Greengrass's film Captain Phillips.

In October 2015, Lloyd assisted in scoring a rearrangement of 'The Force' theme for the final trailer for Star Wars: The Force Awakens as well as its sequel Star Wars: The Last Jedi.

In June 2016, Lloyd's remake of Chris Isaak's original Wicked Game was used in the E3 reveal trailer for Microsoft's Forza Horizon 3.

In December 2016, Lloyd's remake of the Flaming Lips' original "Do You Realize??" was used for the first theatrical trailer of Transformers: The Last Knight.

In April 2019, the song titled "I'm Going to Drive Until It Burns My Bones" from the Album Respire was used for the trailer to the HBO Original show Chernobyl.

In July 2020, Lloyd's orchestral remake of "Triage at Dawn" from the Half-Life 2 soundtrack was used for the trailer to the interactive storybook The Final Hours of Half-Life: Alyx.

In March 2021, the track "Renzokuken" was used on the 2nd trailer for Zack Snyder's film Zack Snyder's Justice League

== Music videos ==
Lloyd has also directed music videos for a number of bands and artists, mainly based in the UK. These include:

- Big Sixes
- Deaf Havana
- In Colour
- Lovelife
- Dive In
- A Winged Victory for the Sullen
- Talons
- Sleepmakeswaves
- Exlovers
- LEXY
- Elvis
- A Death Cinematic
- Heinali and Matt Finney
- Nicholas Stevenson
