= The Whole World Lit Up =

Studio album by Blue Fringe
- Released: February 1, 2007
- Genre: Jewish rock
- Length: 40:51
- Label: Craig 'N' Co., Rendezvous Music
- Producer: C Lanzbom

Blue Fringe chronology
70 Faces (2005)	The Whole World Lit Up (2007)

The Whole World Lit Up is the third studio album by Jewish rock band Blue Fringe. It was produced by C Lanzbom of Soulfarm, and was released by Rendezvous Music and Craig Taubman's Craig 'N' Co. label on February 1, 2007. The album combines traditional Hebrew prayers with English lyrics, as well as covers of songs by The Flaming Lips, Moshav, and Soulfarm.

== Track listing ==
No.	Title	Writer(s)	Length
1.	"Etz Chayim"		3:18
2.	"Eshet Chayil"	Rosenblatt, Danny Zwillenberg	3:36
3.	"V'Shamru"		5:50
4.	"Bereishit" (Moshav cover)	Yehuda Solomon, Duvid Swirsky	3:41
5.	"Anayni"		4:04
6.	"Listen to You" (Soulfarm cover)	C Lanzbom, Noah Chase	4:27
7.	"Yehi Shalom"		3:51
8.	"Eicha"		3:50
9.	"Do You Realize??" (The Flaming Lips cover)	Wayne Coyne, Steven Drozd, Michael Ivins, David Fridmann	3:43
10.	"Birkat Kohanim"		4:31
Total length:			40:51

== Personnel ==
Blue Fringe

- Dov Rosenblatt - lead vocals, guitar, songwriting
- Avi Hoffman - lead guitar
- Hayyim Danzig - bass guitar
- Danny Zwillenberg - drums

Other

- C Lanzbom - producer, engineer, guitar, mixing, composer ("Listen to You")
- Sean Altman - vocals
- Alan Grubner - string arrangements, viola, violin
- Christopher Hoffman - cello
