= Chuck Cusimano =

American politician (born 1953)

Member of the Louisiana House of Representatives from the 81st district
- In office 1980–1988
- Succeeded by: David Duke

Personal details
- Born: Charles Vincent Cusimano II; November 25, 1953 (age 72)
- Party: Democratic; Republican
- Education: Louisiana State University

Charles Vincent Cusimano II (born November 25, 1953) is an American politician. A member of the Democratic Party and the Republican Party, he served in the Louisiana House of Representatives from 1980 to 1988.
