= Fight Test =

2003 EP by the Flaming Lips

EP by The Flaming Lips
- Released: April 22, 2003
- Recorded: 2002
- Genre: Indie rock
- Length: 32:47
- Label: Warner Bros.
- Producer: The Flaming Lips, Dave Fridmann, Scott Booker

The Flaming Lips EP chronology
The Southern Oklahoma Cosmic Trigger Contest (2001)	Fight Test (2003)	Ego Tripping at the Gates of Hell (2003)

Professional ratings
Review scores
Source	Rating
AllMusic	3/5 stars
Pitchfork	6.5/10 stars
Stylus Magazine	C+

Fight Test is an extended play (EP) released by the Flaming Lips released on Warner Bros. Records in 2003. The single version of "Fight Test" was released on June 23, 2003, peaking at number 28 on the UK Singles Chart. It is the third single to be picked from the album Yoshimi Battles the Pink Robots.

It is an enhanced CD, containing covers of Radiohead's "Knives Out", Kylie Minogue's "Can't Get You Out of My Head", and Beck's "The Golden Age". In addition, the EP includes two original songs. The UK version was a normal CD single, which also featured some previously unreleased songs. Fight Test was nominated for Best Alternative Album at the 46th Annual Grammy Awards.

The opening of "Fight Test" ("The test begins...now") was sampled from one of the sync tests from the Flaming Lips' own Boombox Experiments. The song was also the theme song for the short-lived MTV cartoon 3-South. It was furthermore used in a season 2 episode of the long-running TV series Smallville.

== Plagiarism settlement ==
"Fight Test" is musically similar to Cat Stevens's 1970 song "Father and Son". Following a settlement with the Flaming Lips, Stevens receives 75 percent of the royalties from Fight Test. In an interview with The Guardian, frontman Wayne Coyne stated:

I want to go on record for the first time and say that I really apologise for the whole thing. I really love Cat Stevens. I truly respect him as a great singer-songwriter. And now he wants his money. There was a time during the recording when we said, this has a similarity to 'Father and Son'. Then we purposefully changed those bits. But I do regret not contacting his record company and asking their opinion. Maybe we could have gone 50–50. As it is, Cat Stevens is now getting 75 percent of royalties from 'Fight Test'. We could easily have changed the melody but we didn't. I am really sorry that Cat Stevens thinks I'm purposefully plagiarising his work. I am ashamed. There is obviously a fine line between being inspired and stealing. But if anyone wanted to borrow part of a Flaming Lips song, I don't think I'd bother pursuing it. I've got better things to do. Anyway, Cat Stevens is never going to make much money out of us.

== Track listing ==
No.	Title	Writer(s)	Length
1.	"Fight Test"	Cat Stevens, Wayne Coyne, Steven Drozd, Michael Ivins, Dave Fridmann	4:08
2.	"Can't Get You Out of My Head" (Recorded live on 5 August 2002 at KEXP, Seattle)	Cathy Dennis, Rob Davis	4:06
3.	"The Golden Age" (Recorded live on 29 August 2002 at the CD101 "Big Room", Columbus, Ohio)	Beck Hansen	3:12
4.	"Knives Out" (Recorded on 18 July 2002; broadcast 8 August 2002 on Morning Becomes Eclectic, KCRW (Los Angeles))	Thom Yorke, Jonny Greenwood, Ed O'Brien, Phil Selway, Colin Greenwood	4:21
5.	"Do You Realize??" (Scott Hardkiss Floating in Space Mix)	Coyne, Drozd, Ivins, Fridmann	9:06
6.	"The Strange Design of Conscience"	Coyne, Drozd	4:31
7.	"Thank You Jack White (for the Fiber-Optic Jesus That You Gave Me)"	Coyne, Drozd	3:40

=== Enhanced CD content ===
- "Fight Test" video
- Christmas on Mars movie trailer

=== UK CD1 ===
1. "Fight Test"
2. "Thank You Jack White (for the Fiber-Optic Jesus That You Gave Me)"
3. "The Deterioration of the Fight or Flight Response"

=== UK CD2 ===
1. "Fight Test"
2. "The Strange Design of Conscience"
3. "Fight Test" (primitive demo with helium voice)

=== UK DVD ===
1. "Fight Test" (video)
2. "Fight Test" (audio)
3. "Knives Out" (from July 2002 XFM session)
4. "One More Robot" (from July 2002 XFM session)

== Chart positions ==
=== EP ===
Chart (2003)	Peak position
Australian Albums (ARIA)	86
US Billboard 200	93

=== Single ===
Chart (2003–2007)	Peak position
Denmark (Tracklisten)	12
UK Singles (OCC)	28
