= Do You Realize?? =

Single by the Flaming Lips

from the album Yoshimi Battles the Pink Robots
- Released: 19 August 2002
- Recorded: June 2000 – April 2002
- Genre: Alternative rock; psychedelic rock; space rock
- Length: 3:32
- Label: Warner Bros.
- Songwriters: Wayne Coyne, Steven Drozd, Michael Ivins and Dave Fridmann
- Producers: The Flaming Lips, Dave Fridmann, Scott Booker

The Flaming Lips singles chronology
"Waitin' for a Superman" (1999)	"Do You Realize??" (2002)	"Yoshimi Battles the Pink Robots, Pt. 1" (2003)

"Do You Realize??" is a song by the Flaming Lips, and was released as the first single from their 2002 album Yoshimi Battles the Pink Robots. It is one of the group's most accessible and popular songs, having reached No. 32 in the UK Singles Chart. It was adopted as the Official Rock Song of Oklahoma from 2009 to April 2013 and was ranked No. 31 on Rolling Stone's 100 Best Songs of the 2000s. It is also the band's most popular live song, and has rarely been excluded from setlists since its inception into their live shows in 2002.

== Structure and recording ==
In an interview with Mojo magazine, Wayne Coyne revealed that during the recording of Yoshimi..., band member Steven Drozd was trying to kick a heroin addiction. When they took breaks from playing, Drozd would have a really tough time with his withdrawal. Listening to him cry, and with the death of his father in mind, Coyne wrote: "Do You Realize??".

Coyne, commenting on "Do You Realize??" said: "Whenever I analyze the scientific realities of what it means to be living here on Earth – in this galaxy – spinning around the sun – flying through space – a terror shock seizes me!!! I'm reminded once again of how precarious our whole existence is..." Coyne stated in a 2023 interview: "Steven Drozd, our guitarist, liked the line: 'Everyone you know someday will die.' You don't really know where the song is going until that point. There's storytelling and it has wisdom, romance and heartache. It's gentle but not mellow and has elements of propulsion and triumph even though it's lazy and sad at the same time. It also benefits from not knowing it's going to be an important song. That's the best thing about it. The '1, 2, 3, 4' at the beginning is like the laughter at the end of Within You Without You on the Beatles' Sgt Pepper's Lonely Hearts Club Band. Anything we could do to lift the song and deliver a great but not heavy message."

== UK track listing ==
- 7"
1. "Do You Realize??"
2. "Up Above the Daily Hum"
- CD1
1. "Do You Realize??"
2. "If I Go Mad/Funeral in My Head"
3. "Syrtis Major"
- CD2
1. "Do You Realize??"
2. "Up Above the Daily Hum"
3. "Xanthe Terra"
- DVD single
1. "Do You Realize??" (video)
2. "Do You Realize??" (audio)
3. "The Southern Oklahoma Trigger Contest"
4. "Noodling Theme (Epic Sunset Mix #5)"

"Syrtis Major" and "Xanthe Terra" are instrumental pieces intended to be taken from the forthcoming Christmas on Mars soundtrack.

== Video ==
The music video was recorded on Fremont Street in Las Vegas and features Wayne Coyne, people dressed as bunnies and pigs, four female dancers in negligee and a live elephant. The video begins with Coyne resting at a bus stop at night along with a man dressed as a pig before being picked up by an unseen force that takes him to Fremont Street. Coyne walks down Fremont Street followed by four models while he sings the song. No other members of the band are seen. Close-up shots of people in various states of emotion ranging from sadness to joy are interspersed throughout the video. The elephant falls down when Coyne sings of death, but raises up later when he speaks of love, suggesting hope and renewal. The video ends with Coyne being returned by the same unseen force to the bus stop to sit with the man dressed as a pig to continue waiting for the bus.

== Oklahoma state song ==
In March 2009, "Do You Realize??" was announced as the official state rock song of Oklahoma, after winning an online vote among ten finalists as authorized by the Oklahoma state legislature: out of 21,000 votes cast, nearly 51% were for "Do You Realize??" The Oklahoma Senate approved this choice unanimously. However, on April 23, 2009, a vote in the Oklahoma House of Representatives fell three votes short of the 51 votes necessary to ratify the resolution: one Republican state legislator attacked the band for its use of offensive language, while another said he opposed the song because band member Michael Ivins had worn a red T-shirt with a yellow sickle and hammer during a previous appearance by the band. Democratic governor Brad Henry subsequently announced that he would issue an executive order in lieu of the resolution rejected by the Oklahoma House. However, it was revealed in 2013 that Republican governor Mary Fallin removed the song's designation as the Official Rock Song of Oklahoma by not renewing Brad Henry's executive order upon taking office in 2011.

== Reception ==
Coyne said of the reception to the song: "From the beginning, we would meet people who told us about playing Do You Realize?? when their mother was dying in the hospital or their brother had been in a car accident. We didn’t know what to say. In time, we were able to have some distance and let down our guard. We wrote the song, but what we made is not what it’s become."

== Commercial appearances ==
Hewlett-Packard featured the band alongside Penn and Teller in its 2002 commercial for its HP Media Center PC, which included a clip of the music video. In a review of the ad, music journalist Jim DeRogatis said, "It was a commercial for the Flaming Lips," as much as it was for HP's computer.

In 2003, VH1 featured the song in a spot that promoted its network. In 2004, Mitsubishi used the song in a television ad for one of its cars, as did Land Rover in 2007 with voice-over by Charles Shaughnessy.

A cover version was used in the teaser trailer of the film Transformers: The Last Knight in late 2016.

The song was used in the trailer for Guardians of the Galaxy Vol. 3 shown at San Diego Comic-Con in July 2022 and would later be included in the film as a part of Awesome Mix Vol. 3.

The song was later used in the trailer for the 2023 film Landscape with Invisible Hand.

In 2026, the song would be used in the teaser trailer for the DC Universe film, Clayface.

== Covers ==
The song was covered by The Reign of Kindo on their eponymous debut album. It was also covered in 2012 by Ball Park Music for Australian radio station Triple J's Like a Version.

Father John Misty, American folk singer-songwriter and former member of indie rock bands Saxon Shore and Fleet Foxes, performed a version of the song in July 2012 for The A.V. Club's A.V. Undercover series. Father John Misty's version is featured in the 2022 film Press Play.

American Jewish rock band Blue Fringe covered the song on their 2007 album The Whole World Lit Up.

In 2015, the song was covered by British singer/composer Ursine Vulpine (aka Frederick Lloyd). This version was used for the first theatrical trailer of science-fiction action film Transformers: The Last Knight, as well as the trailer for the third season of the television series Penny Dreadful. In 2016, Sharon Van Etten covered the song for Amazon's Gortimer Gibbon's Life on Normal Street soundtrack.

Willie Nelson released his cover of “Do You Realize??” as the second single from his 2024 album Last Leaf on the Tree, which was released on November 1, 2024.

== Charts ==
Chart performance for "Do You Realize??"
Chart (2002)	Peak position
Scotland Singles (OCC)	27
UK Singles (OCC)	32

== Certifications ==
Certifications for "Do You Realize??"
Region	Certification	Certified units/sales
United States (RIAA)	Gold	500,000^{‡}
^{‡} Sales+streaming figures based on certification alone.
