= My Awakening: A Path to Racial Understanding =

1998 autobiography by David Duke

- US first edition cover
- Author: David Duke
- Language: English
- Published: 1998
- Publisher: Free Speech Press
- Publication place: United States
- Media type: Print
- ISBN: 9781892796004

My Awakening: A Path to Racial Understanding is a 1998 autobiography written by David Duke. Duke's social philosophies are outlined, including the reasoning behind his advocacy of racial segregation.

Duke said in 1999 that Louisiana Republican governor Mike Foster's money had essentially financed My Awakening after Duke told a grand jury that during the 1995 Louisiana governor's race Foster had secretly bought Duke's list of contributors and supporters.

Glayde Whitney, a Florida State University psychology professor, wrote the foreword to the book, calling Duke a "seeker of truth."

According to court files, the book was ghostwritten by Kevin Alfred Strom.

== Reception ==
In a book review by Abraham Foxman, then National Director of the Anti-Defamation League (ADL), My Awakening was described as "a Minor League Mein Kampf", and Foxman commented that it espouses racist, antisemitic, sexist, and homophobic attitudes.
