= Coffee Town =

- Directed by: Brad Copeland
- Written by: Brad Copeland
- Produced by: Ricky Van Veen; Kathryn Deen
- Starring: Glenn Howerton; Steve Little; Ben Schwartz; Adrianne Palicki; Josh Groban
- Cinematography: Anthony B. Richmond
- Edited by: Ned Bastille
- Music by: The Wellspring
- Distributed by: Filmbuff
- Release dates: July 9, 2013 (On-demand platforms); July 27, 2013 (Just For Laughs)
- Running time: 88 minutes
- Country: United States
- Language: English

Coffee Town is a 2013 American comedy film written and directed by Brad Copeland. The first feature film from CollegeHumor, it was released on July 9, 2013 on digital platforms and in select theatrical engagements, leading up to a festival premiere on July 27, 2013 at Just For Laughs in Montreal.

== Plot ==
Will is a website manager for an electronics company who uses his local coffee house, Coffee Town, as his own personal office. When the corporate owners of the shop have plans to convert the coffee house into a modern Coffee Town and Bistro, Will enlists the help of his two best friends – lighting salesman Chad and local police officer Gino – to save his office. In order to thwart the plans of Coffee Town's corporate owners, the trio plan to stage a robbery, creating the illusion of a crime-riddled neighborhood that is not suitable for a bistro. However, standing in Will's way is Sam, a disgruntled barista with big dreams of being a rock star. Meanwhile, Will tries his best to court his coffee house crush Becca, an ER trauma nurse.

== Cast ==
- Glenn Howerton as Will
- Steve Little as Chad
- Ben Schwartz as Gino
- Adrianne Palicki as Becca
- Josh Groban as Sam
- Jake Johnson as Will's former roommate
- Derek Waters as Mike
- Josh Perry as Toby, a man with Down Syndrome
- Matt Riedy as Mr. Ryan, Chad's boss
- Taika Waititi as Cosmetology Instructor (Uncredited)
