= Babaganewz =

- Editor: Mark H. Levine
- Categories: Jewish education
- Frequency: Monthly
- Circulation: 40,000 subscribers in 1,300 schools
- Publisher: Michael Foilb
- Founder: Susan Laden
- Founded: 2001
- First issue: Fall 2001
- Final issue: 2008 (print)
- Company: JFL Media
- Country: USA
- Language: English
- Website: www.babaganewz.com

BabagaNewz was a full-color Jewish [values] classroom magazine that was published from Fall 2001. The print version ceased publication in 2008, and the online version was launched in early 2012.

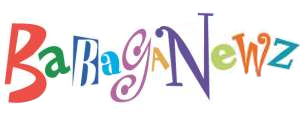

== History and profile ==
BabagaNewz was launched in 2001. The publication was for kids in 4th through 7th grade that presents current events, science, Torah, Israel, holidays and traditions through a Jewish lens. Every month during the year, Babaganewz, along with its Teachers' Guide and website at Babaganewz.com, focused on a timeless Jewish value that provides educational depth and personal reference for children in their formative years. The magazine had many sections, including "Check It Out" (trends), "Kid Power" (Jewish kids doing great things), "News 'N' Views", and "Babagonuts" (puzzles). On the cover of each magazine, the Jewish month (e.g. Tishrei, Kislev, Iyar) and the Jewish value were vibrantly stated. Online activities included interviews, educational games, and virtual tours of Israel. BabagaNewz was published by The AVI CHAI Foundation in partnership with Jewish Family & Life. The Foundation also financed the magazine. Despite the similar sounding name, "Babaganewz" was not a play on the common Middle Eastern eggplant dip, though the title's actual etymology is unknown.

The print version of BabagaNewz folded in November 2008. In 2011 Jewish book seller, Behrman House based in Springfield, New Jersey, took over the website and revised the spelling of the name to have a lower case 'N.' Babaganewz.com focused on providing resources for Jewish educators which expand the offerings of classroom materials. Under Behrman House the online version debuted as a commercial venture in early 2012. The site was segmented into the following categories; articles, games, activities, videos, e-cards, music and the teachers' section. The organization maintained a focus on Jewish values as well as Jewish holidays but they were unable to sustain profitability and abandoned the project a few years after takeover.
