= My Awakening (album) =

Studio album by Blue Fringe
- Released: September 7, 2003
- Genre: Jewish rock, pop rock
- Length: 57:18
- Label: Sameach
- Producer: Jon Perl

Blue Fringe chronology
My Awakening (2003)	70 Faces (2005)

My Awakening is the debut studio album by American Jewish rock band Blue Fringe, released on September 7, 2003. It was one of the first Orthodox Jewish rock releases in the United States, and the band was subsequently credited with advancing Jewish rock alongside Moshav and Soulfarm.

The album was independently published and distributed through Sameach Music; at the time, drummer Danny Zwillenberg recommended they only give five copies to each member's family, as they would need the rest to make a profit. The album ultimately sold over 14,000 copies, a rare feat in the limited Jewish market.

"Vayivarech" was covered by the a cappella group Shir Appeal on their album Zoozin' (2006). Another a cappella cover, performed by Kol Zimra and Avy Schreiber as "Blue Fringe's Vayivarech", appeared on the Sameach compilation A Cappella Treasury: Shabbos (2010).

== Track listing ==
1. "Shma Koleinu" – 2:32
2. "Ani Maamin" – 3:48
3. "Mibon Siach" – 4:53
4. "Hodu" – 3:30
5. "Vayivarech" – 3:44
6. "City of Gold" – 4:54
7. "Flippin' Out" – 4:59
8. "Kacha Lo" – 4:49
9. "Hafachta" (Diaspora Yeshiva Band cover) – 4:20
10. "My Awakening" – 5:30

Hidden tracks

1. "Shidduch Song" (live) – 7:32
2. "For A While" – 2:36

== Personnel ==
Blue Fringe

- Dov Rosenblatt – lead vocals, rhythm guitar, songwriting
- Avi Hoffman – lead guitar
- Danny Zwillenberg – drums
- Hayyim Danzig – bass guitar

Other

- Jon Perl – producer
