= Yoshimi Battles the Pink Robots =

Studio album by the Flaming Lips
- Released: July 16, 2002
- Recorded: June 2000 – April 2002
- Studios: Tarbox Road Studios, Cassadaga, New York
- Genres: Neo-psychedelia; space rock; dream pop; acid rock
- Length: 47:25
- Label: Warner Bros.
- Producers: The Flaming Lips; Dave Fridmann; Scott Booker

The Flaming Lips chronology
| The Soft Bulletin (1999) | Yoshimi Battles the Pink Robots (2002) | At War with the Mystics (2006) |

Singles from Yoshimi Battles the Pink Robots
- 1. "Do You Realize??" Released: August 19, 2002; 2. "Yoshimi Battles the Pink Robots, Pt. 1" Released: March 2003; 3. "Fight Test" Released: April 22, 2003; 4. "Ego Tripping at the Gates of Hell" Released: November 18, 2003

Yoshimi Battles the Pink Robots is the tenth studio album by American rock band the Flaming Lips, released on July 16, 2002, by Warner Bros. Records. The album saw the band pursue a more electronic direction than previous efforts, incorporating acoustic guitars and rhythms influenced by hip hop and Top 40 music. The album was well-received critically and commercially, helping the band break into popularity, and was adapted into a musical in 2012. To commemorate the album's 20th anniversary, the band embarked on a world tour where they played it live from start to finish each night starting in 2023 and ending in 2025, and a box set was also released in 2023.

== Music and lyrics ==
The lyrics of Yoshimi Battles the Pink Robots concern a diverse array of subject matter, mostly melancholy ponderings about love, mortality, artificial emotion, pacifism, and deception, while telling the story of Yoshimi's battle. The title character is inspired by musician Yoshimi P-We of Boredoms/OOIOO, following a comment in the Flaming Lips studio that her unusual singing style sounds like she is battling monsters. Flaming Lips frontman Wayne Coyne added 'pink'. P-We also performs on the album. Some listeners consider Yoshimi Battles the Pink Robots to be a concept album; however, the story is debated, as it is only directly apparent in the first four tracks. Despite the story-type title and science fiction themes, Coyne has made it clear that Yoshimi is not intended to be a concept album.

The vocal melody of track one, "Fight Test", echoes Cat Stevens's "Father and Son". Stevens, now Yusuf Islam, is receiving royalties following a relatively uncontentious settlement. Coyne has claimed that he was unaware of the songs' similarities until producer Dave Fridmann pointed them out. This claim, however, is contradicted by his statement to Rolling Stone magazine: "I know 'Father and Son' and I knew there would be a little bit of comparison. 'Fight Test' is not a reference necessarily to the ideas of 'Father and Son', but definitely a reference to the cadence, the melody, and chord progression. I think it's such a great arrangement of chords and melody".

The final track, "Approaching Pavonis Mons by Balloon (Utopia Planitia)", won a 2002 Grammy Award for Best Rock Instrumental Performance. The Flaming Lips also won the same award for "The Wizard Turns On...", taken from At War with the Mystics, in 2006. The title of the fifth track, "In the Morning of the Magicians", is a reference to the book The Morning of the Magicians.

== Release ==
=== Commercial performance ===
Yoshimi Battles the Pink Robots became their first gold-certified release in April 2006. As of 2009, Yoshimi Battles the Pink Robots has sold 570,000 copies in United States, according to Nielsen SoundScan.

== Critical reception ==
Professional ratings
Aggregate scores
| Source | Rating |
|---|---|
| Metacritic | 84/100 |
Review scores
| Source | Rating |
| AllMusic | 4.5/5 stars |
| Blender | 4/5 stars |
| Entertainment Weekly | B+ |
| The Guardian | 4/5 stars |
| NME | 9/10 |
| Pitchfork | 8.4/10 |
| Q | 4/5 stars |
| Rolling Stone | 4/5 stars |
| The Rolling Stone Album Guide | 4/5 stars |
| Uncut | 5/5 stars |

Yoshimi Battles the Pink Robots received widespread acclaim from critics. On Metacritic, the album has a weighted average score of 84 out of 100 based on 27 critics, indicating "universal acclaim". Calling the album "as strange as it is wonderful", Billboard nonetheless noted that "beneath the sunny, computer-generated atmospherics and the campy veneer of talk about gladiator-style clashes between man and machines with emotions, Yoshimi is actually a somber rumination on love and survival in an unfathomable world." Tom Moon of Rolling Stone praised the album's "ambitious" production, while Fortune magazine called it "a lush and haunting electronic symphony." Uncut declared that "even by their standards, Yoshimi is astonishing." Robert Christgau of The Village Voice gave the album a three-star honorable mention rating, indicating "an enjoyable effort consumers attuned to its overriding aesthetic or individual vision may well treasure". Yoshimi Battles the Pink Robots appeared in the best-albums-of-the-decade lists of several music publications, such as Rolling Stone (#27) and Uncut (#11), with Uncut also declaring it the greatest album released in the magazine's lifetime. The album was also included in the book 1001 Albums You Must Hear Before You Die.

== Track listing ==
All tracks are written by The Flaming Lips (Wayne Coyne, Steven Drozd, Michael Ivins) except where noted.

| No. | Title | Length |
|---|---|---|
| 1. | "Fight Test" (Cat Stevens, The Flaming Lips, Dave Fridmann) | 4:14 |
| 2. | "One More Robot/Sympathy 3000-21" | 4:59 |
| 3. | "Yoshimi Battles the Pink Robots Pt. 1" | 4:45 |
| 4. | "Yoshimi Battles the Pink Robots Pt. 2" | 2:57 |
| 5. | "In the Morning of the Magicians" | 6:18 |
| 6. | "Ego Tripping at the Gates of Hell" | 4:34 |
| 7. | "Are You a Hypnotist??" | 4:44 |
| 8. | "It's Summertime" | 4:20 |
| 9. | "Do You Realize??" (The Flaming Lips, Dave Fridmann) | 3:33 |
| 10. | "All We Have Is Now" | 3:53 |
| 11. | "Approaching Pavonis Mons by Balloon (Utopia Planitia)" | 3:09 |
| Total length: | | 47:25 |

Special edition surround sound DVD-Audio
| No. | Title | Length |
|---|---|---|
| 1. | "Fight Test" | 4:14 |
| 2. | "One More Robot/Sympathy 3000-21" | 4:59 |
| 3. | "Yoshimi Battles the Pink Robots Pt. 1" | 4:45 |
| 4. | "Yoshimi Battles the Pink Robots Pt. 2" | 2:57 |
| 5. | "In the Morning of the Magicians" | 6:19 |
| 6. | "Ego Tripping at the Gates of Hell" | 4:33 |
| 7. | "Are You a Hypnotist??" | 4:44 |
| 8. | "It's Summertime" | 5:45 |
| 9. | "Do You Realize??" | 3:32 |
| 10. | "All We Have Is Now" | 3:53 |
| 11. | "Approaching Pavonis Mons by Balloon (Utopia Planitia)" | 3:12 |

DVD-Audio exclusive tracks
| No. | Title | Length |
|---|---|---|
| 1. | "Up Above the Daily Hum" |
| 2. | "Yoshimi Battles the Pink Robots, Pt. 1" (Japanese version) |
| 3. | "If I Go Mad (Funeral in My Head)" |
| 4. | "Do You Realize?? Floating in Space Remix" (Edit) |
| 5. | "Yoshimi Battles the Pink Robots, Pt. 1" (AOL sessions) |
| 6. | "Do You Realize??" (CD101 version) |

DVD-Video bonus tracks
| No. | Title | Length |
|---|---|---|
| 1. | "Do You Realize??" (Mark Pellington version) |
| 2. | "Do You Realize??" (Wayne Coyne * Bradley Beesley * George Salisbury version) |
| 3. | "Making of the Do You Realize??" (Video) |
| 4. | "Yoshimi Battles the Pink Robots, Pt. 1" |
| 5. | "Making of the Yoshimi Video" |
| 6. | "Fight Test" |
| 7. | "Phoebe Battles the Pink Robots" |
| 8. | "Christmas on Mars" (Movie trailer) |
| 9. | "Making of the Yoshimi DVD-A" |
| 10. | "Are You a Hypnotist??" (George's Photogenic Stimulation Theory #1134) |

DVD-ROM extras
| No. | Title | Length |
|---|---|---|
| 1. | "Yoshimi Battles the Pink Robots, Pt. 1" (Animated episode) |
| 2. | "Fight Test" (Animated episode) |

Japanese CD bonus tracks
| No. | Title | Length |
|---|---|---|
| 1. | "Yoshimi Battles The Pink Robots, Pt. 1 (Japanese Version)" | 4:57 |

== Personnel ==
The Flaming Lips

- Wayne Coyne – songwriting, vocals, guitars, cover paintings, mixing, production
- Steven Drozd – songwriting, drums, guitars, keyboards, electronics, bass, vocals, mixing, production
- Michael Ivins – songwriting, bass, keyboards, backing vocals, mixing, production, additional engineering

Additional personnel

- Yoshimi P-We – vocalization
- Dave Fridmann – additional songwriting, production, mixing, programming, engineering, mastering
- Scott Booker – production
- Trent Bell – additional tracking
- Andy Taub – additional tracking
- George Salisbury – design and layout

== Charts ==
=== Weekly charts ===
Weekly chart performance for Yoshimi Battles the Pink Robots
| Chart (2002–2004) | Peak position |
|---|---|
| Australian Albums (ARIA) | 62 |
| French Albums (SNEP) | 86 |
| German Albums (Offizielle Top 100) | 93 |
| Irish Albums (IRMA) | 9 |
| New Zealand Albums (RMNZ) | 47 |
| Norwegian Albums (VG-lista) | 15 |
| Swedish Albums (Sverigetopplistan) | 51 |
| UK Albums (Official Charts) | 13 |
| US Billboard 200 | 50 |

| Chart (2024) | Peak position |
|---|---|
| Hungarian Physical Albums (MAHASZ) | 21 |

=== Year-end charts ===
Year-end chart performance for Yoshimi Battles the Pink Robots
| Chart (2003) | Position |
|---|---|
| UK Albums (OCC) | 151 |

== Certifications ==
| Region | Certification | Certified units/sales |
|---|---|---|
| Australia (ARIA) | Gold | 35,000^{^} |
| United Kingdom (BPI) | Platinum | 322,000 |
| United States (RIAA) | Gold | 500,000^{^} |
^{^} Shipments figures based on certification alone.

== Adaptations ==
=== Musical ===
In 2007, it was announced that the album would be made into a Broadway musical Aaron Sorkin and director Des McAnuff. Frontman Wayne Coyne said of the plot:

There's the real world and then there's this fantastical world. This girl, the Yoshimi character, is dying of cancer. And these two guys are battling to come visit her in the hospital. And as one of the boyfriends envisions trying to save the girl, he enters this other dimension where Yoshimi is this Japanese warrior and the pink robots are an incarnation of her disease. It's almost like the disease has to win in order for her soul to survive. Or something like that.

Des McAnuff stated that Aaron Sorkin exited the project after it became clear the musical would be sung-through. The musical includes existing songs from the album, as well as two other Flaming Lips albums, The Soft Bulletin and At War with the Mystics. The show received its world premiere at the La Jolla Playhouse in November 2012, starring Kimiko Glenn as Yoshimi Yasukawa, Paul Nolan as Ben Nickel, Nik Walker as Booker, Pearl Sun as Mrs. Yasukawa, John Haggerty as Mr. Yasukawa and Tom Hewitt as Dr. Petersen.

=== Graphic novel ===
A graphic novel adaptation of the album, Yoshimi Battles the Pink Robots: The Original Story by The Flaming Lips, was released on September 1, 2026. It is both written and illustrated by Wayne Coyne.
