= Ahmed Rami (writer) =

Moroccan-Swedish author, activist, military officer, and Holocaust denier

- أحمد رامي
- Born: 12 December 1946 (age 79); Tafraout, Morocco
- Education: École normale supérieure, Casablanca; Royal Military Academy, Meknes
- Occupations: Writer and political activist
- Known for: Holocaust denial
- Criminal charges: Hate speech
- Website: www.islam-radio.net

Ahmed Rami (Arabic: أحمد رامي; born 12 December 1946) is a Moroccan-Swedish writer, political activist, coup d'etat participant, military officer and Holocaust denier. He gained attention as the founder of the radio station Radio Islam, which now functions as a website.

== Biography ==
Rami was born in Tafraout, Morocco, the son of a Berber sheikh. While attending the école normale supérieure in Casablanca, Rami joined the National Union of Popular Forces. After graduating in June 1963, Rami taught history, geography, French and Arabic at secondary schools in Casablanca. In autumn 1965, Rami enrolled in the Royal Military Academy in Meknes with the intention — as an officer — of becoming more effective in his opposition to the regime. Following the arrest and disappearance of Mehdi Ben Barka, Rami became resolved "to enter the system in order to destroy it." Rami became a tank lieutenant in the Royal Moroccan Army and claims to have had close ties with general Mohamed Oufkir. Convinced that the King of Morocco Hassan II was a puppet of Jews and the Central Intelligence Agency (CIA), Rami participated in the 1972 Moroccan coup attempt. He sought and obtained political asylum in Sweden in 1973.

In 1987, Rami began using a public access Swedish radio station to broadcast Radio Islam, ostensibly a public relations program for Sweden's Muslims. The content of the shows, however, focused on Jews, propagated for Holocaust denial and nazism, and the station was accused of being a vehicle for antisemitism. In 1989, "Rami was charged by the Swedish Chancellor of Justice with hate speech (hets mot folkgrupp)." The charge was based in particular on programs aired on Radio Islam but also on passages of his book Vad är Israel? ("What is Israel?"). Rami was sentenced to six months imprisonment in 1990, and Radio Islam's transmission permit was revoked for a year.

The station resumed broadcasting in 1991 under the direction of neo-Nazi David Janzon; however, in 1993, Janzon was convicted of the same crime. In March 1992, Rami hosted the “world anti-Zionist conference” in Sweden, where he interviewed Robert Faurisson for Radio Islam. Other participants included Chicago Black Muslim leader Louis Farrakhan, Holocaust revisionist David Irving and Fred Leuchter, as well as representatives of Russia’s anti-Semitic Pamyat movement and representatives from Hezbollah and Hamas.

Rami was a featured speaker at the annual conference of the Institute for Historical Review, an organization which promotes Holocaust denial, in 1992. Radio Islam was off the air from 1993 to 1995, but the program returned in 1996 under Rami's direction, the same year that he established the Radio Islam website.

In October 2000, Rami was again convicted and fined by a Swedish court. Rami has been investigated for hate crimes in France and Sweden for his role in maintaining the Radio Islam website. The latest investigation ended in 2004 when the Swedish prosecutor was unable to prove that Rami was responsible for the content. According to Rami a "group of youngsters" was in charge of the website. He did not provide any names. On 25 November 2006, Rami was a guest lecturer at a convention of the Swedish National Socialist Front and the group distributed his books on their website. Rami also distributed NSF's own pamphlets and books.

In 2006 Rami attended a conference in Tehran hosted by the IRGC which promoted Holocaust Denialism. There were a total of sixty-seven participants from thirty different countries including former Ku Klux Klan leader David Duke, French Holocaust denier Robert Faurisson, and Yisrael Dovid Weiss, a spokesman for Neturei Karta.

== Bibliography ==
- Vad är Israel? ("What is Israel?") (1988) ISBN 91-971094-0-1
- Ett liv för frihet ("A life for freedom") (1989), autobiography ISBN 91-971094-1-X
- Israels makt i Sverige ("Israel's power in Sweden") (1989) ISBN 91-971094-2-8
- Judisk häxprocess i Sverige ("Jewish witch hunt in Sweden") (1990) ISBN 91-971094-4-4
- Tabubelagda tankar ("Tabooed thoughts") (2005) ISBN 91-975966-1-2
