= Radio Islam =

Former Islamic radio station in Sweden

- Stockholm; Sweden

Ownership
- Owner: Ahmed Rami

History
- First air date: 1987

Links
- Website: islam-radio.net

Radio Islam was a Swedish neo-Nazi and Islamic local radio channel, now a website. The EU's racism monitoring organization has called it "one of the most radical right-wing antisemitic homepages on the net".

== Mission ==
The Radio Islam website states that it "is working to promote better relations between the West and the Muslim World". It also states that it is "against racism of all forms, against all kinds of discrimination of people based on their colour of skin, faith or ethnical background. Consequently, Radio Islam is against Jewish racism towards non-Jews."

== History ==
In September 1973, Ahmed Rami, a former Moroccan army officer, came to Sweden from Paris. He gained political asylum by claiming that he took part in the failed coup attempt against King Hassan II in August 1972.

In 1987, Rami began using a public access Swedish radio station to broadcast "Radio Islam", ostensibly a public relations program for Sweden's Muslims. Rami claimed that the station was Anti-Zionist and pro-Palestinian. And that the station was meant to strengthen the relationship between Swedes and Muslims living in Sweden, in addition to deepen understanding and knowledge surrounding the Palestine question.

The radio program subsequently turned into a newspaper and later, a website. However, the content of the shows focused on Jews, and the station was accused of being a vehicle for anti-Semitism.

The radio program was broadcast from Stockholm and the website featured programs and commentary about how Jews and Zionists control the world, Holocaust denial, Nazi propaganda, and a list of influential Swedish Jews. Radio Islam regularly peddled antisemitic conspiracy theories, including promoting the Zionist Occupied Government conspiracy theory. The station also regularly promoted narratives taken from “Protocols of the Elders of Zion.” Select quotes from the website include: “What is the Jewish world cult? Yes, peddling and haggling. What is the Jewish world god? Yes, money.”

During its very first years, a number of well-known Swedish intellectuals and writers participated in the radio, including Jan Myrdal. In 1990 Rami was sentenced to 6 months in prison for hate speech, and Radio Islam's transmission permit was revoked for a year. The station resumed broadcasting in 1991 under the direction of the Swedish Nazi David Janzon; however, in 1993 Janzon was convicted of the same crime.

David Janzon was a member of the Swedish National Association, a neo-Nazi group based in Sweden. Before taking over Radio Islam, Janzon belonged to a circle of white supremacist sympathizers who supported Radio Islam’s transmissions financially and ideologically.

In May 1992 newspaper Expressen revealed that Rami had received financial support from PLO during the time he founded Radio Islam, and that he also had received some support from Iran. PLO had already broken all contact with, and dissociated from Rami because of his racist and pro-Nazi ideas, some long time before Expressen picked up the story.

Radio Islam was off the air from 1993 to 1995, but the program returned in 1996 under Rami's direction, the same year that he established the Radio Islam website. Rami was again convicted and fined by the Swedish court in October 2000. Rami has been investigated for hate crimes in France and Sweden for his role in maintaining the Radio Islam website. The latest investigation ended in 2004 when the Swedish prosecutor was unable to prove that Rami was responsible for the content.

In 2015, the Italian language version of Radio Islam reposted a neo-Nazi article naming ‘influential Italian Jews,’ though not all those listed in the piece were actually Jewish. The list prompted police in Rome to investigate the website. The website titled the list as members of the "Nazi-Jewish mafia".

Rami has been investigated, charged, convicted, and fined for hate speech and hate crimes, and in addition, Radio Islam was shut down by Swedish authorities multiple times. However, Rami and his website are still quite influential and he has published books, in addition to voicing support for militant groups like Hezbollah and neo-Nazi groups.

In a 2018 interview with Lebanese news station Al-Mayadeen, Rami refused to draw a distinction between Jews and Zionists and equated Jews to the mafia, stating: “the Zionists are occupying Europe and the West both politically and in terms of the media.” And in addition stating: “there is no difference between Jews and Zionists” and said that Judaism “is like a mafia in the West.”

== Contents ==
The focus of the Radio Islam website is the alleged influence of Jews and "Zionists" on society, and in particular on politics in Western countries and in the Middle East. It proposes that there are conspiracies of Jews/"Zionists" to control Western society and oppress and/or kill Muslims (among other groups), and that these actions are a historic feature of both Jews and Judaism (which it describes as the Jewish "Religion"). It considers the Holocaust to be a fraudulent "Zionist" attempt to turn attention away from "the ongoing Zionist war waged against the peoples of Palestine and the Middle East". Major topics of the website include "Zionist massacres", "Zionist terrorism", "Jewish Power", "Jewish racism", "Jewish racism against Blacks", Holocaust denial, "Jewish hypocrisy", "Jewish propaganda", "Jewish war against Iraq", and "Jewish war against Lebanon". Radio Islam's online library contains several complete works, including The Protocols of the Elders of Zion (which Encyclopædia Britannica describes as a "fraudulent document that served as a pretext and rationale for anti-Semitism in the early 20th century"), Adolf Hitler's Mein Kampf, Henry Ford's The International Jew, Arthur Koestler's The Thirteenth Tribe, Israel Shahak's Jewish History, Jewish Religion, and Roger Garaudy's The Founding Myths of Israeli Politics.

Radio Islam and Ahmed Rami had ties to publishings and meetings with the Swedish neo-Nazi party Nationalsocialistisk front (NSF), and Radio Islam as of 2018 still promoted Rami's books sold by the NSF online shop. Rami has been a guest-speaker at least once at NSF's events. Rami also wrote texts for some of the Nazi party's books.

== Holocaust denial ==
Radio Islam denies that the Holocaust took place. Their website describes the Holocaust as a "hoax" fabricated by Zionists, as a pretext for the establishment of an Israeli state.

== Criticism ==
A 2003 report commissioned by the European Monitoring Centre on Racism and Xenophobia described Radio Islam as "one of the most radical right wing anti-Semitic homepages on the net with close links to radical Islam groups", like Hamas, Islamic State, Al-Qaeda and Hezbollah, one of a number of "racist and xenophobic sites" which "utilis[e] the denial of the Holocaust as a component of anti-Semitic agitation" and "make use of the entire spectrum of anti-Semitic stereotypes". The Southern Poverty Law Center has described Radio Islam as "a Stockholm-based neo-Nazi propaganda outfit" which "contains a treasure trove of antisemitica" and Ahmed Rami as a "key IHR (Institute for Historical Review) ally" and "a key promoter of anti-Semitism worldwide". The Stephen Roth Institute lists it among a number of "Holocaust denial and/or neo-Nazi pages". The Anti-Defamation League notes that the site "promotes a myriad of anti-Semitic works", and states that it "demonstrates the implicit connection between Holocaust denial and other forms of anti-Semitism". Per Ahlmark, co-founder of the Swedish Committee Against Antisemitism, has described Radio Islam as "the most vicious anti-Jewish campaign in Europe since the Third Reich."

== Namesake confusion ==
It bears no relationship to RadioIslam.com, a website live streaming a daily Muslim talk radio program on public affairs. Radio Islam airs in Chicago on WCEV 1450 AM every day from 6-7 PM CST. It is produced by Sound Vision Foundation. Its executive producer is Abdul Malik Mujahid who also chairs the board of Parliament of the World's Religions. There are also two other websites bearing the "radioislam" address: radioislam.org.za and radioislam.org.mw, which are based in South Africa and Malawi respectively, and cover matters relating to Islam from their own perspectives. The former location of the website (and previously radio station) referred to on this page – radioislam.org – has been changed to islam-radio.net, presumably to avoid confusion.
