= 1992 United States presidential election in Idaho =

- November 3, 1992
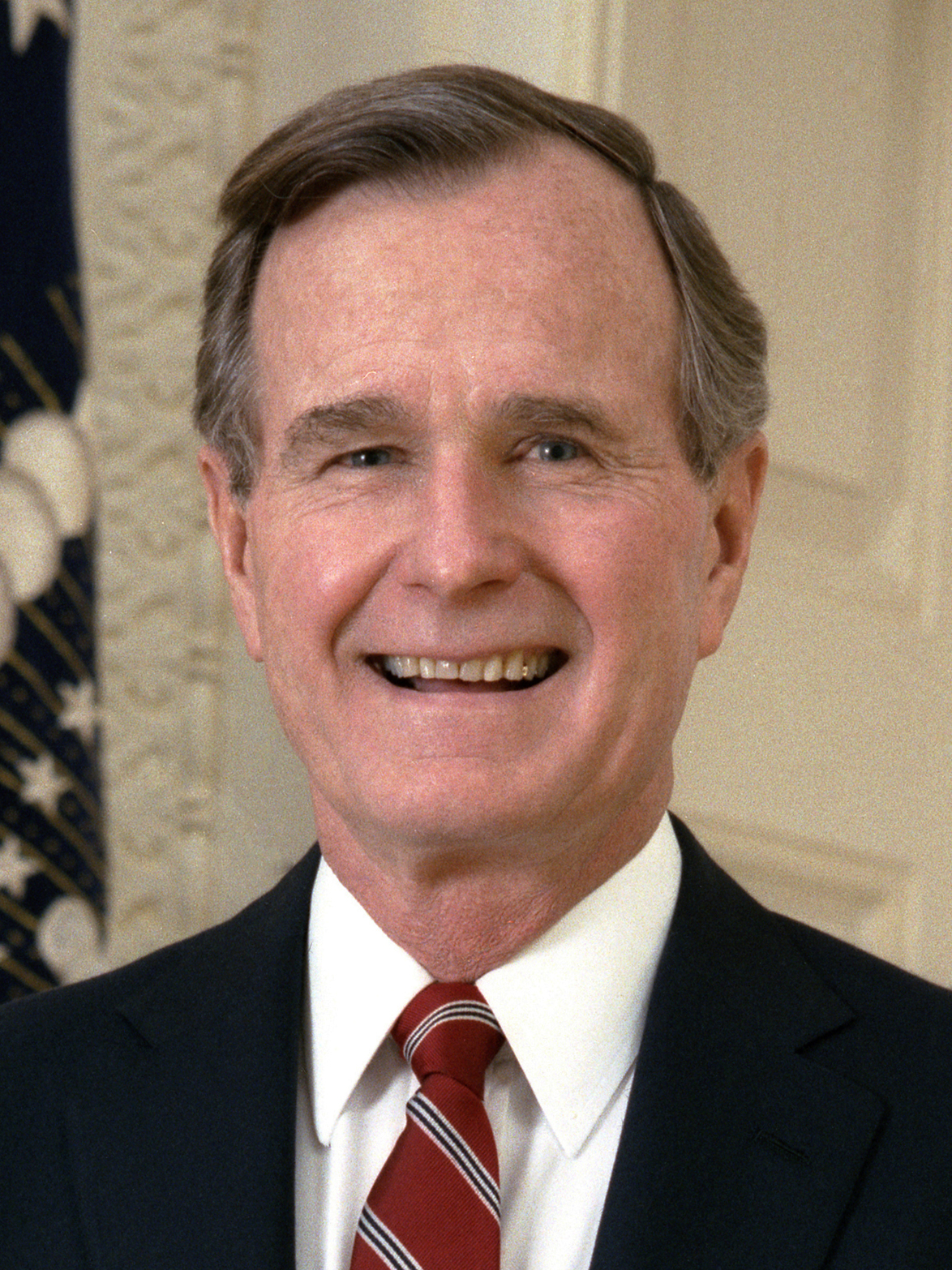

Nominee	George H. W. Bush	Bill Clinton	Ross Perot
Party	Republican	Democratic	Independent
Home state	Texas	Arkansas	Texas
Running mate	Dan Quayle	Al Gore	James Stockdale
Electoral vote	4	0	0
Popular vote	202,645	137,013	130,395
Percentage	42.03%	28.42%	27.05%
County results
Bush
30–40%
40–50%
50–60%
Clinton
30–40%
40–50%
President before election
George H. W. Bush
Republican
Elected President
Bill Clinton
Democratic

The 1992 United States presidential election in Idaho took place on November 3, 1992, as part of the 1992 United States presidential election. State voters chose four representatives, or electors, to the Electoral College, who voted for president and vice president.

Idaho was won by incumbent President George H. W. Bush (R-Texas) with 42.03% of the popular vote over Governor Bill Clinton (D-Arkansas) with 28.42%. This marked the weakest performance by a Republican candidate in Idaho since 1964, and the smallest popular vote victory in the state since 1912, when Woodrow Wilson carried it with 32.08% of the vote. Businessman Ross Perot (I-Texas) finished as a close third, with 27.05% of the popular vote. Clinton ultimately won the national vote, defeating both incumbent President Bush and Perot. As of the 2024 presidential election, this is the last election in which Bonner County, Clearwater County, Lewis County, and Benewah County voted for a Democratic presidential candidate.

With 27.05% of the popular vote, Idaho would prove to be Perot's fourth strongest state after Maine, Alaska and Utah. This election is the second of only two elections since Idaho's statehood in which it did not vote the same as neighboring Montana, the other being its first election 100 years prior.

In Franklin County, Clinton was a mere 22 votes away from placing 4th behind Independent candidate Bo Gritz, who himself scored 12.40%, his strongest county performance in the entire state.

== Results ==
1992 United States presidential election in Idaho
Party	Candidate	Running mate	Votes	Percentage	Electoral votes
Republican	George Bush (incumbent)	Dan Quayle (incumbent)	202,645	42.03%	4
Democratic	Bill Clinton	Al Gore	137,013	28.42%	0
Independent	Ross Perot	James Stockdale	130,395	27.05%	0
Populist	James "Bo" Gritz	Cyril Minett	10,281	2.13%	0
Libertarian	Andre Marrou	Nancy Lord	1,167	0.24%	0
New Alliance	Lenora Fulani	Maria Muñoz	613	0.13%	0
Write-in	Dr. John Hagelin	Dr. V. Tompkins	24 (Note: These votes were not separated by county.)	0.00%	0
Write-in	J. Quinn Brisben	William Edwards	3	0.00%	0
Write-in	Lyndon LaRouche Jr.	James Bevel	1	0.00%	0
Totals			482,114	100.00%	4

=== Results by county ===
County	George H.W. Bush Republican		Bill Clinton Democratic		Ross Perot Independent		Bo Gritz Independent		Various candidates Other parties		Margin		Total votes cast
County	#	%	#	%	#	%	#	%	#	%	#	%	Total votes cast
Ada	49,000	44.48%	31,941	28.99%	28,192	25.59%	681	0.62%	352	0.32%	17,059	15.49%	110,166
Adams	754	38.93%	457	23.59%	695	35.88%	27	1.39%	4	0.21%	59 (Note: In this county where Perot ran second ahead of Clinton, the margin given is that between Bush and Perot (Perot total subtracted from Bush total).)	3.05%	1,937
Bannock	12,016	37.30%	11,091	34.43%	8,116	25.20%	861	2.67%	127	0.39%	925	2.87%	32,211
Bear Lake	1,419	49.72%	562	19.69%	684	23.97%	179	6.27%	10	0.35%	735	25.75%	2,854
Benewah	1,223	33.03%	1,270	34.30%	1,165	31.46%	25	0.68%	20	0.54%	-47	-1.27%	3,703
Bingham	7,333	45.86%	3,565	22.29%	4,144	25.91%	886	5.54%	63	0.39%	3,189	19.95%	15,991
Blaine	2,243	27.96%	2,865	35.71%	2,831	35.29%	57	0.71%	26	0.32%	34 (Note: In this county where Perot ran second ahead of Bush, the margin given is that between Clinton and Perot (Perot total subtracted from Clinton total).)	0.42%	8,022
Boise	912	39.31%	623	26.85%	754	32.50%	22	0.95%	9	0.39%	158	6.81%	2,320
Bonner	3,937	28.49%	4,995	36.14%	4,645	33.61%	168	1.22%	76	0.55%	350	2.53%	13,821
Bonneville	16,557	46.80%	7,014	19.83%	10,241	28.95%	1,433	4.05%	131	0.37%	6,316	17.85%	35,376
Boundary	1,479	39.19%	1,095	29.01%	1,136	30.10%	46	1.22%	18	0.48%	343	9.09%	3,774
Butte	602	40.05%	433	28.81%	392	26.08%	73	4.86%	3	0.20%	169	11.24%	1,503
Camas	202	41.56%	134	27.57%	145	29.84%	2	0.41%	3	0.62%	57	11.72%	486
Canyon	19,220	50.78%	9,095	24.03%	8,974	23.71%	431	1.14%	129	0.34%	10,125	26.75%	37,849
Caribou	1,350	41.72%	562	17.37%	1,088	33.62%	230	7.11%	6	0.19%	262	8.10%	3,236
Cassia	4,052	53.16%	1,351	17.73%	1,785	23.42%	413	5.42%	21	0.28%	2,267	29.74%	7,622
Clark	195	46.10%	95	22.46%	119	28.13%	14	3.31%	0	0.00%	76	17.97%	423
Clearwater	1,152	30.87%	1,433	38.40%	1,098	29.42%	22	0.59%	27	0.72%	-281	-7.53%	3,732
Custer	829	38.31%	564	26.06%	729	33.69%	38	1.76%	4	0.18%	100	4.62%	2,164
Elmore	3,087	44.80%	1,858	26.97%	1,867	27.10%	63	0.91%	15	0.22%	1,220	17.70%	6,890
Franklin	2,115	52.22%	524	12.94%	890	21.98%	502	12.40%	19	0.47%	1,225	30.24%	4,050
Fremont	2,333	47.09%	903	18.23%	1,349	27.23%	361	7.29%	8	0.16%	984	19.86%	4,954
Gem	2,455	42.90%	1,609	28.11%	1,555	27.17%	89	1.56%	15	0.26%	846	14.79%	5,723
Gooding	2,178	39.14%	1,530	27.50%	1,591	28.59%	251	4.51%	14	0.25%	587	10.55%	5,564
Idaho	2,709	40.23%	1,974	29.31%	1,900	28.22%	121	1.80%	30	0.45%	735	10.92%	6,734
Jefferson	3,471	48.78%	978	13.74%	2,164	30.41%	472	6.63%	31	0.44%	1,307	18.37%	7,116
Jerome	2,972	44.23%	1,739	25.88%	1,768	26.31%	215	3.20%	26	0.39%	1,204	17.92%	6,720
Kootenai	13,065	35.96%	11,553	31.80%	11,261	31.00%	262	0.72%	187	0.51%	1,512	4.16%	36,328
Latah	5,353	32.78%	7,233	44.29%	3,602	22.06%	47	0.29%	95	0.58%	-1,880	-11.51%	16,330
Lemhi	1,540	40.30%	996	26.07%	1,175	30.75%	91	2.38%	19	0.50%	365	9.55%	3,821
Lewis	593	33.35%	674	37.91%	491	27.62%	8	0.45%	12	0.67%	-81	-4.56%	1,778
Lincoln	656	38.61%	514	30.25%	441	25.96%	83	4.89%	5	0.29%	142	8.36%	1,699
Madison	4,591	59.14%	741	9.55%	1,920	24.73%	489	6.30%	22	0.28%	2,671	34.41%	7,763
Minidoka	3,304	44.55%	1,815	24.47%	1,875	25.28%	389	5.24%	34	0.46%	1,429	19.27%	7,417
Nez Perce	5,431	32.00%	7,069	41.65%	4,363	25.70%	51	0.30%	60	0.35%	-1,638	-9.65%	16,974
Oneida	713	38.21%	351	18.81%	590	31.62%	210	11.25%	2	0.11%	123	6.59%	1,866
Owyhee	1,469	47.82%	686	22.33%	862	28.06%	53	1.73%	2	0.07%	607	19.76%	3,072
Payette	2,895	42.92%	1,656	24.55%	2,055	30.47%	99	1.47%	40	0.59%	840	12.45%	6,745
Power	1,352	45.41%	837	28.12%	697	23.41%	84	2.82%	7	0.24%	515	17.29%	2,977
Shoshone	1,441	22.01%	3,182	48.59%	1,878	28.68%	22	0.34%	25	0.38%	1,304	19.91%	6,548
Teton	762	39.73%	472	24.61%	608	31.70%	73	3.81%	3	0.16%	154	8.03%	1,918
Twin Falls	10,335	43.97%	6,593	28.05%	6,043	25.71%	479	2.04%	53	0.23%	3,742	15.92%	23,503
Valley	1,548	37.27%	1,259	30.32%	1,313	31.62%	14	0.34%	19	0.46%	235	5.65%	4,153
Washington	1,802	42.09%	1,122	26.21%	1,204	28.12%	145	3.39%	8	0.19%	598	13.97%	4,281
Totals	202,645	42.03%	137,013	28.42%	130,395	27.04%	10,281	2.13%	1,808	0.37%	65,632	13.61%	482,142

==== Counties that flipped from Republican to Democratic ====
- Benewah
- Blaine
- Bonner

== See also ==
- United States presidential elections in Idaho
- Presidency of Bill Clinton
