= Ralph Perry Forbes =

American neo-Nazi (1940–2018)

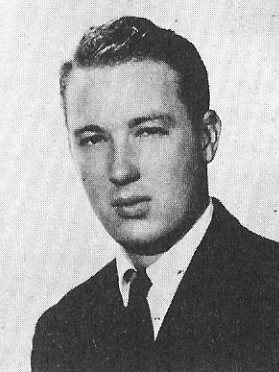
- Forbes, pictured 1963
- Born: March 12, 1940; Milwaukee, Wisconsin, U.S.
- Died: June 10, 2018 (aged 78); Russellville, Arkansas, U.S.
- Burial place: Arkansas State Veterans Cemetery
- Organization: American Nazi Party
- Spouse: Karen Paula Wright
- Children: 12

Ralph Perry Forbes (March 12, 1940 – June 10, 2018) was an American Christian Identity minister, neo-Nazi, and perennial candidate in Arkansas. A former US Marine, he was a member of the American Nazi Party throughout the 1960s. Starting in 1963, Forbes led the ANP's California branch, the Western Division, until his expulsion in 1967. In 1965, party leader George Lincoln Rockwell enlisted him to become the ANP's Christian Identity minister in an effort to appeal to a wider American audience; Forbes mixed neo-Nazism with Christian Identity ideology. His religious views created conflict between him and the otherwise largely secular organization.

As leader of the Western Division he was involved in a dispute with the city of Glendale, California, in 1964 and 1965. After Rockwell was murdered in 1967, Forbes, a Rockwell loyalist, left the ANP after a power struggle within the Western Division. He moved to London, Arkansas, where he continued his Christian Identity adherence and was active in local politics. In the 1970s, he founded the Sword of Christ Good News Ministries, a Christian Identity group. He was involved in an effort to mainstream the Ku Klux Klan in the 1980s. He ran for office several times, and was the campaign manager for David Duke's 1988 presidential campaign with the Populist Party.

Forbes was also known for filing several high-profile lawsuits. In 1986, he sued, among others, the Arkansas Department of Education and Satan in an effort to stop the Arkansas school system from celebrating Halloween. Federal judge George Howard Jr. agreed to hear the case, and eventually dismissed the suit. A 1992 lawsuit by Forbes after he was excluded from a television debate resulted in the Eighth Circuit Court of Appeals requiring public broadcasters to declare a "viewpoint-neutral" reason for excluding candidates; this was appealed to the Supreme Court of the United States, which decided against him in Arkansas Educational Television Commission v. Forbes.

== Early life ==
Ralph Perry Forbes was born in Milwaukee, Wisconsin, on March 12, 1940. He moved to Flint, Michigan, with his family in his youth. He enlisted in the United States Marine Corps in 1957; Forbes did not graduate from high school, but received his GED after his enlistment. While enlisted in Washington, D.C., he married Karen Paula Wright. Together they had twelve children.

== Political activity ==
=== American Nazi Party ===
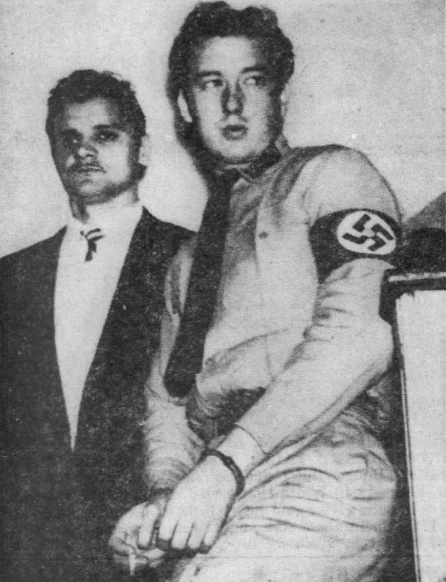
Forbes, pictured after his February 1961 arrest

After he left the Marines, Forbes became acquainted with neo-Nazi George Lincoln Rockwell, and joined Rockwell's American Nazi Party in 1960. Initially, he was Rockwell's driver, but by 1961 was one of the leaders of the group. In February 1961, he was dispatched alongside two other stormtroopers (the term for ANP members) to picket the premiere of the film Exodus at the Boyd Theatre in Philadelphia, Pennsylvania; they were greeted by counter protestors and police looking to prevent violence between Nazis and their opponents. It ultimately erupted into violence when, prior to the ANP members arriving, the anti-Nazi protestors mistook a group of unrelated youth for the Nazis and attacked them, leading to the teens being severely injured. When the three actually arrived they had objects thrown at them. In the aftermath of the event, 64 anti-Nazis and the three neo-Nazis, including Forbes, were arrested; the three were charged with inciting a riot, disorderly conduct, and breaching the peace. They were jailed for thirty days, but were acquitted.

In July, when the ANP left a courthouse meeting in their base of operations in Arlington, Virginia, Forbes, the driver, was arrested when he was found to be driving without a registration permit. Unable to pay his $100 bail, he was jailed. When Karl Allen decided to join the ANP, his presence created factional disputes within the group; due to his credentials, beyond what most members of the party achieved, many people feared he was actually a spy as his joining seemed too good to be true. Forbes was one of the members most opposed to him; they later became good friends. In 1962 Forbes marched outside the White House carrying anti-Jewish signs and was attacked.

In April 1963, John Patler, who had previously left the ANP, requested to be readmitted. Forbes despised Patler and was one of the strongest opponents to his re-admittance. When he was eventually readmitted, Forbes immediately resigned, despite Rockwell's pleas. However, at about this time, the leader of the California branch (the Western Division) of the ANP, Leonard Holstein, needed to be replaced after he was jailed; to replace him, Rockwell sought out Forbes. Rockwell asked Forbes to operate the Western Division, and Forbes quickly agreed and returned to the ANP after less than a month. He and his family moved to California, with Forbes announcing his transfer to the west division of the ANP on May 2, 1963. He was a captain within the ANP's ranks. After it helped him get a rally permit in 1963, Forbes had what was described by the Encyclopedia of Arkansas as a "long love-hate relationship with the [American Civil Liberties Union]". He cancelled the rally after he could not pay the required bond.

The Californian branch was noted as particularly contentious. As leader of the Western Division, Forbes led 25 ANP members who donated funds and attended group meetings, with Forbes allowing observer members to attend up to three meetings before they had to become official members. He organized several protests and counter protests against the civil rights movement in particular. One of these was a campaign of disruption against the civil rights group Congress of Racial Equality. Forbes disrupted a CORE rally led by Marlon Brando, jumping in his way waving a sign labeled "Marlon Brando Is a Nigger-Loving Creep"; Brando had no response. In 1964, after Rockwell was unable to attend, Forbes instead gave a speech to an audience of 6,500 at the University of California, Berkeley; the audience largely heckled him. He was a frequent speaker on California college campuses. His recruiting was largely poor.

At one point, Forbes contemplated assassinating Martin Luther King Jr. He may have discussed this plan with Rockwell, though there is no proof of this. He later declared that he "wouldn't hesitate to do it—or at least try" if it would "solve the [...] problem [...] but I don't think it would accomplish anything but make a martyr out of him. Violence isn't the solution today." Rather, he said, the solution to the "problem" was to send all Black people back to Africa.

In December 1965, Steven Dale Ahern, who claimed to be a former member of the ANP, testified that Forbes had developed a plan to seize control of several California Young Republicans branches, and that he had paid two ANP members, George King Jr. and Ray Drake, US$300 to take over the Long Beach branch of the group. Both Drake and King were actually elected, which Ahern claimed was based on ANP funds and on Forbes's order. This resulted in scandal for the California Young Republicans. Forbes denied this, denied that Ahern had ever been a member of the ANP, said Ahern was untrustworthy, and that: "I don't even own a car and didn't have $30 to waste on some back water club".

==== Dispute with the city of Glendale ====
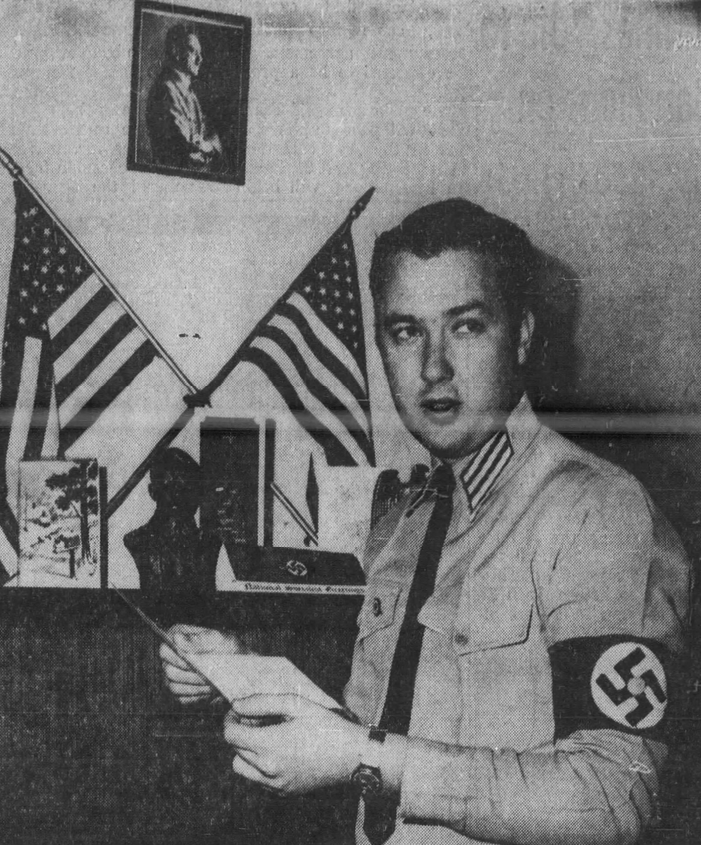
Forbes at his home in 1964

The Western Division relocated to Glendale, California in late 1964 and afterwards Forbes and other ANP members became involved in a dispute with the city. The Glendale authorities attempted to evict them and the city refused to turn on the electricity unless Forbes signed an affidavit promising to not use the house for Nazi activities, which Forbes refused. Forbes said that his lease allowed him to use the property for political purposes, which the homeowner had thought was the Republican or Democratic political parties, not the Nazi Party. The city then filed a complaint against Forbes for "operating a meeting hall in a single-family dwelling without a permit"; this dispute eventually escalated to also involve Los Angeles County.

In January of the next year, Forbes, his heavily pregnant wife, and their two children all protested the shut-off of electricity to their home solely due to their occupancy by sleeping in at the Glendale City Hall. His wife Karen protested carrying a sign labeled "I'll have my baby here—there is electricity". Karen was arrested for obstruction of city business but then released, and their third child was born three days later. Forbes eventually filed suit to force the city to turn the power on; they obliged in February. Also in January, he and two other ANP members were brought to trial for "converting a house into an assembly building without a permit". They defended themselves with help from the ACLU. Forbes was ultimately convicted of violating the city building code and ordered to pay $550 and spend five days in jail. He was booked, but released on bail pending an appeal. The conviction was overturned later that year. His eviction was stayed and he was allowed to live in his home until the expiration of the lease; his landlord was instead ordered to pay for his eviction proceedings.

=== Christian Identity and exit from the ANP ===
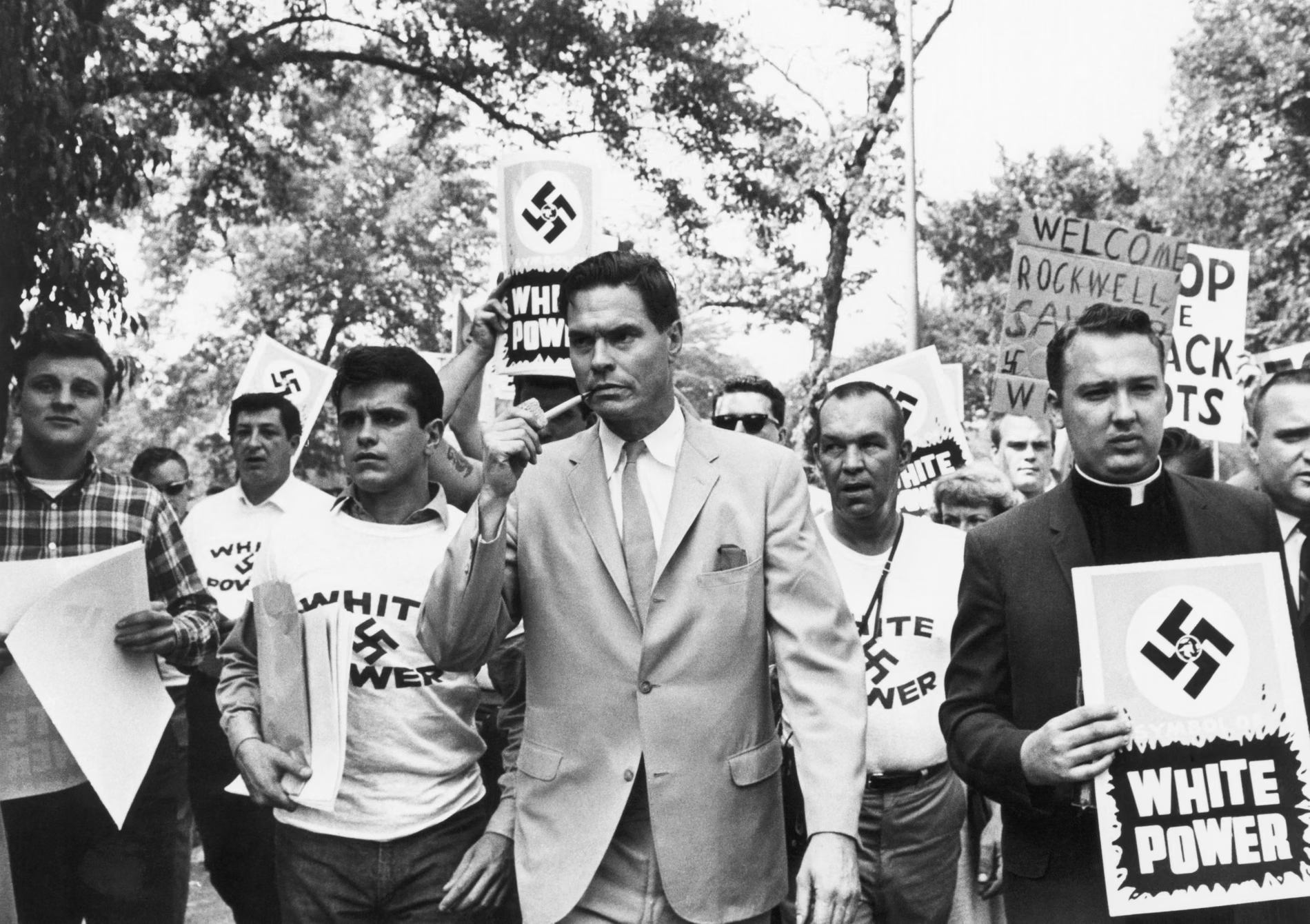
From left to right: John Patler, Rockwell, and Forbes in Christian Identity minister garb at a 1966 rally

According to writer William H. Schmaltz, Forbes was known within the neo-Nazi movement for his "strident racial views, his flair for the dramatic and his loyalty to Rockwell". He was very close to Rockwell and was one of the few ANP leaders to consistently stay loyal throughout his time in the party. He was the member most often assigned to delicate or sensitive assignments by Rockwell. He also had what scholar Jeffrey Kaplan described as an "affinity for the mystical", an obsession with the idea that he was witnessing prophecies and signs around him. He also had an "unbridled hatred" for Black people and Jews.

At the same time, the ANP had problems attracting more of the general population. Rockwell came to believe that they needed a religious angle to truly gain mass appeal in America. After meeting with Christian Identity minister Wesley A. Swift, Rockwell and Swift decided to bring their movements closer together. Christian Identity is a White supremacist interpretation of Christianity. Seeing an opportunity with Forbes, in August 1965 Rockwell wrote to Forbes, asking him to take on this assignment, and secretly convinced Forbes to become the ANP's official Christian Identity minister. Forbes was at the time the youngest division leader in the party. California was also home to several other Christian Identity ministries, making Forbes an ideal candidate for Rockwell's purposes. Forbes agreed.

Forbes blended neo-Nazism with Christian Identity, the first to do so; Rockwell hoped that this would broaden the audiences for both the ANP and Christian Identity and synergize them, justifying their racism through religion. Despite it being done on Rockwell's order, Forbes's increasing focus on religion alienated some group members, as many of them were inherently opposed to Christianity and viewed it as opposed to neo-Nazism. Rockwell aimed to quiet their complaints while Forbes integrated the Western Division with Christian Identity. Rockwell advised Forbes on suggested theological ideas, such as paralleling the lives of Adolf Hitler and Jesus, and insinuating that Hitler had actually been the Second Coming. He also manipulated Forbes's interest in hidden signs to get him to draw parallels between Nazism and Christianity.

In 1966, the Western Division moved to El Monte, California after the rent on Forbes's house increased four times over. In July of that year, Forbes, dressed in religious garb, led the picketing of the NAACP national convention. He was arrested in religious apparel in September 1966 at a Nazi march for attempting to stop Rockwell's arrest; upon his arrest, he said he was a reverend who led "the Second Covenant Church of Jesus Christ". He was jailed.

Rockwell was murdered by Patler in August 1967, and afterwards the conflict between the secular stance of the ANP and Forbes's beliefs came to the forefront, with his legitimacy as a leader now in question without Rockwell. Members Allen Vincent and James K. Warner led a schism within the Western Division, and Rockwell's successor Matt Koehl had to travel to California to mediate it. Koehl decided Forbes should be the legitimate leader; in response, members rebelled, resulting in schisms and a plethora of minor neo-Nazi groups. Later that year, Forbes was ousted by the Western Division. Koehl transferred him to Arlington, but Forbes left the group entirely soon after.

=== Arkansas politics ===
After he left the American Nazi Party, Forbes moved to London, Arkansas in 1972, where he settled with his family on a farm. Though his original switch to Christian Identity started due to Rockwell's manipulations, it became a deeply held belief of his. Forbes garnered a substantial amount of followers in his ministry, persisting even after Rockwell died and he left the ANP. He eventually integrated politics and religion in his belief system completely, and portrayed Rockwell as a deity within Christian Identity. He marked the anniversary of Rockwell's death as a religious holiday, and declared him "God's latter day apostle to America and all the lost sheep, the nations of true Israel." Writing numerous works on Christian Identity, which scholar Jeffrey Kaplan described as "turgid and derivative", he founded the Christian Identity group the Sword of Christ Good News Ministries (also just the Sword of Christ) in London in the 1970s. Their front group, the Shamrock Society, sold antisemitic literature and membership fees for another group also led by Forbes, God's White Army. Though it had only a small amount of original works the group had a large national mailing list. He was an active publisher of these through the 1990s; his newsletter, Straight Shoot'n: The Chaplain's Report to Christian Soldiers, was one of the most influential Christian Identity periodicals.

Calling himself the "Judgebuster", beginning in the early 1980s Forbes became known for filing numerous federal lawsuits. Several were about desegregation cases and were filed with other prominent segregationists. On October 30, 1986, Forbes sued the Russellville School District, Arkansas Department of Education, the Arkansas Education Association, an official of the education department, the Church of Satan, and Satan. The suit was on the behalf of all children and Jesus, as well as himself, in an effort to stop the education system from celebrating Halloween, which Forbes called "the Christmas of the anti-Christs". Federal judge George Howard Jr. heard the case. Local lawyer John Wesley Hall Jr. defended the devil "at no cost"; Hall argued that Forbes did not provide enough evidence that Satan "transacts business, owns property or committed any torts" in the state, and that the allegations against Satan could not be proven in court due to the First Amendment, so advocated for the suit's dismissal. The suit was ultimately dismissed by Judge Howard.

He became a prominent figure in Arkansas politics, running frequently, and unsuccessfully, for local office. In 1985, failing to meet residency requirements, Forbes was rejected as a candidate in a Little Rock school board election. Forbes ran under the New America First Party, which associated with some members of the original, 1940s America First Party. He was involved in an effort to mainstream the Ku Klux Klan in the 1980s. He entered the 1986 Republican primary for Lieutenant Governor of Arkansas, where Forbes attempted to downplay his history as a neo-Nazi, and polled up to 47% of the vote. Nobles withdrew, but Forbes was not chosen as his replacement nominee. He also tried to enter the senate election as a candidate for the American First Party, but a court ruled he had missed the ballot access deadline. He received 52 write in votes.

The next year, he assisted David Duke in his campaign for president on the Populist Party ticket, becoming campaign manager of his ticket. In 1990, he ran for Lieutenant Governor of Arkansas again in the Republican primary. In a three-way election, Forbes won the first round with 46% of the primary vote, but in the next rounds struggled. During the campaign he praised the Ku Klux Klan as "a godly institution", accused his Black opponent of being a drug dealer, and declared the most fundamental tenet of his religious belief system to be the preservation of the White race. It was the first Republican Party runoff election in the state. During the campaign, Forbes was assaulted by Robert "Say" McIntosh, a Black politician and activist, which resulted in statewide notoriety. McIntosh later claimed to actually support Forbes. These various incidents seriously harmed his reputation, and Forbes ultimately lost the primary to Kenneth "Muskie" Harris, a conservative Black man, in the runoff, getting only 14% of the vote.

After losing the primary, Forbes filed more lawsuits and attempted to win congressional office two more times. In 1992, Forbes ran as an independent in Arkansas's 3rd congressional district. When he was excluded from a television debate as part of the campaign, Forbes sued. Initially lower courts refused to take action, but the Eighth Circuit Court of Appeals ultimately agreed with Forbes, requiring public broadcasters to declare a "viewpoint-neutral" reason for excluding candidates. This was appealed to the Supreme Court of the United States, which ruled against him in Arkansas Educational Television Commission v. Forbes. As of 2002, he was still seeking public office and using it to advance White supremacist causes. He eventually left politics and went to live on his farm, though he maintained his Christian Identity practices.

== Later life and death ==
Karen Forbes died in 2004. Afterwards Ralph Forbes's health declined and he moved into a nursing home in Russellville, Arkansas. Forbes died June 10, 2018, and was buried in the Arkansas State Veterans Cemetery. Jeffrey Kaplan wrote of him in 2000 that he would not be remembered for his writings or Christian Identity thought, but rather his constant attempts to run for office.
