= David Duke 1988 presidential campaign =

American political campaign

David Duke For President Committee
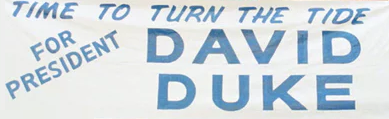
- Campaign: 1988 United States presidential election (Democratic primaries)
- Candidate: David Duke; Floyd Parker
- Affiliation: Populist Party (after March 1988); Democratic Party (before March 1988)
- Status: Announced: June 8, 1987; Won nomination: March 13, 1988; Lost election: November 8, 1988
- Key people: Ralph Forbes (campaign manager); Pauline Mackey (treasurer)
- Receipts: US$575,035.00 (1988-12-31)

In 1988, David Duke unsuccessfully ran for the presidency of the United States. Duke, a perennial Democratic candidate and Grand Wizard in the Ku Klux Klan announced his intention to seek the Democratic nomination for 1988 presidential election on June 8, 1987.

Duke faced opposition from the Democratic Party and appeared on the primary ballot only in a few states. Duke was excluded from the primary debates and lost multiple lawsuits regarding his debate inclusion. His best performance in the Democratic primaries was 3.74% of the popular vote in the Louisiana primary although he did win the New Hampshire vice-presidential primary, but he had mistakenly filed for the vice-presidential primary believing that it had binding delegates.

Duke switched parties and became the presidential candidate for the Populist Party after former Representative George V. Hansen had rejected the party's nomination. Bo Gritz was initially selected to serve as his vice-presidential running mate, but withdrew as he had been told that Representative James Traficant was given the presidential nomination, not Duke. Floyd Parker was selected to replace Gritz as Duke's running mate. Duke received 47,047 votes in the general election worth 0.05% of the popular vote.

After his presidential campaign Duke joined the Republican Party and was elected to the Louisiana House of Representatives. He ran for United States Senate as a Republican in 1990, 1996, and 2016. He also ran in the 1991 gubernatorial election and in the 1999 special election in Louisiana's 1st congressional district. Duke later stood as Republican presidential candidate in 1992.

== Campaign ==
=== Background ===
David Duke became the Grand Wizard of the white supremacist Knights of the Ku Klux Klan in 1974 and held the position until 1980. He ran for a seat in the Louisiana State Senate in 1975 and 1979, but lost both times. He left the Ku Klux Klan in 1980, after he was accused of trying to sell the organization's mailing list for $35,000. He founded the National Association for the Advancement of White People and served as its president after leaving the Klan.

He ran for the Democratic presidential nomination during the 1980 presidential election. Despite being six years younger than the required 35 years of age to run for president, Duke attempted to place his name onto the ballot in twelve states stating that he wanted to be a power broker who could "select issues and form a platform representing the majority of this country" at the Democratic National Convention.

=== Announcement ===
On June 8, 1987, Duke, standing beside around thirty supporters, announced on the steps of the Georgia State Capitol in Atlanta, Georgia, that he would run for the Democratic nomination for president. Duke had attempted to announce his campaign at two Atlanta hotels, but his reservation at both were cancelled as the hotel management stated that his appearance posed a threat to their safety. His candidacy was attacked with Paul G. Kirk, the Democratic National Committee chairman, stating that Duke's attempt at the party's nomination was "fraud on the process and the public", and that they would attempt to prevent him from gaining primary ballot access. Kirk compared Duke's candidacy to that of Lyndon LaRouche's many attempts at the Democratic nomination and how the Democratic Party had fought against LaRouche during his presidential campaigns as well.

=== Democratic primaries ===
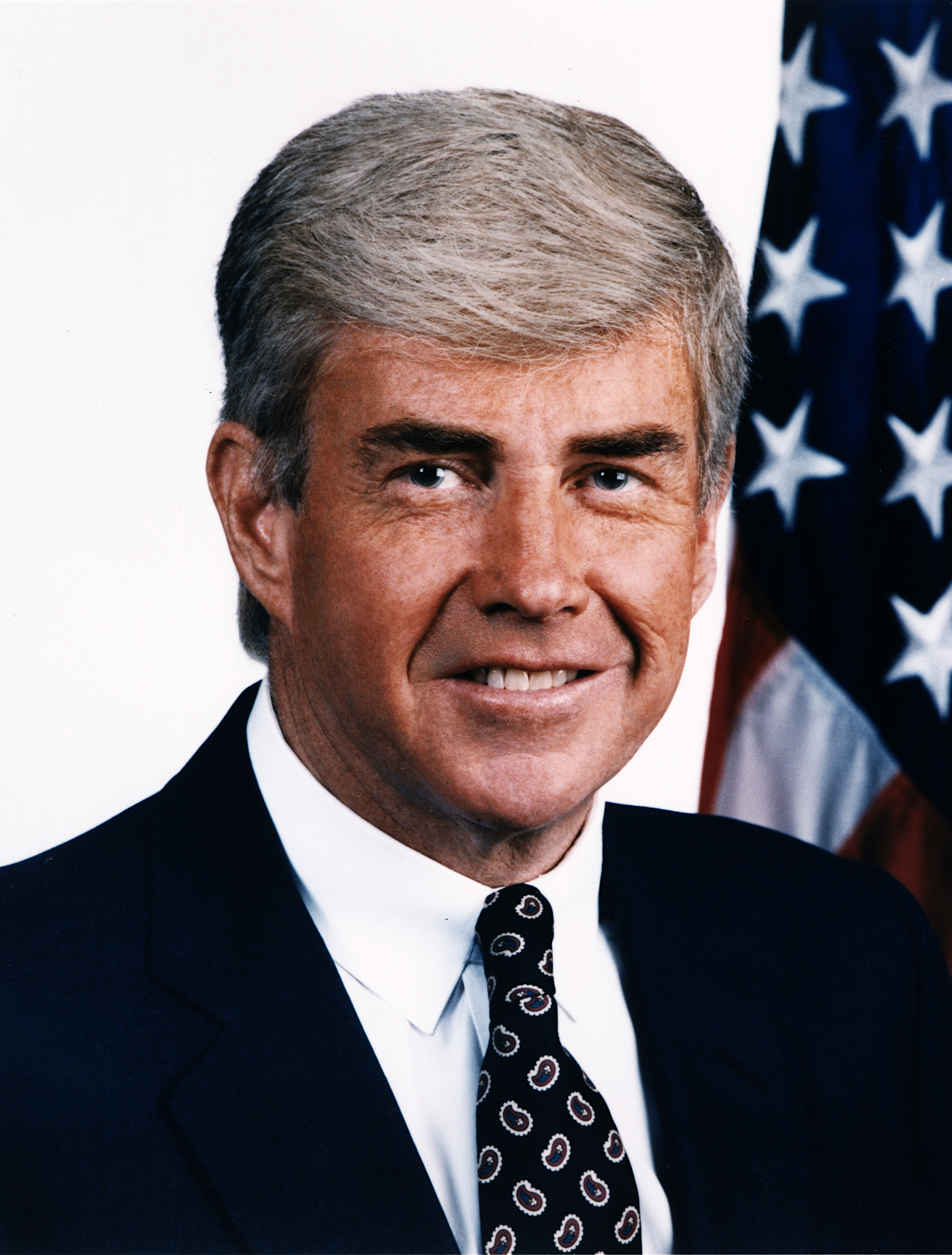
Duke yelled at Republican presidential candidate Jack Kemp after he filed to run in the New Hampshire presidential primary.

Shortly after his announcement Duke appeared on an Atlanta WSGT radio station which caused multiple protests around the station and call-ins meant to disrupt the radio station. A week later he pleaded no contest to a misdemeanor charge of obstruction of a roadway from when he was involved in an incident during a civil rights march in Forsyth County in January.

Duke and Representative Pat Schroeder were excluded from a primary debate hosted on Firing Line and sponsored by PBS. He filed a lawsuit in US district court claiming that he was unfairly excluded from the debate, but it was rejected by Judge Gabrielle Kirk McDonald who stated that Duke had failed to pursue his lawsuit after filing it. When he was excluded from a debate hosted at Tulane University, he filed a lawsuit, but lost in two federal court cases and the 5th US Circuit Court of Appeals refused to stop the debate until Duke pressed his lawsuit further. He filed another lawsuit against the Democratic Party for not allowing him to participate at the debate at Tulane University stating that his right to freedom of speech was violated which was worth $100 million due to his demands of $10,000 for every registered Democratic voter in Louisiana, $1 million for his presidential committee, and $10,000 for each day he was denied "his candidacy equal rights". However, it was dismissed by a New Orleans federal judge in March 1988.

When Duke registered to appear on the New Hampshire presidential primary ballot, he attempted to hold two press conferences at the New Hampshire State House, but both failed due to a lack of media coverage. Republican presidential candidate Jack Kemp registered to appear on the ballot, becoming the first major candidate to do so, and held a press conference. Duke yelled, "what are you going to do to end the massive racial discrimination against white people in America? When are you going to end affirmative action, which is a racial program discriminating against white people?" at Kemp while he was attempting to leave the room. Kemp told Duke that "I'm not a racist and I don't appreciate you asking!". Afterwards Duke held another press conference which received media coverage.

Duke attempted to speak before the Oklahoma Senate, but Senate President Pro Tempore Robert V. Cullison stated that Duke needed to be a bona fide candidate, which Cullison stated he was, have a senator sponsor him, and receive unanimous consent to speak. Senator Vicki Miles-LaGrange, one of two black members of the Oklahoma Senate, stated that Duke could probably find a sponsor in the Senate, but would not receive unanimous consent. Another presidential candidate, Stephen Koczak, attempted to speak before the Oklahoma Senate, but did not receive unanimous consent as multiple senators mistook Koczak for Duke. Koczak later spoke before the Oklahoma House of Representatives.

He appeared on the Democratic primary ballot in Arkansas, Louisiana, Missouri, New Hampshire, Oklahoma, Texas, and West Virginia. Duke appeared on the ballot in both the New Hampshire presidential and vice-presidential primaries which he paid $2,000 for. He placed twelfth in the presidential primary with 264 votes, behind Michael Dukakis' winning 44,112 votes, but won the vice-presidential primary with 10,531 votes for 99.69% of the popular vote. He had been the only candidate to file for the vice-presidential primary and did so by mistake as he believed the vice-presidential primary had binding delegates.

Duke did not appear on the ballot in Florida due to the Presidential selection Committee and Charles Whitehead, the chair of the Florida Democratic Party, stating that he was a frivolous candidate. His campaign manager Ralph Forbes attempted to pay the $2,000 filing fee for Duke to appear on the Alabama primary ballot, but arrived at the Alabama Democratic Party's headquarters at 5:15 p.m. which was fifteen minutes after the deadline.

Duke, a white supremacist, opposed civil rights activist Jesse Jackson and led a Sunshine Coalition in opposition to Jackson's Rainbow Coalition. Duke lost in his home state of Louisiana to Jackson where he only received 4% of the vote. Jackson stated that "it would be devastating for the United States if he became president."

=== Populist Party ===
On March 7, 1987, Duke gave a speech at the Populist Party National Committee in Sewickly, Pennsylvania, in which he said "This was the largest pro-white demonstration I've ever seen," in regards to the 3,000 people there and "There are going to be tremendous opportunities to take this country back for the founding majority". On September 6, 1987, twenty-five state delegations met at the Populist Party's national convention and selected former Representative George V. Hansen, who was serving a prison sentence until October 1987, to serve as their presidential nominee and Hubert Patty to serve as their vice-presidential nominee. However, Hansen stated on August 31, that he would not accept the nomination. He stated that he wouldn't seek the presidency outside of the major parties and that there was no honor in running "some kind of abortive effort". Hansen rejected the party's presidential nomination on November 11.

On March 13, Duke won the presidential nomination of the Populist Party and the party gave its vice-presidential nomination to Bo Gritz. However, Gritz would later withdraw on March 31, stating that he had been told that Representative James Traficant had been given the presidential nomination. Gritz was replaced as the vice-presidential nominee by Floyd Parker. Duke had managed to take the nomination due to the Populist Party's financial and organizational failures at the time which caused him to run unopposed after all of his opponents had already withdrawn from the race.

Arkansas initially refused to allow Duke onto the general election ballot due to sore loser laws as he had run in the Arkansas Democratic primary, but later allowed him onto the ballot. On September 27, 1988, he was removed from a Paramus restaurant by its owner after making an unannounced campaign event where he was to debate a Libertarian Party member at it after another restaurant cancelled his event after learning about him.

== Platform ==
=== Economics ===
The platform of the Populist Party called for the repealing of the income tax and the abolition of the Federal Reserve. Duke supported mandatory birth control for welfare recipients as it would give them incentive to have less children. He supported the creation of a flat tax of 10% and supported the abolition of the Internal Revenue Service.

=== Foreign policy ===
Duke supported apartheid in South Africa stating that "even the blacks there have infinitely more rights than the blacks on the rest of the African continent" and that he believed that apartheid was the only system in that could be used in South Africa for the country to "still operate, to function, to survive". He also wanted to end all sanctions against South Africa.

Duke believed that the United States should be neutral towards Israel, asserting that the United States' alliance with Israel had "damaged our country terribly" and that the alliance had "pushed the Arabs into the arms of the communists". Duke supported the blockade to Nicaragua and the aid to the Contras. He also supported the Strategic Defense Initiative.

=== Racism and equality ===
Duke opposed affirmative action stating that "white people face the most intensive racial discrimination literally in the last 100 years". He also opposed desegregation busing stating that "we have white children sent to these crime-filled, racist, drug-laden environments". Duke stated about racism that "if you define a racist as a person who simply loves his own people and wants to preserve his own heritage and his own values, then I would say that I was one". Duke also stated that desegregation busing and affirmative action caused a "terrible decline" in America's educational system.

The platform of the Populist Party called for the rejection of the Equal Rights Amendment and opposed rights for gay people. The platform also called for repealing the Immigration and Nationality Act of 1965. Duke stated that illegal immigrants brought 40-60% of illegal drugs to the United States. Duke stated that "the homosexual lobby is preventing a frank discussion of AIDS and appropriate steps to suppress the epidemic".

== Aftermath ==
On December 5, 1988, Duke changed his political affiliation to Republican and ran in a special election for a seat in the Louisiana House of Representatives, which he won on February 18, 1989. Duke later ran for United States Senate as a Republican in Louisiana in the 1990, 1996, and 2016 elections. He also ran in the 1991 Louisiana gubernatorial election and in the 1999 special election in Louisiana's 1st congressional district to fill the vacancy created by the resignation of Representative Bob Livingston.

On December 4, 1991, Duke announced that he would seek the Republican presidential nomination against incumbent President George H. W. Bush during the 1992 presidential election. He initially considered launching an independent third-party presidential campaign using the Republican primary as a springboard, but chose not to continue his campaign after he dropped out of the Republican primaries on April 19, 1992, stating that "Perot's candidacy would preclude other third-party candidacies". During the primary campaign he had won 119,115 votes worth 0.94% of the popular vote.

== Campaign finance ==
Candidate	Campaign committee										
Candidate	Raised	Total contrib.	Ind. contrib.	Pres. pub. funds	Com. trans.	Loans	Total off. to exp.	Spent	COH	Owed By	Owed To
David Duke	$575,035.00	$989,894.00	$518,942.00	$610,850.00	$31,884.00	$39,550	$270,792.00	$573,437.00	$1,598.00	$3,849,567.07	$39,160.00

== Results ==
Duke received 47,047 votes from twenty states with his best results coming from the southern states. He came third in place in states like Arkansas, Kentucky, Louisiana, and Mississippi.

1988 Democratic presidential primaries
State	Vote percentage	Votes	Result	Reference
Arkansas	0.97 / 100	4,805	Lost	
Louisiana	3.74 / 100	23,391	Lost	
Missouri	0.33 / 100	1,760	Lost	
New Hampshire	0.21 / 100	264	Lost	
New Jersey	0.38 / 100	2,491	Lost	
Oklahoma	0.61 / 100	2,388	Lost	
Texas	0.50 / 100	8,808	Lost	
West Virginia	0.41 / 100	1,383	Lost	
Total		45,290	Lost	

1988 United States presidential election
State	Vote percentage	Votes	Result	Reference
Arizona	0.01 / 100	113	Lost	
Arkansas	0.62 / 100	5,146	Lost	
California	0.00 / 100	483	Lost	
Colorado	0.01 / 100	139	Lost	
Florida	0.01 / 100	249	Lost	
Iowa	0.06 / 100	755	Lost	
Kentucky	0.34 / 100	4,494	Lost	
Louisiana	1.14 / 100	18,612	Lost	
Michigan	0.00 / 100	60	Lost	
Minnesota	0.07 / 100	1,529	Lost	
Mississippi	0.45 / 100	4,232	Lost	
Missouri	0.00 / 100	44	Lost	
New Jersey	0.08 / 100	2,446	Lost	
Oregon	0.01 / 100	90	Lost	
Pennsylvania	0.08 / 100	3,444	Lost	
Rhode Island	0.04 / 100	159	Lost	
Tennessee	0.11 / 100	1,807	Lost	
Vermont	0.08 / 100	189	Lost	
Wisconsin	0.14 / 100	3,056	Lost	
Total	0.05 / 100	47,047	Lost	

== See also ==
- David Duke 1992 presidential campaign
