= Bo Gritz =

U.S. Army officer (1939–2026)

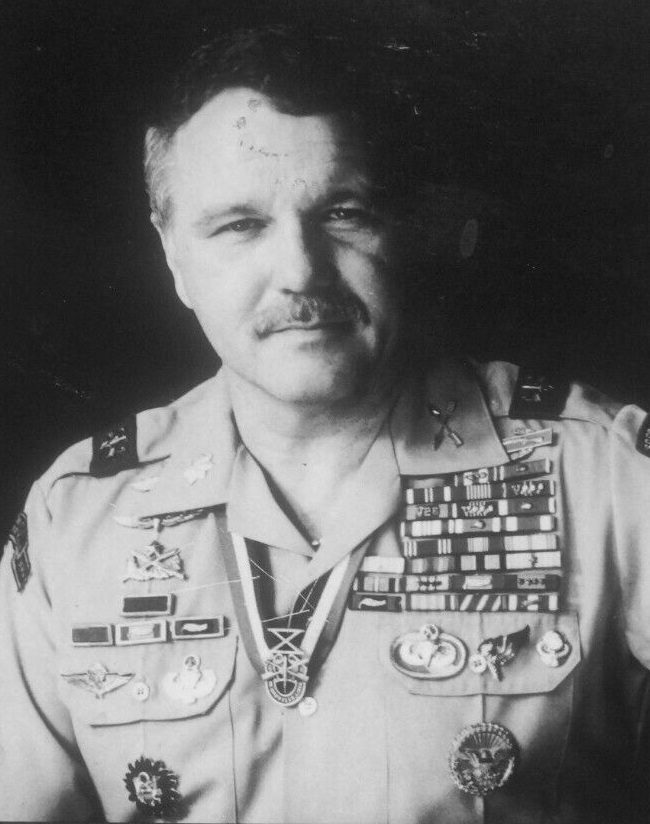

Personal details
- Born: James Gordon Gritz; January 18, 1939 Enid, Oklahoma, U.S.
- Died: February 27, 2026 (aged 87) Sandy Valley, Nevada, U.S.
- Party: Populist (1984–1996)
- Education: Fork Union Military Academy
- Website: bogritz.com (archived)

Military service
- Allegiance: United States
- Branch: United States Army
- Service years: 1957–1979
- Rank: Lieutenant colonel
- Unit: B-36, 5th Special Forces Group
- Conflict: Vietnam War
- Awards: Silver Star (3); Legion of Merit (2); Distinguished Flying Cross; Soldier's Medal; Bronze Star Medal (4); Purple Heart (2); Air Medal (26)

James Gordon "Bo" Gritz (/ˈɡraɪts/; January 18, 1939 – February 27, 2026) was an officer of the United States Army Special Forces who served during the Vietnam War. Following his military career, Gritz became involved in various failed attempts to rescue prisoners of war (POWs) associated with the Vietnam War POW/MIA issue.

In the realm of politics, Gritz ran for the United States presidency in 1992 as a candidate of the Populist Party, advocating an isolationist platform encapsulated in his manifesto, "The Bill of Gritz". His campaign was characterized by the slogan "God, Guns, and Gritz".

Gritz's life was marked by controversy, including questions regarding his military awards, his involvement in high-profile standoffs with federal authorities, and his involvement with the Christian Patriot movement and other right-wing militia groups.

Gritz was born in Enid, Oklahoma, and spent his last years in Sandy Valley, Nevada. He was the father of four children.

== Early life and education ==
Gritz was born on January 18, 1939, in Enid, Oklahoma. His father was a serviceman in the United States Army Air Forces during World War II and was killed in action. In the wake of his father's death, Gritz was raised by his maternal grandparents.

His early education was marked by a significant event when he was expelled from his local high school for reasons not specified. This setback, however, did not deter him from pursuing his education. He subsequently attended the Fork Union Military Academy in Virginia, a prestigious military school known for its rigorous academic and physical programs. Gritz graduated from the academy, setting the stage for his future military career.

== Military career ==
Gritz began his military career when he commissioned in the Army on August 20, 1957, and attended Officer Candidate School (OCS). During the Vietnam War, Gritz commanded detachment "B-36" of the 5th Special Forces Group (Airborne). This detachment was a mixed American and Cambodian-Vietnamese MIKE Force composed predominantly of local mercenaries. They operated in the III Corps area of southern South Vietnam near the Cambodian border. Among his successful missions was the retrieval of the black box from a downed Lockheed U-2 spy plane in enemy territory in Cambodia in December 1966.

After six years in Vietnam, Gritz served in a variety of assignments, including commanding Special Forces in Latin America from 1975 to 1977, serving as a Desk Officer for the Middle East, and acting as Chief of Congressional Relations for the Defense Security Agency (International Security Affairs) in the Office of the United States Secretary of Defense from 1977 to 1979. He retired in 1979 at the rank of lieutenant colonel. Following his formal retirement, Gritz claimed, with video evidence, to have trained the Afghan mujahideen in the United States on behalf of the government.

General William Westmoreland, in his memoir A Soldier Reports, cites Gritz as "The" American Soldier. Gritz received numerous military awards during his service, although some of these have been called into question. A memo regarding his awards and award recommendations during his time in Vietnam seems to indicate that Gritz was personally involved with the recommendation of some of his medals, including the Legion of Merit, and that some of his award recommendations cited the same missions and incidents, effectively awarding Gritz multiple medals for the same missions, including the Silver Star, Bronze Star Medal, Air Medal, and Army Commendation Medal.

== Post-military activities ==
=== POW/MIA activism ===
In the early 1980s, Gritz became involved in the Vietnam War POW/MIA issue, undertaking a series of private missions into Southeast Asia. His goal was to locate U.S. prisoners of war who, according to some beliefs, had been detained since the Vietnam War by the communist governments of Laos and Vietnam, specifically in areas such as Nhommarath.

Gritz's missions were initially supported by elements of the Defense Intelligence Agency in 1981, and later financed by high-profile donors like Clint Eastwood and Ross Perot. Operating primarily out of Thailand, Gritz used aliases such as "Richard Patrick Clark" to evade detection. Despite his efforts, Gritz was unable to provide any concrete evidence of the existence of the POWs when he testified as a witness before the House committee headed by Stephen Solarz in 1983.

Gritz's activities were heavily publicized and controversial, with critics deeming them haphazard and poorly executed. For instance, some commentators pointed out that supposedly secret missions involved women openly selling commemorative POW-rescue T-shirts in border towns. In his book Inside Delta Force, CSM Eric L. Haney, a former Delta Force operator, claims that the unit was twice told to prepare for a mission involving the rescue of American POWs from Vietnam. However, both times the missions were scrubbed, according to Haney, when Gritz suddenly appeared in the spotlight, drawing too much attention to the issue and making the missions too difficult to accomplish.

In 1983, Gritz and four of his associates were tried and convicted in Thailand of illegally importing radio equipment during their "Operation Lazarus Omega". One of them, a former Navy SEAL David Scott Weekly also known as "Doctor Death", was also later convicted in the U.S. of smuggling explosives. Thai authorities expressed concern that Vietnamese forces in Laos would retaliate against them for cross-border armed intrusions and threatened to jail Gritz for 20 years. Vietnamese Foreign Minister Nguyễn Cơ Thạch called Gritz's actions "a flagrant violation of the sovereignty of Laos that everyone should denounce."

In 1984, Gritz obtained the United States Air Force Academy class ring of a dead American POW, Air Force Captain Lance Sijan, who was posthumously awarded the Medal of Honor for evading capture for six weeks in the mountains of Laos, then stubbornly resisting the interrogation by his Vietnamese captors. Gritz got the ring from a Lao intermediary and attempted to convince the Sijan family to hold a gaudy Las Vegas press conference to publicize the ring's return. Implicit in this manipulation of a family's emotions was Gritz's indirect plea for money from the Sijans to cover the "expenses" he had accrued in obtaining their son's ring.

In 1986, Gritz traveled to Burma (now Myanmar) to interview drug kingpin Khun Sa about potential locations of U.S. POWs. He returned with a videotaped interview in which Khun Sa named several officials in the Reagan administration as allegedly involved in narcotics trafficking in Southeast Asia. Among those named was Richard Armitage, who later served as Deputy Secretary of State during George W. Bush's first term as president. During this time, Gritz established contacts with the Christic Institute, a progressive group that was then pursuing a lawsuit against the U.S. government over charges of drug trafficking in both Southeast Asia and Central America.

=== Political involvement and conspiracy research ===
In the 1988 election, Gritz was the candidate for Vice President of the United States on the Populist Party ticket. Initially, unbeknownst to him, he was presented as the running mate of former Ku Klux Klansman David Duke. Gritz withdrew early in the race and publicly distanced himself from Duke, opting instead to run for a Nevada Congressional seat. He was subsequently replaced by Floyd Parker on some ballots. Gritz stated that he accepted the party's nomination under the impression that he would be the running mate of James Traficant. After meeting Duke, Gritz described him as "a brash, untraveled, overly opinionated, bigoted young man" and declared, "I will not support anyone that I know to hate any class of Americans."

In 1989, Gritz established the Center for Action, which focused on various issues, primarily conspiracy theories. He attempted to build bridges among conspiracy theorists and unite activists from both the left and the right, organizing a conference in Las Vegas called "Freedom Call '90". Speakers at the conference included 1980 October Surprise theory researcher Barbara Honegger, Bill Davis of the Christic Institute, far-right writer Eustace Mullins, and others.

This shift in focus proved to be almost as controversial as his earlier missions searching for POWs. During the 1991 Persian Gulf War, Gritz opposed the war and linked it to a conspiracy theory alleging plans to implement a one-world government, known as the "New World Order". He appeared on Pacifica Radio stations in California as a guest several times, and for a short period he was sought after as a speaker to left-wing and anti-war audiences. However, during this period, he also became closely associated with the Christian Patriot movement on the right, and spoke at conferences sponsored by Christian Identity pastor Pete Peters. When these associations became known to those on the left, especially after the publication of a report by the Los Angeles-based group People Against Racist Terror labeling Gritz a "front man for fascism", left-wing audiences lost interest in Gritz, and the Christic Institute and Pacifica Radio ended any further association. He subsequently distanced himself from the movement.

==== 1992 presidential election ====
In the 1992 election, after failing to secure the U.S. Taxpayers' Party's nomination, Gritz ran for President of the United States, again under the Populist Party banner. His campaign slogan was "God, Guns and Gritz", and he published a political manifesto titled "The Bill of Gritz" (a play on his last name rhyming with "rights"). He advocated for staunch opposition to what he termed "global government" and the "New World Order", called for an end to all foreign aid, and proposed the abolition of the federal income tax and the Federal Reserve System. During the campaign, Gritz openly declared the United States to be a "Christian Nation", asserting that the country's legal statutes "should reflect unashamed acceptance of Almighty God and His Laws." He received 106,152 votes nationwide, constituting 0.14 percent of the popular vote. In Utah, he received 3.84 percent of the vote; and in Idaho, he received 2.13 percent of the vote. In Duchesne County, Utah and Oneida County, Idaho, his support exceeded ten percent; while in Franklin County, Idaho, Gritz received over twelve percent of the votes, falling just 23 votes short of pushing Bill Clinton into fourth place—a feat not achieved by a major party nominee in any county nationwide since 1916. As part of his campaign, Gritz proposed an idea to pay off the National debt by minting a coin at the Treasury and sending it to the Federal Reserve, a concept that predates the 2012 trillion-dollar coin idea. Among other proposals, the "Bill of Gritz" called for the complete closure of the border with Mexico and the dissolution of the Federal Reserve.

=== Religious and militia affiliations ===
In 1984, Gritz and his wife Claudia joined The Church of Jesus Christ of Latter-day Saints (LDS Church, a.k.a. the Mormons). In response to some of Gritz's extreme political statements, his stake president declined to renew Gritz's temple recommend until Gritz provided proof of federal income tax payment in line with LDS principles of paying one's financial obligations. Consequently, Gritz resigned from the LDS Church. In 1999, Gritz and his fourth wife Judy Kirsch became associated with the Church of Israel, a group with origins in the Latter Day Saint movement that later became involved with the Christian Identity movement. Gritz also became an adherent of what the Southern Poverty Law Center described as a "relatively mild version" of Christian Identity; he since distanced himself from the movement.

In 1994, Gritz and several partners, including former politician Jerry Gillespie, established a 200-acre survivalist community and paramilitary training center in Kamiah, Idaho, called Almost Heaven. Gritz left Almost Heaven in late 1998 shortly after attempting suicide by gunshot. Almost Heaven was already falling apart before his departure, due, in part, to conflicts with local authorities and residents, as well as internal power struggles; the community was near-defunct by 2003. Influenced by the Church of Israel's ideology, Gritz then relocated to Nevada and rebranded his Center for Action as the Fellowship of Eternal Warriors, a group of "warrior-priests" opposing what Gritz defined as the forces of evil.

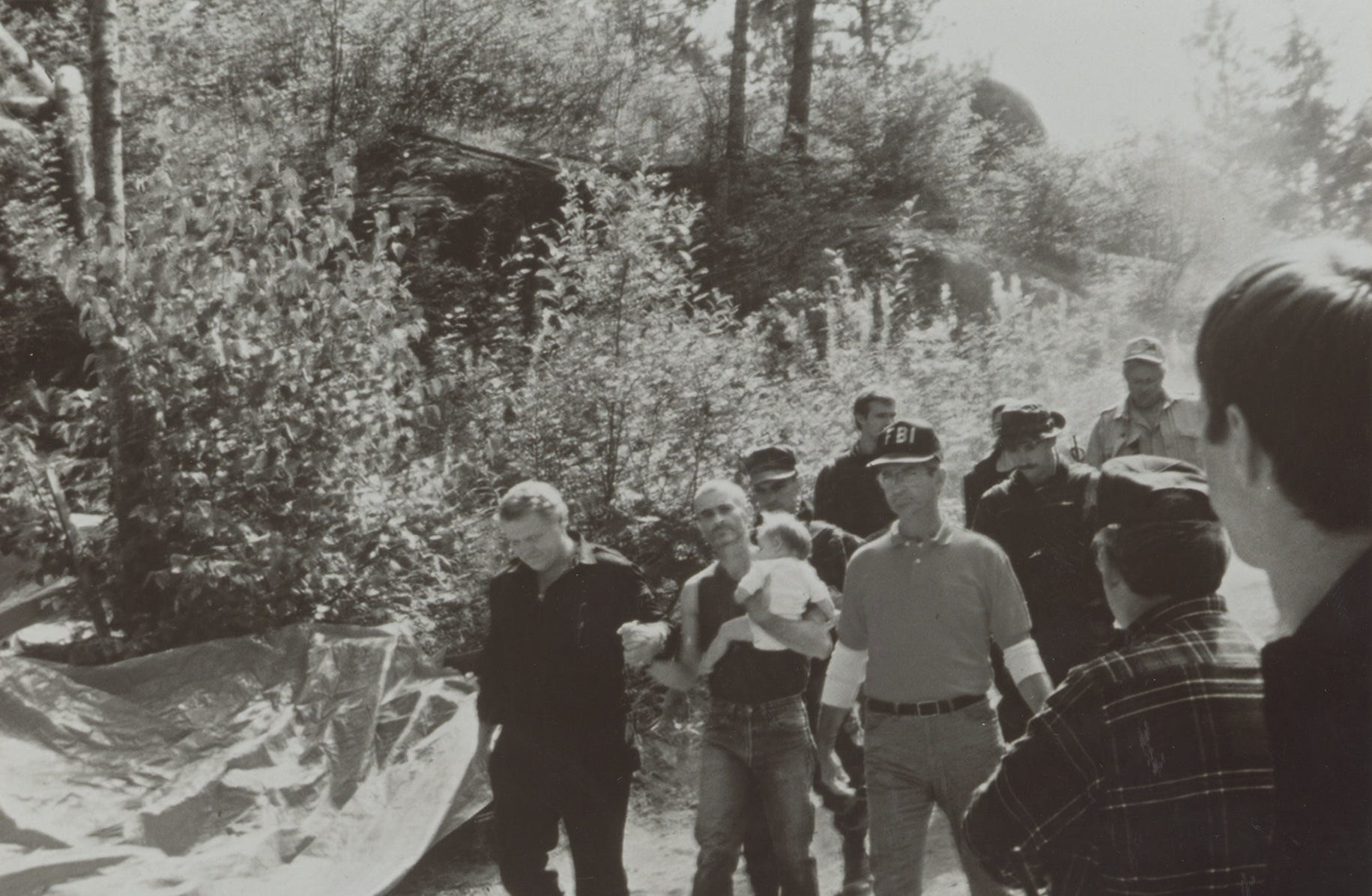
Bo Gritz at Ruby Ridge

Gritz used his influence within the Christian Patriot movement to mediate between legal authorities and far-right activists. In 1992, he mediated during the Ruby Ridge crisis involving fellow military veteran Randy Weaver. In 1996, Gritz unsuccessfully attempted to negotiate an end to the standoff involving the Montana Freemen, an anti-government White separatist militia group. After unsuccessful negotiations, Gritz left in frustration, predicting that the FBI would arrest the Freemen.

=== Later activities ===
In 1998, Gritz led an unsuccessful search for the Centennial Olympic Park bomber, Eric Rudolph, with the aim of persuading him to surrender to law enforcement. In 2005, he became an active protester in the Terri Schiavo case. On March 19, 2005, following the removal of Schiavo's feeding tube, Gritz was arrested for trespassing after attempting to enter the hospice where she was residing. Starting in 2014, Gritz hosted a radio show on Americanvoiceradio.com titled Freedom Call.

=== Writings ===
Gritz authored three books. His first, A Nation Betrayed, published in 1988, contains allegations of drug trafficking and a POW coverup, based on his interview with Khun Sa. His second book, Called To Serve, published in 1991, was an autobiography. It expands on the previous book, covering a wide range of conspiracy theories, including the assassination of John F. Kennedy and allegations of a conspiracy to establish a new world order. His third book, My Brother's Keeper, was published in 2003.

=== Death ===
Gritz died on February 27, 2026, at the age of 87.

== In popular culture ==
Reportedly, Gritz has at least partially inspired various dramatic characters including Colonel Kurtz in the 1979 film Apocalypse Now. The character of John "Hannibal" Smith from the 1980s television series The A-Team was loosely based on Gritz, as were some of Chuck Norris' film characters.

In 1983, actor William Shatner purchased the entertainment rights to Gritz's life story. Gritz played the character of Lt. Col. Steel, a highly fictionalized version of himself, in the 1990 film Rescue Force. Gritz was portrayed by Bob Gunton in the 1996 CBS television film The Siege at Ruby Ridge. Gritz's community, Almost Heaven, was featured in the episode "Survivalists" of Louis Theroux's Weird Weekends in 1998.

The 2017 documentary Erase and Forget saw filmmaker Andrea Luka Zimmerman follow Gritz for over a decade. It includes re-enactments of scenes from his life. Following the death of Gritz and after watching this film, journalist John Griswold was motivated to write an extended essay in The Common Reader titled "Bo Gritz, America's Special Operations Problem, and the Tragedy of Pulp Masculinity".

Gritz was portrayed by Vic Browder in the first episode of the 2018 television miniseries Waco.

== Works ==
=== Books ===
- Spycraft (c.1984–90). OCLC 49311464.
- A Nation Betrayed. (1988); Sandy Valley, Nev.: Lazarus Pub. Co. (1989). ISBN 978-0962223808, 0962223808. OCLC 19510209.
- Called to Serve. Sandy Valley, Nev.: Lazarus Pub. Co. (May 1991). Autobiography. ISBN 978-0916095383, 091609538X. OCLC 24775931.
- My Brother's Keeper. Sandy Valley, Nev.: Lazarus Pub. Co. (2003). OCLC 52549734.

=== Contributions ===
- Foreword to Shadows on the Wall, by Stan Krasnoff. Australia: Allen & Unwin (2003). ISBN 978-1865088877, 1865088870. OCLC 51068359.

=== Public speaking ===
- "A Nation Betrayed." A public lecture in the Cathedral of Saint Mary of the Assumption (June 1, 1990).

=== Filmography ===
- Louis Theroux's Weird Weekends (1998). Series 1 Episode 3 'Survivalists'.
- Millennium Factor: The Truth About Y2K (1999). Written and directed by Les Rayburn.
- Louis Theroux: Life on the Edge: Part 1 (2020).

Party political offices
Preceded by Maureen Kennedy Salaman	Populist nominee for Vice President of the United States; Withdrew; 1988; Served alongside: Trenton Stokes	Succeeded by Floyd Parker
Preceded by David Duke	Populist nominee for President of the United States; 1992	Party abolished
