= 1992 United States presidential election in Utah =

- November 3, 1992
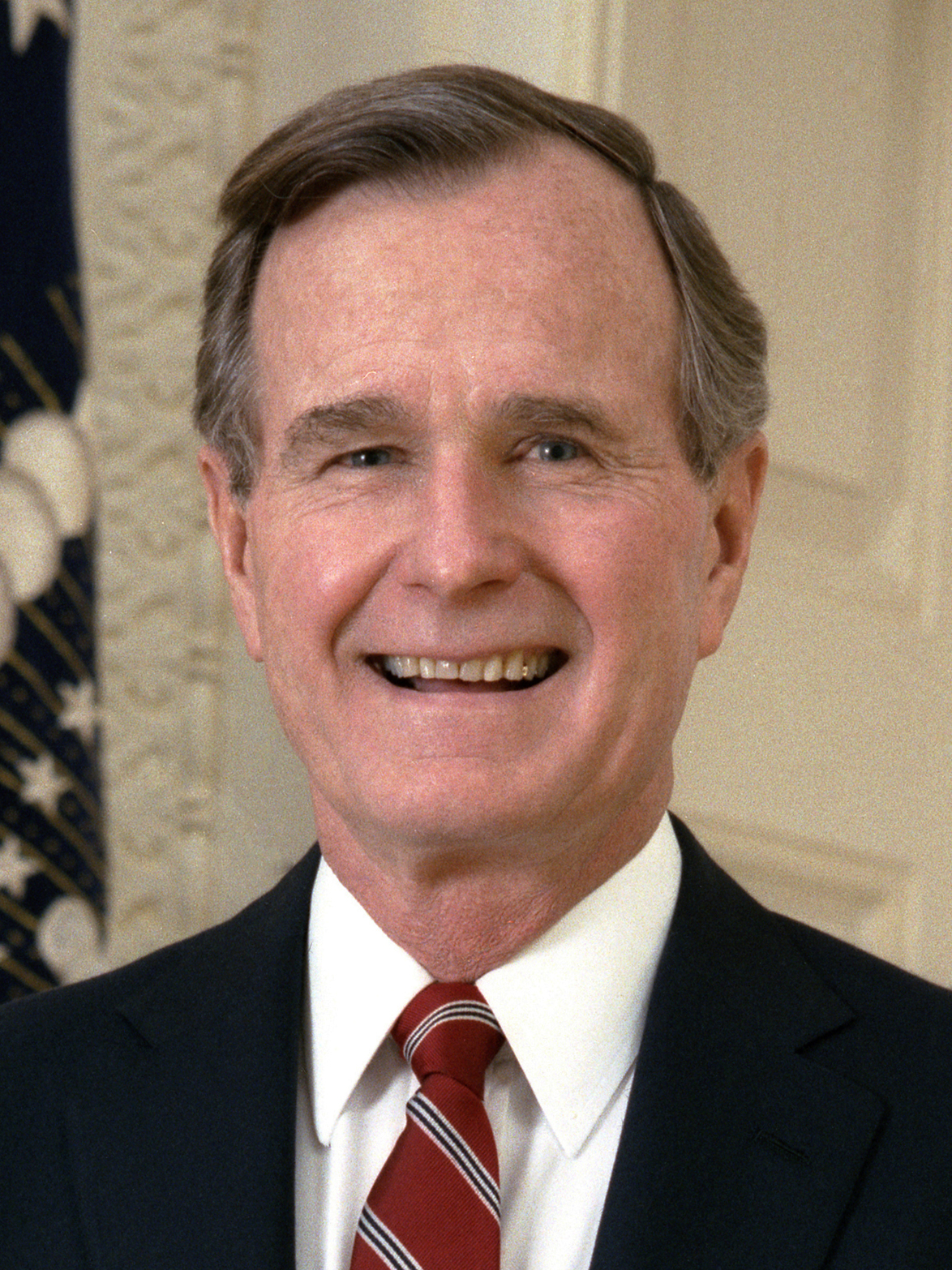

Nominee	George H. W. Bush	Ross Perot	Bill Clinton
Party	Republican	Independent	Democratic
Home state	Texas	Texas	Arkansas
Running mate	Dan Quayle	James Stockdale	Al Gore
Electoral vote	5	0	0
Popular vote	322,332	203,400	183,429
Percentage	43.36%	27.34%	24.65%
County results
Bush
30–40%
40–50%
50–60%
60–70%
Clinton
30–40%
50–60%
President before election
George H. W. Bush
Republican
Elected President
Bill Clinton
Democratic

The 1992 United States presidential election in Utah took place on November 3, 1992, and was part of the 1992 United States presidential election. Voters chose five representatives, or electors, to the Electoral College, who voted for president and vice president.

Utah was won by President George H. W. Bush (R-TX) by a 16.0 percent margin of victory. This was one of only two states, the other one being Maine, where Ross Perot (I-TX) came in second place. Unlike Maine, Perot did not win any counties, though he placed second in nineteen of twenty-nine to overcome Bill Clinton (D-AR) in the popular vote. Likewise it was the only time Bill Clinton finished third in a state, in either the 1992 or 1996 election, despite winning two counties. Utah and Maine (the latter of which Bush finished third behind Perot) in 1992 constitute the last time (as of the 2024 presidential election) that any major party candidate has finished third in a state, and the only time in a non-Confederate state since Robert M. La Follette finished ahead of John W. Davis in twelve states (Note: States where La Follette finished ahead of Davis in 1924 were Minnesota, North Dakota, Wisconsin (where La Follette finished first), California, Washington, South Dakota, Wyoming, Idaho, Iowa, Montana, Nevada and Oregon.) in 1924.

Utah was Perot's third-highest vote percentage behind Maine and Alaska.

== Results ==
1992 United States presidential election in Utah (Note: The FEC report mentions there having been 1 write-in vote for Norman Leonard Jackson. America Votes 20 (1993) also mentions there having been a single write-in vote, but does not list it in the county results, even though it's included in the total. In any case, this vote is not mentioned in the state's official report.)
Party	Candidate	Votes	%
Republican	George H. W. Bush (inc.)	322,632	43.36%
Independent	Ross Perot	203,400	27.34%
Democratic	Bill Clinton	183,429	24.65%
Populist	Bo Gritz	28,602	3.84%
Libertarian	Andre Marrou	1,900	0.26%
Natural Law	John Hagelin	1,319	0.18%
Independents for Economic Recovery	Lyndon LaRouche	1,089	0.15%
New Alliance	Lenora Fulani	414	0.06%
U.S. Taxpayers	Howard Phillips	393	0.05%
American	Robert J. Smith	292	0.04%
Socialist Workers	James Warren	200 (Note: Leip's Atlas says that the state's election report missed 70 votes for Warren in Salt Lake County, basing this conclusion off the county's individual return. This omission is not mentioned in America Votes 20; Scammon's compilations tend to note when such mistakes are made but in this case it is silent. The official statewide total for Warren is 200.)	0.03%
Campaign for a New Tomorrow	Ron Daniels	177	0.02%
Socialist	J. Quinn Brisben	151	0.02%
Total votes		743,998	100.00%

=== Results by county ===
County	George H. W. Bush Republican		Ross Perot Independent		Bill Clinton Democratic		Bo Gritz Populist		Other candidates Various parties		Margin (Note: Because Perot finished ahead of Clinton in Utah as a whole, all margins given are Bush minus Perot unless stated in the total for the county in question.)		Total votes cast
County	#	%	#	%	#	%	#	%	#	%	#	%	Total votes cast
Beaver	1,040	49.27%	330	15.63%	668	31.64%	52	2.46%	21	0.99%	372 (Note: In this county where Clinton ran ahead of Perot, the margin given is Bush vote minus Clinton vote.)	17.63%	2,111
Box Elder	7,712	49.58%	4,507	28.97%	2,186	14.05%	1,013	6.51%	137	0.88%	3,205	20.61%	15,555
Cache	15,971	51.98%	8,032	26.14%	4,973	16.19%	1,511	4.92%	238	0.77%	7,939	25.84%	30,725
Carbon	2,038	23.11%	2,002	22.71%	4,480	50.81%	235	2.67%	62	0.70%	-2,442	-27.70%	8,817
Daggett	172	38.91%	117	26.47%	122	27.60%	30	6.79%	1	0.23%	50	11.31%	442
Davis	39,087	48.05%	24,105	29.63%	14,924	18.35%	2,723	3.35%	511	0.63%	14,982	18.42%	81,350
Duchesne	1,983	43.44%	1,229	26.92%	772	16.91%	537	11.76%	44	0.96%	754	16.52%	4,565
Emery	1,643	36.43%	1,138	25.23%	1,349	29.91%	364	8.07%	16	0.35%	294	6.52%	4,510
Garfield	1,235	62.28%	355	17.90%	309	15.58%	79	3.98%	5	0.25%	880	44.38%	1,983
Grand	1,100	32.91%	991	29.65%	1,160	34.71%	44	1.32%	47	1.41%	-60	-1.80%	3,342
Iron	5,616	59.88%	1,693	18.05%	1,537	16.39%	440	4.69%	92	0.98%	3,923	41.83%	9,378
Juab	1,237	42.73%	616	21.28%	823	28.43%	209	7.22%	10	0.35%	414	14.30%	2,895
Kane	1,241	57.14%	534	24.59%	295	13.58%	85	3.91%	17	0.78%	707	32.55%	2,172
Millard	2,496	52.33%	1,064	22.31%	742	15.56%	417	8.74%	51	1.07%	1,432	30.02%	4,770
Morgan	1,339	45.54%	851	28.95%	520	17.69%	225	7.65%	5	0.17%	488	16.59%	2,940
Piute	429	56.97%	146	19.39%	169	22.44%	9	1.20%	0	0.00%	260	34.53%	753
Rich	525	59.93%	187	21.35%	154	17.58%	10	1.14%	0	0.00%	338	38.58%	876
Salt Lake	117,247	36.79%	91,968	28.86%	100,082	31.41%	6,444	2.02%	2,920	0.92%	17,165	5.38%	318,661
San Juan	2,004	46.23%	576	13.29%	1,639	37.81%	111	2.56%	5	0.12%	365	8.42%	4,335
Sanpete	2,995	44.80%	1,742	26.06%	1,302	19.48%	575	8.60%	71	1.06%	1,253	18.74%	6,685
Sevier	3,160	50.50%	1,671	26.70%	1,039	16.60%	329	5.26%	59	0.94%	1,489	23.80%	6,258
Summit	3,133	33.33%	3,060	32.56%	3,013	32.06%	128	1.36%	65	0.69%	73	0.77%	9,399
Tooele	3,676	35.79%	3,011	29.32%	3,270	31.84%	224	2.18%	90	0.88%	406	3.95%	10,271
Uintah	3,505	45.09%	2,250	28.94%	1,374	17.67%	589	7.58%	56	0.72%	1,255	16.15%	7,774
Utah	61,398	56.76%	24,558	22.70%	14,090	13.02%	7,410	6.85%	722	0.67%	36,840	34.06%	108,178
Wasatch	1,822	42.02%	1,234	28.46%	1,042	24.03%	178	4.11%	60	1.38%	588	13.56%	4,336
Washington	11,310	52.66%	4,623	21.53%	3,364	15.66%	2,037	9.49%	142	0.66%	6,687	31.13%	21,476
Wayne	706	57.63%	251	20.49%	236	19.27%	30	2.45%	2	0.16%	455	37.14%	1,225
Weber	26,812	39.30%	20,559	30.14%	17,795	26.09%	2,564	3.76%	486	0.71%	6,253	9.16%	68,216
Totals	322,632	43.36%	203,400	27.34%	183,429	24.65%	28,602	3.84%	5,935	0.80%	119,232	16.02%	743,998

==== Counties that flipped from Republican to Democratic ====
- Grand

== Electors ==
Technically the voters of Utah cast their ballots for electors: representatives to the Electoral College. Utah is allocated five electors because it has three congressional districts and two senators. All candidates who appear on the ballot or qualify to receive write-in votes must submit a list of five electors, who pledge to vote for their candidate and his or her running mate. Whoever wins a plurality of votes in the state is awarded all five electoral votes. Their chosen electors then vote for president and vice president. Although electors are pledged to their candidate and running mate, they are not obligated to vote for them. An elector who votes for someone other than his or her candidate is known as a faithless elector.

The electors of each state and the District of Columbia met in December 1992 to cast their votes for president and vice president. The Electoral College itself never meets as one body. Instead, the electors from each state and the District of Columbia met in their respective capitols.

All electors from Utah were pledged to and voted for George H. W. Bush and Dan Quayle.

== See also ==
- United States presidential elections in Utah
- Presidency of Bill Clinton
