= John Wesley Hall Jr. =

American legal author and attorney

- Education: Hendrix College (BA); University of Arkansas School of Law (JD)
- Occupations: Criminal defense attorney, legal author
- Organization(s): Law Offices of John Wesley Hall, Jr., P.A.
- Known for: Fourth Amendment scholarship; 50th president of the National Association of Criminal Defense Lawyers
- Website: johnwesleyhall.com

John Wesley Hall Jr. (born 1948) is an American legal author and criminal defense attorney in Little Rock, Arkansas. His writing focuses on Fourth Amendment law, trial practice, and professional responsibility in criminal defense. First published in 1982, his Search and Seizure reached a sixth edition in 2025. The book has been reviewed in legal journals and cited in later legal scholarship. He has argued two cases before the Supreme Court of the United States and served as the 50th president of the National Association of Criminal Defense Lawyers (NACDL).

== Legal scholarship ==
Hall's Search and Seizure was first published by the Lawyers Co-Operative Publishing Company in 1982. The sixth edition was published by LexisNexis in 2025.

The first edition was reviewed in the University of Richmond Law Review and the University of Arkansas at Little Rock Law Journal. Ronald J. Bacigal, a law professor at the University of Richmond, called it "a ready working tool for practicing attorneys" and contrasted its concise, practice-oriented approach with Wayne LaFave's larger academic treatise. William R. Wilson Jr., then a Little Rock attorney and later a U.S. district judge for the Eastern District of Arkansas, described Hall's book as a "seven hundred page masterpiece" on the Fourth Amendment. He wrote that it would be of value to professors, students, and practicing lawyers, and expressed hope that it would prove useful to the bench as well.

In a 2000 article in the Harvard Journal of Law & Public Policy, Timothy Lynch referred to Hall as "Fourth Amendment scholar John Wesley Hall, Jr." before quoting Search and Seizure. Elsewhere in the article, Lynch cited the treatise for historical Fourth Amendment material and for the doctrines of consent and exigent circumstances.

A 2024 comment in the George Mason Law Review cited the fifth edition of Search and Seizure in a discussion of Fourth Amendment standing after Rakas v. Illinois. The discussion included the continued use of "standing" as shorthand and the requirement that a defendant assert a violation of the defendant's own Fourth Amendment rights.

In State v. Reynolds (2001), the Washington Supreme Court cited the third edition of Hall's treatise while discussing the search of voluntarily abandoned property.

Hall wrote Trial Handbook for Arkansas Lawyers, published in Thomson Reuters' Arkansas Practice Series. In Hancock v. State (2011), the Arkansas Court of Appeals cited the handbook while discussing the rule that a trial judge may not act as a witness.

Hall publishes FourthAmendment.com, where he summarizes and comments on search-and-seizure decisions. In 2016, NACDL reported that the ABA Journal had named the site to its Top 100 Law Blog list.

== Legal ethics ==
Hall has also written about professional responsibility in criminal defense. The fourth edition of his Professional Responsibility in Criminal Defense Practice was published by Thomson Reuters in 2023.

From 1990 to 2005, Hall chaired NACDL's Ethics Advisory Committee. According to NACDL, he wrote or co-wrote its ethics advisory opinions, and at least 900 criminal lawyers consulted him on ethics questions arising in United States, Canadian, military, and international proceedings.

== Selected legal work ==
Hall argued two cases before the Supreme Court of the United States. In Lockhart v. Nelson (1988), he represented the respondent by appointment of the Court in a case involving double jeopardy and resentencing. In Wilson v. Arkansas (1995), he represented the petitioner and argued that the common-law knock-and-announce principle formed part of the Fourth Amendment's reasonableness inquiry. The Court agreed unanimously.

In 1988, Hall served as an expert in Franz v. Lockhart, a federal habeas corpus proceeding before Chief Judge G. Thomas Eisele in which third parties sought to prevent the execution of Ronald Gene Simmons after Simmons waived review of his 1988 capital conviction.

Hall later represented Christina Riggs, another Arkansas death-row prisoner who withdrew her appeals before her execution in 2000. The Arkansas Supreme Court identified Hall as her attorney in Riggs v. Humphrey; an Associated Press report also named him as her lawyer.

From 2004 to 2006, Hall was among the defense counsel for Samuel Hinga Norman in Prosecutor v. Norman, Fofana and Kondewa before the Special Court for Sierra Leone.

In 1986, after Ralph Perry Forbes named Satan as a defendant in a federal lawsuit, Hall agreed to represent Satan without fee. He moved to dismiss, arguing that Forbes had shown no basis for jurisdiction over the defendant: no evidence that Satan transacted business, owned property, or committed torts in Arkansas.

== Career and professional service ==
Hall received a B.A. in English from Hendrix College in 1970 and a J.D. from the University of Arkansas School of Law in 1973. He entered private criminal-defense practice in Little Rock in 1979.

Hall joined NACDL in 1983. He later served on its board and as an officer, becoming the organization's 50th president in 2008–2009.
