= Arkansas Educational Television Commission v. Forbes =

- Supreme Court of the United States

Decided May 18, 1998
- Full case name: Arkansas Educational Television Commission v. Forbes
- Citations: 523 U.S. 666 (more)

Holding
- State-owned public television networks are not required to invite minor party candidates with few supporters to major party debates because the networks are not public forums.

Court membership
- Chief Justice William Rehnquist Associate Justices John P. Stevens · Sandra Day O'Connor; Antonin Scalia · Anthony Kennedy; David Souter · Clarence Thomas; Ruth Bader Ginsburg · Stephen Breyer

Case opinions
- Majority: Kennedy
- Dissent: Stevens, joined by Souter, Ginsburg

Arkansas Educational Television Commission v. Forbes, 523 U.S. 666 (1998), was a United States Supreme Court case in which the court held that state-owned public television networks are not required to invite minor-party candidates with few supporters to major-party debates because the networks are not public forums.

The dispute was between the neo-Nazi candidate Ralph Perry Forbes and the Arkansas Educational Television Commission.
