= Erase and Forget =

- Theatrical release poster
- Directed by: Andrea Luka Zimmerman
- Written by: Andrea Luka Zimmerman, Taina Galis
- Produced by: Ameenah Ayub Allen; Andrea Luka Zimmerman; Gareth Evans (executive producer); Laerke Vindahl (associate producer); Michael Uwemedimo (associate producer)
- Cinematography: Andrea Luka Zimmerman; Taina Galis; Adam Philp
- Edited by: Taina Galis
- Music by: Adam Paroussos, Serin Kucuk (sound design)
- Distributed by: LUX
- Release date: 11 February 2017 (Berlin International Film Festival)
- Running time: 88 minutes
- Countries: United Kingdom; Denmark
- Language: English

Erase and Forget is a 2017 documentary film directed by Andrea Luka Zimmerman which charts the life of American ex-soldier Bo Gritz, in order to examine the links between Hollywood films and 'America's hidden wars'.

== Synopsis ==
Erase and Forget features interviews with Bo Gritz filmed over a ten-year period, alongside archival footage and images gleaned from the internet.

== Production and release ==
Erase and Forget is a Danish-British co-production, which was supported by The Wapping Project Commissions with funding from Women's Playhouse Trust and Arts Council England. The executive producer was Gareth Evans. It was developed out of early collaboration with Vision Machine.

Erase and Forget first screened at the 2017 Berlin Film Festival where it was nominated for the Glashütte Original Documentary Award. It screened in October 2017 at the London Film Festival, played in UK cinemas from 2 March 2018 and was internationally screened on online viewing platform MUBI in July and August 2018.

== Critical reaction ==
The Financial Times gave it 4 out of 5 stars and wrote "the film is so loopy you end up like Laocoön, wreathed by serpents of paradox and contradiction." Empire Magazine, Little White Lies, The Guardian, and Frieze, were some of the papers or magazines which connected the film to the presidency of Donald Trump and contemporary American politics, with Frieze describing it as "a portrait of Gritz as a kind of cipher for evolving 20th century American ideologies" and Empire describing it as a "disconcerting documentary, which also doubles as an insight into the American mindset that led to the election of Donald Trump". The film topped Sight & Sound's Five British Artists films of 2018.

There was some criticism around Gritz himself being a contentious character by the Times' Kevin Maher, questioning the possible platform Gritz was given by this film. Zimmerman responded saying that she made the film precisely because of his contentious role in popular and military culture.
