= 1988 United States presidential election in New Jersey =

- November 8, 1988
- Turnout: 77.35% (▼1.61%)

Nominee	George H. W. Bush	Michael Dukakis
Party	Republican	Democratic
Home state	Texas	Massachusetts
Running mate	Dan Quayle	Lloyd Bentsen
Electoral vote	16	0
Popular vote	1,743,192	1,320,352
Percentage	56.24%	42.60%

Bush
50–60%
60–70%
70–80%
80–90%
90–100%
Dukakis
50–60%
60–70%
70–80%
80–90%
90–100%
President before election
Ronald Reagan
Republican
Elected President
George H. W. Bush
Republican

The 1988 United States presidential election in New Jersey took place on November 8, 1988. All 50 states and the District of Columbia were part of the 1988 United States presidential election. Voters chose 16 electors to the Electoral College, which selected the president and vice president. New Jersey was won by incumbent Republican Vice President George H. W. Bush of Texas, who was running against Democratic Massachusetts Governor Michael Dukakis. Bush ran with Indiana Senator Dan Quayle while Dukakis ran with Texas Senator Lloyd Bentsen.

Bush carried New Jersey with 56.24% of the vote, while Dukakis received 42.60%, a 13.64% margin of victory. New Jersey weighed in for this election as almost 6 percentage points more Republican than the national average. Bush won 18 of New Jersey's 21 counties, with Dukakis only winning the heavily Democratic counties of Mercer, Essex, and Hudson.

As of the 2024 presidential election, this is the last time that New Jersey would vote Republican in a presidential election, as well as the last time that the Republican nominee has carried the following counties: Burlington, Camden, Middlesex, and Union. All of these counties would become reliably Democratic in every election that has followed, as northern suburban voters shifted away from the GOP in the 1990s. Gloucester County would not vote Republican again until 2016. Atlantic and Cumberland counties would not vote Republican again until 2024.

== Campaign ==
=== Opinion polling ===
Poll source	Date(s) administered	Sample size (Note: Key: A – all adults RV – registered voters LV – likely voters V – unclear)	Margin of error	Michael Dukakis (D)	George Bush (R)	Other/ Undecided
The Star-Ledger/Eagleton	May 18–26, 1988	570 LV	±4.2%	50%	36%	15%
The Star-Ledger/Eagleton	May 18–26, 1988	570 LV	±4.2%	54%	40%	6%
The Star-Ledger/Eagleton	September 16–22, 1988	505 LV	±4.5%	44%	47%	9%
The Star-Ledger/Eagleton	September 16–22, 1988	505 LV	±4.5%	47%	49%	4%
The Star-Ledger/Eagleton	September 26–29, 1988	514 LV	±4.5%	42%	47%	11%
The Star-Ledger/Eagleton	September 26–29, 1988	514 LV	±4.5%	46%	49%	5%
The Star-Ledger/Eagleton	October 17–25, 1988	774 RV	±3.5%	38%	52%	10%
The Star-Ledger/Eagleton	October 17–25, 1988	774 RV	±3.5%	39%	55%	6%
The Star-Ledger/Eagleton	November 3–6, 1988	1,183 RV	±2.9%	35%	54%	11%
The Star-Ledger/Eagleton	November 3–6, 1988	1,183 RV	±2.9%	37%	56%	7%
The Star-Ledger/Eagleton	November 3–6, 1988	954 LV	±3.3%	35%	54%	11%
The Star-Ledger/Eagleton	November 3–6, 1988	954 LV	±3.3%	37%	56%	7%

== Results ==
1988 United States presidential election in New Jersey
Party	Candidate	Votes	Percentage	Electoral votes
Republican	George H. W. Bush	1,743,192	56.24%	16
Democratic	Michael Dukakis	1,320,352	42.60%	0
Peace and Freedom Party	Herbert Lewin	9,953	0.32%	0
Libertarian	Ron Paul	8,421	0.27%	0
New Alliance Party	Lenora Fulani	5,139	0.17%	0
Progressive	Eugene McCarthy	3,454	0.11%	0
Socialist	Willa Kenoyer	2,587	0.08%	0
America First	David Duke	2,446	0.08%	0
Socialist Workers Party	James Warren	2,298	0.07%	0
Workers World	Larry Holmes	1,020	0.03%	0
Socialist Equality Party	Edward Winn	691	0.02%	0
Totals		3,099,553	100.0%	16
Voter turnout (voting age/registered)				52%/77%

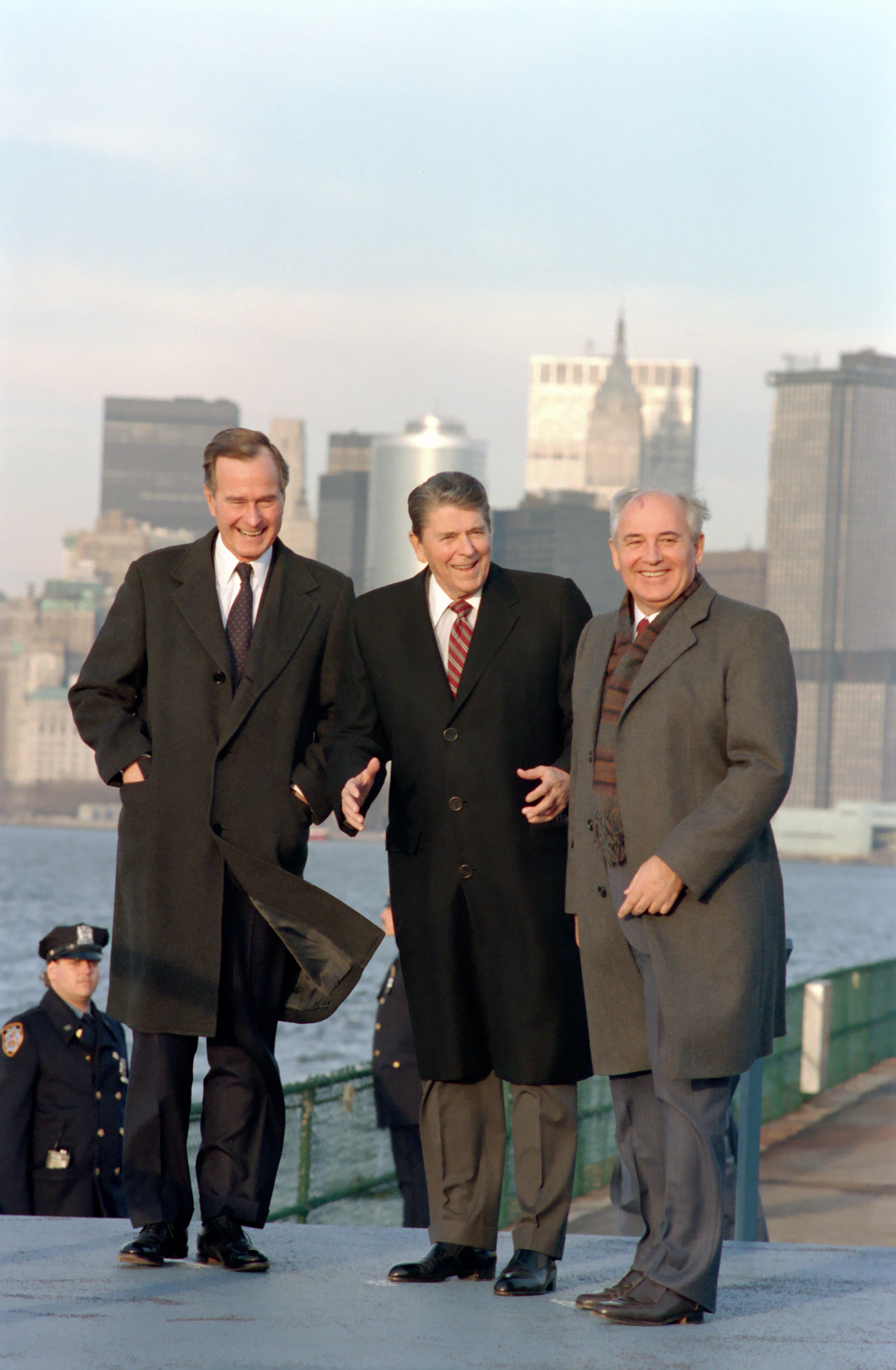
International policy with the buckling Soviet Union was a critical component of the political landscape in the late 1980s. Vice President Bush can be seen here standing with President Ronald Reagan and Soviet General Secretary Mikhail Gorbachev, on the New York waterfront, 1988.

=== Results by county ===
County	George H.W. Bush Republican		Michael Dukakis Democratic		Various candidates Other parties		Margin		Total votes cast
County	#	%	#	%	#	%	#	%	Total votes cast
Atlantic	44,748	56.33%	34,047	42.86%	647	0.81%	10,701	13.47%	79,442
Bergen	226,885	58.19%	160,655	41.20%	2,393	0.61%	66,230	16.99%	389,933
Burlington	87,416	58.30%	61,140	40.77%	1,393	0.93%	26,276	17.53%	149,949
Camden	100,072	51.98%	90,704	47.12%	1,739	0.90%	9,368	4.86%	192,515
Cape May	28,738	65.14%	15,105	34.24%	274	0.62%	13,633	30.90%	44,117
Cumberland	26,024	53.83%	21,869	45.23%	456	0.94%	4,155	8.60%	48,349
Essex	111,491	40.25%	156,098	56.36%	9,378	3.39%	-44,607	-16.11%	276,967
Gloucester	51,708	58.68%	35,479	40.26%	930	1.06%	16,229	18.42%	88,117
Hudson	84,334	45.72%	98,507	53.40%	1,622	0.88%	-14,173	-7.68%	184,463
Hunterdon	31,907	69.09%	13,758	29.79%	517	1.12%	18,149	39.30%	46,182
Mercer	65,384	48.31%	68,712	50.77%	1,249	0.92%	-3,328	-2.46%	135,345
Middlesex	143,422	54.30%	117,149	44.35%	3,548	1.34%	26,273	9.95%	264,119
Monmouth	147,320	61.14%	91,844	38.12%	1,793	0.74%	55,476	23.02%	240,957
Morris	127,420	68.05%	58,721	31.36%	1,108	0.59%	68,699	36.69%	187,249
Ocean	124,587	65.38%	64,474	33.83%	1,497	0.79%	60,113	31.55%	190,558
Passaic	88,070	55.91%	66,254	42.06%	3,189	2.02%	21,816	13.85%	157,513
Salem	15,240	59.52%	9,956	38.88%	410	1.60%	5,284	20.64%	25,606
Somerset	67,658	63.71%	37,406	35.22%	1,129	1.06%	30,252	28.49%	106,193
Sussex	36,086	71.94%	13,676	27.26%	398	0.79%	22,410	44.68%	50,160
Union	112,967	54.27%	93,158	44.75%	2,028	0.97%	19,809	9.52%	208,153
Warren	21,715	64.50%	11,640	34.57%	311	0.92%	10,075	29.93%	33,666
Totals	1,743,192	56.24%	1,320,352	42.60%	36,009	1.16%	422,840	13.64%	3,099,553

Counties that flipped from Republican to Democratic

- Hudson
- Mercer

=== By congressional district ===
Bush won 12 of 14 congressional districts, including six that elected Democrats.

District	Dukakis	Bush	Representative
1st	47.5%	52.5%	James Florio
2nd	41.2%	58.8%	William J. Hughes
3rd	37.5%	62.5%	James J. Howard
3rd	37.5%	62.5%	Frank Pallone
4th	44.2%	55.8%	Chris Smith
5th	33.3%	66.7%	Marge Roukema
6th	46.7%	53.3%	Bernard J. Dwyer
7th	40.7%	59.3%	Matthew J. Rinaldo
8th	45.5%	54.5%	Robert A. Roe
9th	46.4%	53.6%	Robert Torricelli
10th	74.3%	19.7%	Peter Rodino
10th	74.3%	19.7%	Donald M. Payne
11th	35.2%	64.8%	Dean Gallo
12th	37.7%	62.3%	Jim Courter
13th	38.2%	61.8%	Jim Saxton
14th	55.1%	44.9%	Frank Guarini

== See also ==
- United States presidential elections in New Jersey
- Presidency of George H. W. Bush
