= Andrea Luka Zimmerman =

German-born, UK-based artist, filmmaker, and cultural activist

Andrea Luka Zimmerman (they/them)
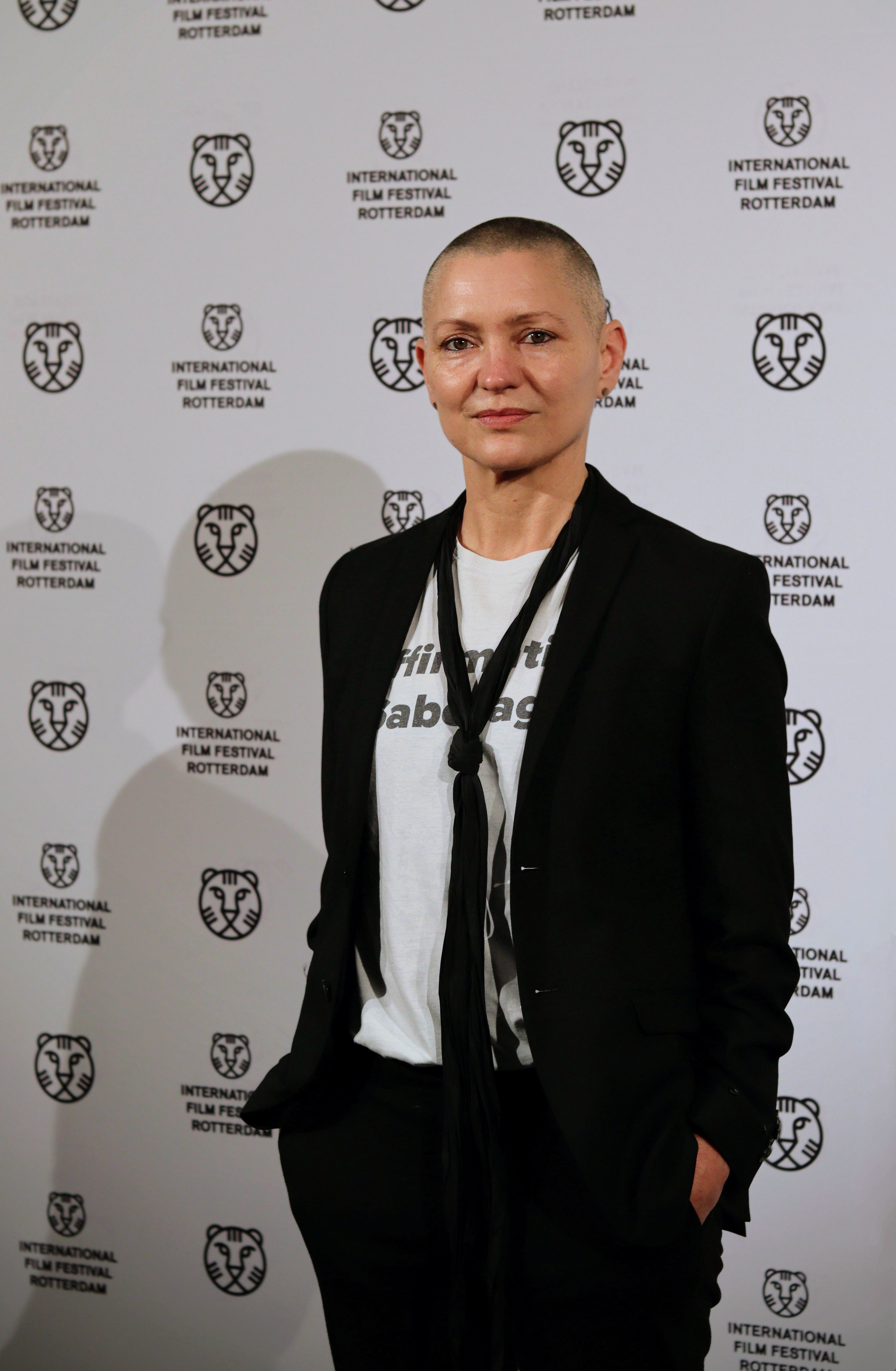
- Zimmerman at the IFFR 2024
- Born: Andrea Luka Zimmerman; 1969 (age 56–57); Munich, Germany
- Education: Central St Martins (B.A.); Central Saint Martins (Ph.D.)
- Known for: Vision Machine; Fugitive Images
- Notable work: Here For Life; Erase and Forget
- Website: andrealukazimmerman.com

Andrea Luka Zimmerman (they/them) is a German-born, UK-based artist, filmmaker, and cultural activist. Their work focuses on themes of social injustice, class, and the experience of marginalized communities. They received the Jarman Award in 2020.

Zimmerman's films include Wayfaring Stranger (2024), the Artangel-produced Here For Life (2019), Erase and Forget (2017), Estate, a Reverie (2015), and Taskafa, Stories of the Street (2013).

In December 2024, Second Run Films released a 2-disc Blu-ray special edition of their films. That same month, the British Film Institute presented the UK premiere of Wayfaring Stranger (2024) and a season dedicated to their work.

== Life and career ==
Andrea Luka Zimmerman was born in Munich, Germany, in 1969, and grew up on several large public housing estates, including the Wohnring in Neuperlach. They left school at 16 to become a hairdresser at Vidal Sassoon. After moving to London in 1991, studied at Central Saint Martins, where they graduated with a BA in 1997 and a PhD (Secreting History: Spectral and Spectacular Representations of Political Violence) in 2006.

Zimmerman co-founded the film collective **Vision Machine** in 2001, an experimental filmmaking group created to research, analyse and respond to conditions of economic, political and military power. Founding members included Christine Cynn, Joshua Oppenheimer, and Michael Uwemedimo. The collective collaborated on the Academy Award-nominated documentary The Look of Silence.

In 2009, Zimmerman co-founded the cultural collective **Fugitive Images** alongside Lasse Johansson and David Roberts.

Since January 2022, Zimmerman has been a professor of Possible Film at Central Saint Martins.

== Films ==
Zimmerman's film Taskafa, Stories of the Street (2013) explores resistance and co-existence through the lives of the street dogs of Istanbul. The film features text and readings by John Berger and references the Hayırsızada dog massacre of 1911.

Estate, a Reverie (2015) was filmed over seven years, documenting the dismantling of the Haggerston Estate in East London. The film records the lives and stories of residents affected by the estate's demolition and subsequent social housing changes. The film was nominated for the Grierson Award and is held in the Arts Council Collection.

Erase and Forget (2017) is a documentary portrait of Bo Gritz, a US Special Forces veteran and anti-communist militant who reputedly inspired the Rambo character. The film examines military power and social conscience through Gritz's life. It premiered at the Berlin Film Festival, where it was nominated for the Glashutte Original Documentary Award. Little White Lies said the film "A definitive film of the Trump era."

Here for Life (2019) is a collaboration with theatre-maker Adrian Jackson. The film follows ten Londoners who navigate the city outside of mainstream structures, finding solidarity and questioning social inequalities. The film won Special Mention in the Cineasti Del Presente international competition at the Locarno Film Festival, 2019, and first prize (feature film) at the Palmares Festival De Cinema En Ville! - 2020. Sight & Sound described the film as "A film of great compassion and political and aesthetic ambition."

Wayfaring Stranger (2024) charts the life of an itinerant character and explores themes of finding a liveable life on one's own terms and without conflict. The film features a spoken word text by American poet Eileen Myles. It had its world premiere at the Rotterdam Film Festival on 25 January 2024, and was described by the International Cinephile Society as "An immersive and contemplative work of singular cinema of the kind the world sadly sees far too little”.

While the Gods Were Busy with Another Child (2026), a film described by Georgia Korossi for a British Film Institute review as a 'layered exploration of memory, survivorhood and the archives we inherit'. The film features in the omnibus Three Ways of Returning (2026), which had its World Premiere at the Rotterdam Film Festival on 1 January 2026 as part of their major Feminist Focus programme (NOW).

here and not here (2026), a diary film in 15 chapters, filmed in the Occupied West Bank and Golan Heights, premiered at CPH:DOX film festival.

== Art and projects ==
Art exhibitions and projects include i am here (2009–2014), a public artwork in Haggerston, Hackney, where large photos of residents were placed over the windows of vacated flats in a building undergoing gentrification.

Other exhibitions include Real Estates (2015), co-curated with David Roberts at PEER with LUX, which addressed issues of housing and social justice in East London, and Common Ground (2017) at Spike Island, Bristol, which explored strategies of social and cultural resistance. Civil Rites (2017) was made in response to a speech given by Martin Luther King Jr. at Newcastle University and was shown at the Tyneside Cinema Gallery and the London Open triennial at Whitechapel Gallery in 2018.

== Awards ==
- 2020: **Filmlondon Jarman Award** (Winner)

== Filmography ==
- The Delmarva Chicken of Tomorrow (short, 2003)
- The Globalisation Tapes (2003) (additional editor and camera)
- The Last Biscuit (short, 2005)
- The Ramp (short, 2010)
- Merzschmerz (Film and Video Umbrella) (short, 2012)
- Towards Estate (short, 2012)
- Taskafa, Stories of the Street (2013)
- Estate, A Reverie (feature, 2015)
- More Utopias Now (Channel 4 Random Acts), (short, 2016)
- Lower Street, a Night's Journey (Tintype) (short, 2016)
- Civil Rites (Tyneside Cinema) (short, 2017)
- Erase and Forget (feature, 2017)
- Onions in the Plughole (short, 2018), on artist Marcia Farquhar
- Here For Life (Artangel) (feature, 2019)
- Wayfaring Stranger (The Wapping Project) (feature, 2024)
- Three Ways of Returning (omnibus feature film, 81 min., co-directed with Mania Akbari and Xiaolu Guo) (2026) - World Premiere at International Film Festival Rotterdam 2026.
- While the Gods Were Busy With Another Child (short, 2026) - Premiere at LSFF 2026 and internationally at IFFR 2026, part of the Three Ways of Returning omnibus.
- here and not here (short, 2026) - Premiere at CPH:DOX

== Bibliography ==
- Contribution in Women and Global Documentary, Practices and Perspectives in the 21st Century; Feminism as Documentary Method: A Conversation. Bloomsbury, 2025
- Zimmerman, Andrea Luka, and Johansson, Lasse. Estate: Art, Politics and Social Housing in Britain. Myrdle Court Press, 2010.
- Shiri Shalmy and Andrea Luka Zimmerman (co-editors). Doorways: Women, Homelessness, Trauma and Resistance. House Sparrow Press, 2019.
- Contribution in Strangers Within: Documentary as Encounter. Prototype, 2022.
- Contribution in Truth, Dare or Promise: Art and Documentary Revisited. Cambridge Scholars Publishing, 2013.
