= Sean David Morton =

American psychic and remote viewer

- Born: Sean David Morton; October 1, 1958; Santa Monica, California
- Died: December 18, 2024 (aged 66); Mission Viejo, California
- Education: University of Southern California (B.A.) in Political Science (B.F.A.) in Performing Arts
- Occupations: Psychic, Author, Filmmaker,

Sean David Morton was a self-described psychic, ufologist and alleged remote viewer who referred to himself as "America's Prophet." Until legal troubles led to his incarceration in federal prison, he also hosted radio shows, authored books, and made documentary films about the paranormal. In 2010, Morton was charged with civil securities fraud. The director of the New York regional office of the U.S. Securities and Exchange Commission (SEC) stated that "Morton's self-proclaimed psychic powers were nothing more than a scam to attract investors and steal their money." In 2016, Morton was indicted on federal tax-related charges, and was found guilty in April 2017. He served a federal prison sentence.

== Early life ==
Morton spent his early years in Texas and high school years in Atherton, California where he attended Woodside High School, graduating in the class of 1976. He alleges he was sent to a military school as well. He attended University of Southern California, graduating with a Bachelor of Arts in Political Science and a Bachelor of Fine Arts in Performing Arts. His father was a public relations official for TRW, and his mother was radio/TV personality and health author Maureen Kennedy Salaman. Both parents were fundamentalist Christians but Morton became a self-described "New Age thinker". He has said that as a child he often heard astronauts describe their experiences with extraterrestrials. Although he claims to have had extensive contact with astronauts in his childhood, in later life Morton alleged that the National Aeronautics and Space Administration was "fake."

Morton became interested in the paranormal after a 1985 trip to England and Ireland where he became involved in what he calls either the Green Stone saga or the Meonia Stone saga. He later went to India where he met with the Dalai Lama. Morton claims that while in India, he was taught the secrets of astral time travel by Nepalese monks and that they also helped him to develop a system of remote viewing.

== Doctorate ==
Morton used the title "Doctor" in formal situations such as conference presentations. The Aquarian Radio website says he received his Ph.D. in therapeutic psychology from the International Institute of Health and Spiritual Sciences in Montreal, Canada, in 2005. Also known as the International College of Spiritual & Psychic Sciences, this institution offers a four-part curriculum. The "Level V program", claimed to be the equivalent of a doctorate, requires 120 graduate credits for a fee of $40 CAN per credit.

== Work ==
Between 1985 and 1996, Morton produced documentaries on subjects including the Chupacabra and Bigfoot. He also led tours around Area 51. Morton suggested that aliens from Area 51 were from "Krondac," a planet 800 light-years away.

Morton was the subject of an article by the website UFO Watchdog, "The Shameless Psychic and His Prophecy of Lies", which threw doubt on many of Morton's claims. Morton filed a lawsuit against the site for libel but the case was dismissed.

Morton also conducted workshops based on sovereign citizen ideology, in which he claimed that Americans could "emancipate" themselves from the Federal government and promoted means to wipe out mortgages, tax bills and student loans.

== Securities fraud charges ==
From 1996 to 2010, Morton ran Delphi Associates Newsletter (DAN), a print and online publication in which he made economic, financial and political predictions. In 2001, Morton predicted that the Dow Jones Industrial Average would rise to somewhere around 12,000 in December. The index actually ended at 8,341. In 2007, he founded The Delphi Investment Group to allow investors to profit from trading in world currencies based on his predictions.

On March 7, 2010, Morton was charged with civil securities fraud. He is alleged to have defrauded around 100 customers of $6 million between 2006 and 2007. According to the SEC, only a fraction of the money received by Morton went into foreign exchange trading accounts, with the rest diverted to shell companies run by Morton.

In 2009, Morton attempted to file suit against the SEC for harassment, but the suit was dismissed.

In February 2013, Morton was ordered by a judge to pay $11.5 million to the SEC within 14 days.

== U.S. federal criminal tax convictions ==
Morton was arrested on January 31, 2016 after being charged with 51 counts of issuing false instruments, 4 counts of filing false federal income tax documents, and one count of conspiracy to defraud the Internal Revenue Service (IRS). The latter charge originated because the Morton filed several tax returns claiming refunds due on non-existent overpayments. In one such case the IRS failed to cross-check sufficiently and actually issued a check for $480,323, which Morton immediately transferred into other accounts. He faced up to 650 years in federal prison. On April 7, 2017, Sean Morton was found guilty of 51 charges by a Federal court jury. The jury gave its verdict after only two hours. Sentencing was set for June 19, 2017.

Sean David Morton failed to appear for his June 19 sentencing hearing. A federal arrest warrant was issued immediately. On August 21, 2017, Morton was arrested and taken into custody.

On September 18, 2017, Morton was sentenced to six years in prison, and was ordered to pay $480,322 in restitution to the Internal Revenue Service. The Court also ordered supervised release for five years after Morton's prison term, with the condition that he "shall not engage . . . in any business involving the sale of financial instruments or providing debt relief services . . . ."

Morton was released from prison in 2021.

== Death ==
Morton died on December 18, 2024 in Mission Viejo, California at the age of 66 from throat cancer.

== Media appearances ==
- 1992 UFOs and the Alien Presence
- 1997 Area 51: The Alien Interview
- 2006 Fastwalkers
- 2010 Metaphysia 2012
- 2011 Apocalypse According to Doris
- 2012 New Humanity
- 2012 Beyond the Edge
- 2012 Ancient Aliens
- 2013 UFO Chronicles
- 2023 Podcast But Outside

== Publications ==
- Morton, Sean; Haley, Wayne (2006). Black Seraph: A Novel of Espionage and Intrigue. BookSurge. p. 188. ISBN 9781419638602. OCLC 159993340.
- Morton, Sean (2011). Sands of Time. Starlocke Publishing. ASIN B00CPT04OG.
