= Maureen Kennedy Salaman =

American proponent of alternative medicine (1936–2006)

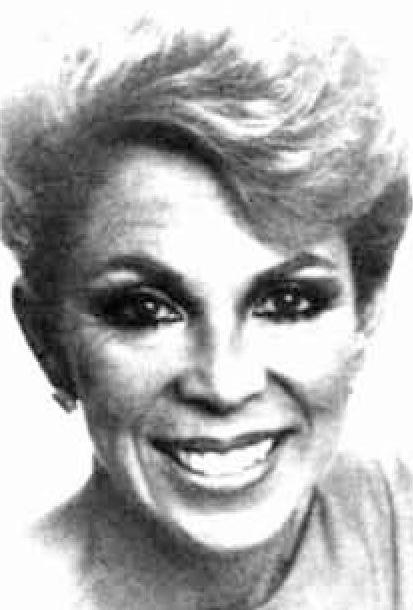
- Born: Maureen Kennedy; April 4, 1936; Glendale, California, U.S.
- Died: August 17, 2006 (aged 70); Atherton, California, U.S.
- Political party: Populist
- Spouses: Gerard Morton; Frank Salaman
- Children: 2, including Sean

Maureen Kennedy Salaman (April 4, 1936 – August 17, 2006) was an American author, proponent of alternative medicine, and candidate of the American Independent Party for Vice President of the United States in the 1984 election.

== Biography ==
Salaman was born in 1936 in Glendale, California. Her father, Ted Kennedy, served in the United States Navy and was killed in World War II when Maureen was a child. The family then relocated to San Mateo County, California.

Salaman claimed to be a nutritionist with a Master of Science degree from Donsbach University, an unaccredited entity, and was prominently involved in alternative medicine. She was elected president of the National Health Federation, an alternative medicine lobbying group, in 1982. She held that position, with two interruptions, until her death. Critics noted that she had been "very active in promoting questionable cancer remedies". Psychiatrist Stephen Barrett of Quackwatch wrote that her books "contain hundreds of unsubstantiated suggestions for using foods, dietary supplements, and herbs for a wide range of diseases and conditions."

Salaman was nominated on the far-right American Independent Party's ticket in 1984 along with Bob Richards, a former Olympic pole vaulter. They received 66,324 votes (0.07%).

== Personal life ==
Salaman married Gerard Morton in 1957, and that marriage produced two children, Sean and Colleen. The couple divorced, and after several years she married Frank Salaman. In 1976, Frank Salaman was charged with conspiracy to smuggle laetrile into the United States. He was found guilty by a jury in 1977, fined $10,000, and placed on probation for three years. Maureen Salaman was an outspoken advocate of laetrile usage as a cancer preventive and treatment. In 1999, she married a third time, to Ross Burdette Gordon.

Salaman died at her home in Atherton, California in 2006 from pancreatic cancer.

== Selected publications ==
- Nutrition: The Cancer Answer (1984)
- The Diet Bible: The Bible for Dieters (1994)
- Nutrition: The Cancer Answer II (1995)
- How to Renew You: The Complete Primer on Age Reversal (2003)
