= Populist Party (United States, 1984) =

- First Secretary: Willis Carto
- Founded: 1984; 42 years ago
- Dissolved: 1996; 30 years ago
- Ideology: Right-wing populism White nationalism White supremacy
- Political position: Far-right

The Populist Party was a political party in the United States between 1984 and 1996. It was conservative and often white nationalist in its ideology. The party was unrelated to the original American Populist Party or other American parties that have used the same name. Willis Carto helped found the Populist Party, which eventually served as an electoral vehicle for the former Knights of the Ku Klux Klan leader, David Duke. The party was also known as the "America First" party.

== 1984 presidential election ==
In the 1984 presidential election, athlete and minister Bob Richards ran for president of the United States on the newly formed far-right, Populist Party ticket. He and running mate Maureen Salaman earned 62,646 votes.

== 1988 presidential election ==
In the 1988 presidential election, white nationalist David Duke was the Populist Party's nominee for President of the United States. In some states, the vice presidential nominee was Floyd Parker, while in other states it was Trenton Stokes. Parker replaced Bo Gritz, who had initially agreed to act as the party's nominee. However, Gritz pulled out when he discovered that the presidential nominee would be Duke rather than James Traficant. (Gritz ran for a Nevada seat in the House of Representatives instead.) The Populist Party ticket garnered 47,047 votes, for 0.04 percent of the national popular vote.

== 1992 presidential election ==
Bo Gritz was on the ballot in eighteen states (161 Electoral Votes). Those states with a lighter shade are states in which he was an official write-in candidate.

In the 1992 presidential election, the Populist Party nominated Bo Gritz for president and Cyril Minett for vice president. Under the campaign slogan "God, Guns and Gritz" and publishing his political manifesto "The Bill of Gritz" (playing on his last name rhyming with "rights"), he called for staunch opposition to "global government" and "The New World Order", ending all foreign aid, and abolishing federal income tax and the Federal Reserve System. During the campaign, Gritz openly declared the United States to be a "Christian Nation", asserting that the country's legal statutes "should reflect unashamed acceptance of Almighty God and His Laws."

Gritz received 106,152 votes nationwide, or 0.14 per cent of the popular vote. In two states he had a respectable showing for a third party candidate: Utah, where he received 3.84 per cent of the vote, and Idaho, where he received 2.13 per cent of the vote. In some counties, his support topped 10%, and in Franklin County, Idaho, was only a few votes away from pushing Bill Clinton into fourth place in the county.

The party ran candidates for a few other offices as well that year. Rita Gum got 0.47% in the Utah gubernatorial election, Anita Morrow 2.31% in the Utah Senate election, Harry Tootle 0.89% in the Nevada Senate election, Don Golden 1.05% in the race for Nevada's 2nd congressional district, and Ki R. Nelson 1.6% in the election for Colorado's 3rd congressional district.

== Dissolution ==
By 1996, the party had collapsed. It did not nominate any candidates for the 1996 presidential election or any other election.

== Presidential tickets ==
Year	Presidential nominee	Vice-Presidential nominee	Votes
1984	Bob Richards	Maureen K Salaman	66,324 (0.07%)
1988	Dave Duke; Grand Wizard (campaign)	Floyd Parker; Trenton Stokes	47,004 (0.05%)
1992	Bo Gritz	Cyril Minett	106,152 (0.10%)
