= 1996 Republican Party vice presidential candidate selection =

1996 Republican vice presidential nomination
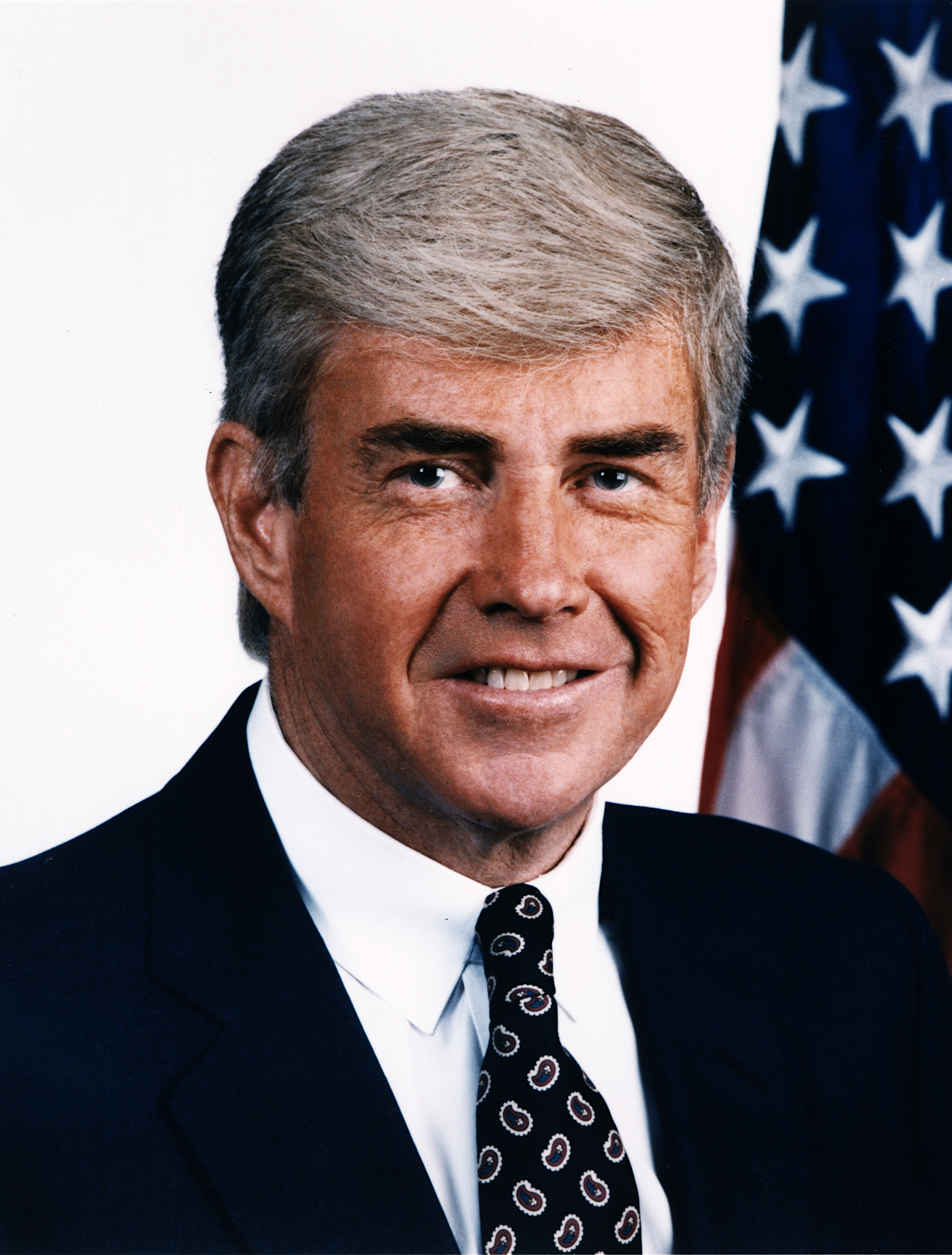
Nominee	Jack Kemp
Home state	New York
Previous Vice Presidential nominee
Dan Quayle
Vice Presidential nominee
Jack Kemp

This article lists those who were potential candidates for the Republican nomination for Vice President of the United States in the 1996 election. Former Kansas senator Bob Dole won the 1996 Republican nomination for President of the United States, and chose former Secretary of Housing and Urban Development Jack Kemp as his running mate. Dole chose Kemp as his running mate in order to solidify support among the conservative wing of the Republican Party, despite the mutual personal distaste the two candidates had for each other. The Dole–Kemp ticket ultimately lost to the Clinton–Gore ticket in the general election.

== Shortlist ==
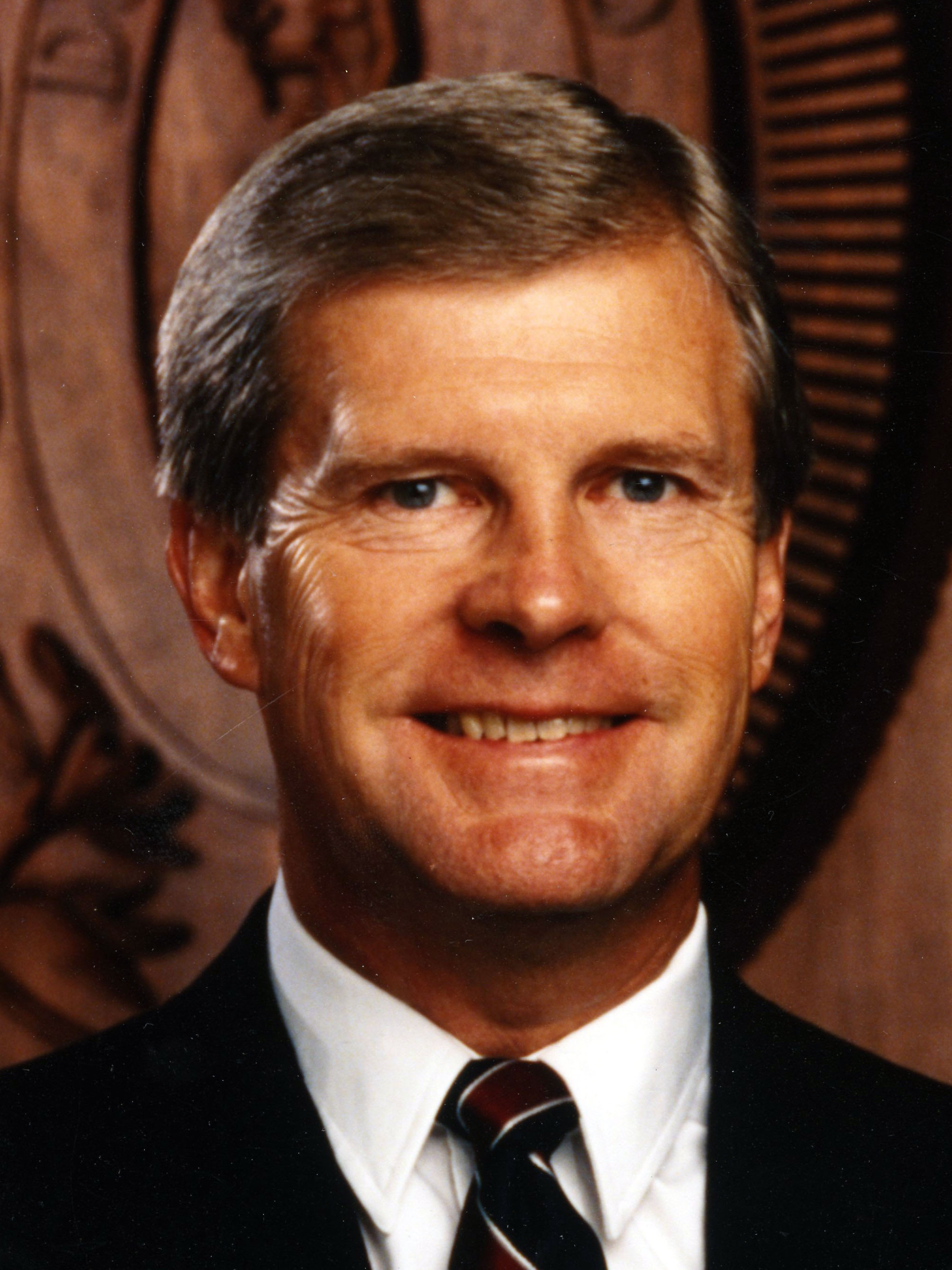
Former governor
Carroll Campbell
of South Carolina
(1987–1995)

Governor
John Engler
of Michigan
(1991–2003)

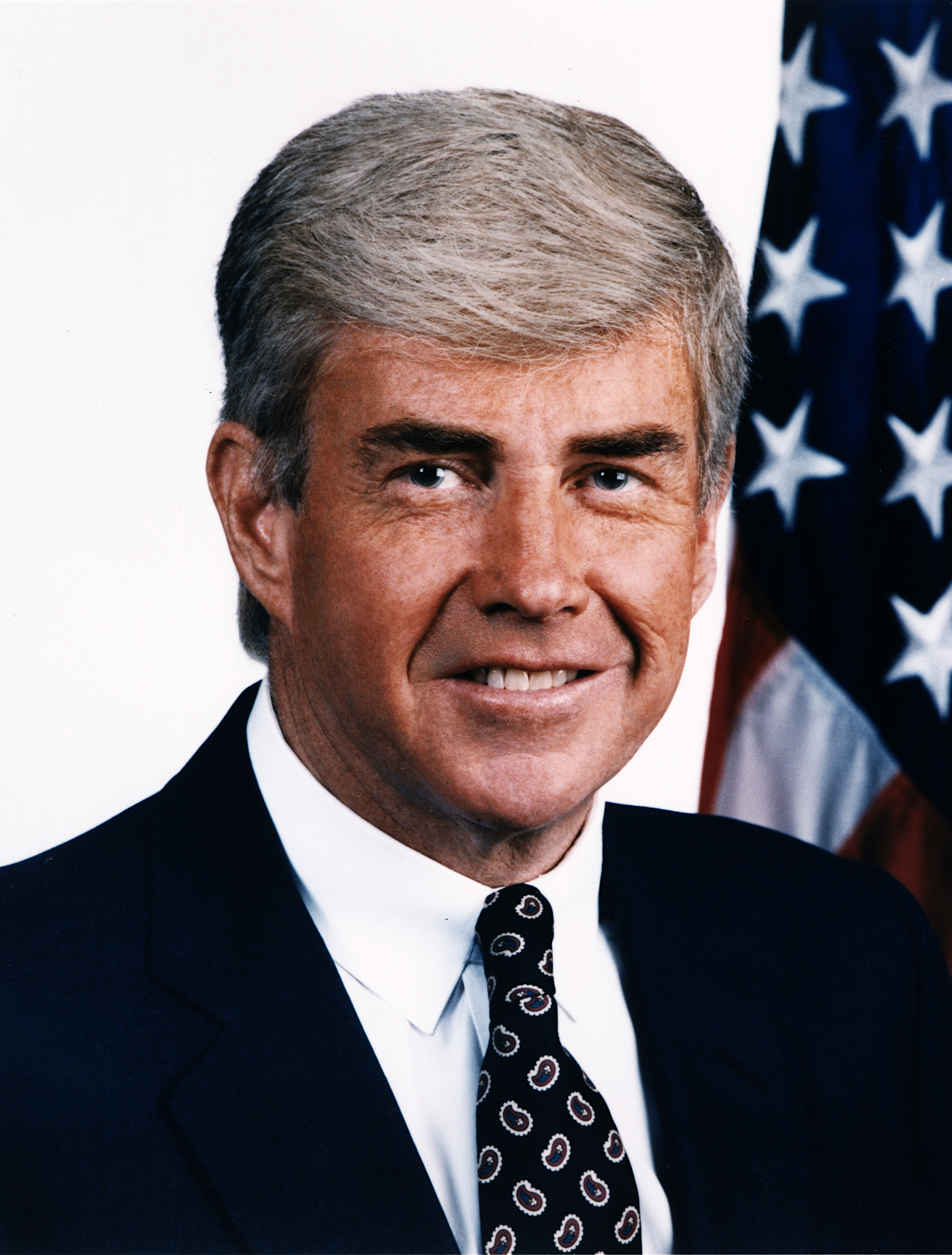
Former Secretary of Housing and Urban Development
Jack Kemp
from New York
(1989–1993)

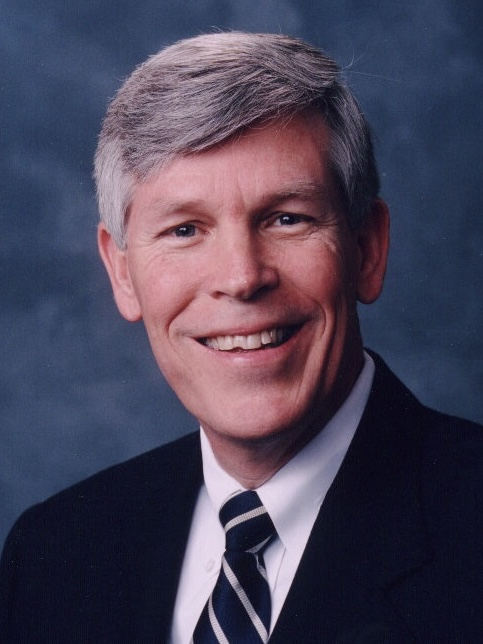
Senator
Connie Mack III
from Florida
(1989–2001)

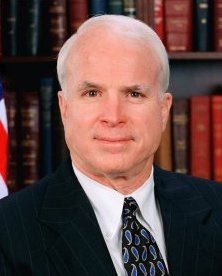
Senator
John McCain
from Arizona
(1987–2018)

== Other potential candidates ==
=== Members of Congress ===
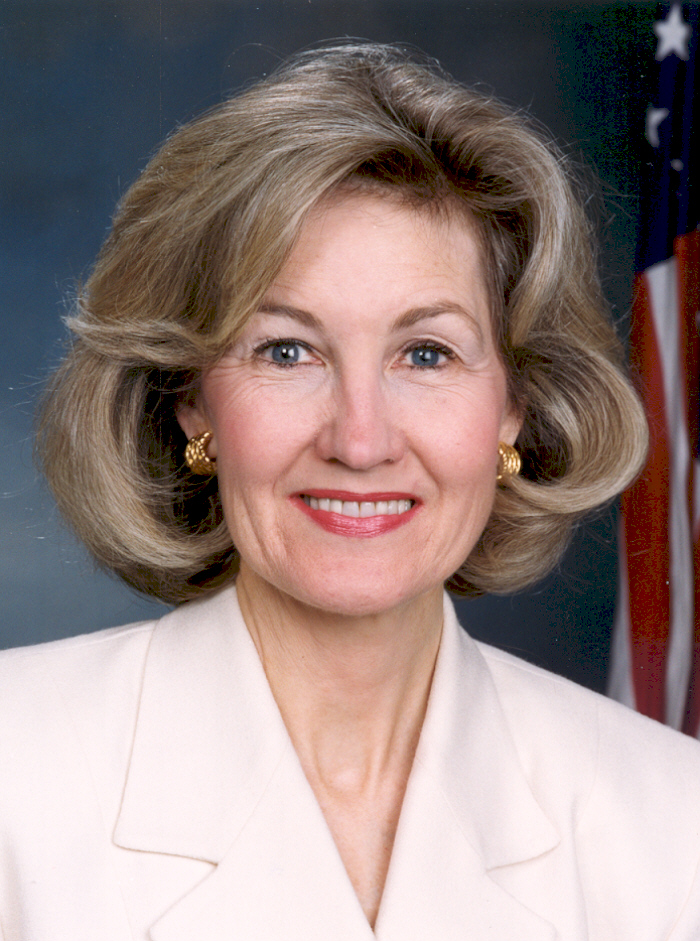
Senator
Kay Bailey Hutchison
from Texas
(1993–2013)

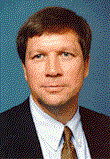
Representative
John Kasich
from Ohio
(1983–2001)

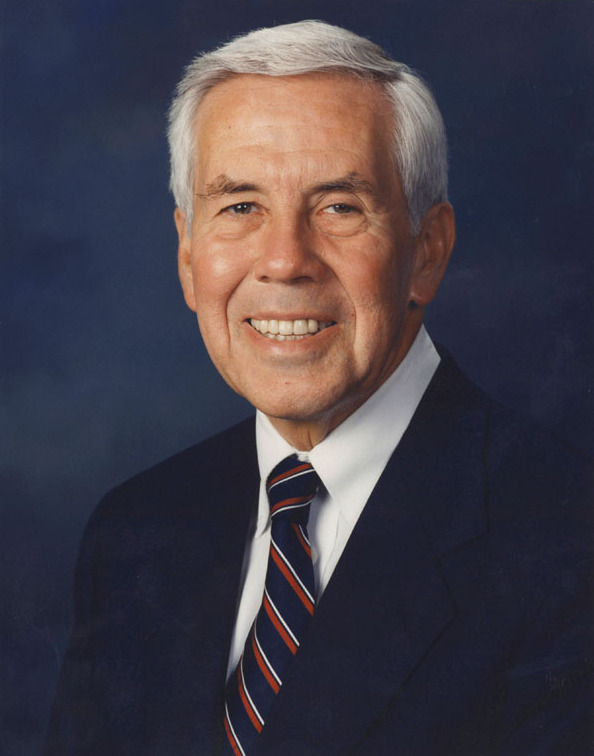
Senator and 1996 presidential candidate
Richard Lugar
from Indiana
(1977–2013)

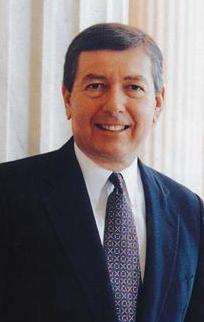
Senator
John Ashcroft
from Missouri
(1995–2001)

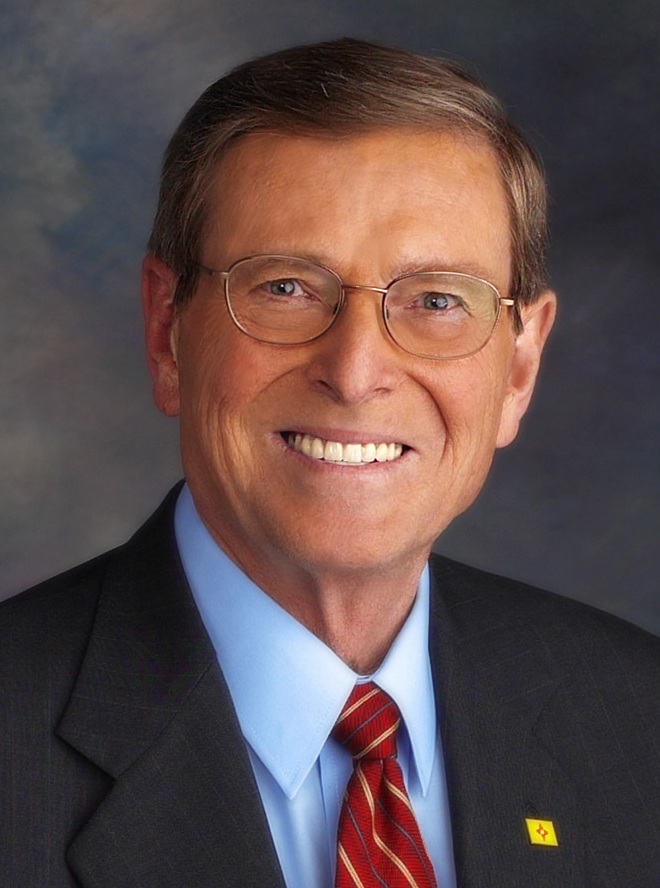
Senator
Pete Domenici
from New Mexico
(1973–2009)

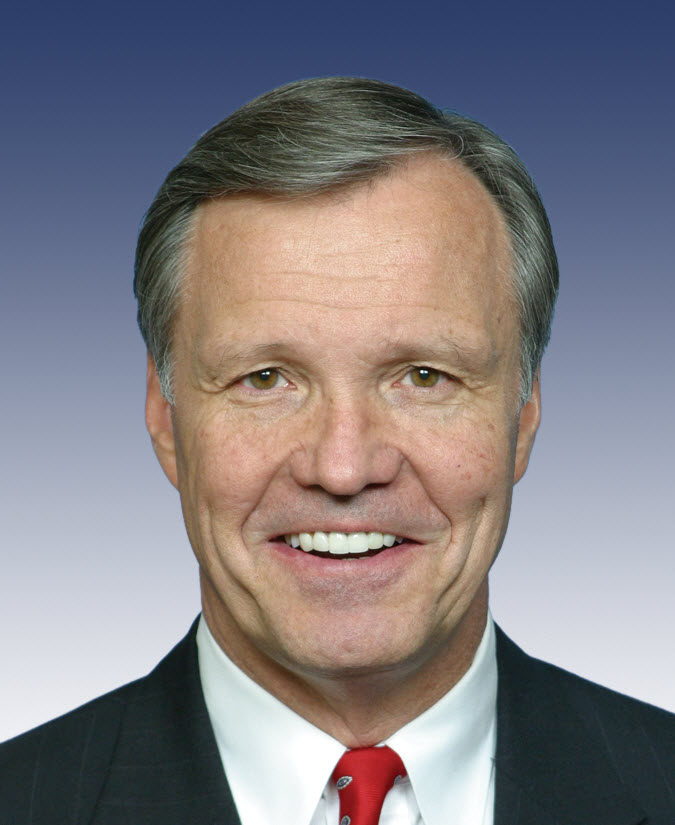
Representative
Christopher Cox
from California
(1989–2005)

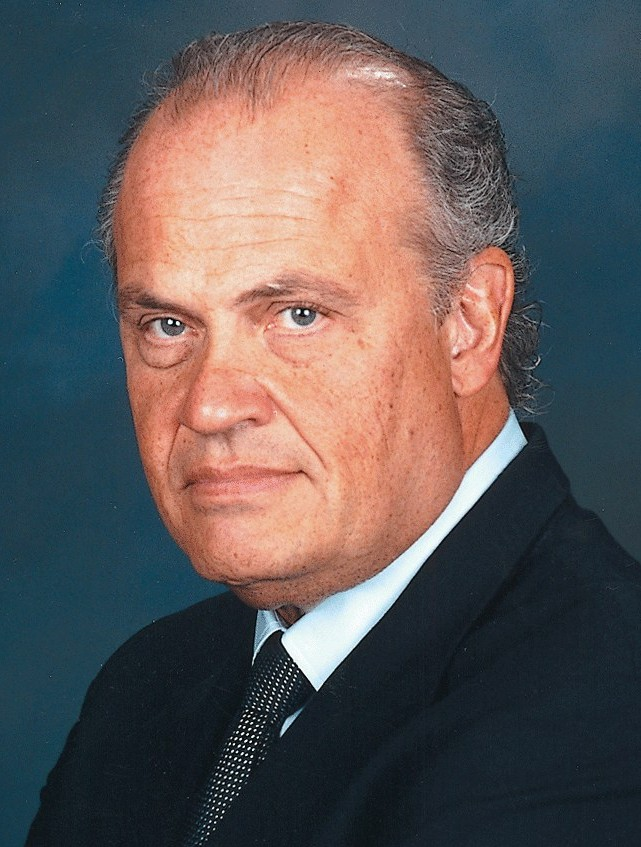
Senator
Fred Thompson
from Tennessee
(1994–2003)

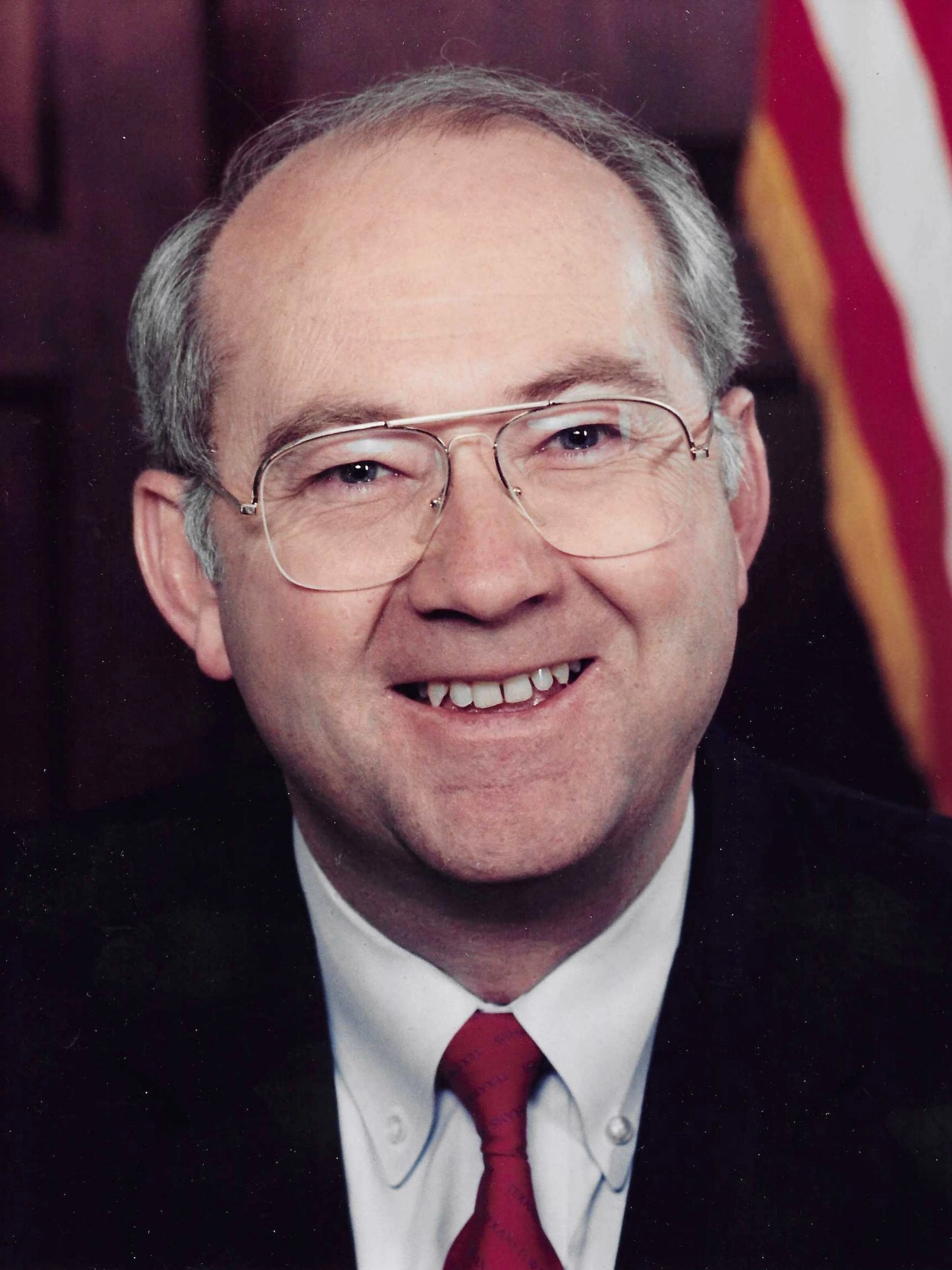
Senator and 1996 presidential candidate
Phil Gramm
from Texas
(1985–2002)

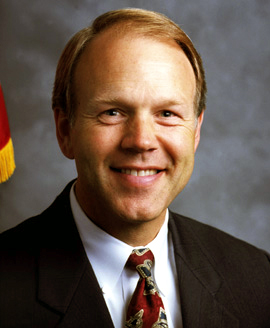
Senator
Don Nickles
from Oklahoma
(1981–2005)

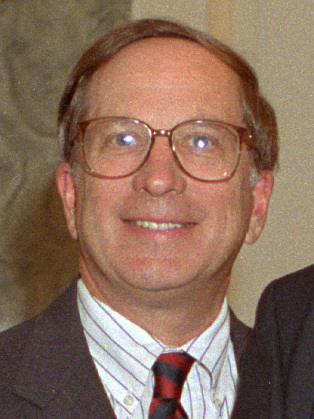
Democratic Senator
Sam Nunn
from Georgia
(1972–1997)

=== Governors ===
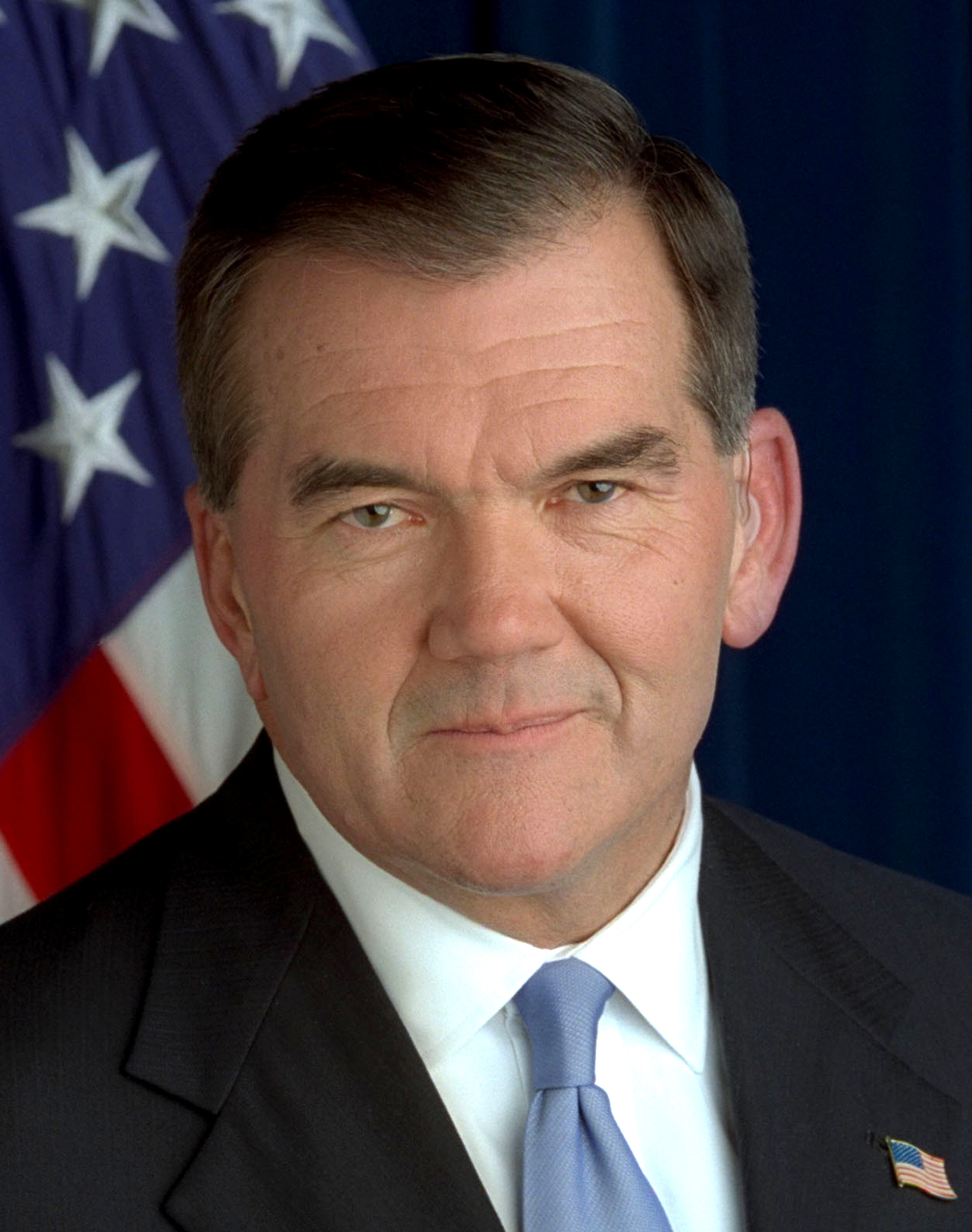
Tom Ridge
of Pennsylvania
(1995–2001)

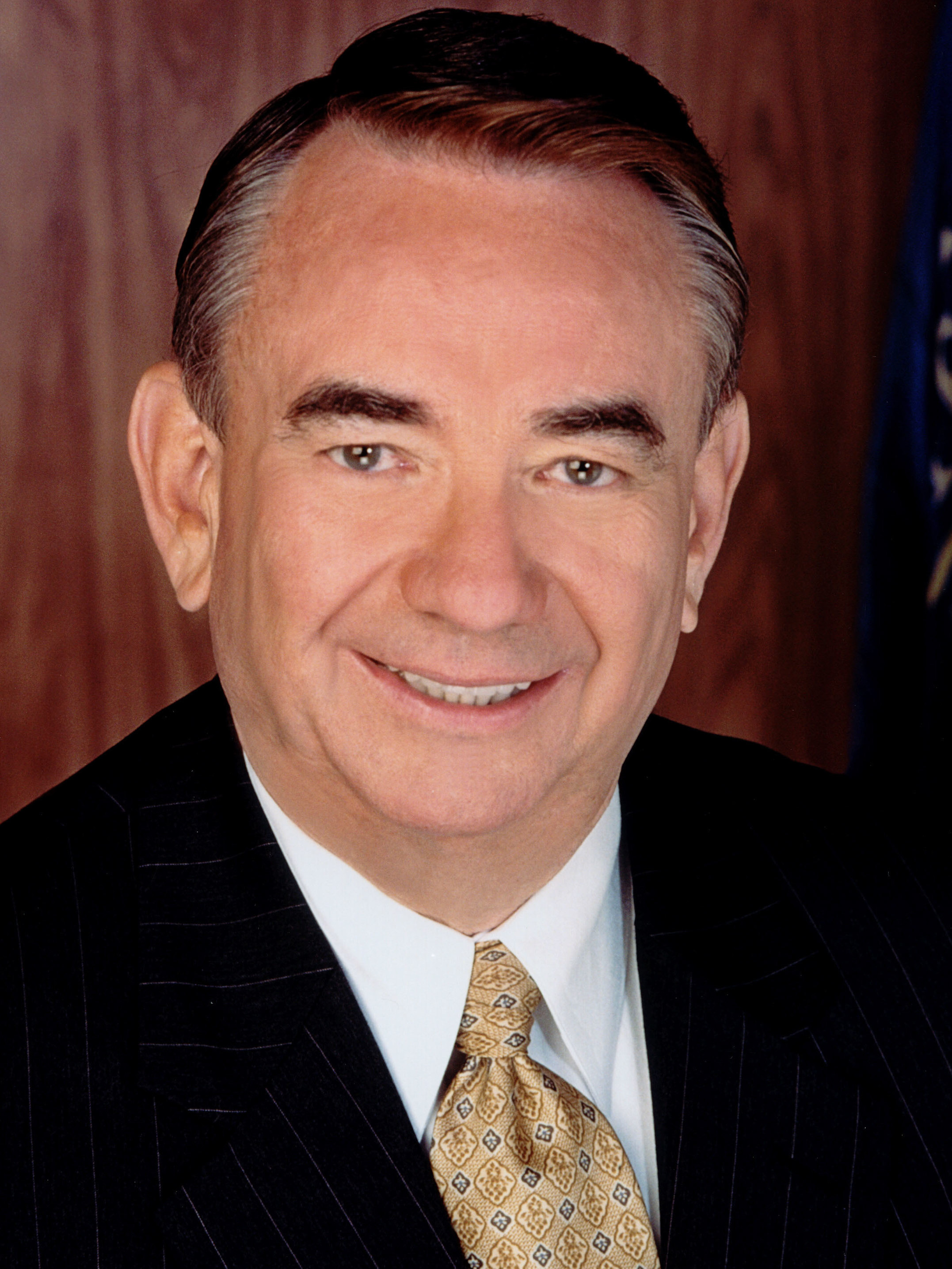
Tommy Thompson
of Wisconsin
(1987–2001)

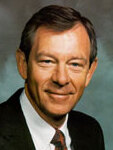
George Voinovich
of Ohio
(1991–1998)

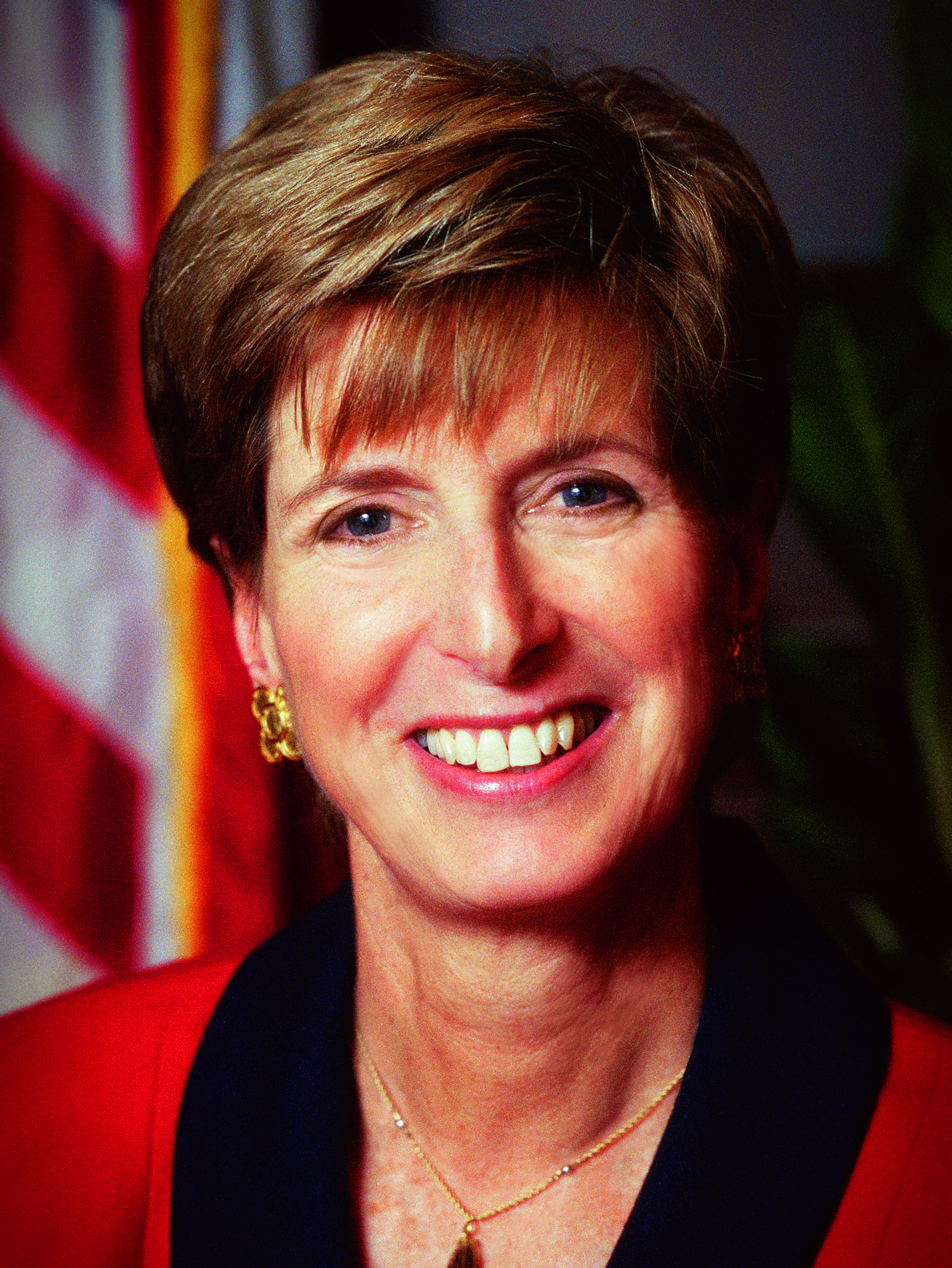
Christine Todd Whitman
of New Jersey
(1994–2001)

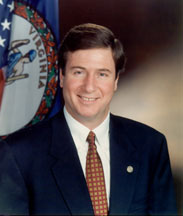
George Allen
of Virginia
(1994–1998)

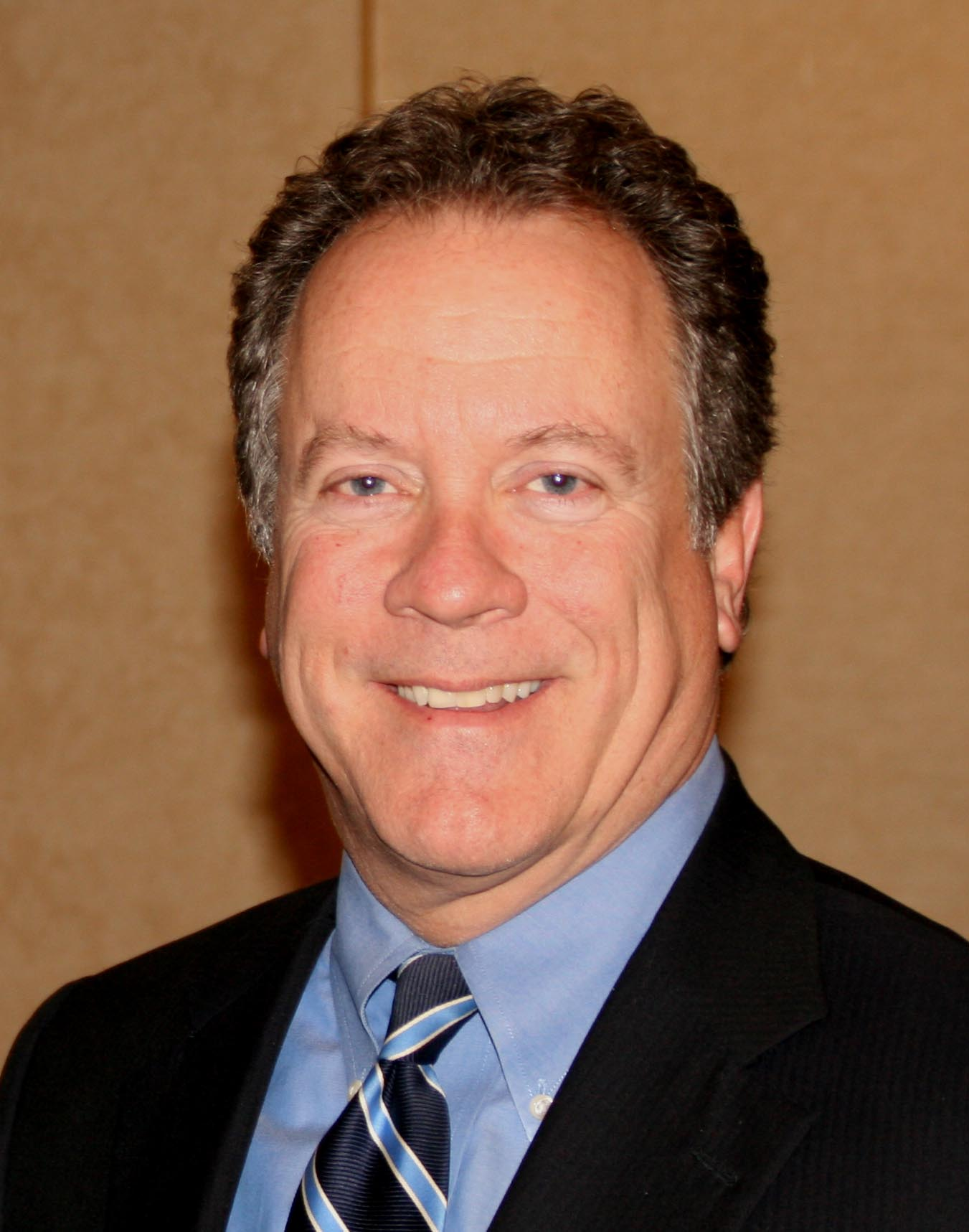
David Beasley
of South Carolina
(1995–1999)

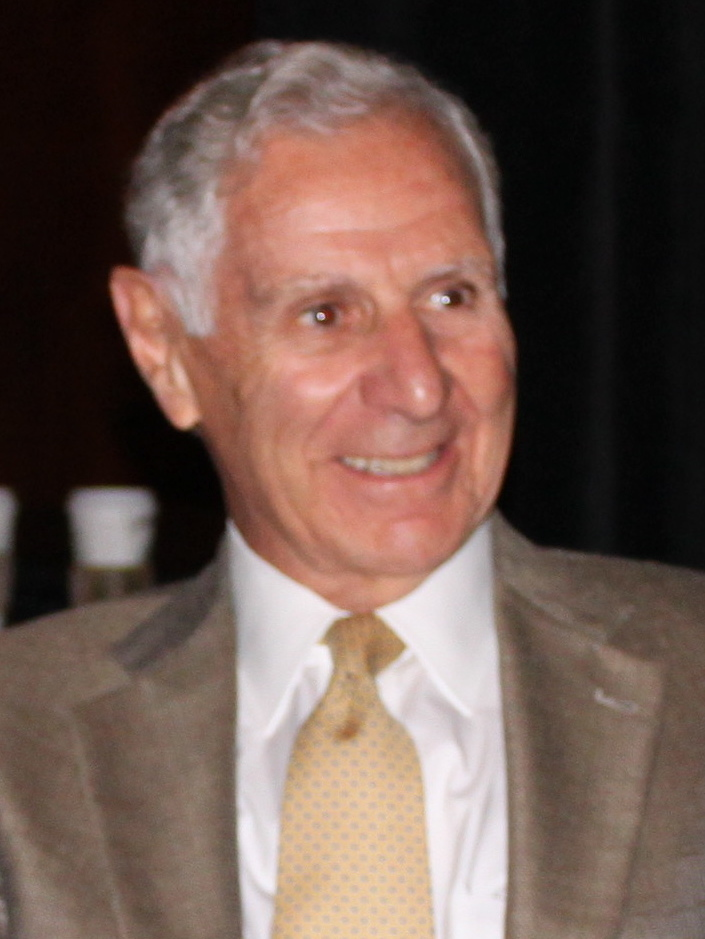
George Deukmejian
of California
(1983–1991)

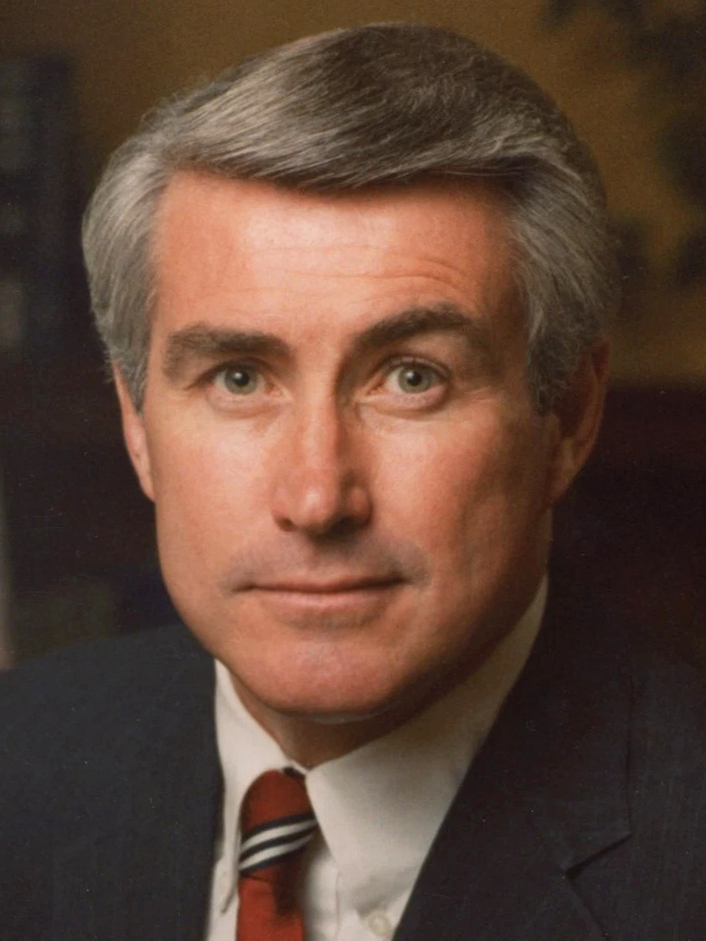
Jim Edgar
of Illinois
(1991–1999)

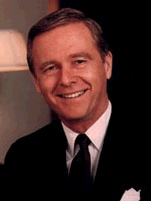
Pete Wilson
of California, a 1996 presidential candidate
(1991–1999)

Federal executive branch officials

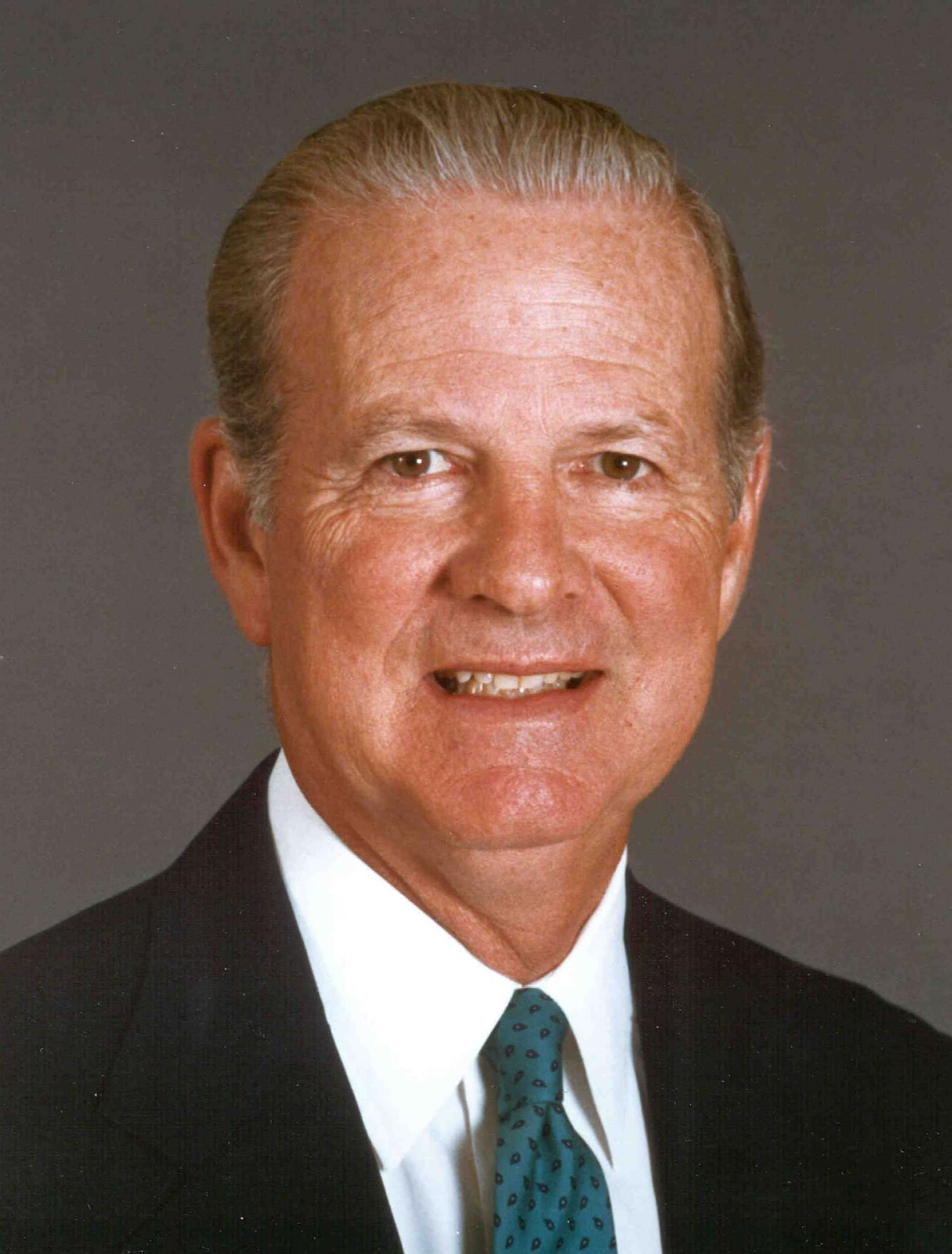
Former Secretary of State
James Baker
(1989–1992)

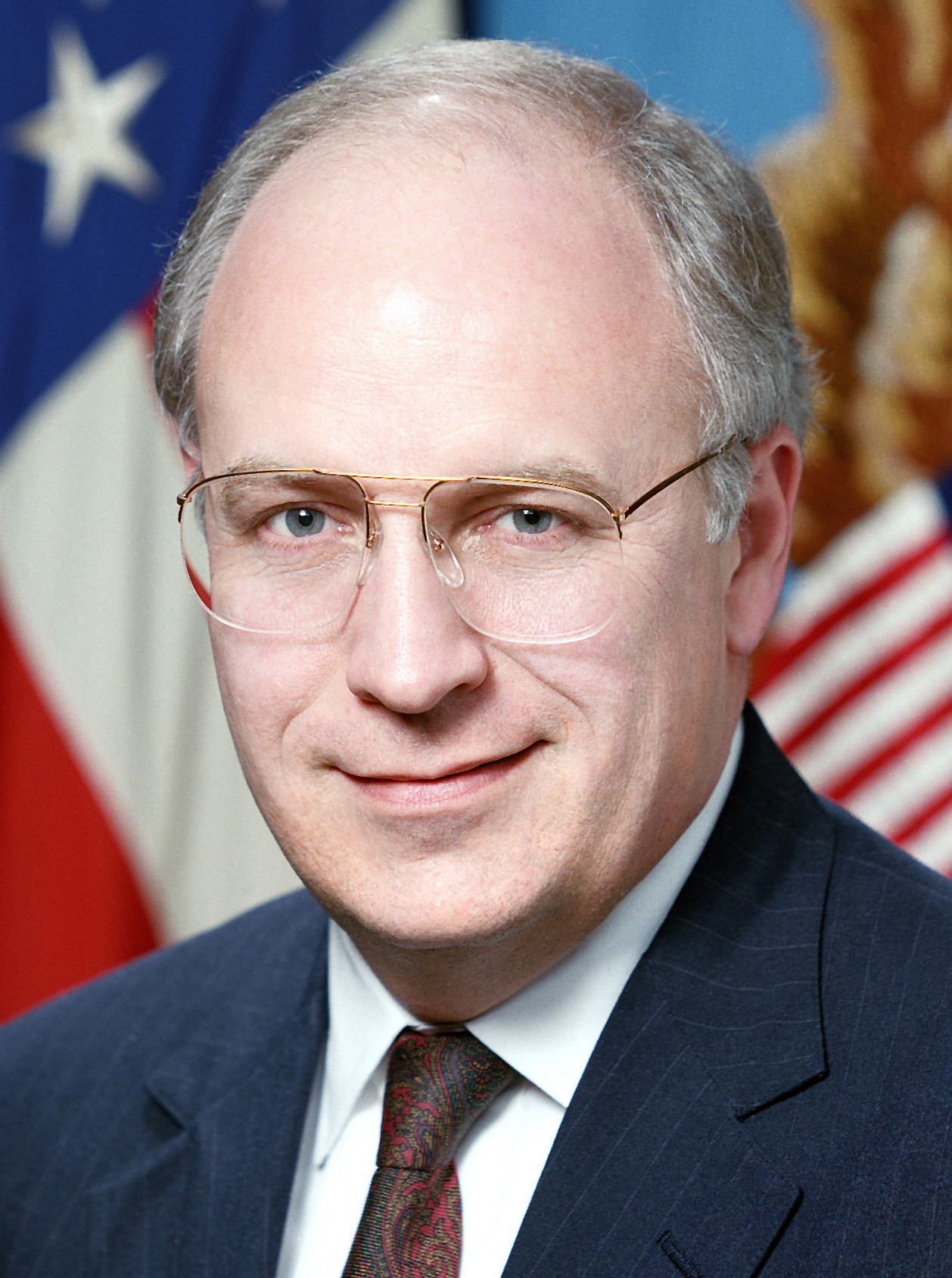
Former Secretary of Defense
Dick Cheney
from Wyoming
(1989–1993)

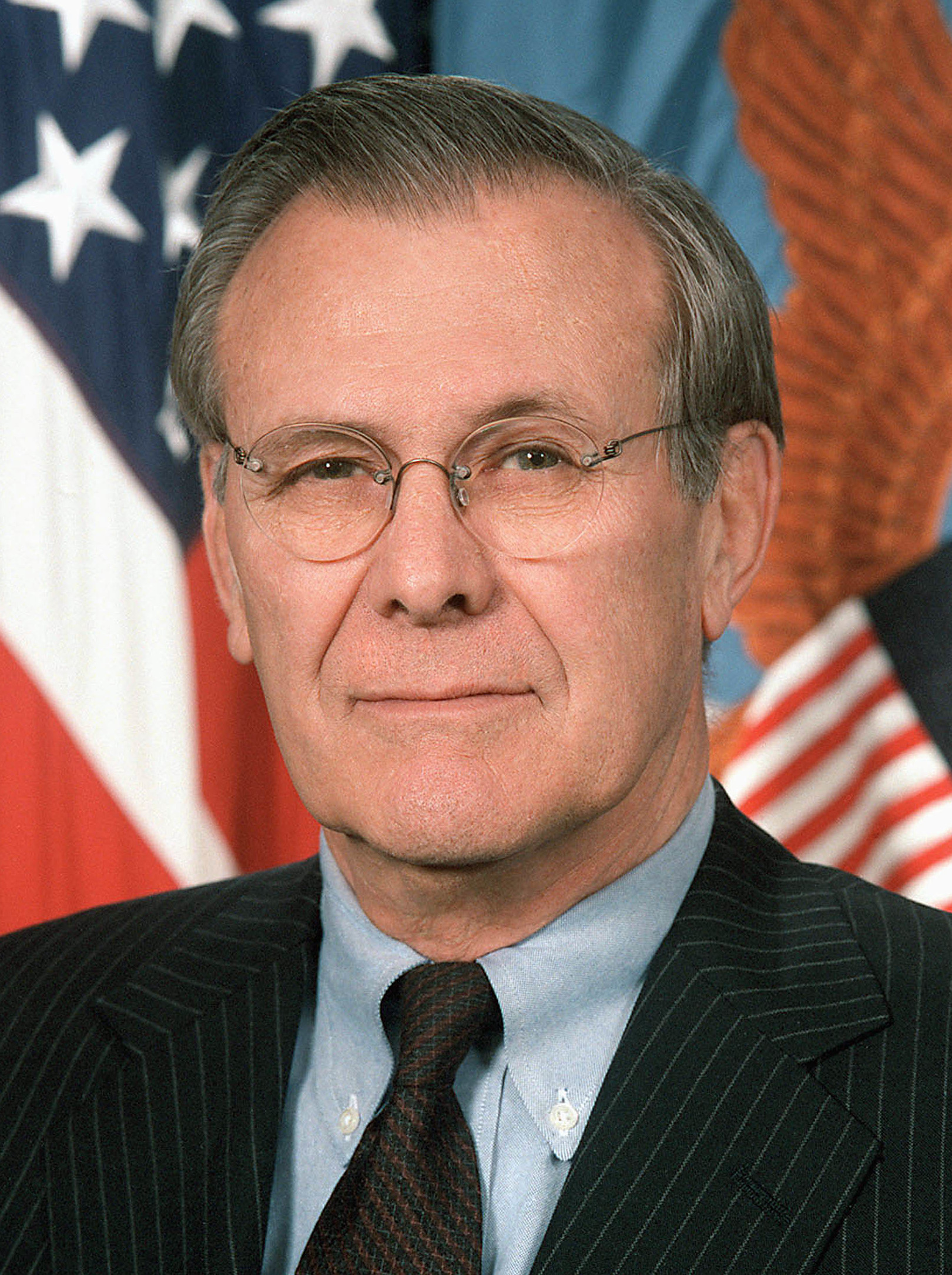
Former Secretary of Defense
Donald Rumsfeld
from Illinois
(1975–1977)

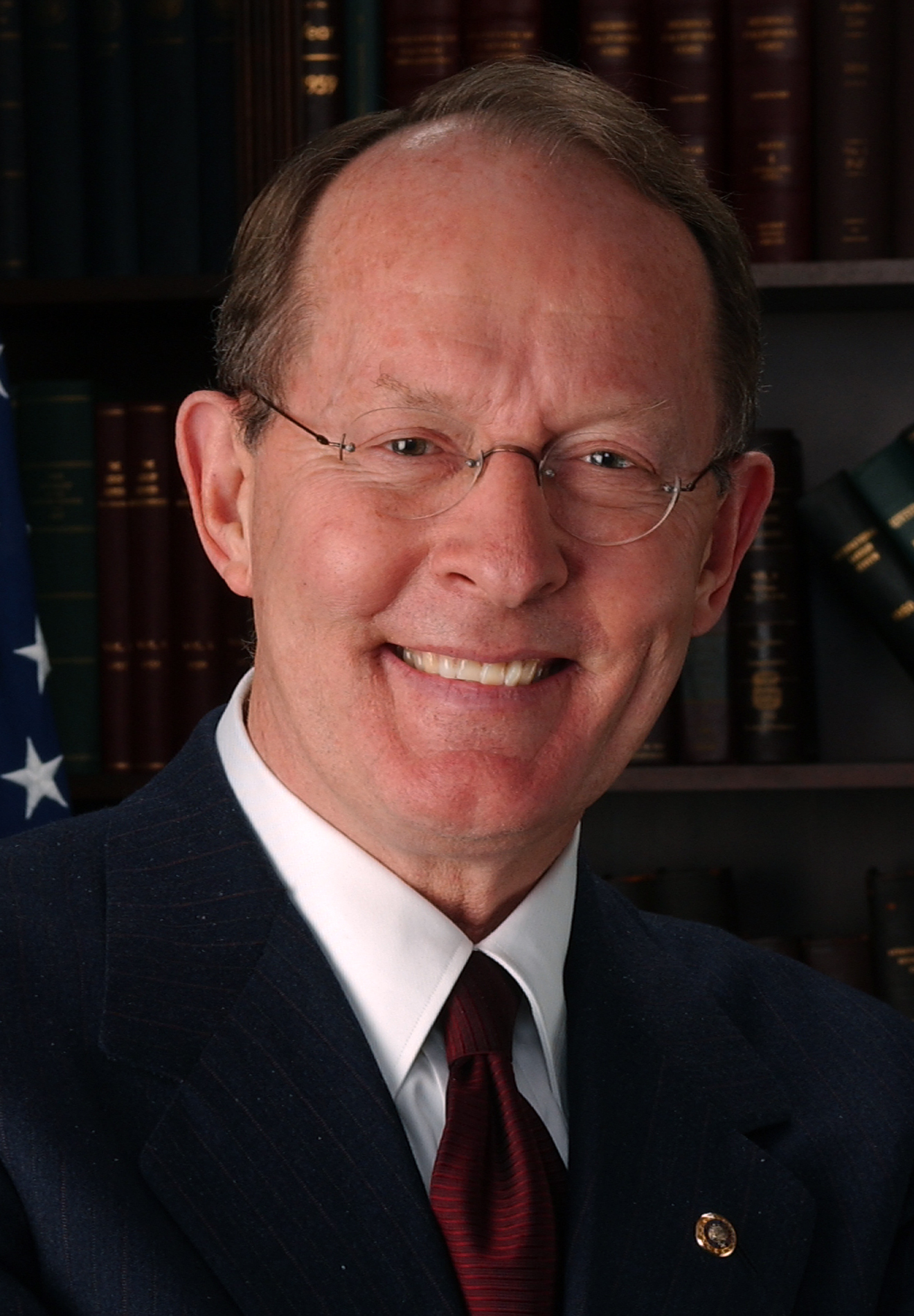
Former Secretary of Education and 1996 presidential candidate
Lamar Alexander
from Tennessee
(1991–1993)

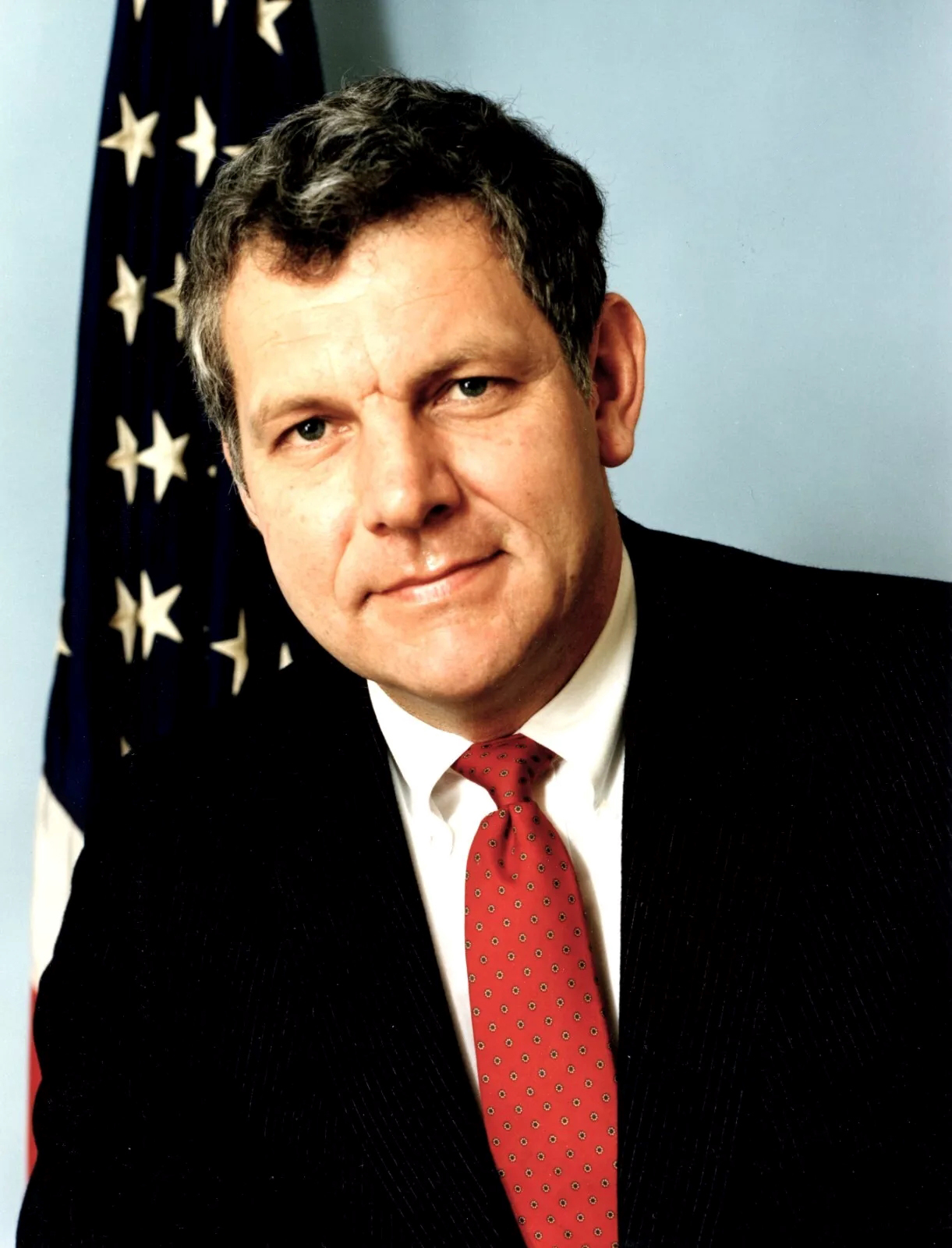
Former Secretary of Education
William Bennett
from Texas
(1985–1988)

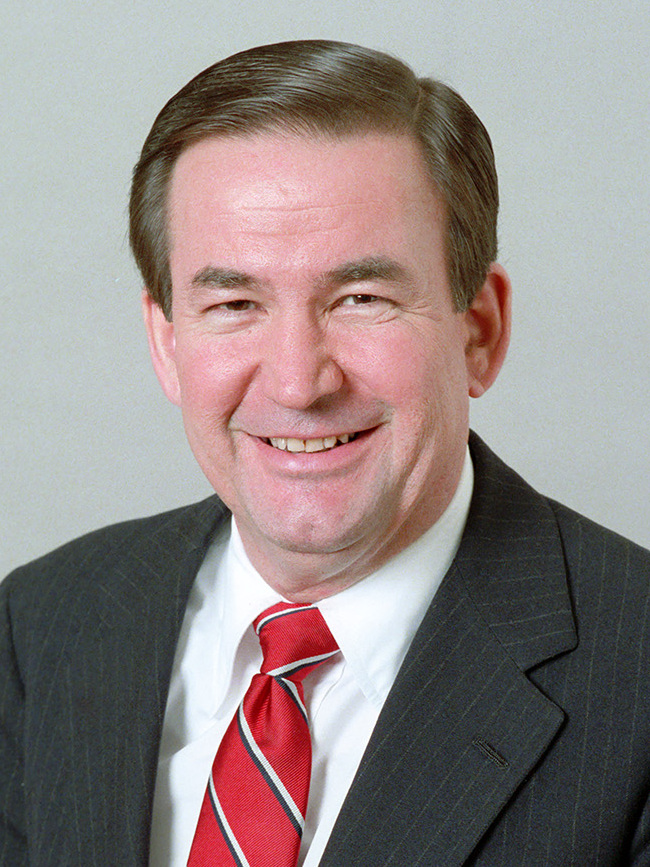
Former White House Communications Director and 1996 presidential candidate
Pat Buchanan
from Virginia
(1985–1987)

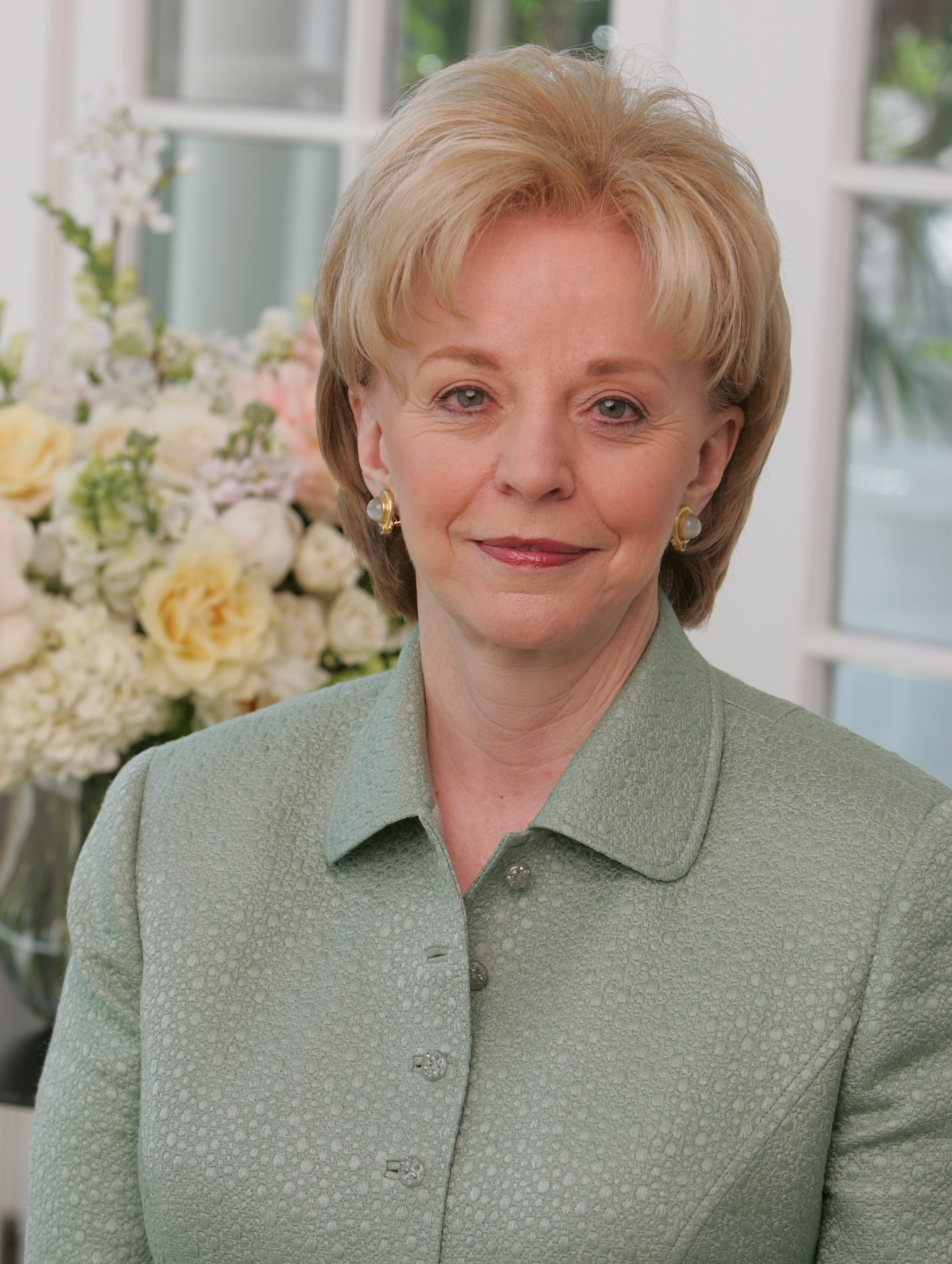
Former Chair of the National Endowment for the Humanities
Lynne Cheney
from Wyoming
(1986–1993)

=== Other Individuals ===
Attorney General of California
Dan Lungren
from California
(1991–1999)

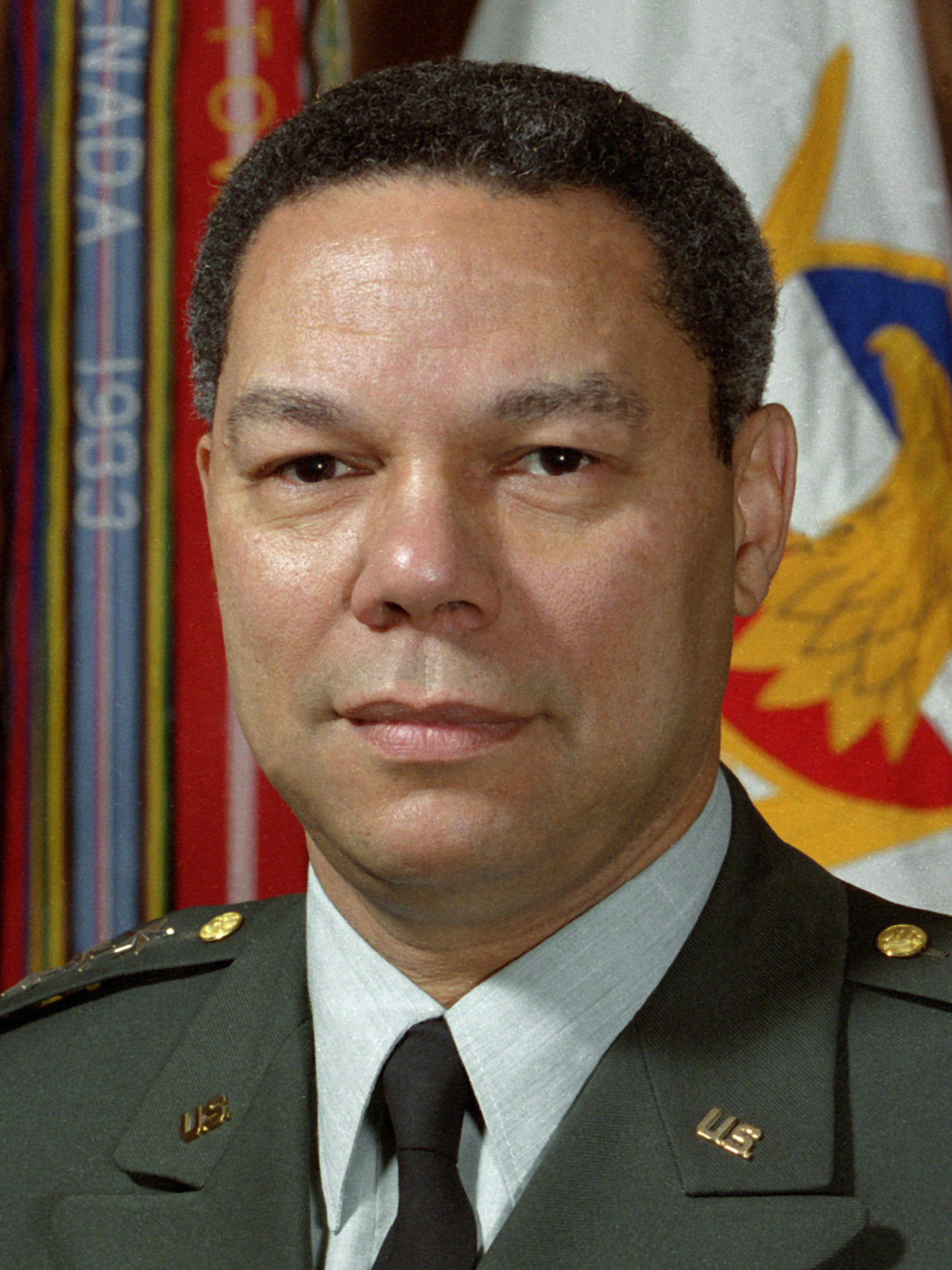
Former chairman of the Joint Chiefs of Staff
Colin Powell
from New York
(1989–1993)

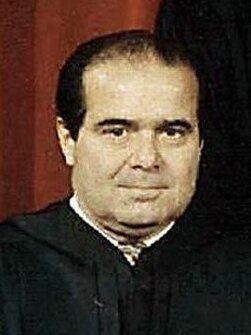
Associate Justice of the United States Supreme Court
Antonin Scalia
from New Jersey
(1986–2016)

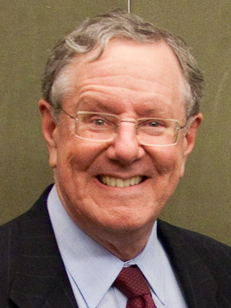
1996 presidential candidate
Steve Forbes
from New Jersey
(1985–1993)

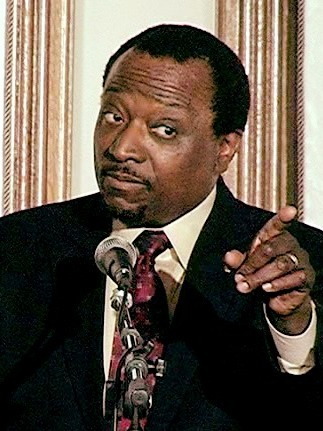
Commentator and 1996 presidential candidate
Alan Keyes
from Maryland

== See also ==
- Bob Dole 1996 presidential campaign
- 1996 Republican Party presidential primaries
- 1996 Republican National Convention
- 1996 United States presidential election
- List of United States major party presidential tickets
