= Bob Dole presidential campaign =

Bob Dole unsuccessfully ran for president three times:

- Bob Dole 1980 presidential campaign, the failed campaign Bob Dole conducted in 1980
- Bob Dole 1988 presidential campaign, the failed campaign Bob Dole conducted in 1988
- Bob Dole 1996 presidential campaign
