= Clinton presidential campaign =

Clinton presidential campaign may refer to:

- Bill Clinton 1992 presidential campaign, a successful election campaign resulting in his being elected the 42nd president of the United States
- Bill Clinton 1996 presidential campaign, a successful re-election campaign
- Hillary Clinton 2008 presidential campaign, an unsuccessful primary campaign for the Democratic nomination
- Hillary Clinton 2016 presidential campaign, an unsuccessful general election campaign
