= 1996 Democratic National Convention =

American political convention

- 1996 presidential election

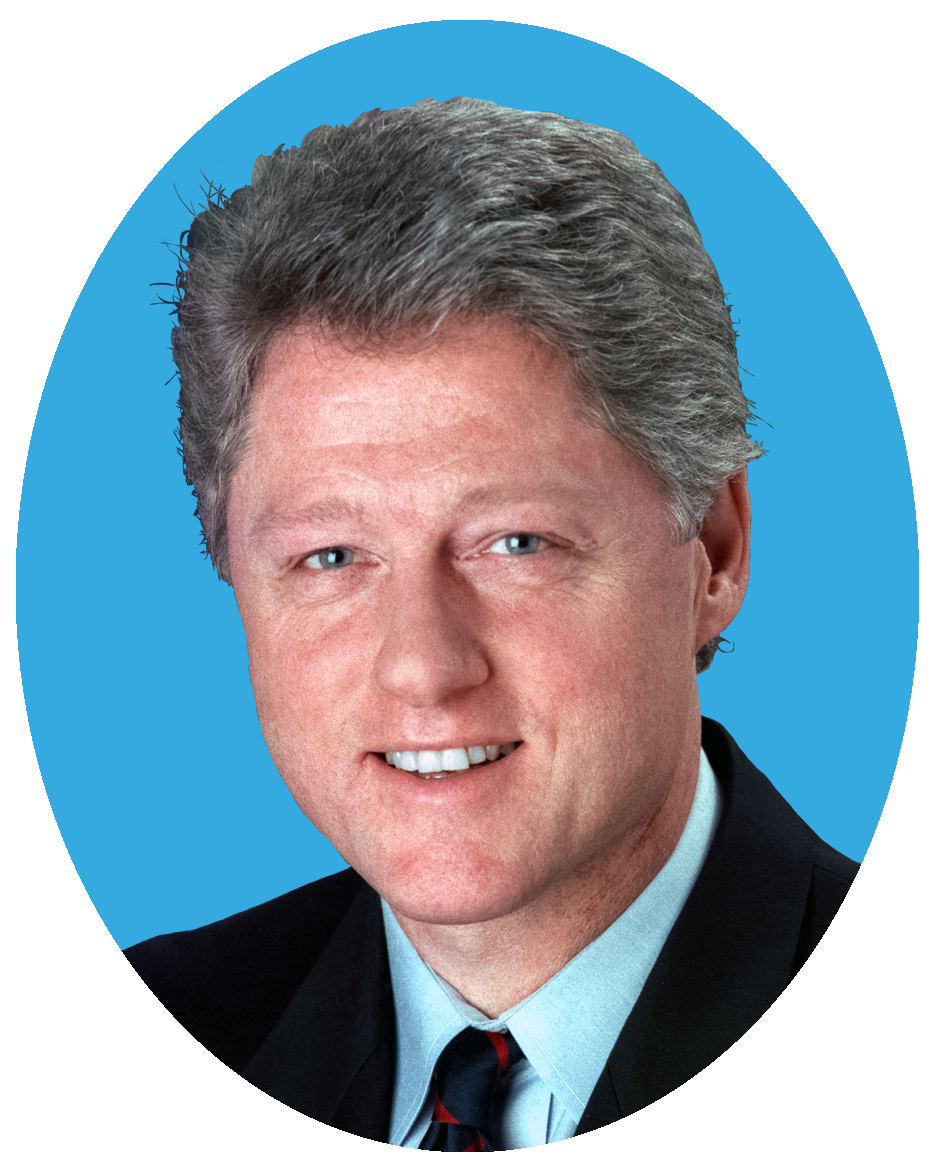
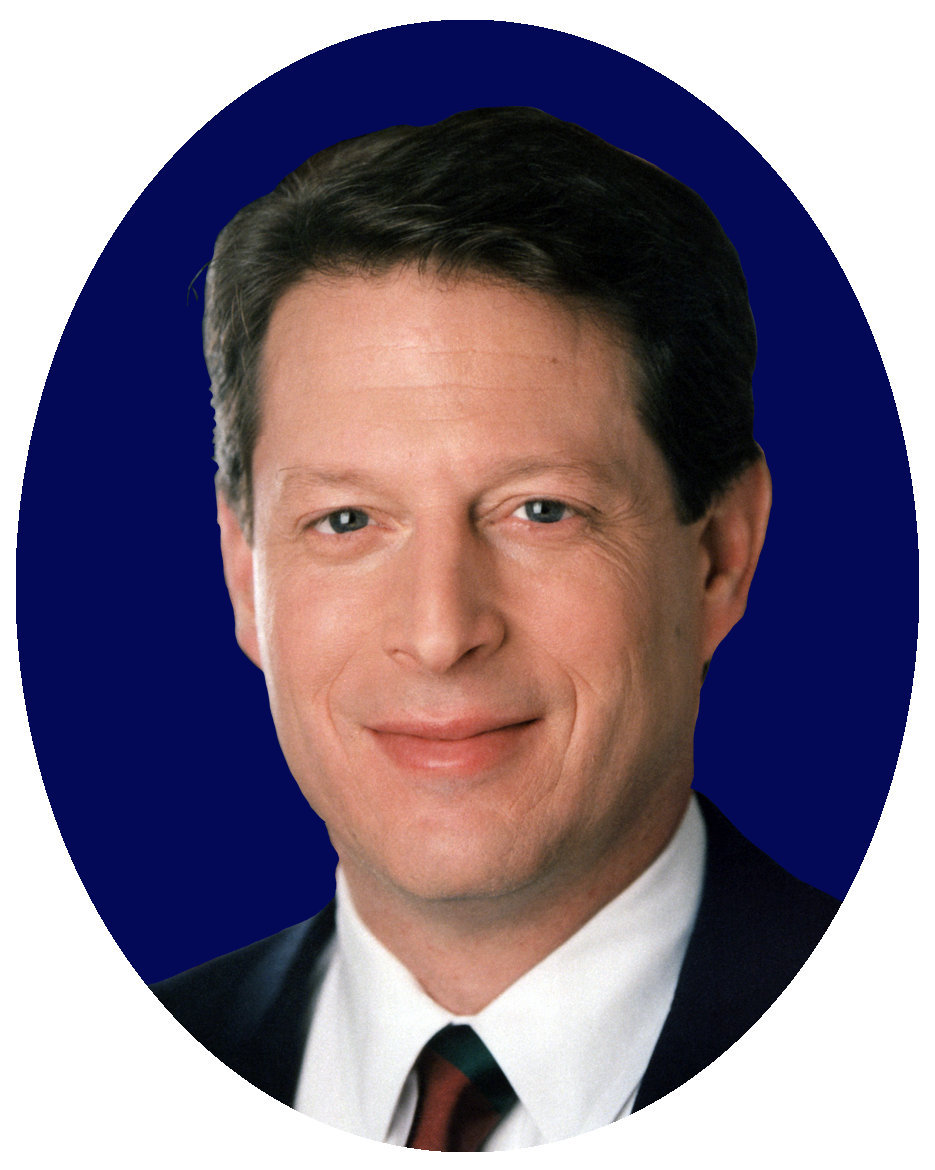
- Nominees; Clinton and Gore

Convention
- Dates: August 26–29, 1996
- City: Chicago, Illinois
- Venue: United Center
- Keynote speaker: Evan Bayh
- Notable speakers: Christopher Dodd; Mario Cuomo; Hillary Clinton; Christopher Reeve; Ted Kennedy

Candidates
- Presidential nominee: Bill Clinton of Arkansas
- Vice-presidential nominee: Al Gore of Tennessee

Voting
- Total delegates: 4,289
- Votes needed for nomination: 2,147
- Results (president): Clinton (AR): 4,277 (99.72%); Abstention: 12 (0.28%)
- Results (vice president): Gore (TN): 4,289 (100%)
- Ballots: 1

The 1996 Democratic National Convention was held at the United Center in Chicago, Illinois, from August 26 to August 29, 1996. President Bill Clinton and Vice President Al Gore were nominated for reelection. It was the first national convention of either party to be held in Chicago since the riots of the 1968 Democratic convention, and until 2024, was the most recent presidential convention held in the city by either major party.

== Site selection ==
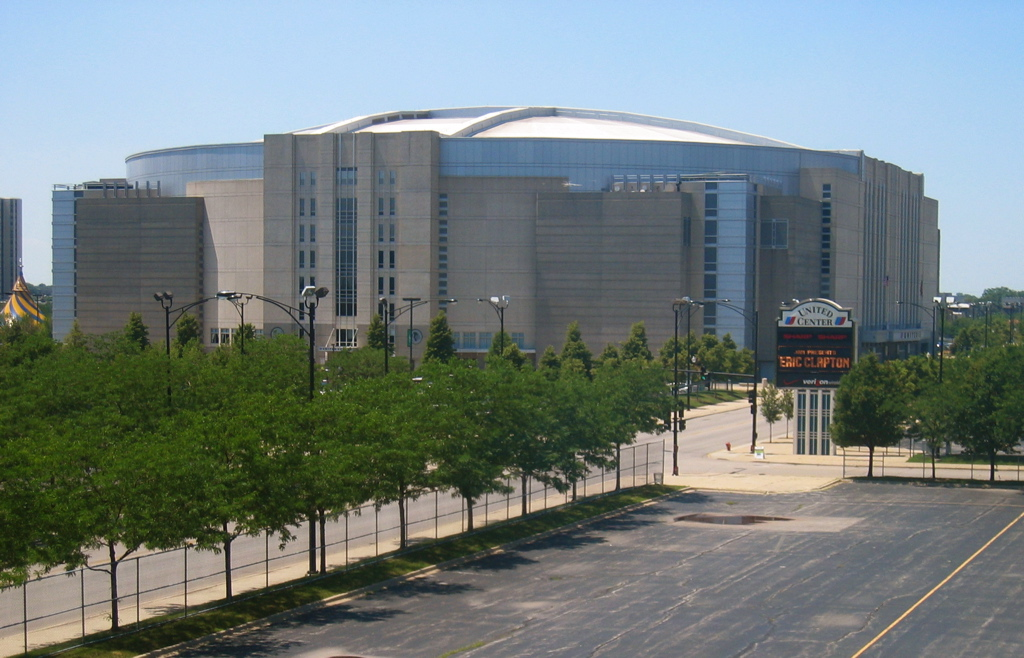
The United Center was the site of the 1996 Democratic National Convention. The center would host the Democratic National Convention again in 2024.

Chicago, Kansas City, Los Angeles, New Orleans, New York, and San Antonio were originally considered as possible host cities. Los Angeles withdrew its bid after the 1994 Northridge earthquake. Kansas City would also withdraw.

On August 4, 1994, it was announced that Chicago had beaten out the other finalist, San Antonio, for the right to host the convention. This would mark the first time that Chicago hosted a major presidential year political convention since the violent 1968 Democratic National Convention, and the first time a political convention was held in the United Center, which had been recently completed.

During the bidding for the convention, Chicago was seen as a frontrunner. One dynamic in Chicago's favor was that chairman of the Democratic National Committee David Wilhelm had strong connections to the city. Also seen as helpful to Chicago's odds was the goodwill that Chicago Mayor Richard M. Daley had earned with President Clinton by helping to lobby Chicago-area congressmen to support the North American Free Trade Agreement. The fact that First Lady Hillary Clinton was raised in the Chicago suburbs was seen as helpful. Bill Clinton's close relationship with Mayor Daley's brother William M. Daley and Clinton's appreciation of Mayor Daley's endorsement of him during the 1992 Democratic Party presidential primaries were also seen as aiding Chicago's chances. Additionally, heading into 1996, Illinois was projected to be a key "battleground state".

Of the bid cities, Chicago's proposed the largest funding package, proposing that its host committee would raise $32 million for the convention.

This was the 25th major party convention to be held in Chicago. Chicago has held more major party conventions than any other city.

=== Bids ===
Bid cities
City	Venue	Previous major party conventions hosted by city
Chicago, Illinois	United Center	Democratic: 1864, 1884, 1892, 1896, 1932, 1940, 1944, 1952, 1956, 1968; Republican: 1860, 1868, 1880, 1884, 1888, 1904, 1908, 1912, 1916, 1920, 1932, 1944, 1952, 1960
New York City, New York	Madison Square Garden	Democratic: 1868, 1924, 1976, 1980, 1992
New Orleans, Louisiana	Louisiana Superdome	Republican: 1988
San Antonio, Texas	Alamodome	—N/a
Kansas City, Missouri (withdrew bid)		Democratic: 1900; Republican: 1928, 1976
Los Angeles, California (withdrew bid)	Los Angeles Convention Center	Democratic: 1960

== Preparations and logistics ==
Ahead of the convention, in order to project a positive image of the city, Mayor Daley dedicated a large amount funding towards planting new trees and decorative potted flowers throughout the West Loop area in which the convention would be held as well as in the city's downtown. The convention came at a time when changes and beautification were underway in the West Loop, including the repaving of roads, the addition of decorative planters, and the installation of ornate street lamps. The Madison Street overpass above the Kennedy Expressway was decorated with red white and blue stars. Greektown underwent a streetscape enhancement project. In the weeks ahead of the convention, a demolition project on five buildings of the Henry Horner Homes near the venue was completed. City officials claime that the timing of some of the enhancements to the West Loop was coincidental. Temporary decorations were also added, including stickers advertising the convention on 2,000 street signs.

A temporary convention-oriented bus route was established between the United Center and locations in The Loop. Events related to the convention were held in venues throughout Chicago in order to showcase the city. Hundreds of events related to the convention were held.

The convention introduced a new style four-screen speech prompting system for speakers consisting of two glass teleprompters, accompanied by an inset lectern monitor, and for the first time, a large under-camera confidence monitor.

President Clinton traveled to the convention aboard the "21st Century Express", a whistle-stop train tour evoking the similar campaigns of past decades. During the four-day journey from Washington, D.C., to Chicago, Clinton gave campaign speeches at several stops in West Virginia, Kentucky, Ohio, Michigan, and Indiana.

== Notable speakers ==
The convention's keynote speaker was Governor Evan Bayh of Indiana. The nomination speech was given by Senator Christopher Dodd of Connecticut. Other notable speakers included former New York governor Mario Cuomo, First Lady of the United States Hillary Rodham Clinton, actor Christopher Reeve, House Minority Leader Dick Gephardt, Senate Minority Leader Tom Daschle, and other Senators Russ Feingold of Wisconsin, and John Kerry and Ted Kennedy of Massachusetts.

With Clinton's wife, Hillary, speaking at the Democratic convention, and his opponent Bob Dole's wife Elizabeth Dole having spoken at the Republican convention, 1996 became the year in which it became established practice that both major party candidates spouses speak at their party's convention.

== Clinton's renomination speech ==
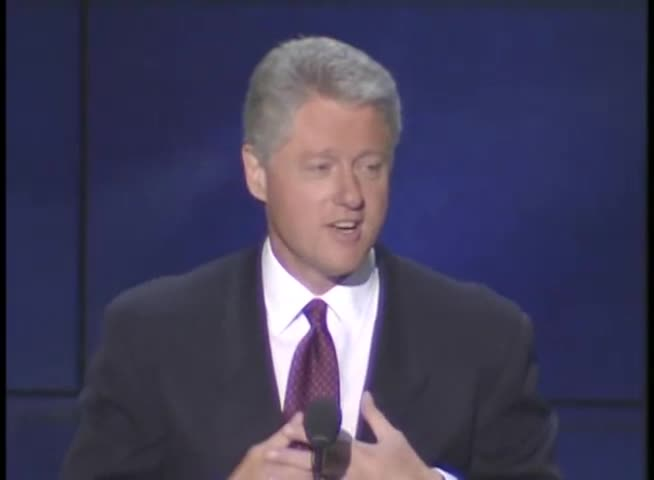
Bill Clinton delivering his renomination speech

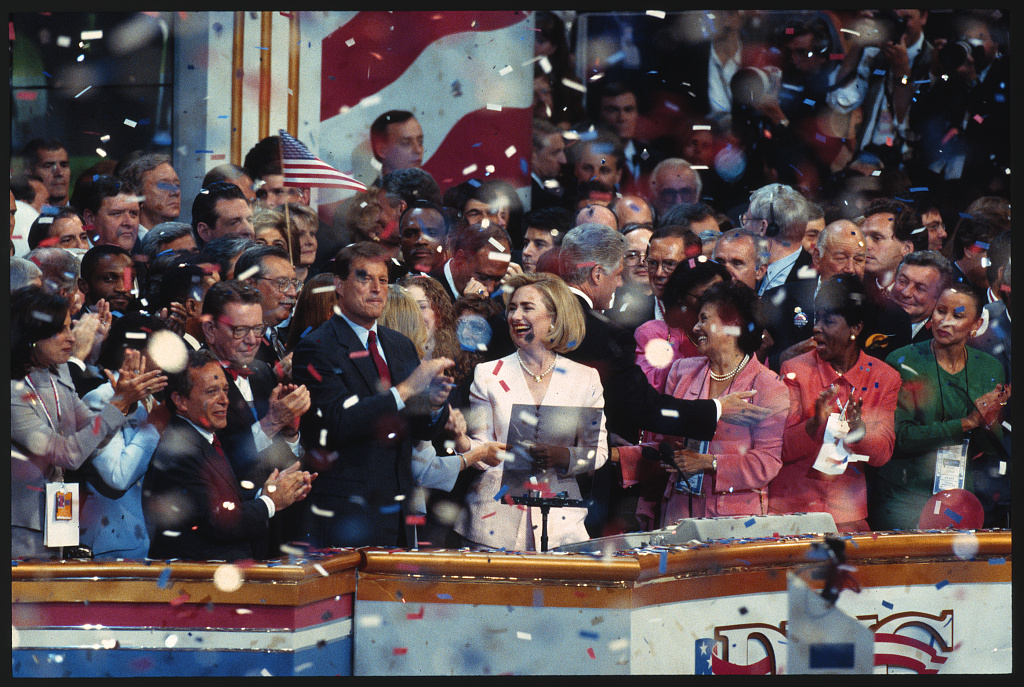
President Bill Clinton, Hillary Clinton, Vice President Al Gore, Senator Paul Simon and others on stage celebrating the renomination of Bill Clinton as the Democratic Party candidate for president

Clinton's speech on August 29 included his vision for the next decade, included tax cuts for the middle-class, 20 million more jobs, a strong defense with cuts in the military, but a strong presence of peacemaking troops, new military weapons and tanks, welfare reform goals for states and communities, and a peaceful transition for the Middle East.

== Refusal of delegates to Lyndon LaRouche ==
Lyndon LaRouche had run for president through multiple parties over multiple election cycles. In 1996, he ran for the nomination of the Democratic party, despite the Chair of the Democratic National Party ruling that Lyndon LaRouche "is not to be considered a qualified candidate for nomination of the Democratic Party for President" before the primaries began. In subsequent primaries LaRouche received enough votes in Louisiana and Virginia to get one delegate from each state. When the state parties refused to award the delegates, LaRouche sued in federal court, claiming a violation of the Voting Rights Act. After losing in the district court, the case was appealed to the U.S. Court of Appeals for the First Circuit, which sustained the lower court.

== Voting ==
Clinton was nominated unanimously for a second term and Vice President Al Gore by voice vote.

The Balloting:

Candidates	
Name	William J. Clinton
Certified Votes	4,277 (99.72%)
Abstentions	12 (0.28%)
total:	4,337

Clinton and Gore went on to defeat Bob Dole and Jack Kemp in the November general election in an Electoral College landslide with a substantial popular vote margin.

== Notable events ==
On August 28, Civil Rights Movement historian Randy Kryn and 10 others were arrested by the Federal Protective Service while doing a demonstration.

In the middle of the convention, many of the delegates danced to the song "Macarena". Al Gore famously danced to the song while standing still.

The original Broadway cast of Rent performed "Seasons of Love" at the end of the convention.

Taste of Chicago, a group of restaurants who have an annual street festival, catered the press area.

== Reception ==
Chicago's performance as a convention host city was regarded to have been successful.

== See also ==
- 1996 Republican National Convention
- Bill Clinton 1996 presidential campaign
- 1996 Democratic Party presidential primaries
- 1996 United States presidential election
- History of the United States Democratic Party
- List of Democratic National Conventions
- United States presidential nominating convention

Preceded by 1992; New York, New York	Democratic National Conventions	Succeeded by 2000; Los Angeles, California
