= Bob Dole 1996 presidential campaign =

Political campaign for United States presidency

Bob Dole for President 1996
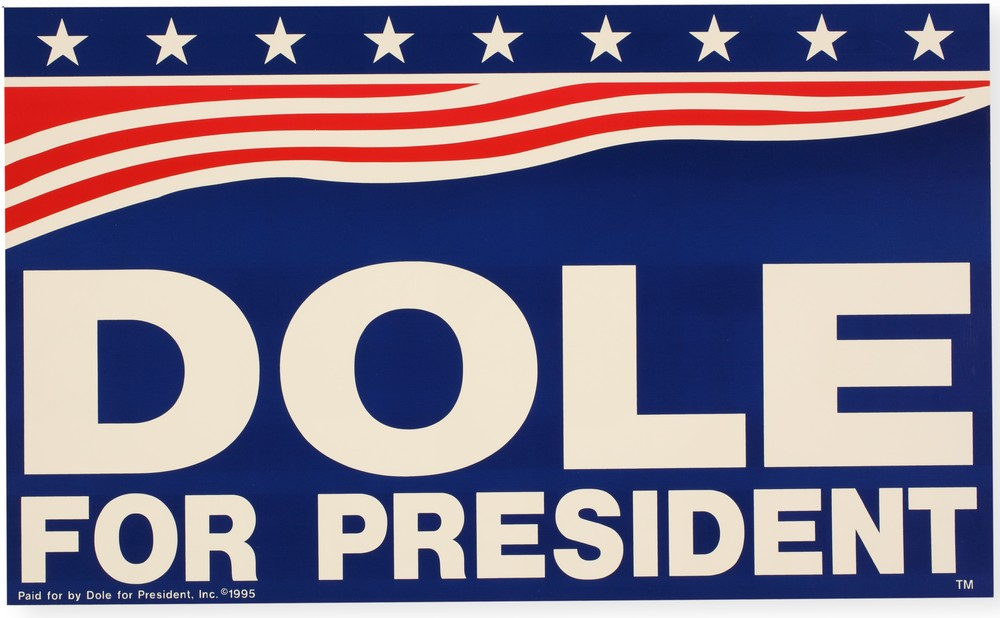
- Campaign: 1996 Republican primaries 1996 U.S. presidential election
- Candidate: Bob Dole; Senator from Kansas (1969–1996); Senate Majority Leader (1985–1987, 1995–1996); Jack Kemp; 9th U.S. Secretary of Housing and Urban Development (1989–1993)
- Affiliation: Republican Party
- Status: Announced: April 10, 1995; Presumptive nominee: March 19, 1996; Official nominee: August 15, 1996; Lost election: November 5, 1996
- Key people: Scott Reed (campaign manager)
- Slogan(s): Bob Dole. A Better Man. For a Better America. The Better Man for a Better America

Website
- http://www.dolekemp96.org/

The 1996 presidential campaign of Bob Dole began when the-then Republican Senator and Senate Majority Leader formally announced his candidacy for Republican Party nomination in 1995. After beating other candidates in the primaries, he became the Republican nominee, with his opponent being Democratic incumbent President Bill Clinton in the 1996 presidential election. Dole conceded defeat in the race in a telephone call to Clinton on November 5, 1996.

Had he won, Dole would have been the first Kansas native to serve as president since Dwight D. Eisenhower and the oldest elected president to do so. The feat would have not been accomplished twenty-four years later to Joe Biden. Kemp would have been the twelfth vice president from New York.

== Background ==
Dole had been the Republican Party's vice presidential nominee in 1976. Dole had previously run unsuccessfully for the Republican presidential nomination in both the 1980 and 1988 Republican presidential primaries. Dole was the first losing vice presidential nominee to be nominated since Franklin D. Roosevelt.

The Republicans took control of both the Senate and House of Representatives in the 1994 mid-term elections, due to the fallout from President Bill Clinton's policies including his health care plan, and Dole became Senate Majority Leader for the second time. In October 1995, a year before the presidential election, Dole and Speaker of the House Newt Gingrich led the Republican-controlled Congress to pass a spending bill that President Clinton vetoed, leading to the federal government shutdown of 1995–96. On November 13, Republican and Democratic leaders, including Vice President Al Gore, Dick Armey, and Dole, met to try to resolve the budget and were unable to reach an agreement. By January 1996, Dole was more open to compromise to end the shutdown (as he was campaigning for the Republican presidential nomination), but was opposed by other Republicans who wanted to continue until their demands were met. In particular, Gingrich and Dole had a tense working relationship as they were potential rivals for the 1996 Republican nomination. Clinton aide George Stephanopoulos cited the shutdown as having a role in Clinton's successful re-election campaign.

Despite the 1994 elections, President Clinton's popularity soared due to a booming economy and public opinion polls supporting him in the 1995 budget shutdown. As a result, Clinton and vice president Al Gore faced no serious opposition in the Democratic primaries. A few months before his death in April 1994, Richard Nixon warned Dole "If the economy's good, you're not going to beat Clinton."

== Primary campaign ==
During an appearance on Late Show with David Letterman on February 3, 1995, Dole said that he planned to run for president in 1996 and that he would make a formal announcement in early April. He officially announced his candidacy on April 10.

Dole was the early front runner for the GOP nomination in the 1996 presidential race. At least eight candidates ran for the nomination. Dole was expected to win the nomination against underdog candidates such as the more conservative Senator Phil Gramm of Texas and more moderate Senator Arlen Specter of Pennsylvania. The candidates met in Des Moines for a Presidential Candidates Forum. Dole won the Iowa Caucus with 26% of the vote, a considerably smaller margin of victory than was expected. In the New Hampshire Primary, Buchanan recorded a surprising victory over Dole, who finished in second place. Speechwriter Kerry Tymchuk observed, "Dole was on the ropes because he wasn't conservative enough".

Steve Forbes surprisingly won primaries in Delaware and Arizona. Dole had not campaigned in Delaware, and faulty polling by Dole's campaign lured Dole into a false sense of security in Arizona, making Dole believe the state would be an easy victory for him and he would not have to spend much time campaigning in Arizona. After the votes were counted, Buchanan finished a devastating third place, Dole was the runner-up, and Forbes pulled off a shocking, come-from-behind victory. Exit polls showed that Forbes's support came from those who voted for third-party candidate Ross Perot back in 1992, as well as from the large number of voters who cited "taxes" as the most important issue of the race and those who viewed Buchanan as too "extreme" and Dole as too moderate and "mainstream".

Buchanan's and Forbes's early victories put Dole's expected front runner status in doubt during the formative months of the primary season. However, Dole won a sweep of the primaries held on March 19, 1996, securing him enough delegates to win the nomination, and making him his party's presumptive nominee. Buchanan suspended his campaign in March, but declared that, if Dole were to choose a pro-choice running mate, he would run as the US Taxpayers Party (now Constitution Party) candidate. Forbes also withdrew in March having won only two states.

=== Notable primary endorsements ===
- Former Senator and 1964 Presidential nominee Barry Goldwater of Arizona
- Governor George W. Bush of Texas
- Senator Bill Roth of Delaware
- Senator Alan Simpson of Wyoming
- Senator Al D'Amato of New York
- Former Governor Pete du Pont of Delaware
- Former Governor George Wallace of Alabama (Democrat)

== General election ==
=== Presumptive nominee ===
After becoming his party's presumptive nominee, Dole initially pledged that he would be a "full time senator" over the next several months, and that he would primarily only undertake campaign travel on weekends, saying that he would be visiting states that had not yet held their primaries.

On June 11, 1996, Dole resigned his U.S. Senate seat to focus on the campaign, saying he had "nowhere to go but the White House or home". As told in the Doles' joint biography, Unlimited Partners, speechwriter and biographer Kerry Tymchuk wrote "that he was going to make a statement. He was going to risk it all for the White House. He knew his time as leader was over. It would have been tough to come back [to the Senate as leader] if he lost in November. He knew it was time to move up or move out."

Dole promised a 15% across-the-board reduction in income tax rates and made former Congressman and supply side advocate Jack Kemp his running mate for vice president. Dole found himself criticized from both the left and the right within the Republican Party over the convention platform, one of the major issues being the inclusion of the Human Life Amendment. Clinton framed the narrative against Dole early, painting him as a mere clone of unpopular then-House Speaker Newt Gingrich, warning America that Dole would work in concert with the Republican Congress to slash popular social programs, like Medicare and Social Security, dubbed by Clinton as "Dole-Gingrich". Dole's tax-cut plan found itself under attack from the White House, who said it would "blow a hole in the deficit".

With the infancy of the Internet, Dole-Kemp was the first presidential campaign to set up a website, edging out Clinton-Gore, which was set up by Arizona State college students Rob Kubasko and Vince Salvato. The Dole-Kemp presidential campaign page is still live as of 2024.

While Dole's past remarks doubting the addictiveness of tobacco had already caused his campaign some trouble, Dole reiterated these doubts in late June. He stated that he believed that the federal government should not be regulating the sale of tobacco and that he thought tobacco may not be as addictive as others believed it to be. Dole's refusal to accept the scientific consensus on the addictiveness of tobacco provided another subject for the Clinton campaign to attack Dole on.

=== Convention ===
At the 1996 Republican National Convention in August, Dole formally became his party's nominee. At the time, he was the oldest first-time presidential nominee at the age of 73 years, 1 month on the day he was formally nominated (President Ronald Reagan was 73 years, 6 months in 1984, for his second presidential nomination). This record was later surpassed by Joe Biden aged 77 years, 8 months in 2020. If elected, he would have been the oldest president to take office and be the first Kansas native to become president (as Dwight Eisenhower was born in Texas). Dole found the initial draft of the acceptance speech written by Mark Helprin too hardline, so Kerry Tymchuk who was part of the "'Let Dole be Dole' crowd" revised the speech to cover the 'themes of honor, decency and straight talk. It included the following line, a swat at the all-or-nothing rookie Republicans who had been swept into Congress in the 1994 midterm GOP wave: "In politics honorable compromise is no sin. It is what protects us from absolutism and intolerance"'. He also became the first sitting Senate Party Leader to receive his party's nomination for president. He hoped to use his long experience in Senate procedures to maximize publicity from his rare positioning as Senate Majority Leader against an incumbent president but was stymied by Senate Democrats.

In his convention acceptance speech, Dole stated, "Let me be the bridge to an America that only the unknowing call myth. Let me be the bridge to a time of tranquility, faith, and confidence in action," to which incumbent president Bill Clinton responded, "We do not need to build a bridge to the past, we need to build a bridge to the future."

=== Post-convention ===
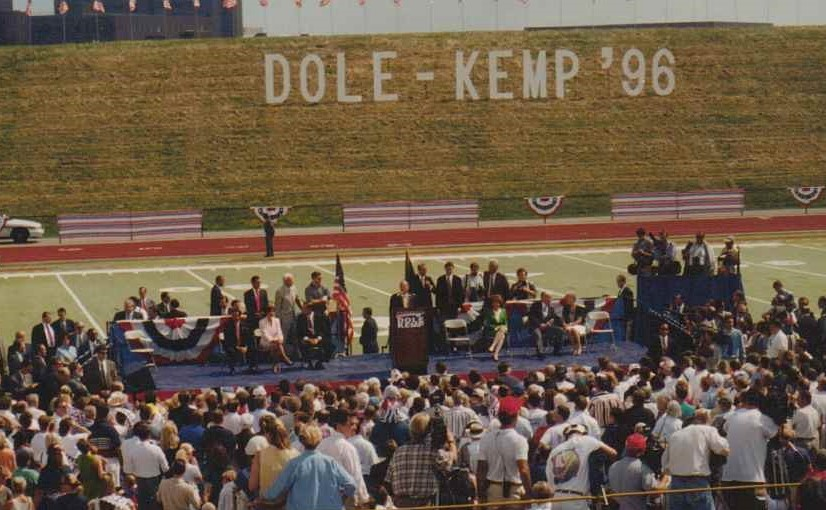
Dole–Kemp campaign rally at the State University of New York at Buffalo

Concerns over Dole's age and lagging campaign were exemplified by a memorable incident on September 18, 1996. At a rally in Chico, California, he was reaching down to shake the hand of a supporter, when the railing on the stage gave way and he tumbled four feet. While only minorly injured in the fall, "the televised image of his painful grimace underscored the age difference between him and Clinton" and proved an ominous sign for Republican hopes of retaking the White House.

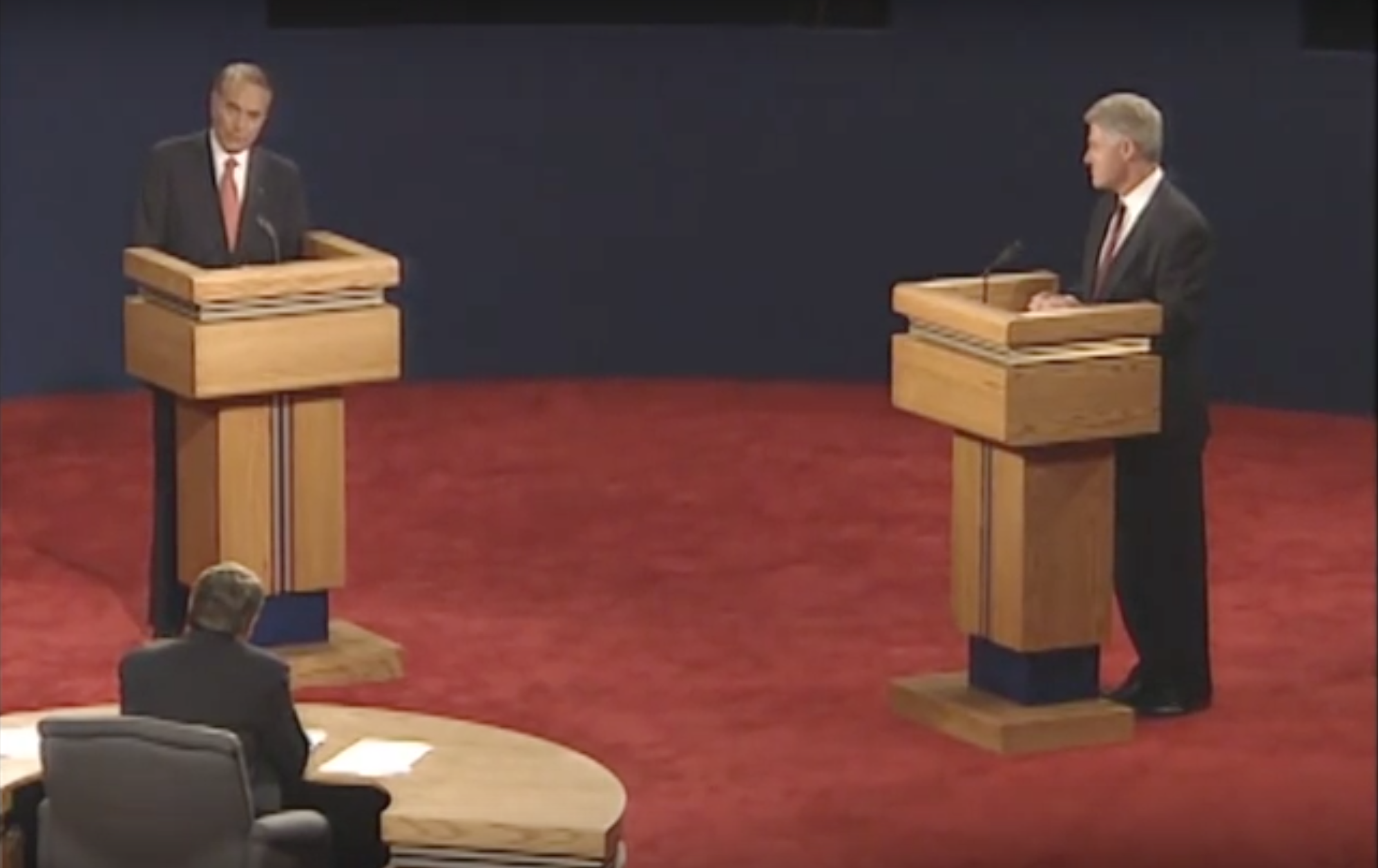
Dole (left) and Clinton (right) at the first presidential debate, held October 6 at The Bushnell Center for the Performing Arts in Hartford, Connecticut

During the latter half of October 1996, Dole made a campaign appearance with Heather Whitestone, the first deaf Miss America, where both of them signed "I love you" to the crowd. Around that time, Dole and his advisers knew that they would lose the election, but in the last four days of the campaign they went on the "96-hour victory tour" to help Republican Congressional candidates.

Dole is the last World War II veteran to have been the presidential nominee of a major party. During the campaign, Dole's advanced age was brought up, with critics stating that he was too old to be president.

In the final stretch of the campaign, Dole made a possible upset victory over Clinton in California a central part of his strategy. Dole aimed to capitalize on two issues that had been figuring prominently in California politics under Governor Pete Wilson, illegal immigration and affirmative action. This would fail, as Clinton would win the state by a double-digit margin.

=== Transition planning ===
A presidential transition was contingently planned from Clinton to Dole. In June 1996, William Timmons, who had experience working on the presidential transitions of Richard Nixon and Ronald Reagan, was placed in charge of plotting a prospective transition.

It was decided that a presidential transition for Bob Dole would have been headquartered in Washington, D.C., where Dole had primarily resided for 35 years. By mid-October, Timmons had secured 100,000 square feet of office space in the city's downtown for the potential transition, and had also arranged to furnish the office with desks, computers, and telephones for 374 staffers if Dole were elected. Timmons was very detailed with some aspects of planning, including plotting an hour-by-hour schedule for Dole to follow throughout his transition if elected. If Dole (or any other candidate) had defeated Clinton, Congress would have provided $3.9 million in federal funding for their post-election transition.

=== Loss and concession ===
Dole lost, as pundits had long expected, to incumbent President Bill Clinton in the 1996 election. Clinton won in a 379–159 Electoral College landslide, capturing 49.2% of the vote against Dole's 40.7% and Ross Perot's 8.4%. As Richard Nixon had predicted to Dole a few months before his death in April 1994, Clinton was able to ride a booming economy to a second term in the White House.

In his election night concession speech, Dole remarked "I was thinking on the way down in the elevator – tomorrow will be the first time in my life I don't have anything to do." Dole later wrote "I was wrong. Seventy-two hours after conceding the election, I was swapping wisecracks with David Letterman on his late-night show". During the immediate aftermath of his 1996 loss to Clinton, Dole recalled that his critics thought that "I didn't loosen up enough, I didn't show enough leg. They said I was too serious . . . It takes several months to stop fretting about it and move on. But I did." Dole remarked that his decisive defeat to Clinton made it easier for him to be "magnanimous". On his decision to leave politics for good after the 1996 presidential election campaign, despite his guaranteed stature as a former Senate leader, Dole stated "People were urging [me] to be a hatchet man against Clinton for the next four years. I couldn't see the point. Maybe after all those partisan fights, you look for more friendships. One of the nice things I've discovered is that when you're out of politics, you have more credibility with the other side . . . And you're out among all kinds of people, and that just doesn't happen often for an ex-president; he doesn't have the same freedom. So it hasn't been all bad."

== See also ==
- 1996 Republican Party presidential primaries
- 1996 Republican Party vice presidential candidate selection
- 1996 Republican National Convention
- 1996 United States presidential election
- Bill Clinton 1996 presidential campaign
- Ross Perot 1996 presidential campaign
