= Bill Clinton 1996 presidential campaign =

Bill Clinton for President 1996
- Clinton–Gore campaign logo.
- Campaign: 1996 Democratic primaries 1996 U.S. presidential election
- Candidate: Bill Clinton; 42nd President of the United States (1993–2001); Al Gore; 45th Vice President of the United States (1993–2001)
- Affiliation: Democratic Party
- Status: Announced: April 14, 1995; Presumptive nominee: March 26, 1996; Official nominee: August 29, 1996; Won election: November 5, 1996; Certification: January 9, 1997; Inaugurated: January 20, 1997
- Headquarters: Little Rock, Arkansas
- Key people: Peter Knight (campaign manager); Joe Lockhart (campaign spokesman); Ann Lewis (communications director & deputy campaign manager); Fred DuVal (deputy campaign manager); Terry McAuliffe (campaign co-chair); Laura Hartigan (finance director); Mark Penn (pollster); Dick Morris (campaign manager; left two months before the election)
- Slogan: Building a bridge to the twenty-first century

Website
- https://www.livingroomcandidate.org/websites/cg96/

The 1996 presidential campaign of Bill Clinton, the 42nd president of the United States, announced his candidacy for re-election as president on April 14, 1995. On August 29, 1996, he again became the nominee of the Democratic Party for the 1996 presidential election. Along with his running mate, Vice President Al Gore, President Bill Clinton was opposed in the general election by former U.S. Senator Bob Dole of Kansas, Ross Perot from Texas, and minor candidates from other parties. The election took place on Tuesday, November 5, 1996.

This was the first time since 1944, when President Franklin D. Roosevelt won re-election, that a Democratic incumbent president had won two consecutive presidential elections.

== Convention ==
The 1996 Democratic National Convention held in Chicago sparked protests, such as the one whereby Civil Rights Movement historian Randy Kryn and 10 others were arrested by the Federal Protective Service, and Clinton won the party's nomination.

== Election and victory ==
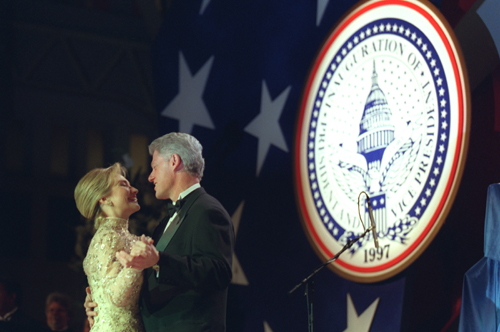
President Bill Clinton dances with First Lady Hillary Clinton during the celebrations of winning re-election. This event was in Washington, D.C., and the theme centered around the Commander-In-Chief.

The election took place on November 5, 1996, and ended with Clinton gaining 379 electoral votes and Dole garnering 159 electoral votes. With 379 electoral votes, President Bill Clinton won the 1996 presidential election. Clinton received over 47 million popular votes, Dole received over 39 million votes, and Perot received over 8 million votes.

== See also ==
- 1996 Democratic Party presidential primaries
- 1996 Democratic National Convention
- 1996 United States presidential election
- Bob Dole 1996 presidential campaign
- Ross Perot 1996 presidential campaign
- Bill Clinton 1992 presidential campaign
